= Cayenne =

Capital city of French Guiana

Cayenne Kayenn (Guianese Creole French) Kayana (Sranan Tongo) Kayen(i) (Eastern Maroon Creole)
- Capital city, prefecture and commune
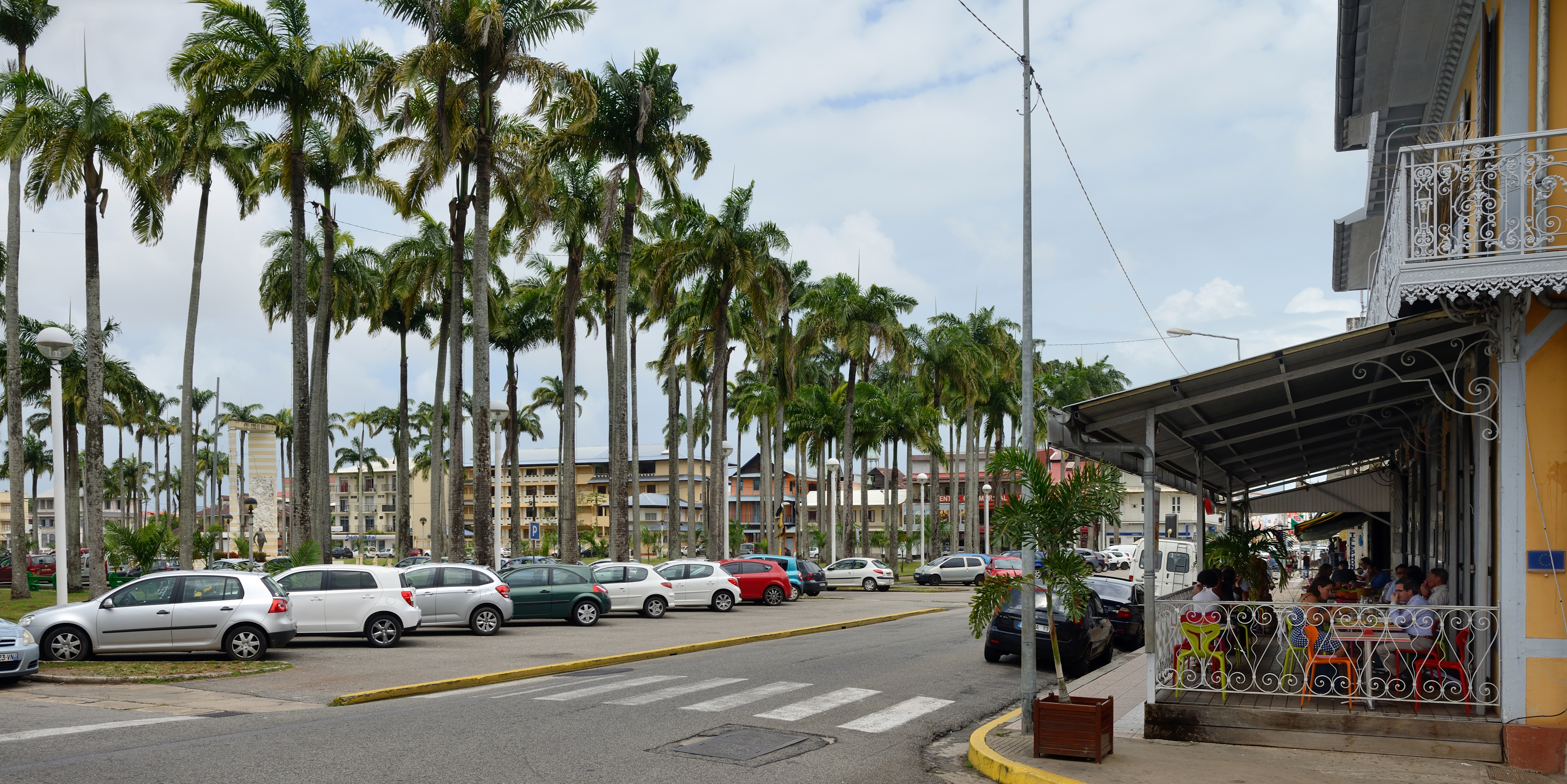
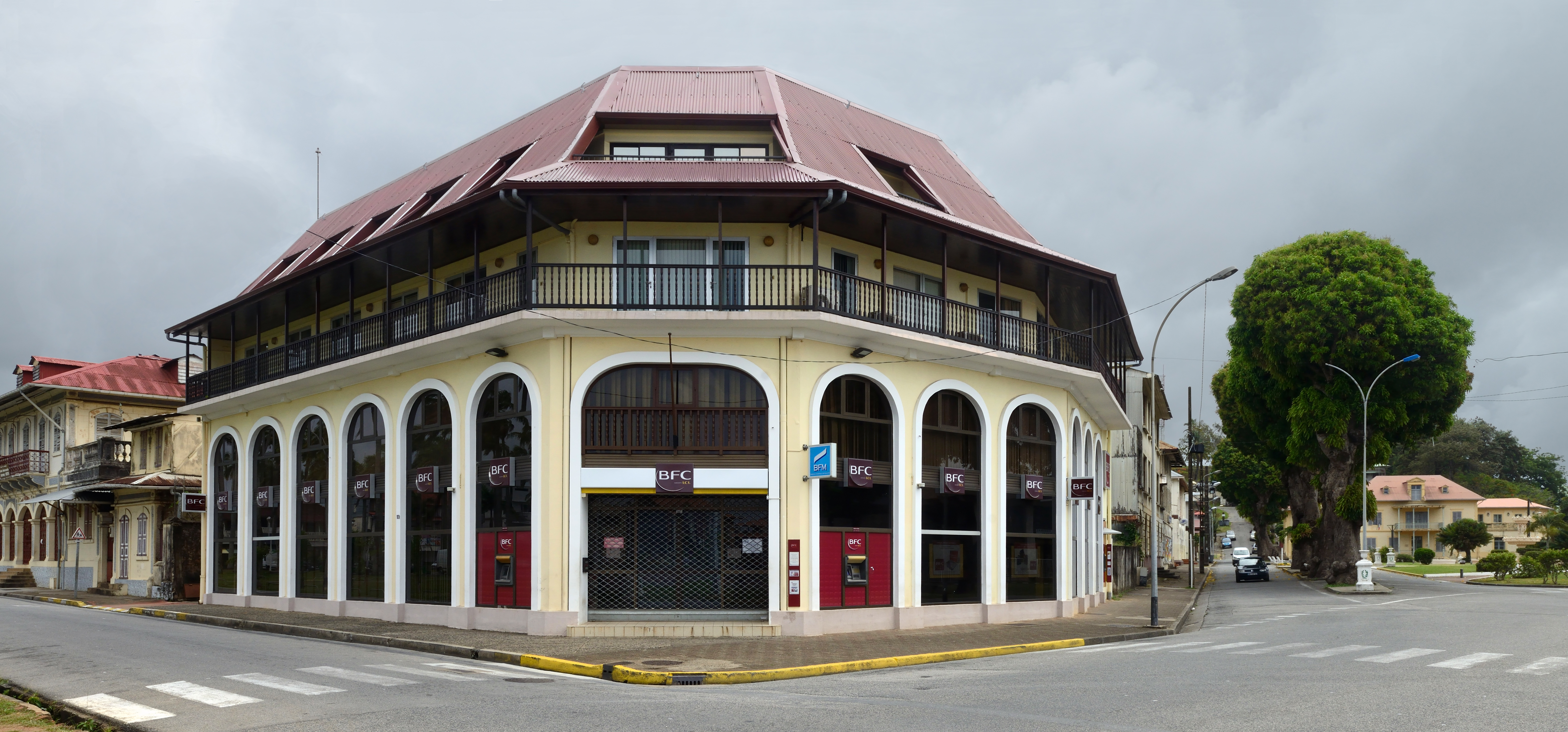
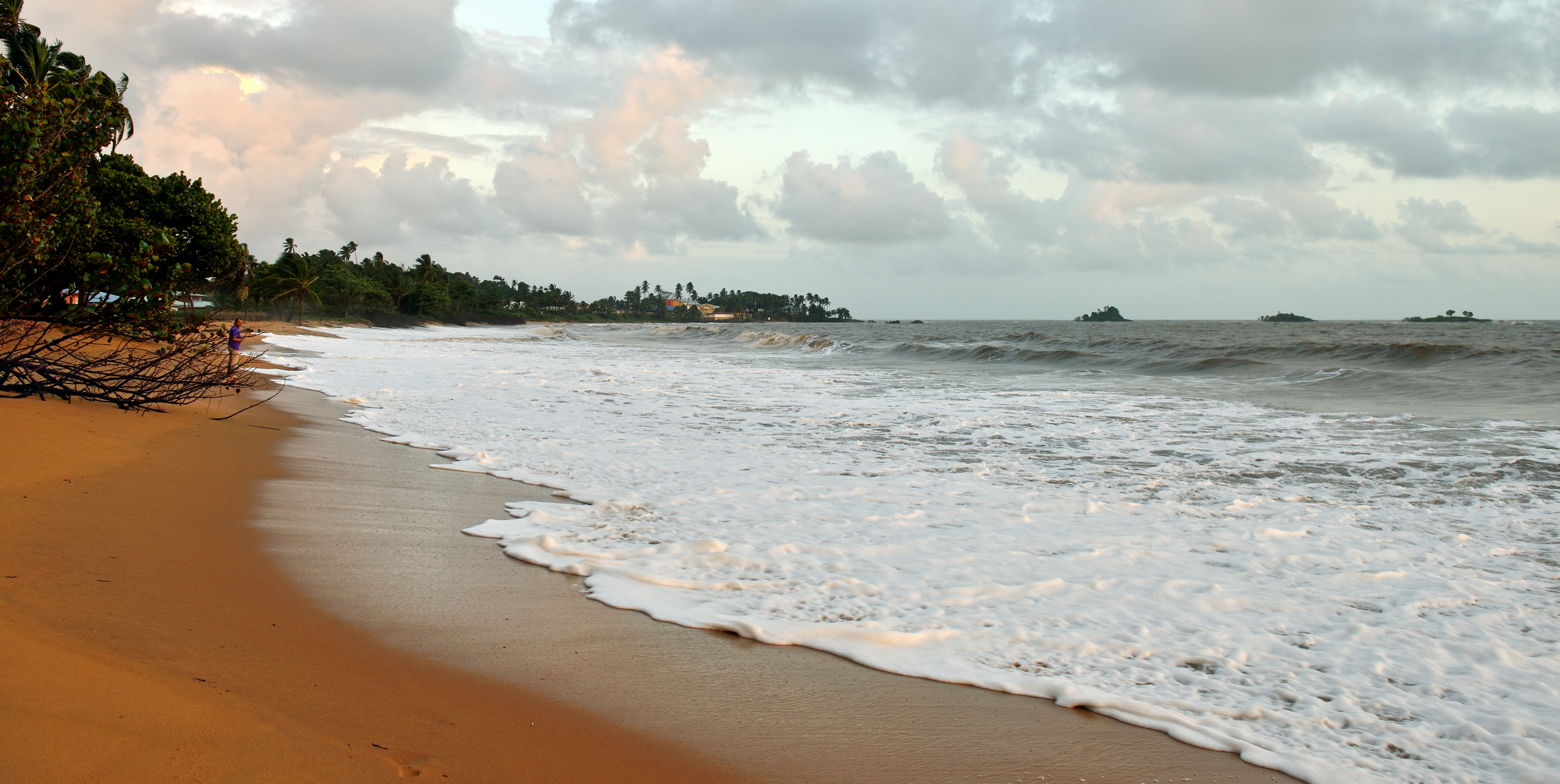
- From top to bottom: Place des Palmistes, LCL Bank and beaches of Cayenne at Anse Montabo.

- Flag Coat of arms

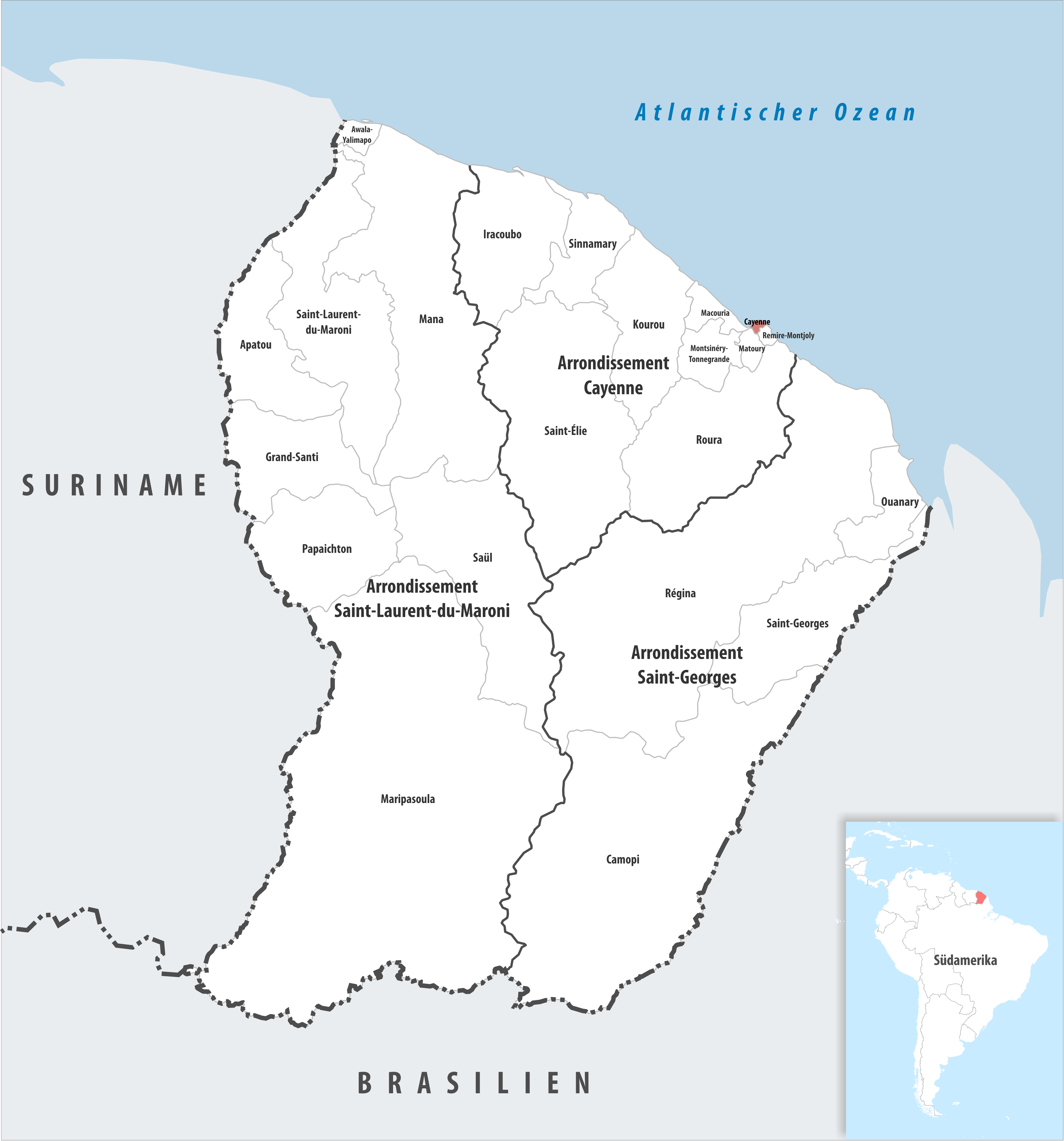
- Location of the commune (in red) within French Guiana
- Location of Cayenne
- Coordinates: 4°56′14″N 52°19′34″W
- Country: France
- Overseas region and department: French Guiana
- Arrondissement: Cayenne
- Intercommunality: CA Centre Littoral

Government
  - Mayor (2020–2026): Sandra Trochimara
- Area^{1}: 23.60 km^{2} (9.11 sq mi)
  - Urban (2020): 206.9 km^{2} (79.9 sq mi)
  - Metro (2020): 5,087 km^{2} (1,964 sq mi)
- Population (2023): 62,675
  - Rank: 1st in French Guiana
  - Density: 2,656/km^{2} (6,878/sq mi)
  - Urban: 126,910
  - Urban density: 613.4/km^{2} (1,589/sq mi)
  - Metro: 153,884
  - Metro density: 30.25/km^{2} (78.35/sq mi)
- Demonym: Cayennais
- Time zone: UTC−03:00
- INSEE/Postal code: 97302 /97300
- ^{1} French Land Register data, which excludes lakes, ponds, glaciers > 1 km^{2} (0.386 sq mi or 247 acres) and river estuaries.

Cayenne (/keɪˈɛn/; French pronunciation: [kajɛn]; Guianese Creole French: Kayenn; Sranan Tongo: Kayana, [kajana]; Eastern Maroon Creole: Kayen or Kayeni) is the capital, prefecture, and largest city of French Guiana, an overseas region and department of France located in South America. The city stands on a former island at the mouth of the Cayenne River on the Atlantic coast. The city's motto is "fert aurum industria", which means "work brings wealth". Cayenne is the largest Francophone city of the South American continent.

In the 2023 census, there were 153,884 inhabitants in the metropolitan area of Cayenne (as defined by INSEE), 62,675 of whom lived in the city (commune) of Cayenne proper.

== History ==
Historical affiliations

(Kingdom of France) French colonial empire 1643–1658
Dutch Empire 1658–1664
(Kingdom of France) French colonial empire 1664–1676
(Kingdom of England) English Empire 1667
Dutch Empire 1676
(Kingdom of France) French colonial empire 1676–1809
Portuguese Empire 1809–1815
United Kingdom of Portugal, Brazil and the Algarves 1815–1817
France 1817–present

The Spanish explorers who first visited the area found the region too hot and therefore chose not to settle it. The region was not colonized until 1604, when the French founded their first settlement. However, it was soon destroyed by the Portuguese, determined to enforce the Treaty of Tordesillas. French colonists returned in 1643 and founded Cayenne, but were forced to leave once more following the attacks by the local Indigenous Amerindian population. In 1664, France finally established a permanent settlement at Cayenne. Over the next decade the colony changed hands between the French, Dutch, and English, before being restored to France. Cayenne was made a municipality in 1790. It was captured by an Anglo-Portuguese force in 1809 and administered from Brazil until 1817, when it was returned to French control. It was used as a French penal colony from 1854 to 1938.

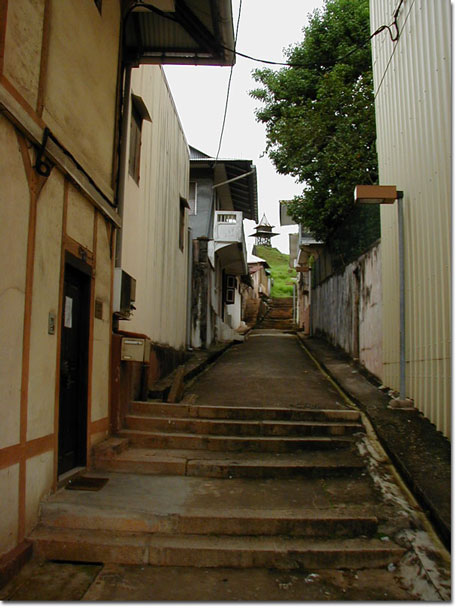
Pedestrian street not far from Fort Cépérou.

The city's population has grown dramatically over time, owing to high levels of immigration (chiefly from the West Indies and Brazil) as well as a high birth rate.

== Geography ==
Cayenne is located on the estuary of the Cayenne River on the Atlantic Ocean. The city occupies part of Cayenne Island. It is 268 kilometres (167 mi) from Saint-Laurent-du-Maroni and 64 kilometres (40 mi) from Kourou.

Distances to some cities:

- Paris: 7,100 kilometres (4,400 mi).
- Fort-de-France, capital of Martinique: 1,500 kilometres (930 mi).
- Nouméa, capital of New Caledonia (France) : 15,427 kilometres (9,586 mi)
- Paramaribo, capital of Suriname: 342 kilometres (213 mi) to the northwest
- Macapá, capital of the state of Amapá, Brazil: 554 kilometres (344 mi) to the southeast
- Mexico City, capital of Mexico: 5,534 kilometres (3,439 mi) to the northwest
- San Diego, southwestern city in California, United States: 7,363 kilometres (4,575 mi) to the northwest

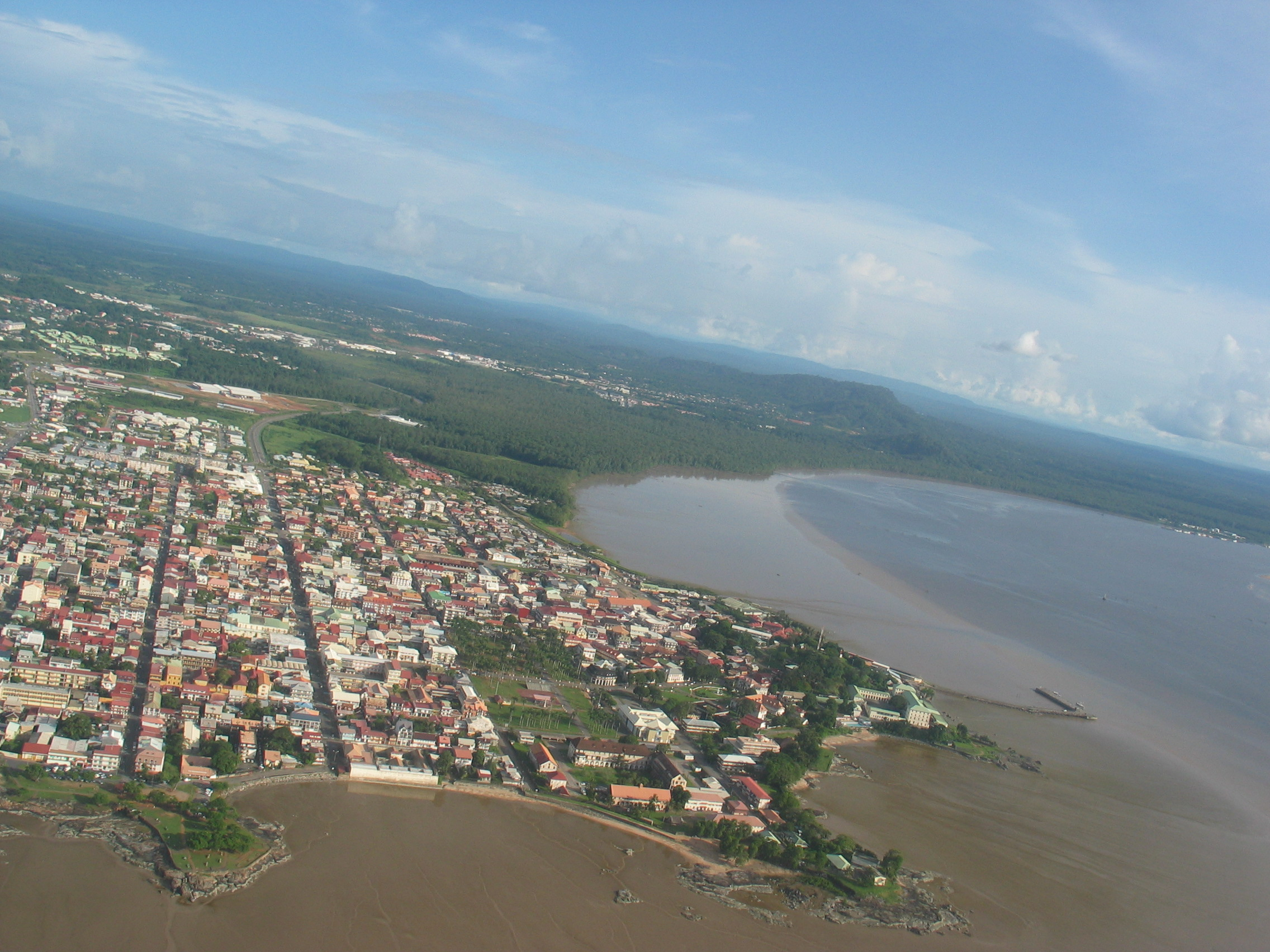
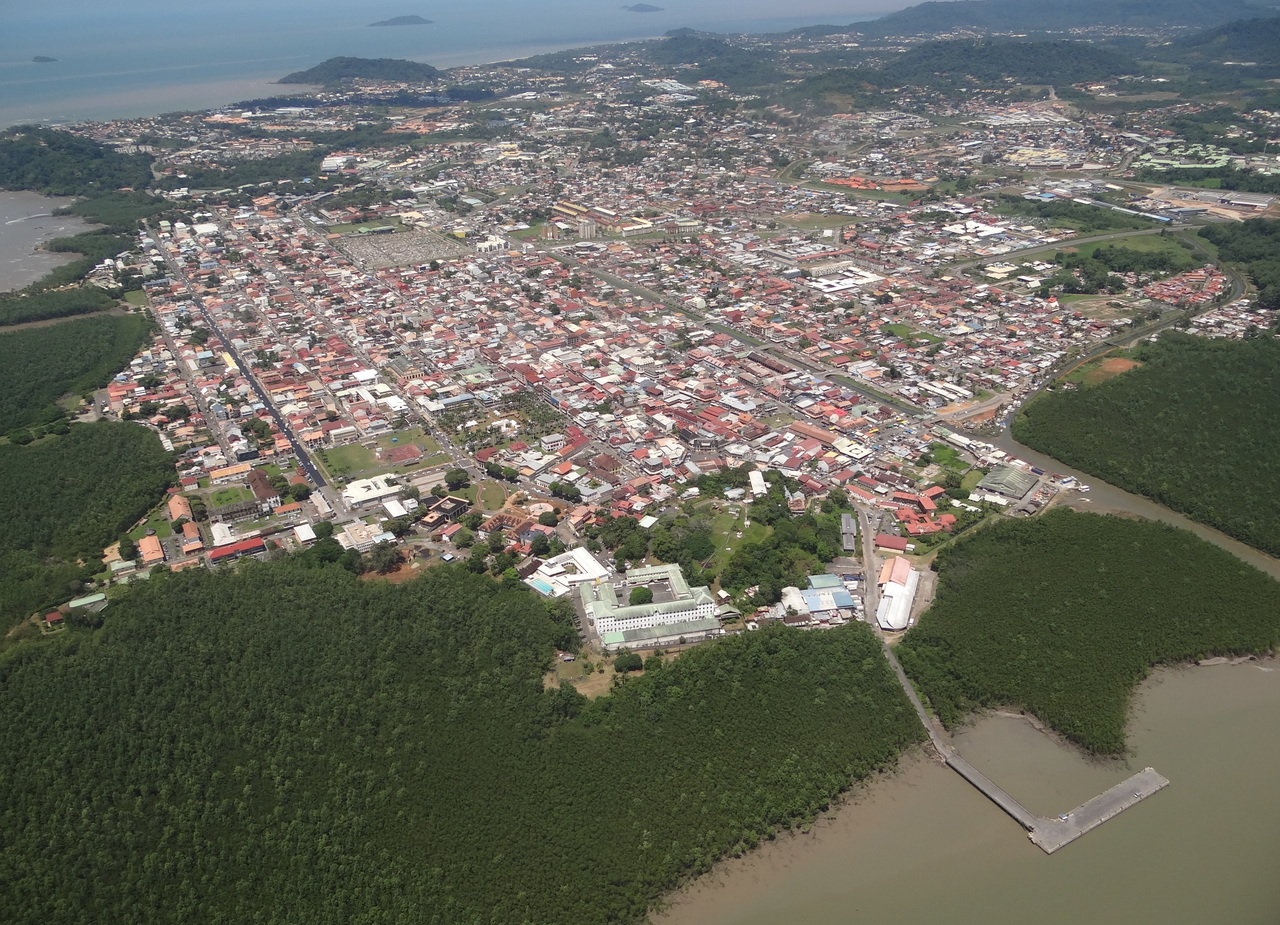
2003 (left) and 2012 (right) aerial views of Cayenne. Note: the mangrove, which had invaded the coastline of Cayenne in the late 2000s, has completely disappeared as of the late 2010s.

== Administration ==
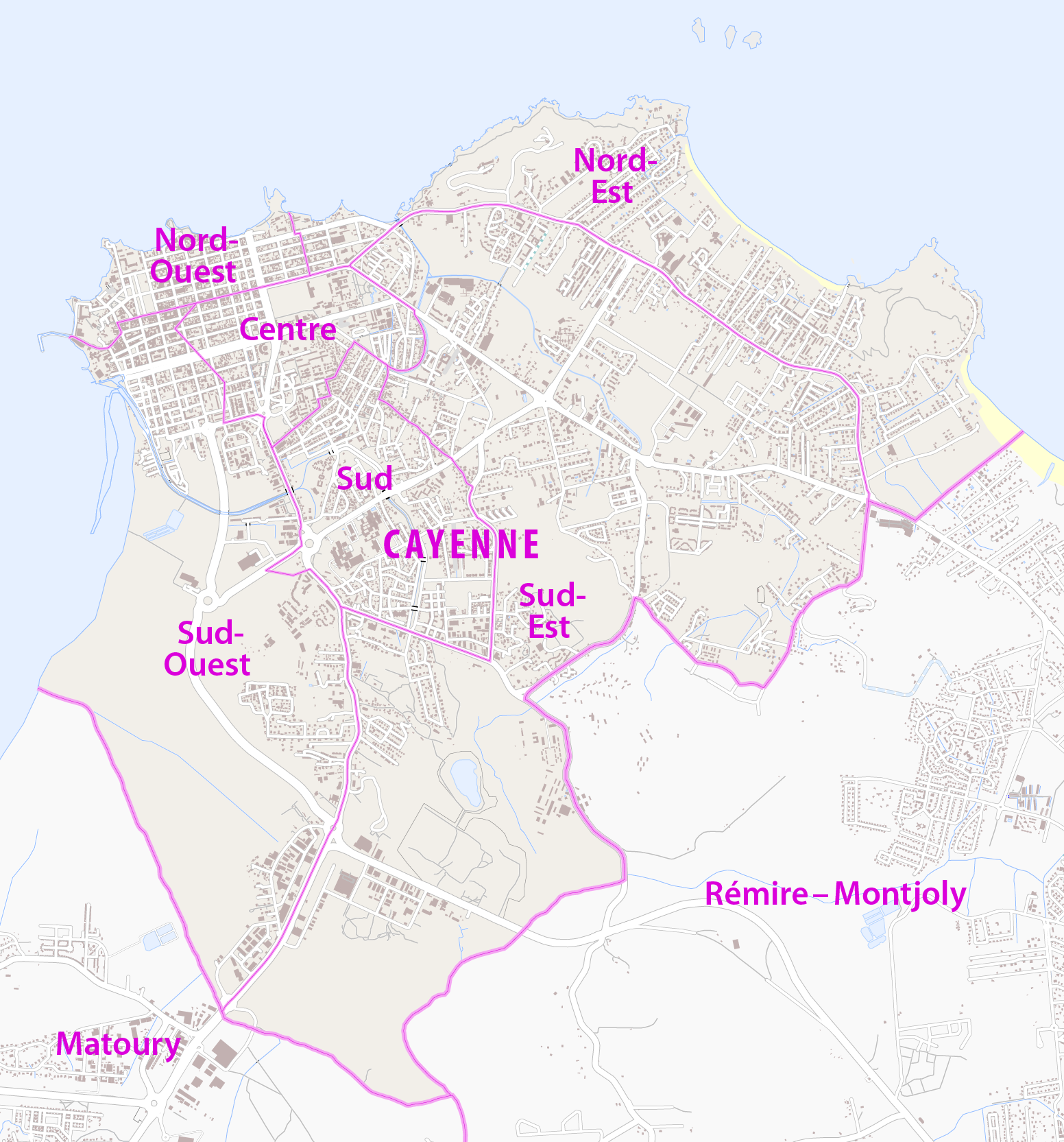
The commune of Cayenne with its former cantons in the early 2010s. (note: the cantons were abolished in 2015)

Cayenne is a commune of France and as such, administered by a mayor and a municipal council. The current mayor is Sandra Trochimara, who was 1st deputy mayor under the former mayor Marie-Laure Phinéra-Horth, and succeeded her as mayor of Cayenne in October 2020 after Phinéra-Horth won the local Senate race the month before (under French law, members of the French Senate cannot exercise the mandate of mayor). Marie-Laure Phinéra-Horth, a former member of the Guianese Socialist Party, daughter of a former president of the General Council of French Guiana, Stéphan Phinéra-Horth, from the Guianese Socialist Party, who governed the department of French Guiana from 1994 to 1998, was supported by various left-wing parties and had been mayor of Cayenne since 2010.

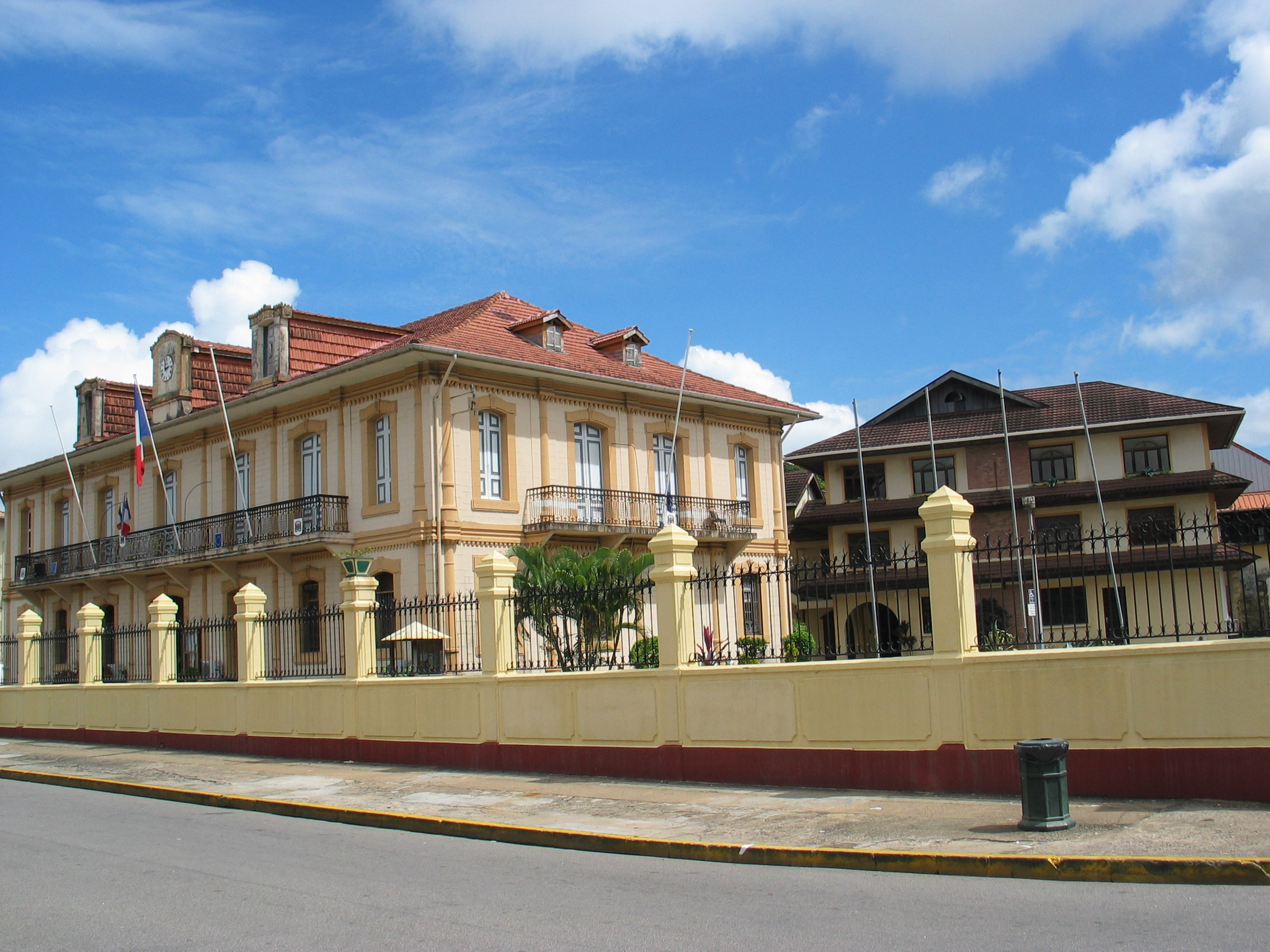
Town hall

As in the rest of France, the small size of the commune of Cayenne does not cover the entire urban area of Cayenne. This has led to the creation of an intercommunal authority which groups Cayenne and five suburban communes: the communauté d'agglomération du Centre Littoral. The current president of the intercommunal authority of Centre Littoral since November 2020 has been Serge Smock, mayor of Matoury, who ran on a centrist platform affiliated with Emmanuel Macron's LREM party and defeated Sandra Trochimara, successor of Marie-Laure Phinéra-Horth as mayor of Cayenne, who was also trying to succeed her as president of the intercommunal authority with the support of an array of Left-wing parties. It is the first time since 2001 that the intercommunal authority is not presided by the mayor of Cayenne. Marie-Laure Phinéra-Horthwas was president of the intercommunal authority of Centre Littoral from 2014 to 2020, and did not run for reelection due to her election to the French Senate in September 2020.

The intercommunal authority of Centre Littoral, which levies its own taxes, is in charge of refuse collection, water supply and sewage treatment, urban planning, and public transport for the 5,087 km^{2} (1,964 sq mi) of Cayenne and its suburbs.

Until 2015, the commune of Cayenne was divided into six cantons, but these were abolished in 2015 when the department and the region of French Guiana were abolished and replaced by the French Guiana Territorial Collectivity.

== Population ==
Historical population Cayenne (commune)
Year	Pop.	±% p.a.
1954	13,362	—
1961	18,615	+4.66%
1967	24,518	+4.68%
1974	30,461	+3.15%
1982	38,091	+3.07%
1990	41,067	+0.94%
1999	50,594	+2.35%
2007	58,008	+1.76%
2012	55,198	−0.99%
2017	61,268	+2.11%
2023	62,675	+0.38%
Source: INSEE and Brasseur

Historical population Cayenne (metropolitan area)
Year	Pop.	±% p.a.
1954	15,606	—
1961	21,505	+4.51%
1967	28,257	+4.64%
1974	35,812	+3.44%
1982	49,118	+4.37%
1990	66,803	+3.91%
1999	92,059	+3.64%
2007	114,384	+2.82%
2012	121,490	+1.21%
2017	138,920	+2.72%
2023	153,884	+1.72%
Source: INSEE and Brasseur

=== Demographics ===
The places of birth of the 121,490 residents in the Cayenne metropolitan area at the 2012 census were as follows:

- 56.5% were born in French Guiana
- 12.0% in Metropolitan France
- 3.0% in Martinique
- 1.4% in Guadeloupe
- 0.3% in other parts of Overseas France
- 26.7% in other foreign countries (notably Haiti and Brazil, followed by Suriname and Guyana); among these, 25.0% were immigrants and 1.7% were children of French citizens born abroad

These were the countries of birth of the immigrants living in the Cayenne metropolitan area at the 2009 census:

- born in Haiti: 12,184
- born in Brazil: 7,627
- born in Suriname: 2,691
- born in Guyana: 2,537
- born in China: 924
- born in other countries: 3,713

=== Health ===
Health conditions in Cayenne and French Guiana are generally good. The principal illnesses that cause mortality are circulatory, infectious and parasitic diseases, as well as cancer. A branch of the Pasteur Institute in Paris, located in Cayenne, conducts research on tropical and endemic local diseases and is renowned throughout Latin America. Life expectancy averaged about 76 years for men and 83 years for women in 2016. The main hospital of the city is the Andrée-Rosemon Hospital which opened in 1992.

== Economy ==
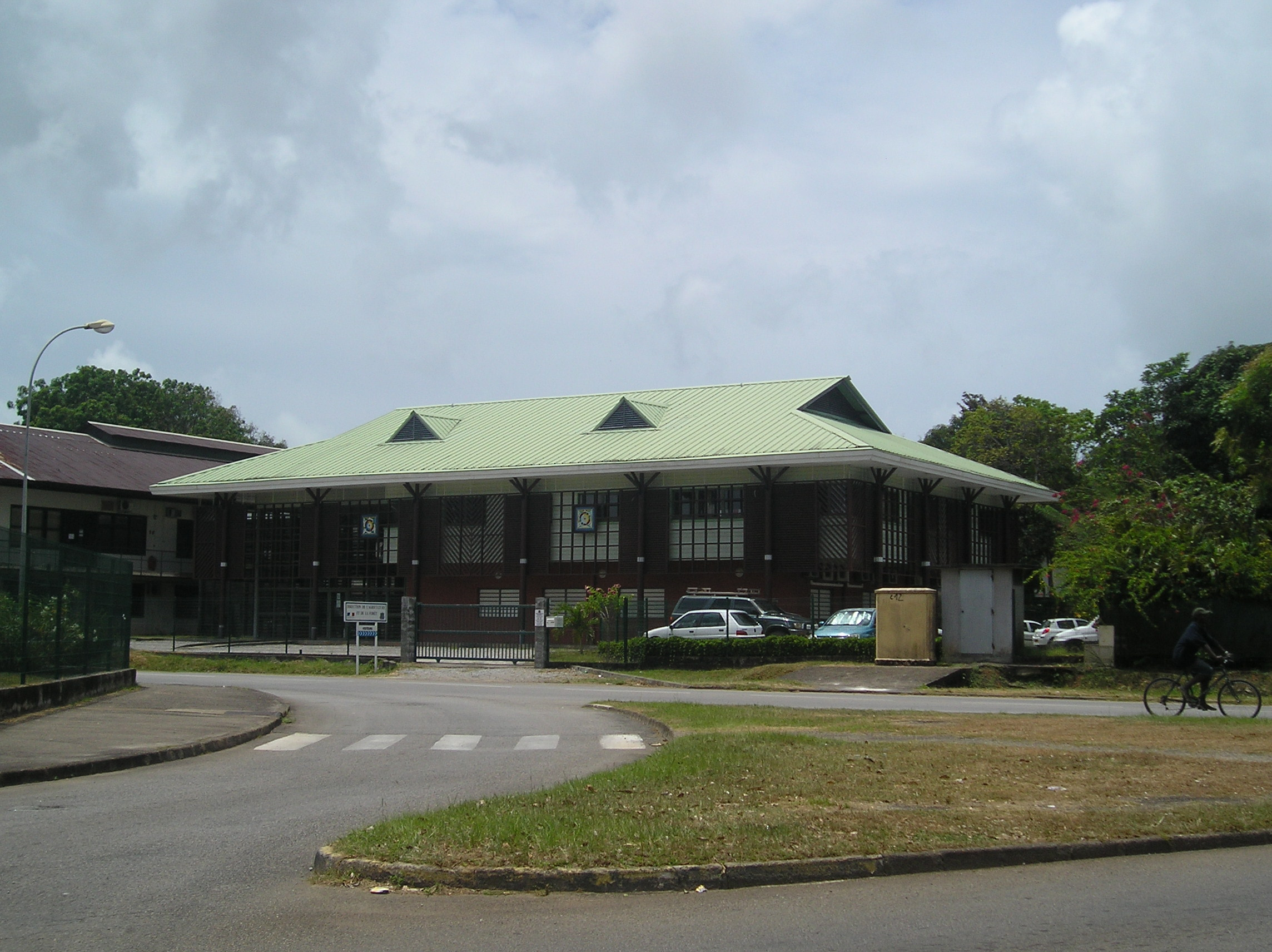
Direction départementale de l'Agriculture et de la Forêt (Office of Departmental Service for Forests and Agriculture)

Cayenne is an important seaport in South America. The major port of Dégrad des Cannes is on the estuary of the river Mahury, replacing Larivot and the Îles du Salut. Timber, rosewood essence, rum, and gold are exported in small quantities. In the mid-1960s sugarcane and pineapple were planted around the city, and a pineapple cannery and a shrimp-processing plant were later built. A seafront avenue links Cayenne with the suburbs of Chaton and Montabo, where the French Institute of Tropical America and the Pasteur Institute are located. Historic landmarks include the Church of the Holy Saviour and a prefecture on the Place d'Armes. The Félix Eboué International Airport is the only international airport serving Cayenne.

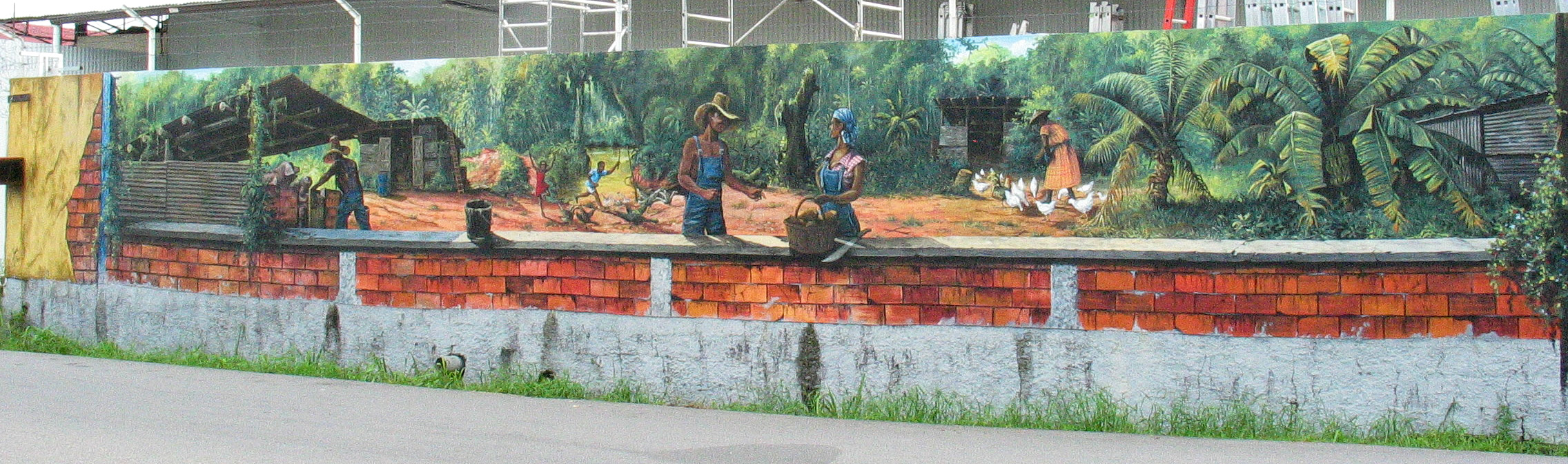
Trompe-l'œil mural at the Carrefour Suzini

== Climate ==
Under the Köppen climate classification, Cayenne has a tropical monsoon climate (Am) bordering on an equatorial climate (Af). Average high and low temperatures are nearly identical throughout the course of the year, averaging about 30 °C (86 °F) and 23 °C (73 °F) respectively, although temperatures are somewhat cooler in the wet season than in the dry season. Cayenne sees copious precipitation during the year, with its weather being more strongly affected by the Intertropical Convergence Zone (ITCZ) than the trade winds. The city experiences a very lengthy wet season and a very short dry season – the dry season covers only August to October, while the wet season covers the remainder of the year. Some precipitation is seen even during the dry season, a trait common in tropical climates. Cayenne averages roughly 3,500 millimetres (140 in) of rain each year.

Comparison of local Meteorological data with other cities in France
Town	Sunshine (hours/yr)	Rain (mm/yr)	Snow (days/yr)	Storm (days/yr)	Fog (days/yr)
National average	1,973	770	14	22	40
Cayenne	2,072	3,515.6	0	39.7	34.1
Paris	1,661	637	12	18	10
Nice	2,724	767	1	29	1
Strasbourg	1,693	665	29	29	56
Brest	1,605	1,211	7	12	75

Climate data for Cayenne (CAY, altitude 4m, 1991–2020 normals, extremes 1948–present)
Month	Jan	Feb	Mar	Apr	May	Jun	Jul	Aug	Sep	Oct	Nov	Dec	Year
Record high °C (°F)	32.5 (90.5)	32.3 (90.1)	33.1 (91.6)	33.0 (91.4)	33.8 (92.8)	34.4 (93.9)	34.5 (94.1)	35.0 (95.0)	35.2 (95.4)	36.2 (97.2)	34.6 (94.3)	34.1 (93.4)	36.2 (97.2)
Mean daily maximum °C (°F)	29.3 (84.7)	29.3 (84.7)	29.7 (85.5)	30.0 (86.0)	30.1 (86.2)	30.5 (86.9)	31.1 (88.0)	31.8 (89.2)	32.4 (90.3)	32.5 (90.5)	31.7 (89.1)	30.3 (86.5)	30.7 (87.3)
Daily mean °C (°F)	26.4 (79.5)	26.4 (79.5)	26.7 (80.1)	26.9 (80.4)	26.8 (80.2)	26.8 (80.2)	26.8 (80.2)	27.2 (81.0)	27.4 (81.3)	27.5 (81.5)	27.2 (81.0)	26.7 (80.1)	26.9 (80.4)
Mean daily minimum °C (°F)	23.4 (74.1)	23.5 (74.3)	23.6 (74.5)	23.8 (74.8)	23.6 (74.5)	23.0 (73.4)	22.5 (72.5)	22.5 (72.5)	22.5 (72.5)	22.4 (72.3)	22.7 (72.9)	23.2 (73.8)	23.1 (73.6)
Record low °C (°F)	17.4 (63.3)	18.9 (66.0)	18.5 (65.3)	19.0 (66.2)	18.8 (65.8)	18.9 (66.0)	19.0 (66.2)	19.0 (66.2)	18.7 (65.7)	18.6 (65.5)	17.2 (63.0)	18.8 (65.8)	17.2 (63.0)
Average precipitation mm (inches)	399.4 (15.72)	334.8 (13.18)	315.4 (12.42)	443.2 (17.45)	600.0 (23.62)	392.2 (15.44)	262.2 (10.32)	135.4 (5.33)	63.2 (2.49)	54.9 (2.16)	135.2 (5.32)	352.3 (13.87)	3,488.2 (137.33)
Average precipitation days (≥ 1.0 mm)	22.8	20.5	20.4	22.1	26.6	25.2	21.2	14.0	6.4	6.4	12.4	21.5	219.6
Mean monthly sunshine hours	102.4	90.2	117.3	121.1	121.4	153.2	200.1	231.3	250.8	256.6	208.1	150.3	2,002.8
Source: Meteo France

Climate data for Cayenne (Suzuni, altitude 4m, 1991−2020 normals, extremes 1972−present)
Month	Jan	Feb	Mar	Apr	May	Jun	Jul	Aug	Sep	Oct	Nov	Dec	Year
Record high °C (°F)	31.4 (88.5)	31.9 (89.4)	32.2 (90.0)	34.0 (93.2)	33.4 (92.1)	33.5 (92.3)	34.4 (93.9)	33.3 (91.9)	34.4 (93.9)	33.7 (92.7)	33.6 (92.5)	33.3 (91.9)	34.4 (93.9)
Mean daily maximum °C (°F)	28.7 (83.7)	28.7 (83.7)	29.0 (84.2)	29.3 (84.7)	29.2 (84.6)	29.4 (84.9)	30.0 (86.0)	30.4 (86.7)	30.7 (87.3)	30.9 (87.6)	30.4 (86.7)	29.5 (85.1)	29.7 (85.5)
Daily mean °C (°F)	26.5 (79.7)	26.5 (79.7)	26.8 (80.2)	27.1 (80.8)	26.8 (80.2)	26.5 (79.7)	26.6 (79.9)	27.0 (80.6)	27.4 (81.3)	27.7 (81.9)	27.5 (81.5)	27.0 (80.6)	27.0 (80.6)
Mean daily minimum °C (°F)	24.2 (75.6)	24.4 (75.9)	24.7 (76.5)	24.8 (76.6)	24.3 (75.7)	23.6 (74.5)	23.3 (73.9)	23.7 (74.7)	24.1 (75.4)	24.5 (76.1)	24.6 (76.3)	24.5 (76.1)	24.2 (75.6)
Record low °C (°F)	20.3 (68.5)	20.5 (68.9)	21.4 (70.5)	21.2 (70.2)	21.2 (70.2)	20.5 (68.9)	20.4 (68.7)	20.3 (68.5)	20.3 (68.5)	20.8 (69.4)	20.5 (68.9)	20.1 (68.2)	20.1 (68.2)
Average precipitation mm (inches)	370.9 (14.60)	248.8 (9.80)	259.8 (10.23)	355.3 (13.99)	517.9 (20.39)	373.6 (14.71)	155.2 (6.11)	79.1 (3.11)	39.3 (1.55)	51.5 (2.03)	104.8 (4.13)	259.6 (10.22)	2,815.8 (110.86)
Average precipitation days (≥ 1.0 mm)	20.5	16.2	16.6	19.0	24.3	23.4	15.5	8.8	5.0	6.3	10.8	18.9	185.1
Source: Météo-France

== Heritage ==
=== Saint-Sauveur Cathedral ===
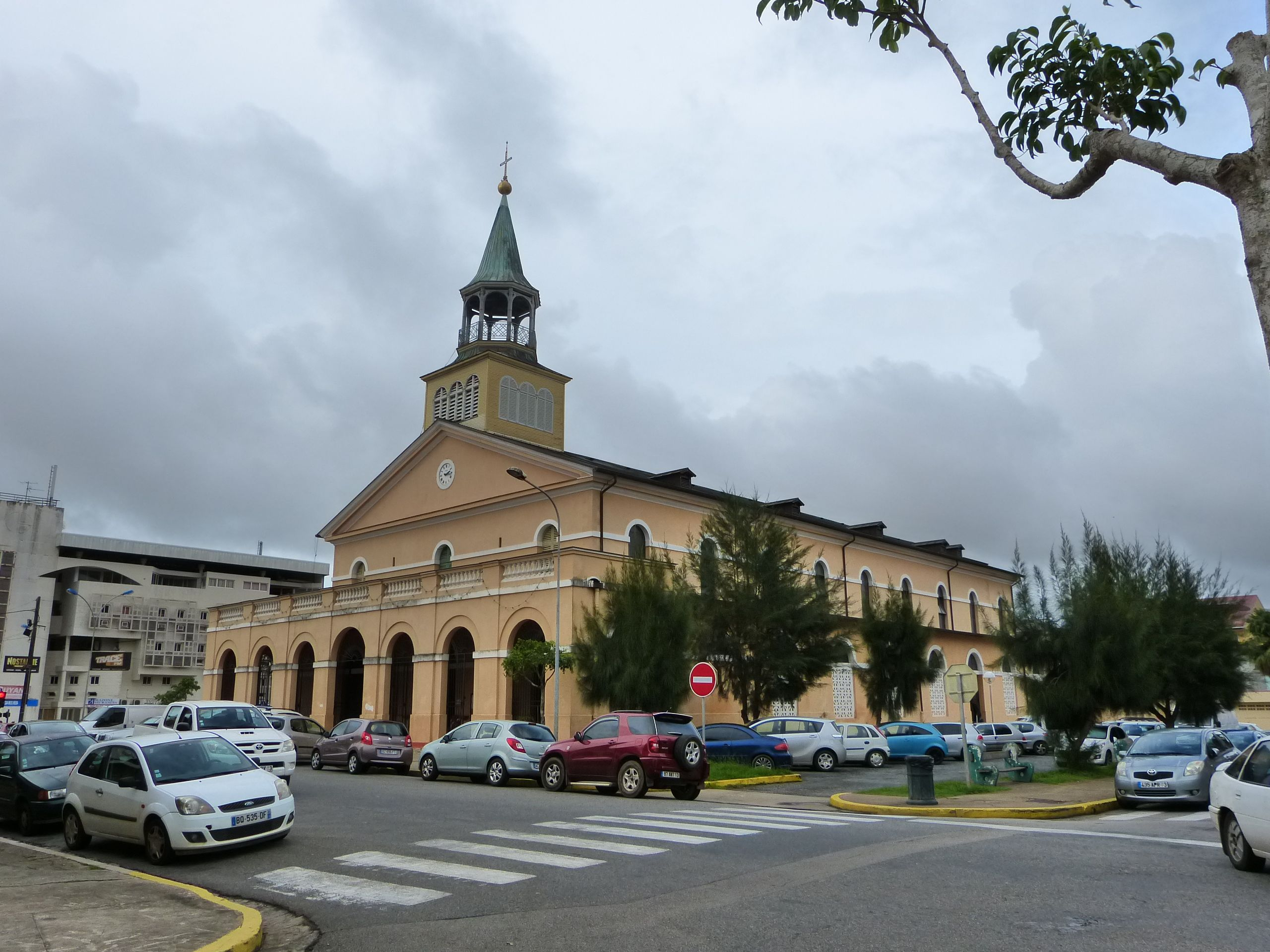
Cathédrale Saint-Sauveur de Cayenne after its renovation in 2005.

In 1823 Father Nicolas Guiller and Baron Pierre Bernard Milius, administrator of French Guiana, decided to replace the old church of Saint Nicolas on the current Place Léopold-Héder. Work began in 1825 and ended in 1833. The church was inaugurated in 1861 and is registered as a French monument historique.

The high altar, the pulpit, and the confessional of the penitentiary chapel on the Îlet la Mère were transferred to the cathedral in 1876.

In 1933, the church was declared a cathedral. It was consecrated in November 1934 by monseigneur Pierre Gourtay, the first bishop of Guyana. In 1952, construction workers discovered a lead case containing 21 coins, the oldest of which dated to the Napoleonic period, and 20 seals from the reign of Charles X.

Between 1952 and 1954, the ceiling, the windows, and the floors of the tribunal were replaced. The bell tower was renovated in 2000–01.

=== Fort Cépérou ===
Fort Cépérou, originally known as Fort Saint-Michel, is a 17th-century fortification on Mount Cépérou, named for the Amerindian chief who in 1643 sold the rock on which it stands to the Frenchman Charles Poncet de Brétigny, governor of Cayenne in 1644–1645.

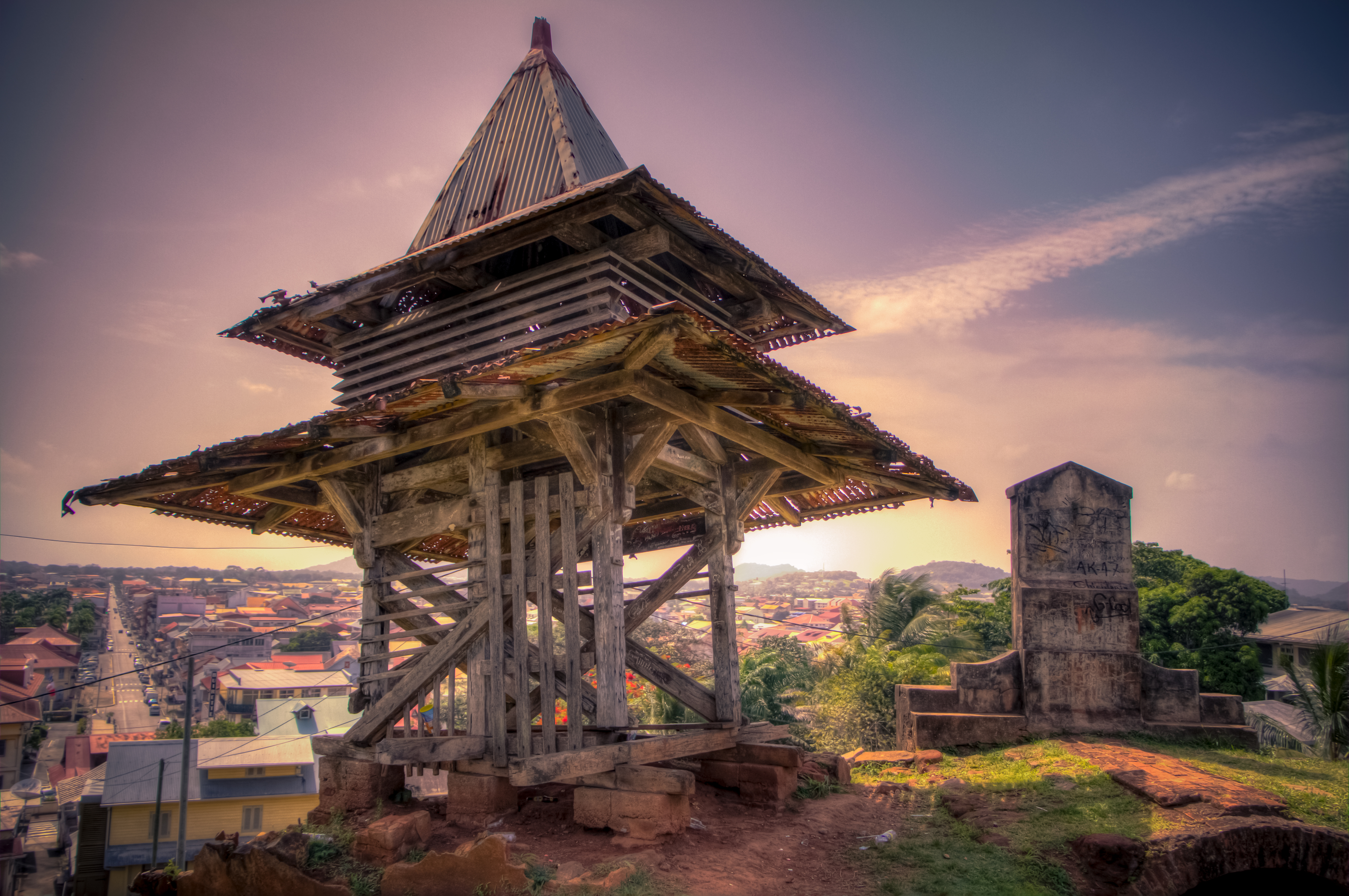
View of Cayenne from Fort Cépérou with belfry in foreground, May 2015.

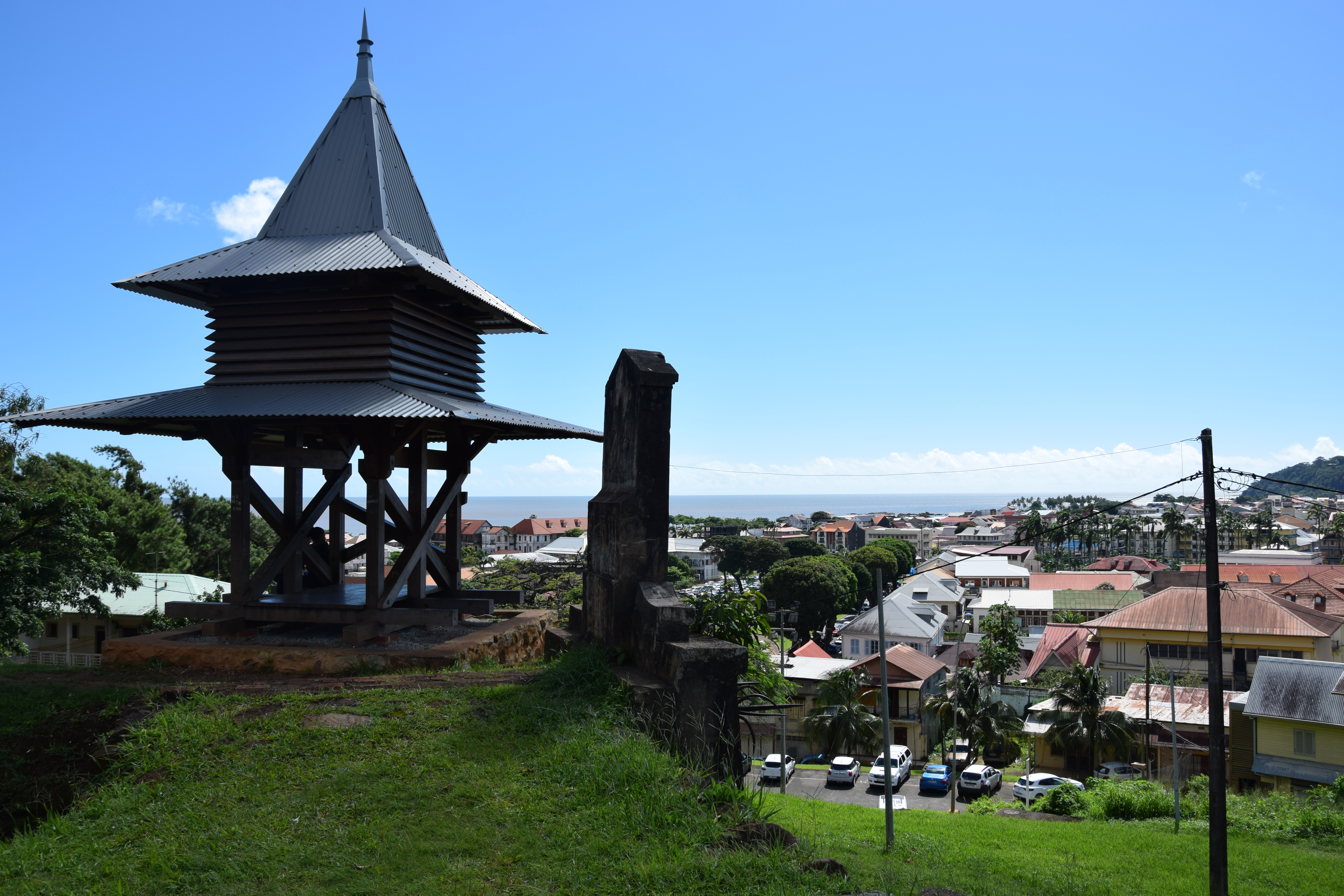
View of the renovated pagoda

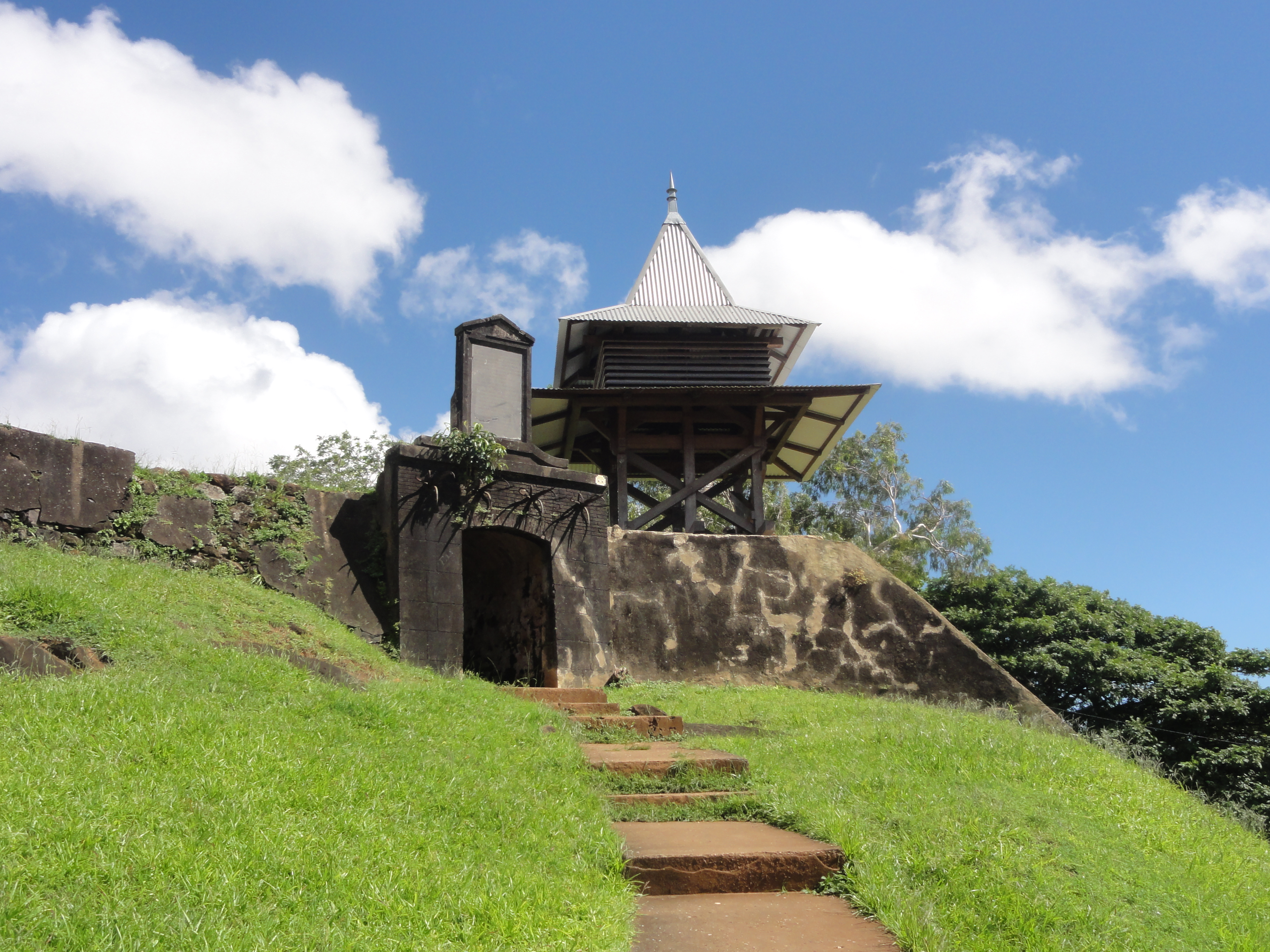
Fort Cépérou

=== Historic houses ===
Maison Thémire, historic and iconic building of the capital. Today it is a bar-restaurant-hotel.

In recent years the city has renovated a number of historic Creole houses in the city center.

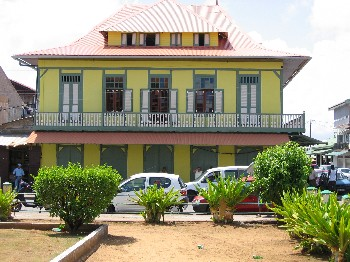
Restored creole house on the place du Coq.

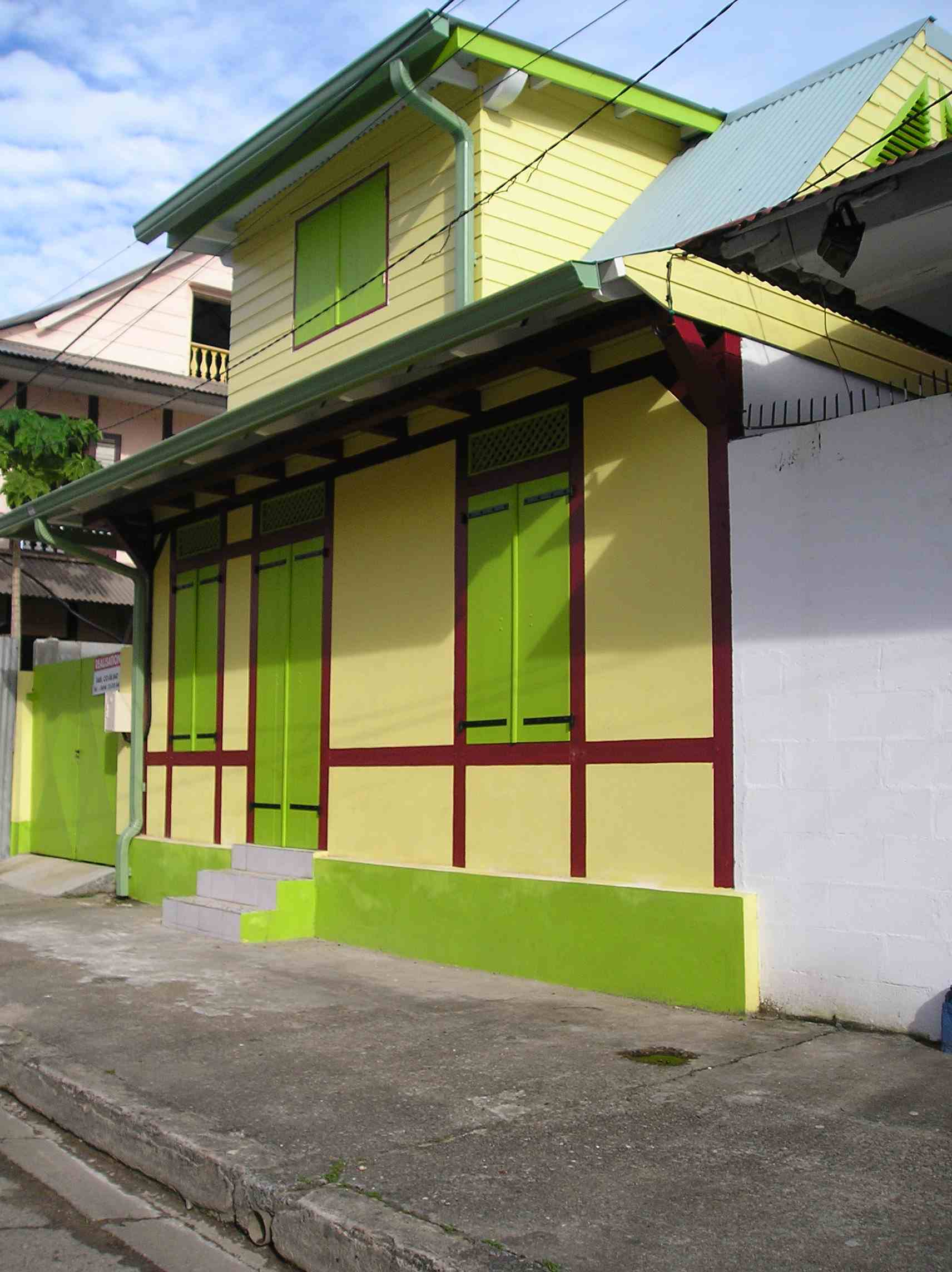
Restored Creole house.

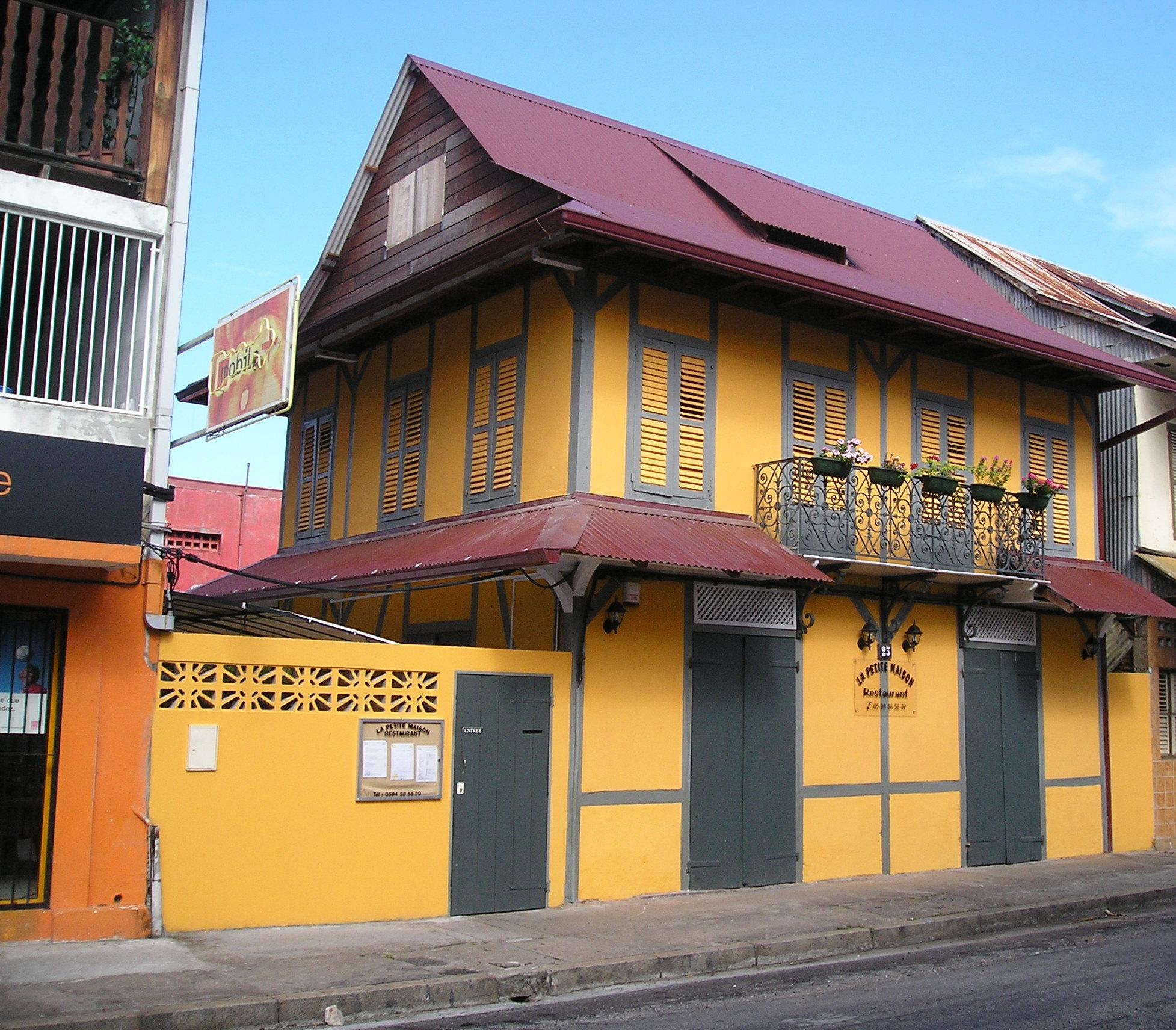
Creole house restored as restaurant.

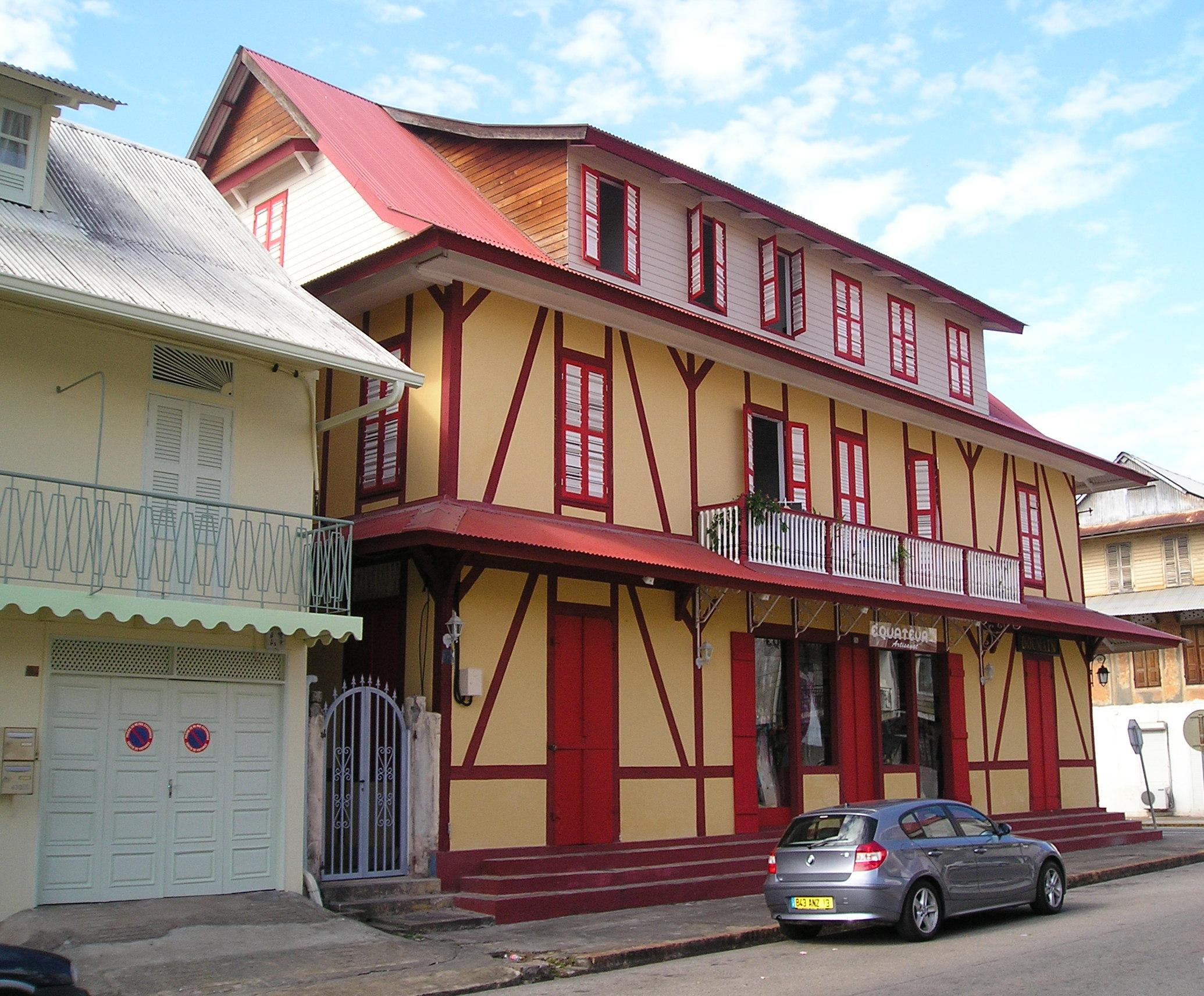
Restored créole home.

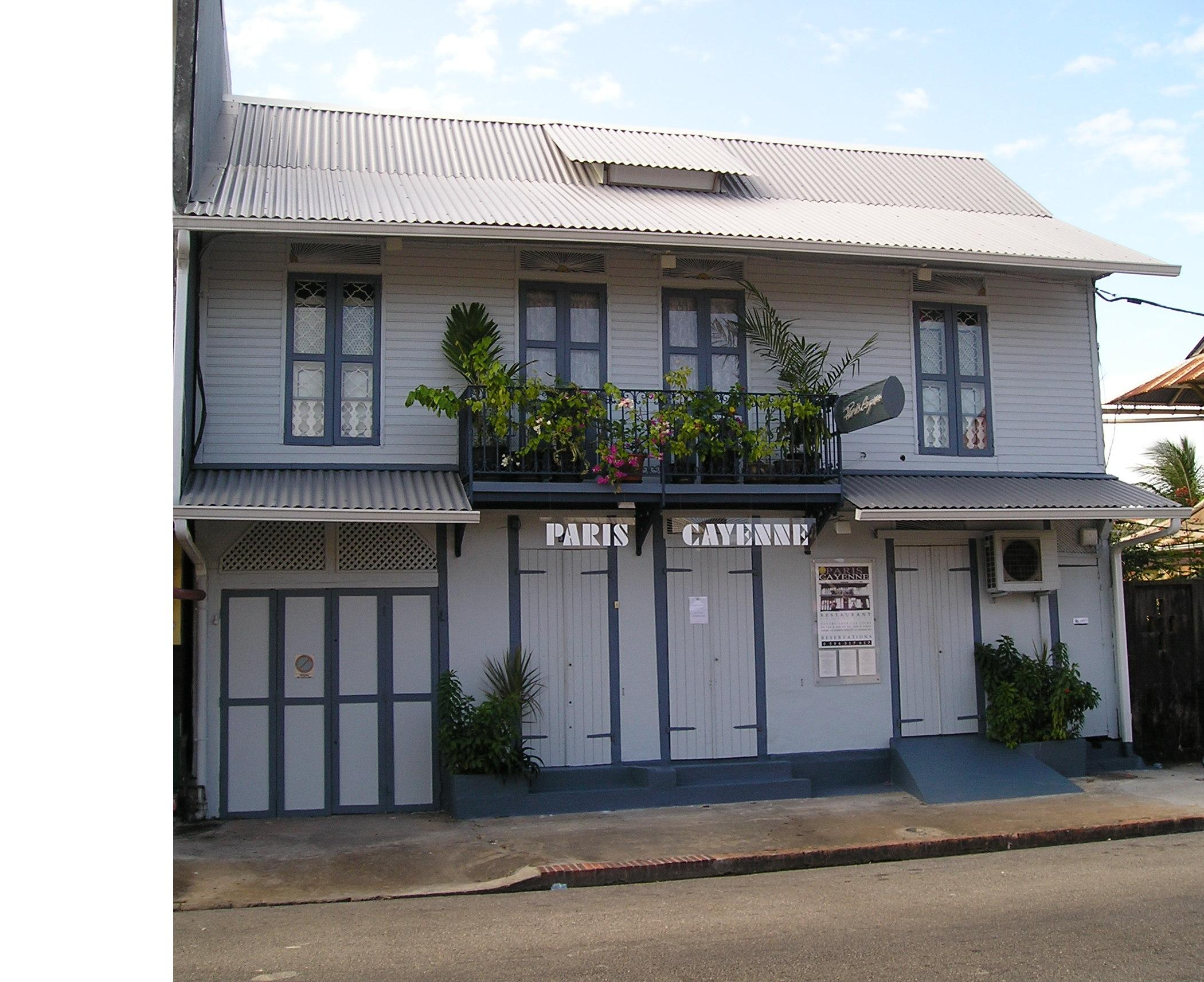
Creole building

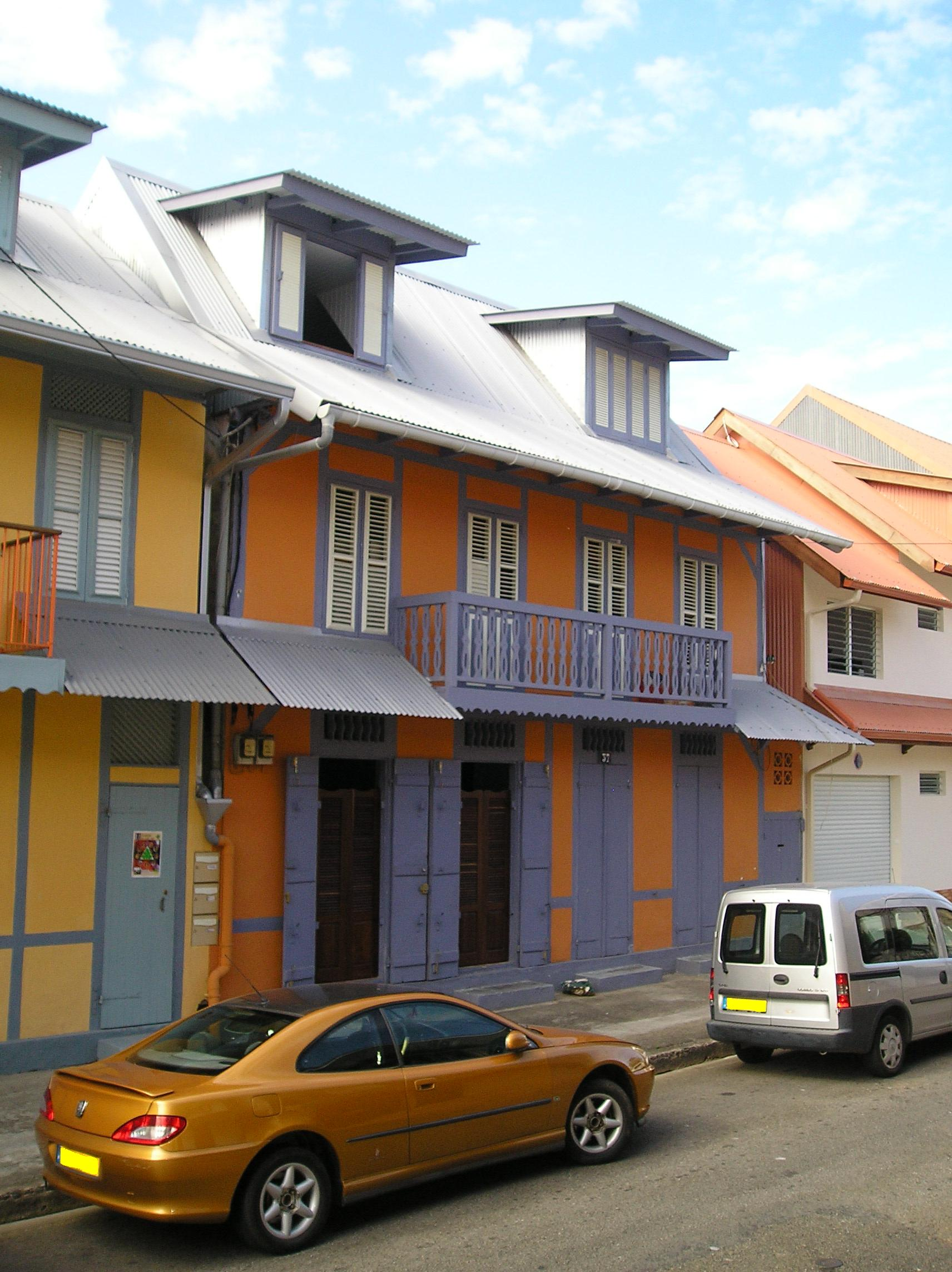
Creole home, restored.

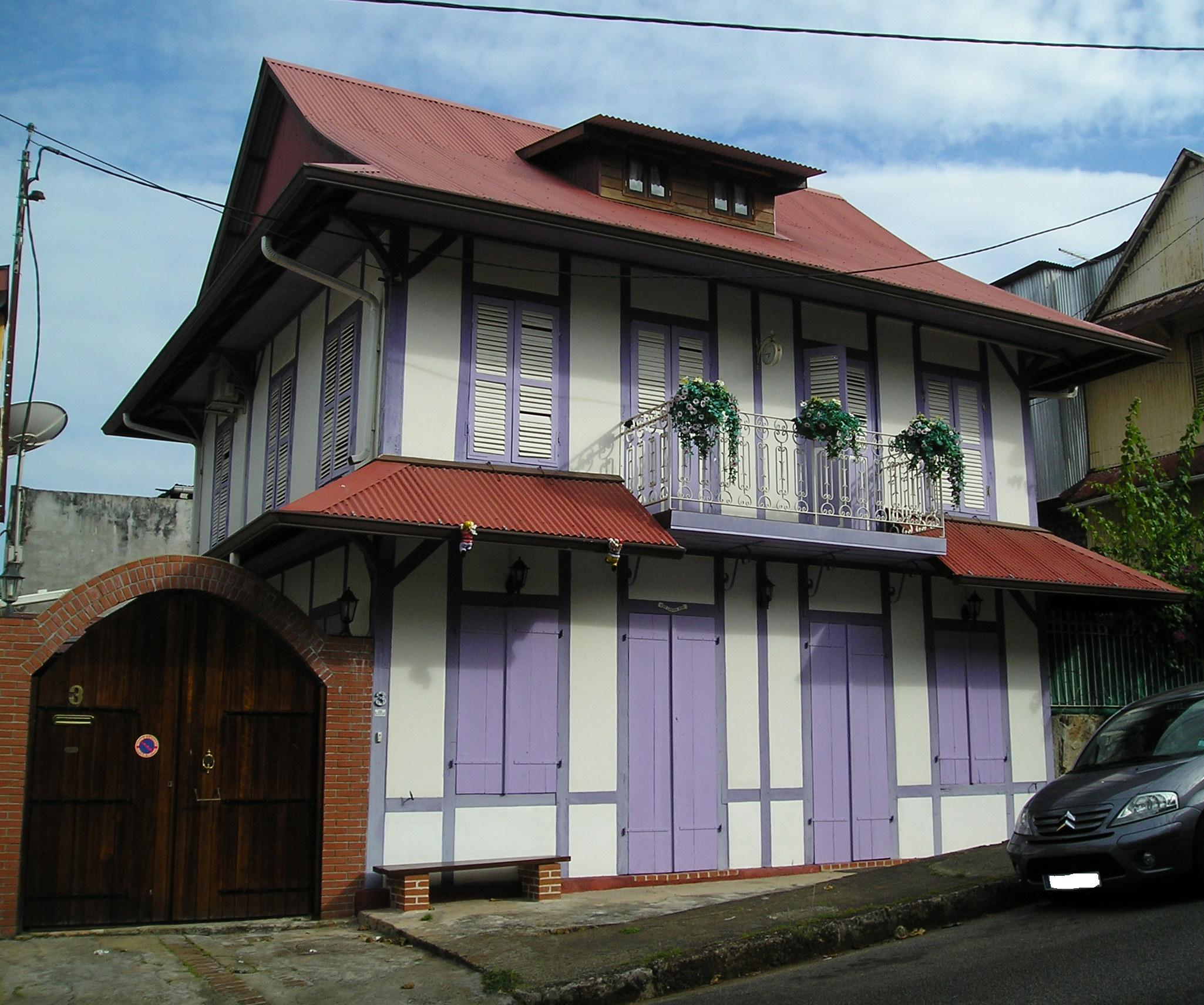
Restored creole home not far from Cépérou.

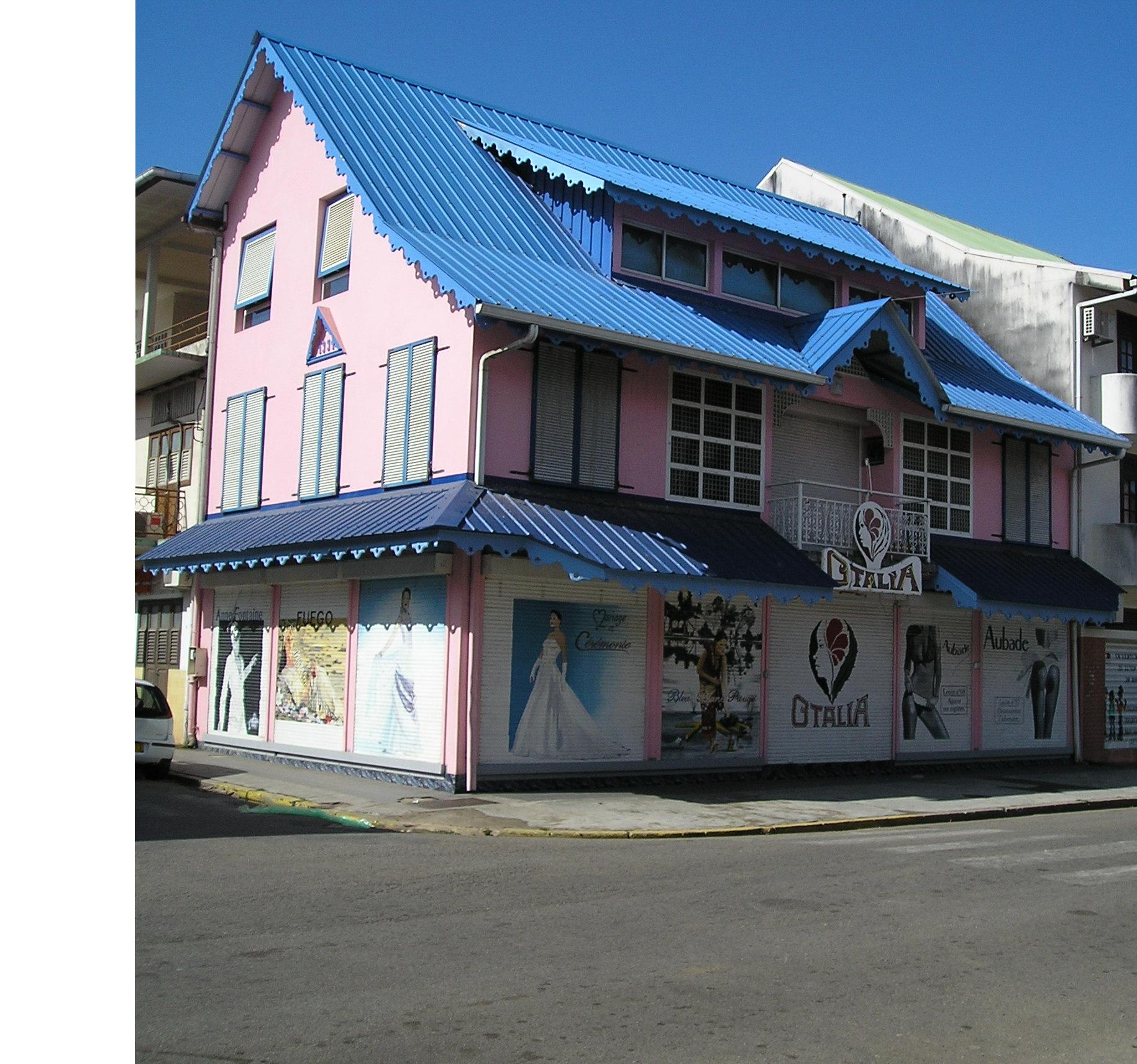
Creole house restored as a business

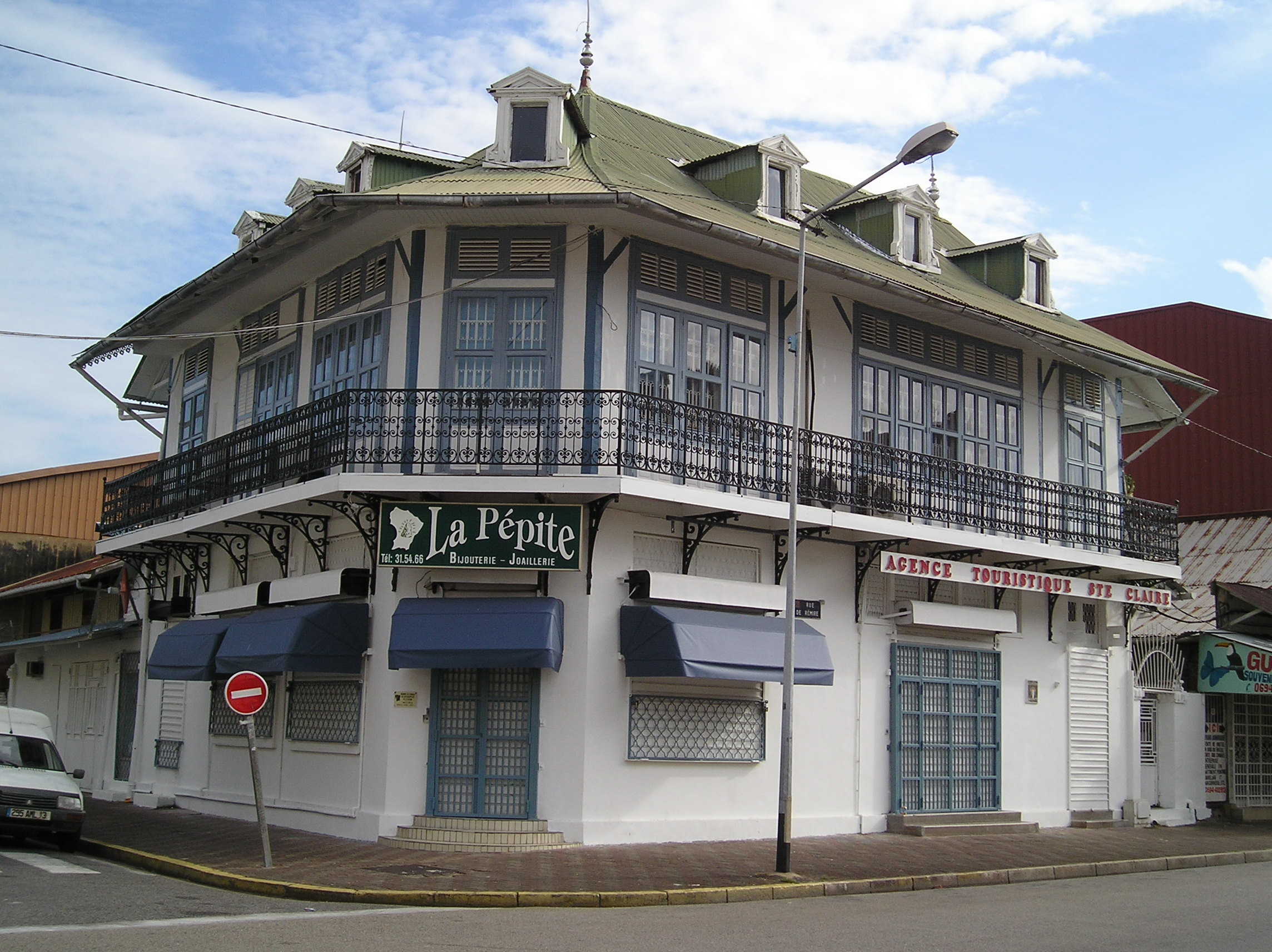
Creole house renovated into jewelry store.

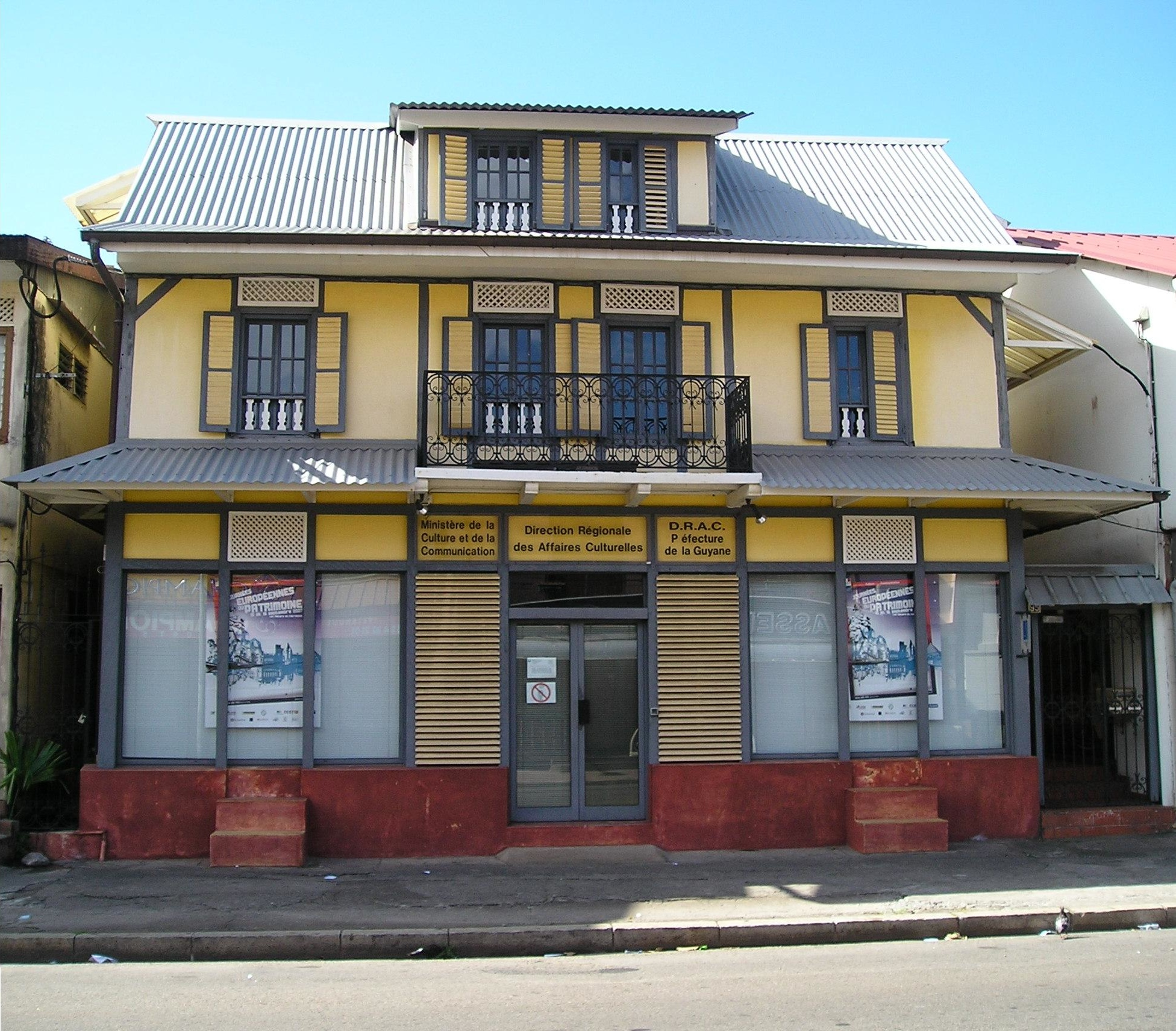
Direction régionale des Affaires culturelles (HQ of Regional Administration for Cultural Affairs)

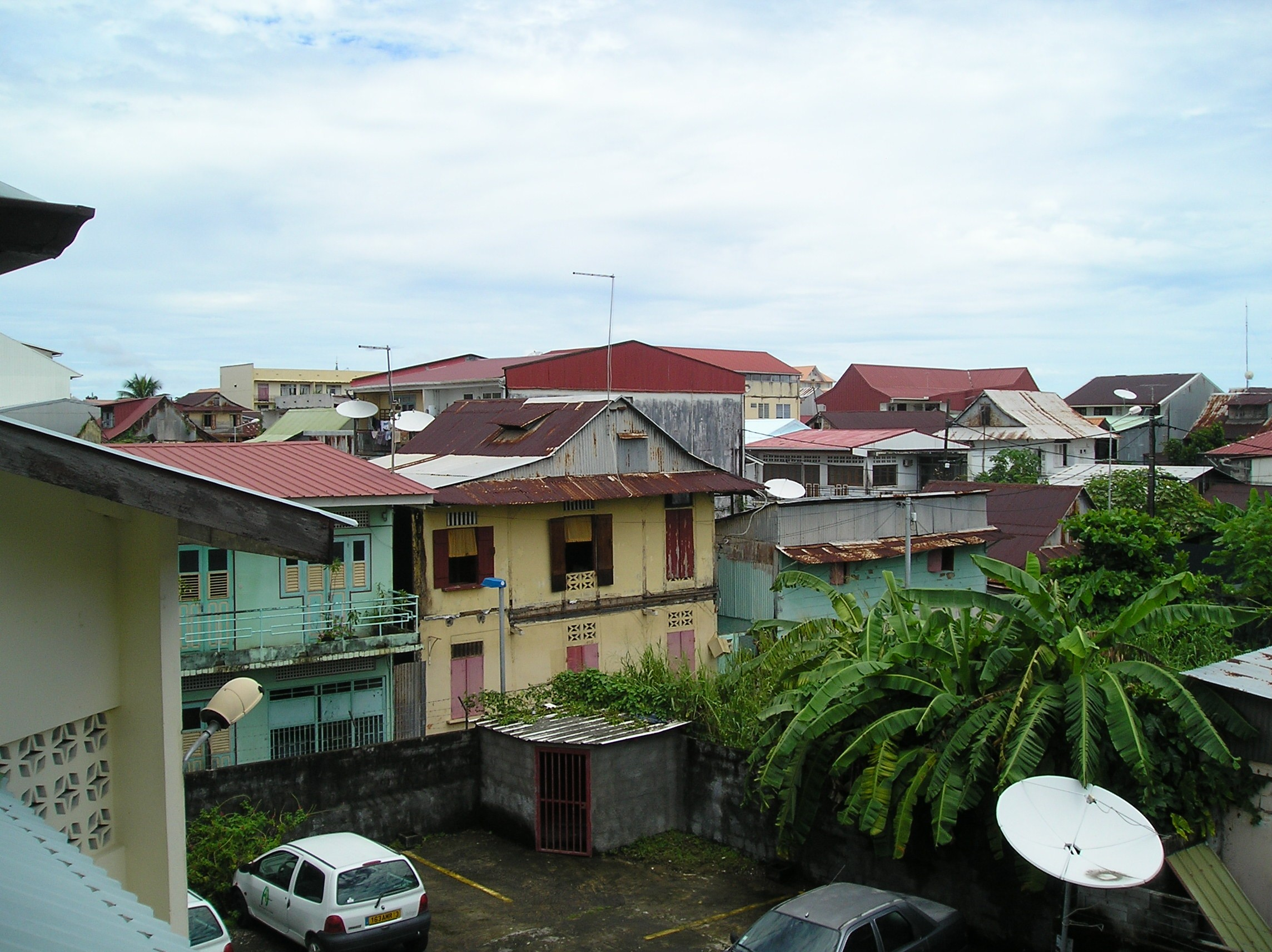
Downtown seen from the roof-tops.

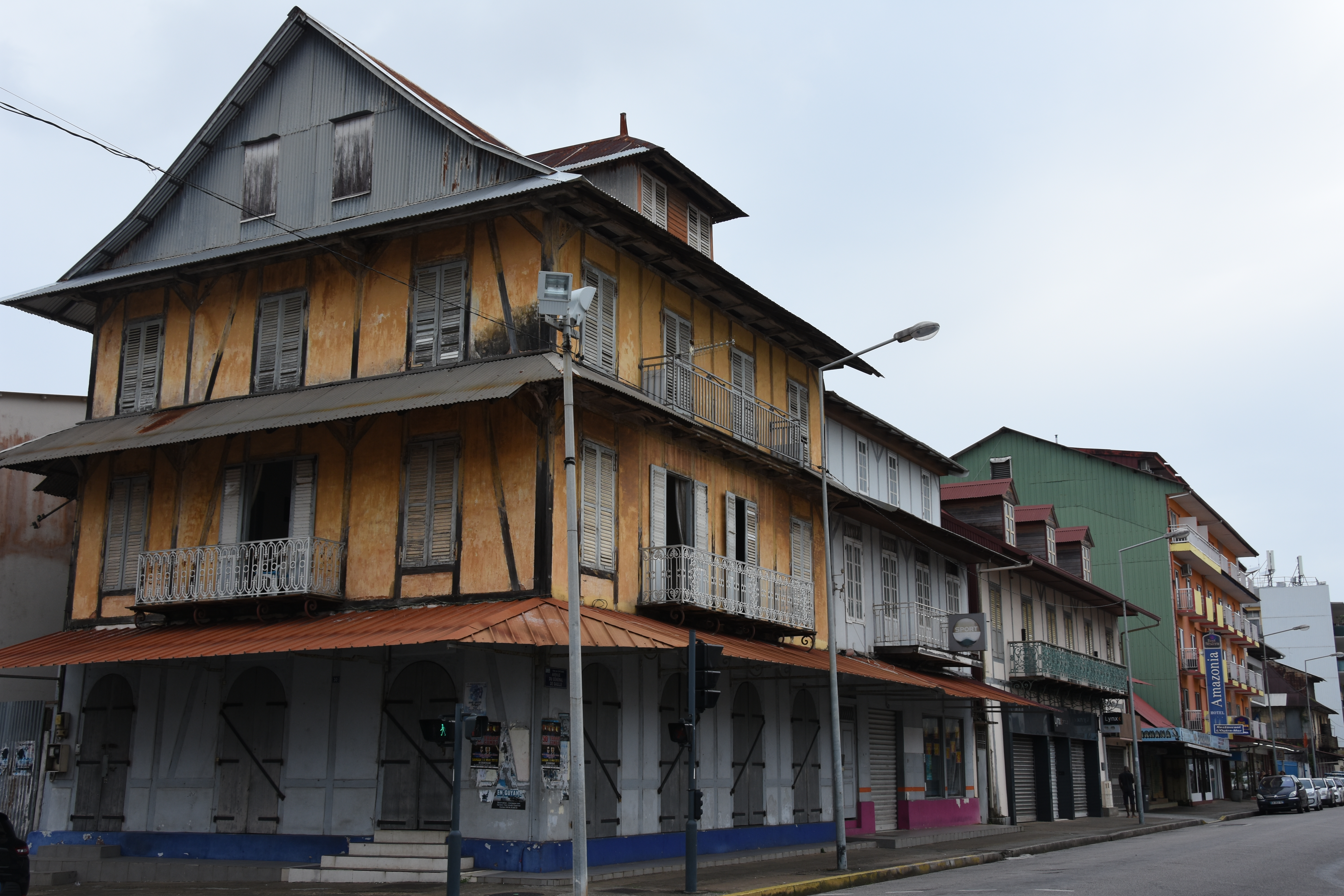
Club Saint-Hubert in Cayenne.

=== Place des Palmistes ===
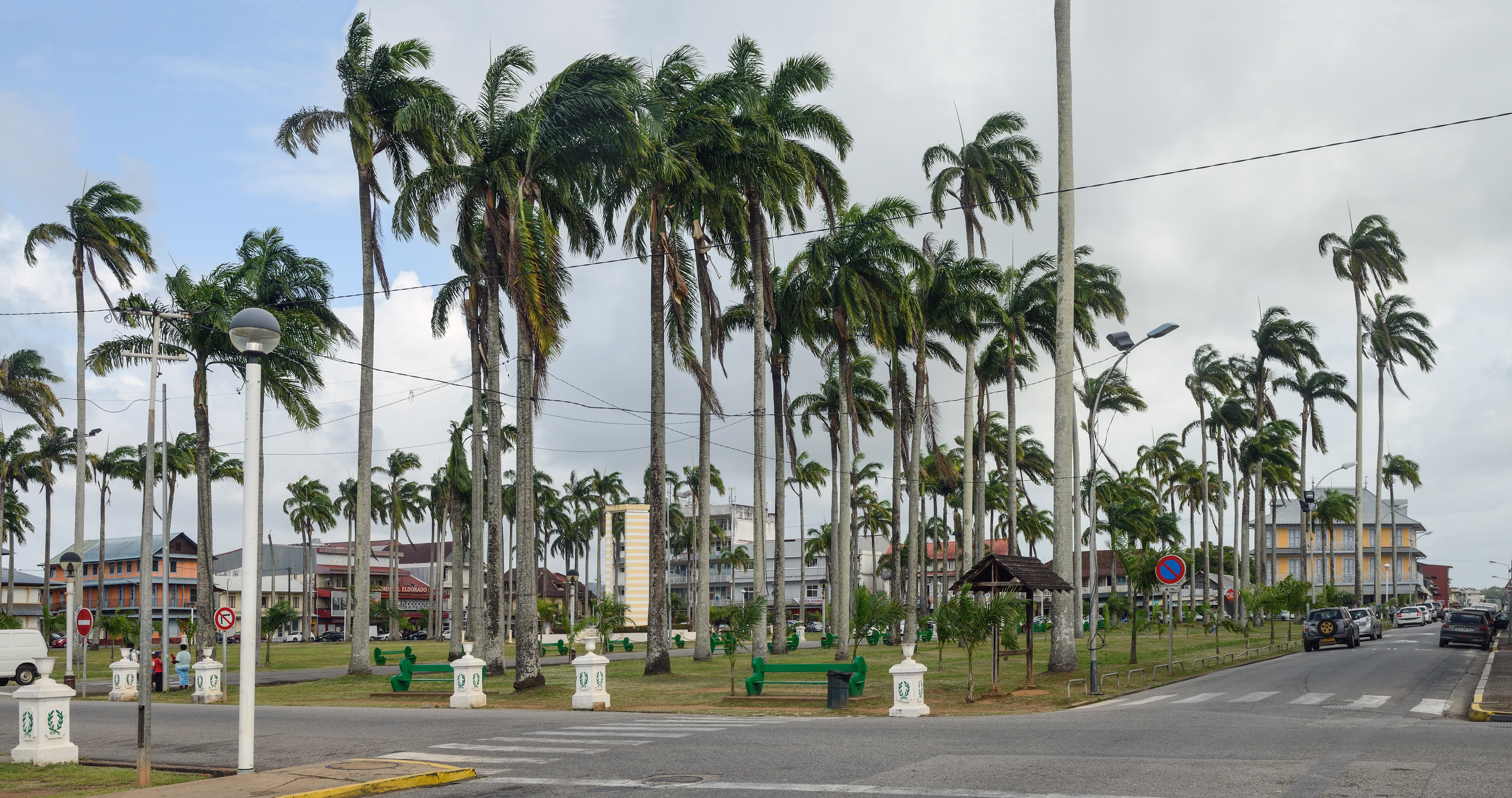
Palmists Plaza

Initially it was a plaza to aerate the city after the demolition of the city walls in 1810. It was named Place de la Savane ("Savanna Square") after the grasses that grew there. Later some royal palms from the area of Guisanbourg were planted there, and the plaza was renamed Place des Palmistes ("Royal Palms' Square"). In 1880, a bronze column was erected bearing the bust of the Marianne, commemorating the seizure of the Bastille. Governor Gaston Gerville-Reache transformed the plaza into an English garden, with artificial hills, masses of flowers and ornamental plants. Because it regularly flooded in the rain, Governor Marc Chanel in 1925 bordered it with a network of cemented canals, still there to this day. A statue of Félix Éboué, an illustrious Guianan, stands at the Merlet fountain. Today it is a lively place where the residents meet. In the evening, food carts sell French fries, sandwiches, local juices and other street food, and bami and lassi (Javanese delicacies brought in by way of Suriname).

=== Botanical garden ===
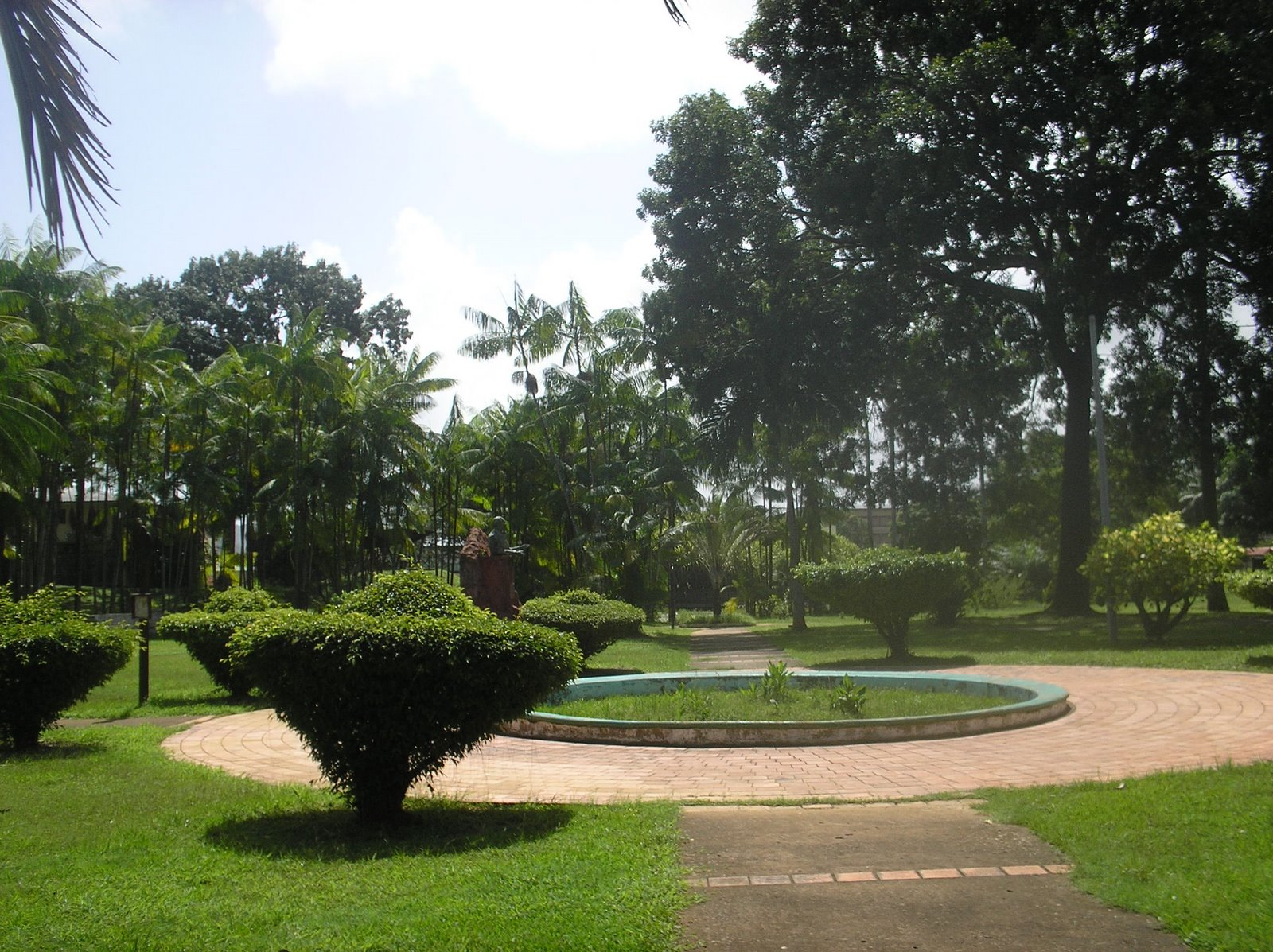
Botanical garden of Cayenne, with a statue of Gaston Monnerville statue at its center.

In 1786, Louis XVI had a garden that served as a storehouse and nursery for various plants and trees from various locations. Louis Claude Richard, director of the garden, brought from India nutmeg trees, rattan, cardamom and black pepper vines. At this period, it was called King's Garden. In 1821 a house was built for the botanist. In 1879, the park changed its name and became the Botanical Garden, a floral park in the city center. It covers an area of three hectares. A statue of Gaston Monnerville stands in the garden's center.

=== Market and Place du Coq ===
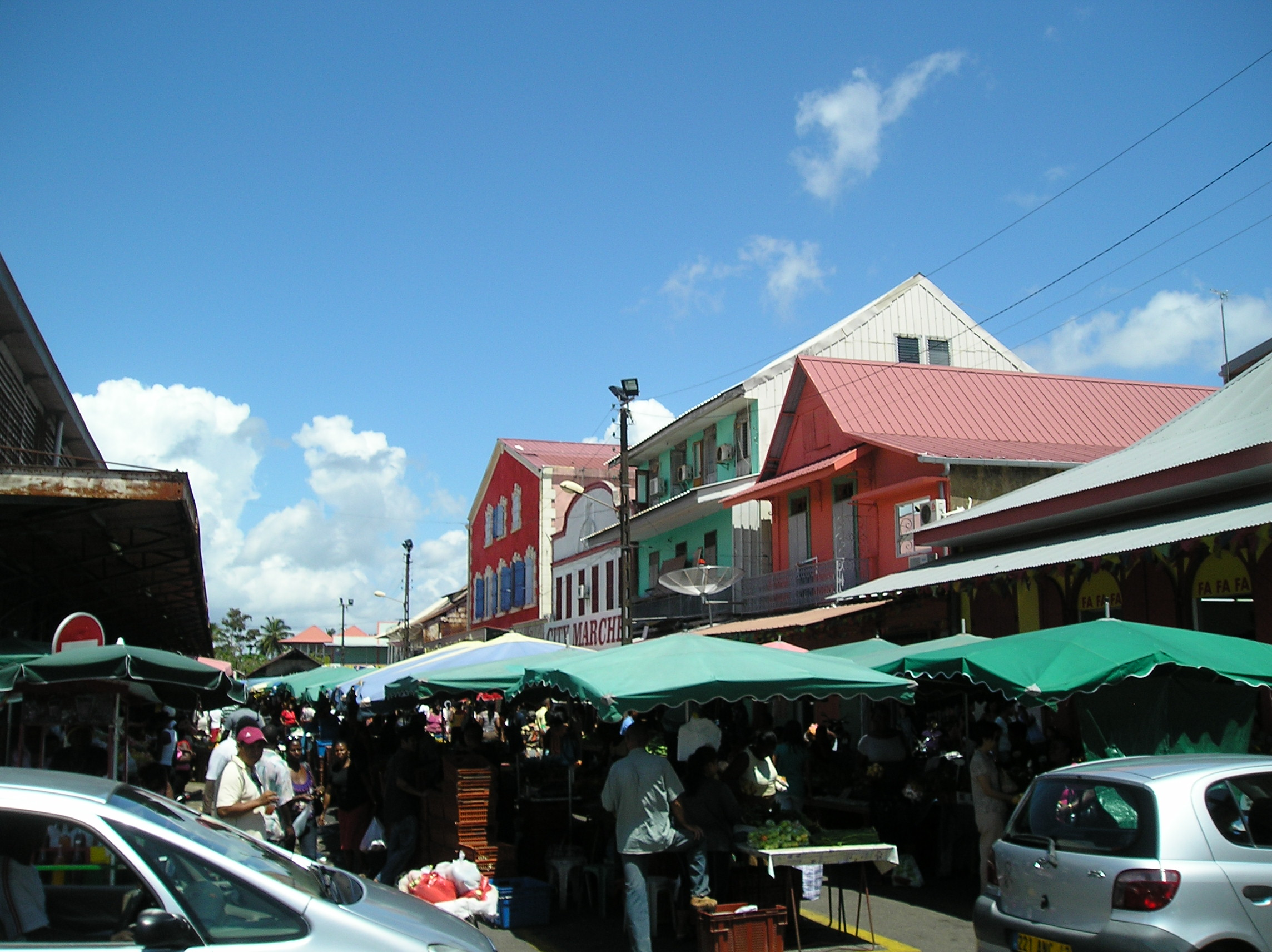
Right aisle of the Cayenne market.

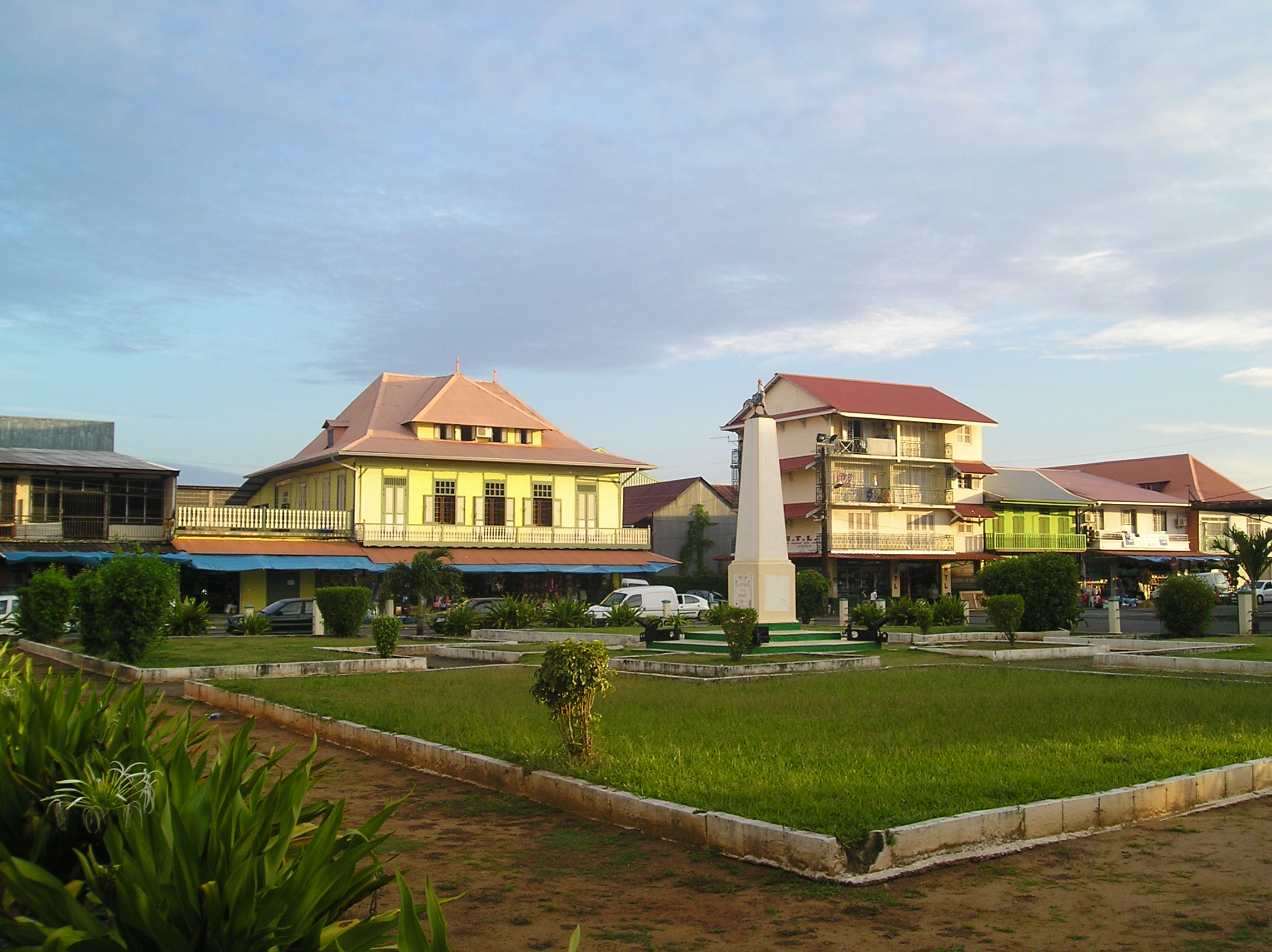
La place du Coq.

These two adjoining buildings are located near the old port of Cayenne. As early as 1703, a Place du Port appears on a map of the city of Cayenne. It then became Place du Marché in 1842. In 1888, a covered market and a public garden were built there. In 1907 the municipal council led by mayor Eugène Gobert decided to remove the garden and build a new covered market, the one we know today. In 1920 the war memorial of the First World War was inaugurated on the site of the old market, surmounted by a rooster, which gave the place its current name.

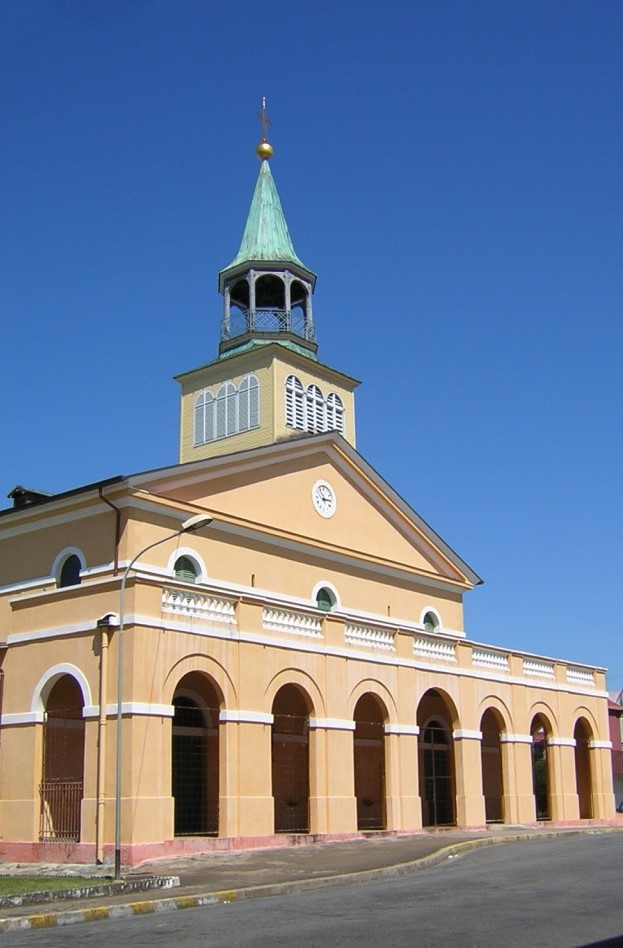
Cayenne Cathedral is the seat of the Roman Catholic Diocese of Cayenne.

=== Village Chinois ===
The village chionois (Chinese Village) in Cayenne is located on the edge of the city's center along the Cayenne River. Colloquially known as la Crique or Chikago, the neighborhood is reportedly a top destination for internal migration from elsewhere in French Guiana.

== Culture ==
=== Carnival of Cayenne ===
The carnival is one of the major events of the capital. It takes place between Epiphany in early January and Ash Wednesday in February or March.

==== Description and origin ====
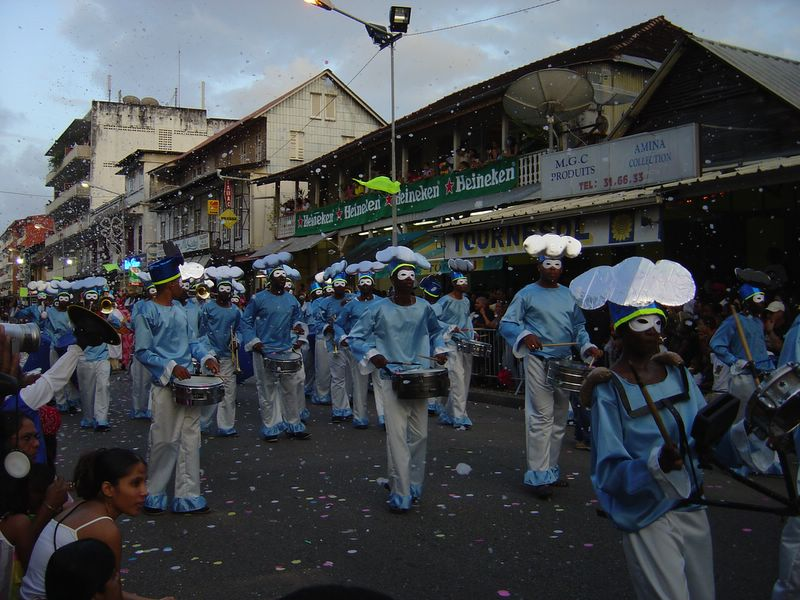
Carnival parade in the streets of Cayenne in 2006.

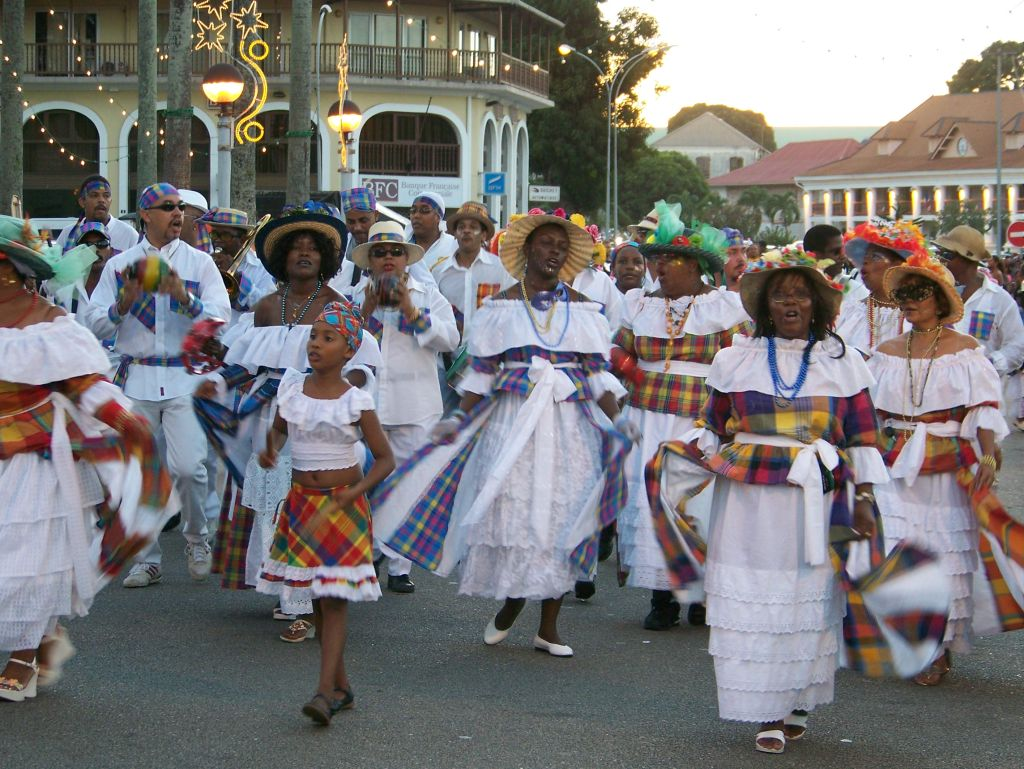
Carnival parade in Cayenne in 2007

This festival is part of the Guianan Creole culture. It was originally a carnival as practiced in Europe. In early colonial times, the settlers held the carnival, but it was forbidden to slaves. Braving the ban, slaves held clandestine festivals to regain some freedom, celebrate Africans, fertility and harvest, and make fun of the settlers.

The fat days close the carnival:

- Fat Sunday: day of the grand parade, the biggest carnival parade, where groups compete for prizes for their performance.
- Fat Monday: burlesque marriages; men dress up as brides and women as grooms.
- Mardi Gras (Fat Tuesday): carnival goers parade as Diab rouj (red devils), everyone dressed in red and black.
- Ash Wednesday: she-devils dressed all in black and white bury Vaval, the king of the carnival.

==== Carnival of the streets ====
Groups disguised according to the theme of the year march to the rhythm of drums and brass in a parade around decorated floats. These groups prepare for months for to parade in front of thousands of spectators massed on the sidewalks and the stands erected for the occasion.

The best-known groups are:

- Kassialata
- Reno Band
- OsBand
- les Belles de la Madeleine

Brazilian bands, like those at the Rio Carnival, are known for their rhythmic and costume design, and the Asian community of Cayenne brings dragons to the parade as well.

==== Masked balls ====
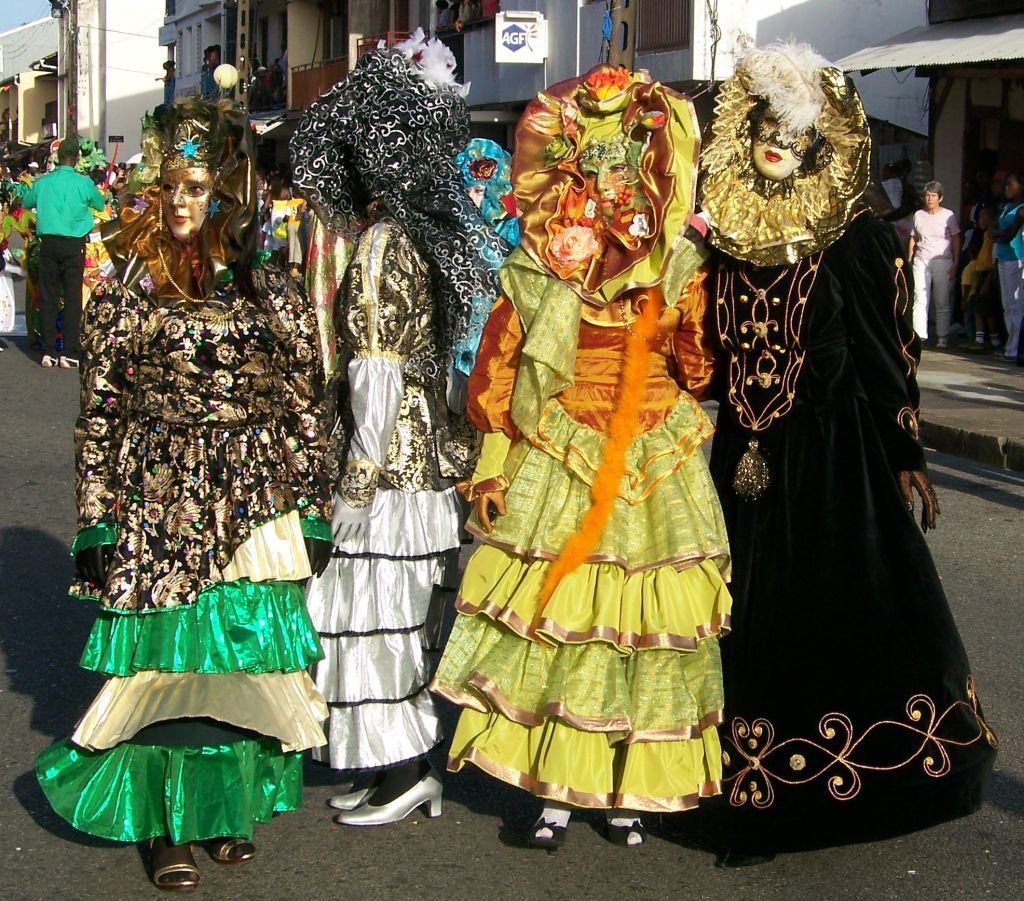
Touloulous in the Cayenne streets in 2007.

Nightclubs, called "universities" in this context, organize masked balls in which men come to dance with Touloulous at soirées held on Friday and Saturday nights. This tradition is peculiar to French Guiana, and does not exist anywhere else.

The carnival dances are the polka, mazurka, biguine and piké djouk. The Touloulou invite the men to dance, and the men cannot refuse. Only Touloulous have the right to dance, and if a undisguised woman tries to dance, the orchestra stops playing.

Since the 1990s, tololo parties have been held where men disguise themselves and play the role of the Touloulous, inviting undisguised women to dance. These evenings are more and more popular and take place several times during the carnival.

The family carnival

Families gather every week to eat king cake, a European tradition observed throughout the carnival. The cake can be frangipane, cream, coconut or guava.

After the abolition of slavery in 1848, the economy of French Guiana was devastated, and much of the population lived by working the land in “habitations”. People farmed and knew the value of working together. The tradition of the king cake was born in the Guiana of this period, or more precisely, “rend le bouquet”. One couple organized the meal and celebration, and at its end designated the couple who would organize the following gathering by handing them the bouquet.

== Main sights ==
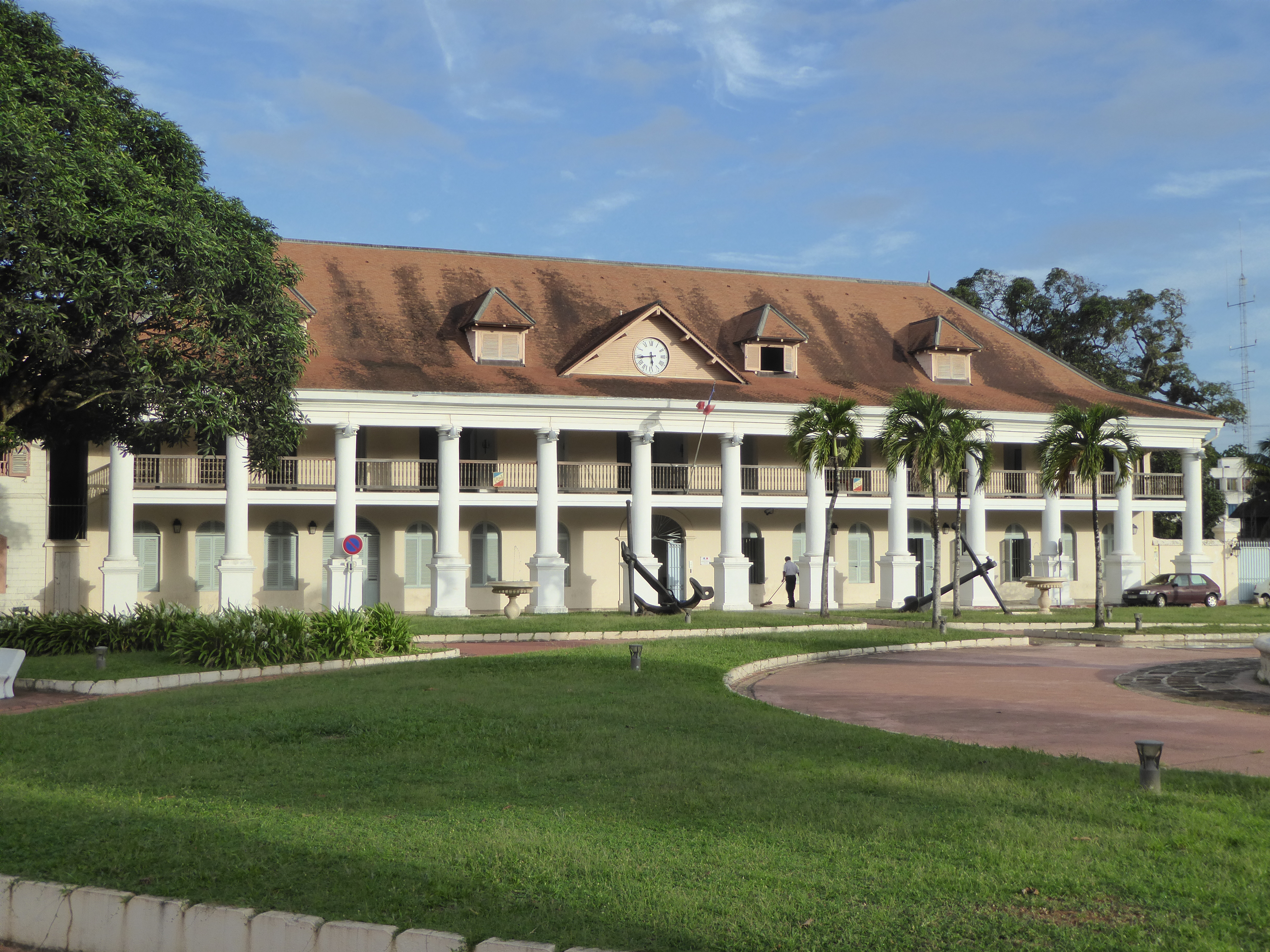
Prefecture building.

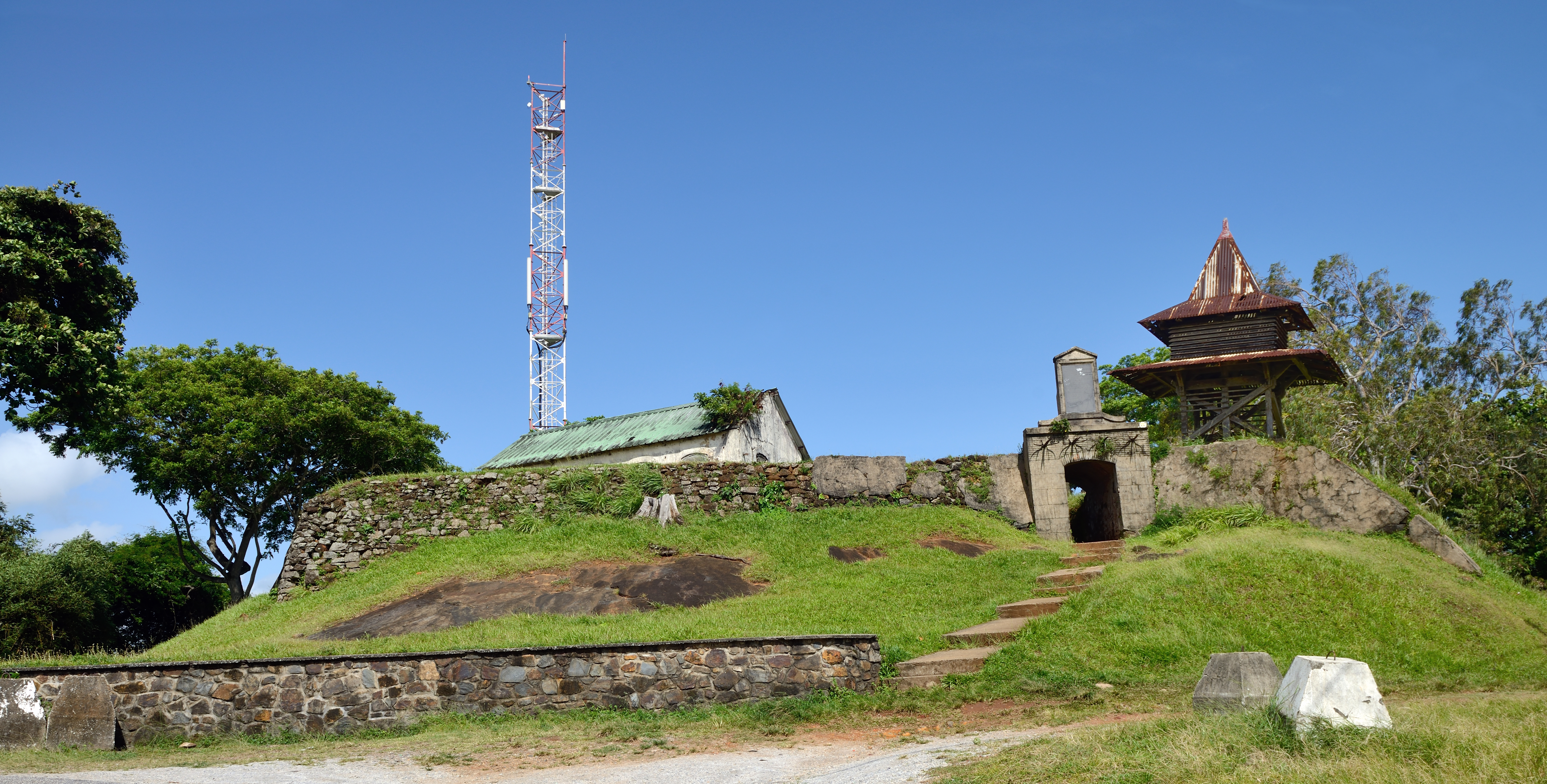
Remains of the Fort Cépérou.

Cayenne centres on its main commercial street, the Avenue Général de Gaulle. At the east end of the avenue near the coast is the Place des Palmistes and the Place de Grenoble (also known as the Place Léopold Héder). Most of the official buildings are located in this area: the Hôtel de Ville (town hall), the Post Office, the Préfecture, residence of French Guiana's Préfect, and the Musée Départmental Franconie. To the west of this area lies Fort Cépérou, built in the 17th century, though now mostly in ruins. To the south lie the Place du Coq and Place Victor Schoelcher (named in honour of the anti-slavery activist) and a market. The Hôtel de Ville was completed in 1924.

To the south of this compact region is the Village Chinois (known as Chicago), separated from the rest of Cayenne by the Canal Laussat. It has a reputation for being a dangerous area.

Other buildings in the city include Cayenne Cathedral, municipal library, the municipal museum and a museum of French Guianese Culture (Musée des Cultures Guyanaise) and a scientific research institute (IRD or Institut de recherche pour le développement, formerly Orstom). The Jardin botanique de Cayenne is the city's botanical garden.

== Transport ==
Cayenne is served by the Cayenne – Félix Eboué Airport, which is located in the neighbouring commune of Matoury.

French Guiana's main seaport is the port of Dégrad des Cannes, located on the estuary of the Mahury River, in the commune of Remire-Montjoly, a south-eastern suburb of Cayenne. Almost all of French Guiana's imports and exports pass through the port of Dégrad des Cannes. Built in 1974, it replaced the old harbour of Cayenne which was congested and could not cope with modern traffic.

Cayenne is connected to Saint-Laurent-du-Maroni via the Route nationale 1, and to Saint-Georges via the Route nationale 2.

== Education ==
Cayenne is home to the University of French Guiana, formerly a campus of the University of the French West Indies until a strike concerning university funding led to the creation of a separate institution in 2014.

== In popular culture ==
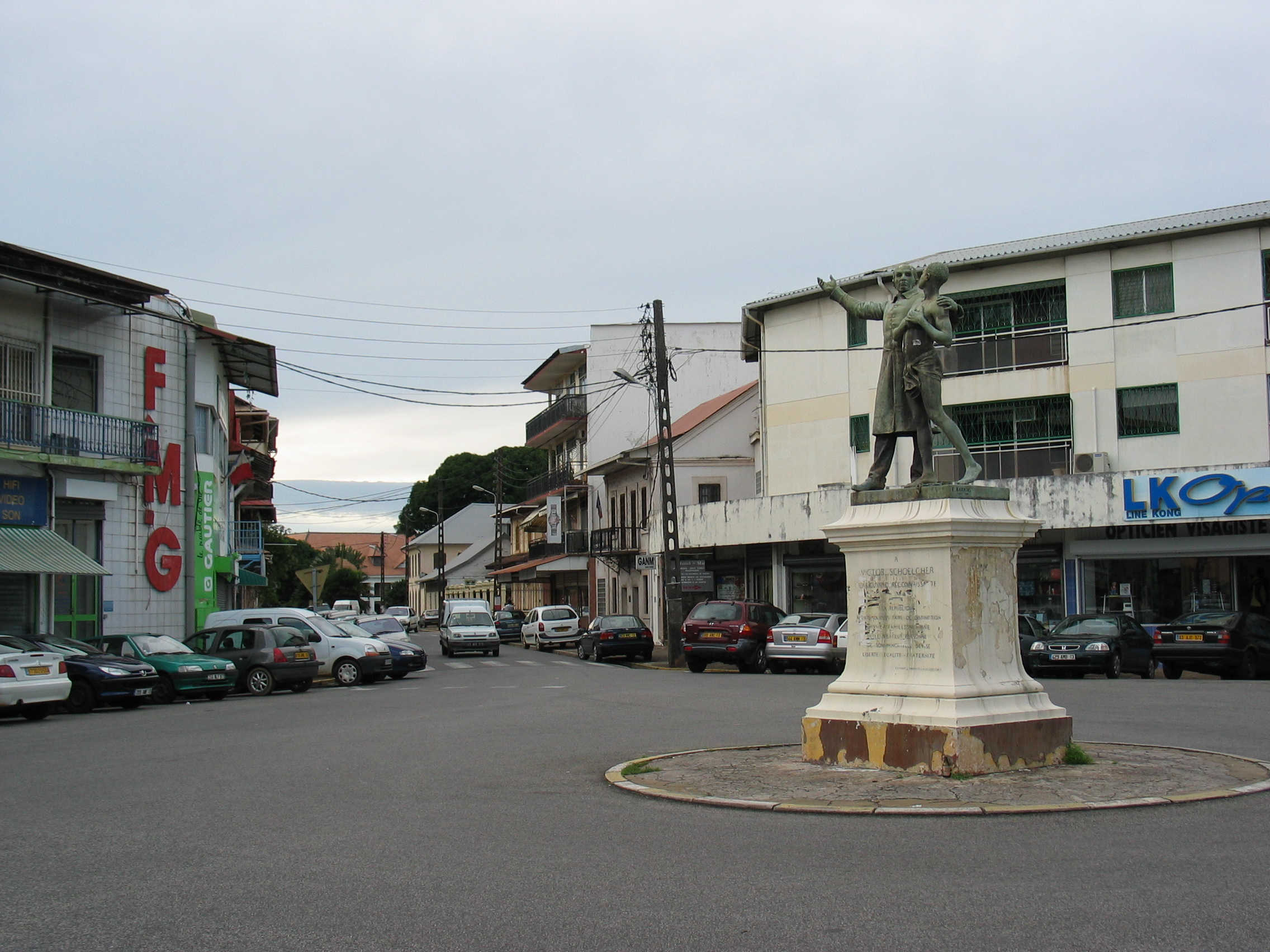
Victor-Schoelcher square

In The Hardy Boys #12: Footprints Under the Window, the Hardys' investigations take them to Cayenne.

The 1955 film We're No Angels involves three prisoners who escaped from Devil's Island and settled incognito into a family store in Cayenne.

== Notable people ==
- Élie Castor, politician and author
- Léon Damas, poet and politician
- Félix Éboué, governor of Guadeloupe and colonial administrator of French Equatorial Africa
- Eddy Gaumont, jazz musician
- Antoine Karam, politician
- Gaston Monnerville, politician
- Suzanne Amomba Paillé, planter and philanthropist
- Henri Salvador, comedian and singer
- Gabriel Serville, politician
- Christiane Taubira, politician
- Sylviane Vayaboury, author
- Mike Maignan, footballer
- Jean-Clair Todibo, footballer
- Emmanuel Prince, politician and carnival leadership figure

== See also ==
- Cayenne (Dutch colony)
- Cayenne pepper
- Communes of French Guiana
- Îlet la Mère, island belonging to Cayenne
- List of colonial and departmental heads of French Guiana
