= Carnival of Cayenne =

French Guiana carnival

Carnival of Cayenne Carnaval de Cayenne
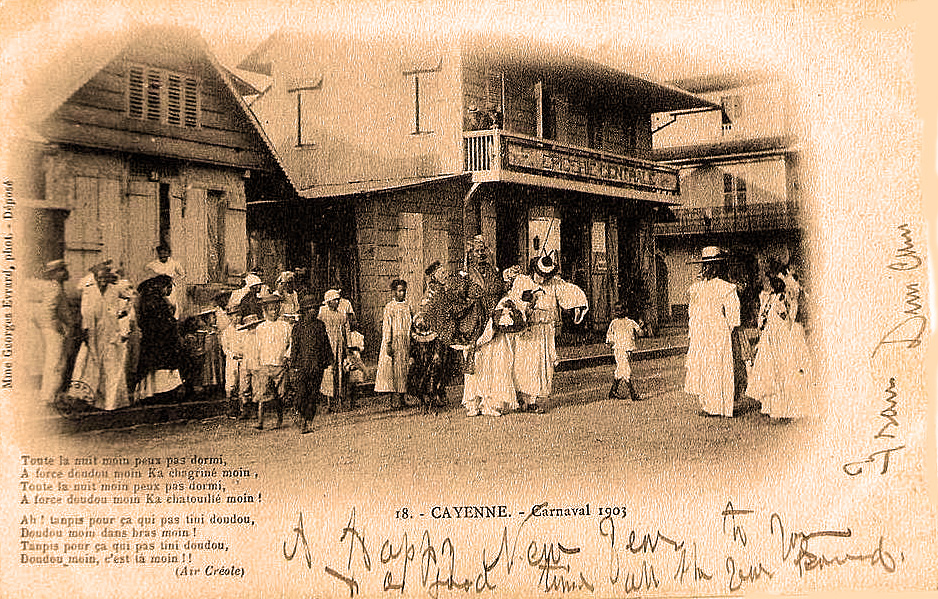
- Carnaval of Cayenne in 1903.
- Status: active
- Genre: Carnival
- Frequency: Annually
- Location: Cayenne
- Country: French Guiana (France)
- Attendance: up to 20 thousand

The Carnival of Cayenne is an annual event held in Cayenne, French Guiana. Alongside the Kourou Carnival and the Saint-Laurent Carnival, it is one of the most significant carnivals in the region.

The highlight of the carnival is the Parade of Cayenne (also known as the Parade of the Capital), featuring groups from Metropolitan France, Suriname, Brazil, and Caribbean, all of whom are invited to participate.

== History ==
The carnival has its roots in Guianan Creole culture, which was influenced by European colonization of the Americas from the 15th to the 19th centuries. During this time, carnivals organized by French settlers excluded slaves from participating. In response, the slaves created a festival of their own in secret as a way to reclaim a sense of freedom, celebrate fertility and bountiful harvests, and to satirize and mock the settlers.

The duration of the carnival varies each year and is determined by religious festivals. It typically takes place between Epiphany, which occurs at the beginning of January, and Ash Wednesday, which marks the start of Lent and is calculated based on the date of Easter in either February or March. The carnival festivities span from Friday evening to Monday morning.

The "grass days" mark the conclusion of the carnival, culminating on Ash Wednesday.

== Traditional costumes ==
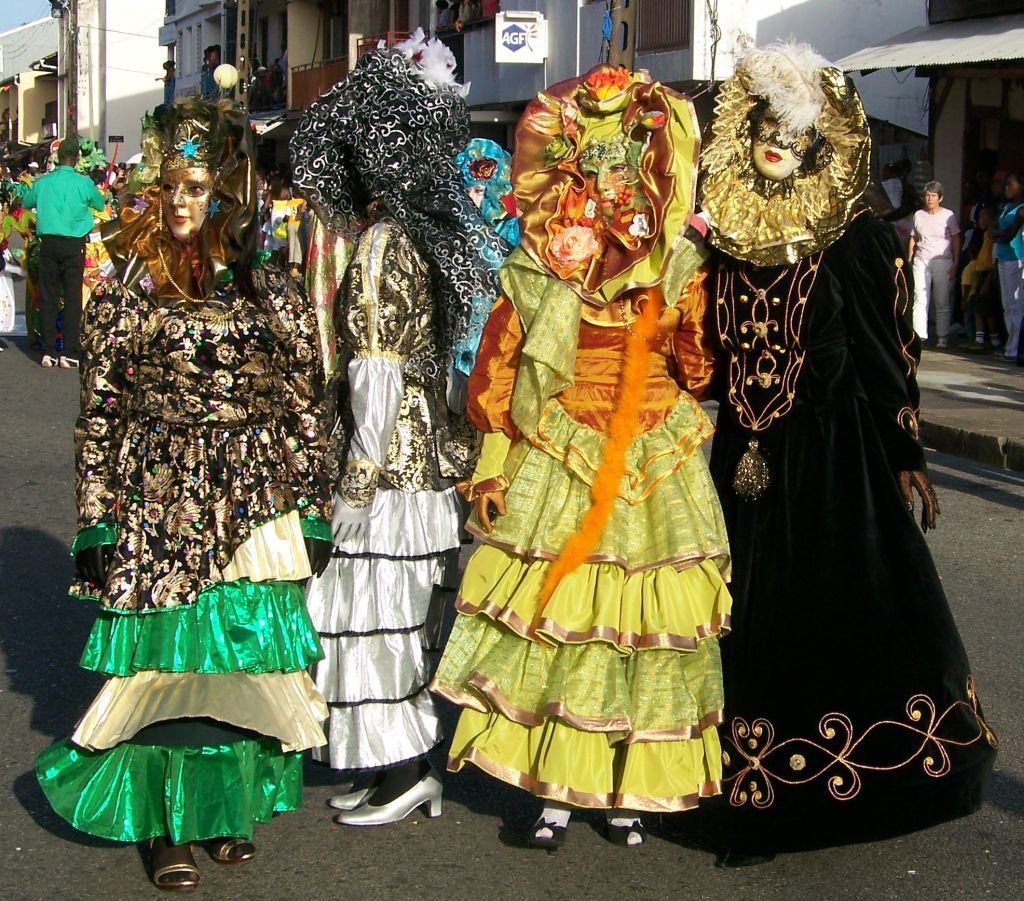
Touloulous in the streets of Cayenne in 2007.

The Guianan carnival features several traditional costumes that represent mythical figures.

=== King Vaval ===
The mythical figure of the carnival is known as the "King of the Carnival." The King is ceremoniously inducted at the beginning of the carnival and symbolizes the spirit of the festivities. However, tradition dictates that the King of the Carnival "dies" on Ash Wednesday, only to be reborn like the Phoenix in the following year's celebration.

=== The Touloulou ===
One of the most renowned characters in the carnival is the Touloulou. She is depicted as an elegantly dressed lady from head to toe, wearing a petticoat, a hood, a domino mask, and long gloves, ensuring that no part of her skin is visible. The purpose of this elaborate guise is to prevent her from being recognized. The Touloulou can be seen dancing in the streets and actively participating in masked balls. This character symbolizes the bourgeois women of the 18th and 19th centuries.

=== Negmarons ===
These groups consist of men wearing a distinctive attire called "kalimbé," which includes a red loincloth coated with oil and soot. Additionally, they carry an awara palm seed in their mouths. Their main objective is to maintain order during the parades by clearing the spectators from the streets. These individuals represent fugitive slaves, commonly referred to as "chestnuts."

=== Zonbi baréyé ===
The "zonbi baréyé" (also known as "baré yé") or simply "zonbi" in Guianan Creole is a character representing a zombie.

=== the Jé farin ===
This costume is entirely white and consists of pants, a shirt, a pointed hat, and a mask. It represents a traditional job, that of a baker. According to tradition, children play with this character, and in return, the "farin" (flour) is playfully scattered or sprinkled on them.

=== Bobi ===
Bobi, sometimes referred to as Babi or Bubi, is a character that consists of old bags made of local brown jute potatoes that cover the body. The character is restrained with a leash and represents a hungry bear, possibly inspired by the first showers of bears.

=== Karolin ===
Karolin is portrayed as a wealthy woman adorned with gold and jewelry, and she insists that her husband carries her belongings on his back out of jealousy, intending to safeguard him from other women.

=== Lanmò (death) ===
Lanmò is dressed entirely in white, covering himself from head to toe, and his costume allows him to envelop the spectators. This character symbolizes death.

=== Sousouri (the bat) ===
The Sousouri is a figure dressed in a winged outfit from head to toe, typically black or two-colored. She is often seen as maleficent and known for her vampire-like behavior, as she chases passers-by on the street and "spades" and tickles them.

=== Djab rouj (red devil) ===
The Djab rouj is a devil character dressed in red and black, commonly seen in the streets during Mardi Gras.

=== Other costumes ===
Additionally, there are several other costumes, some of which are considered endangered, including:

- the Annglé bannan
- the Sweepers
- the Bèf vòlò bèf
- the Cane cutters
- the Djab annan bwèt
- the Senegalese Tirailleurs
- the Drainer.

== The carnival of the streets ==
Every Sunday afternoon (usually a little earlier than 3 pm), parades take place in the streets of Cayenne. Groups dressed according to the theme of the year parade around decorated floats, accompanied by the rhythmic beats of drums, brass, and string instruments. The preparation of these groups lasts for several months leading up to the carnival. The parades attract tens of thousands of delighted spectators who gather on the sidewalks and stands specially arranged for the occasion.

The most well-known groups participating in the parades are:

- Kassialata
- Star Apple
- Kalajirou
- Piraye
- Reno Band
- Ijakata
- Kouman
- Chiré Ban'n
- Osband
- The Belles de la Madeleine
- Junior City
- Wanted
- Mayouri Tchô-NèG
- Patawa Folia

In addition to these groups, Brazilian bands similar to those encountered in the Rio Carnival are also appreciated for their rhythms and costumes. The Asian community of French Guiana also actively participates in the parades, adding vibrant dragon displays.

== The carnival of families ==
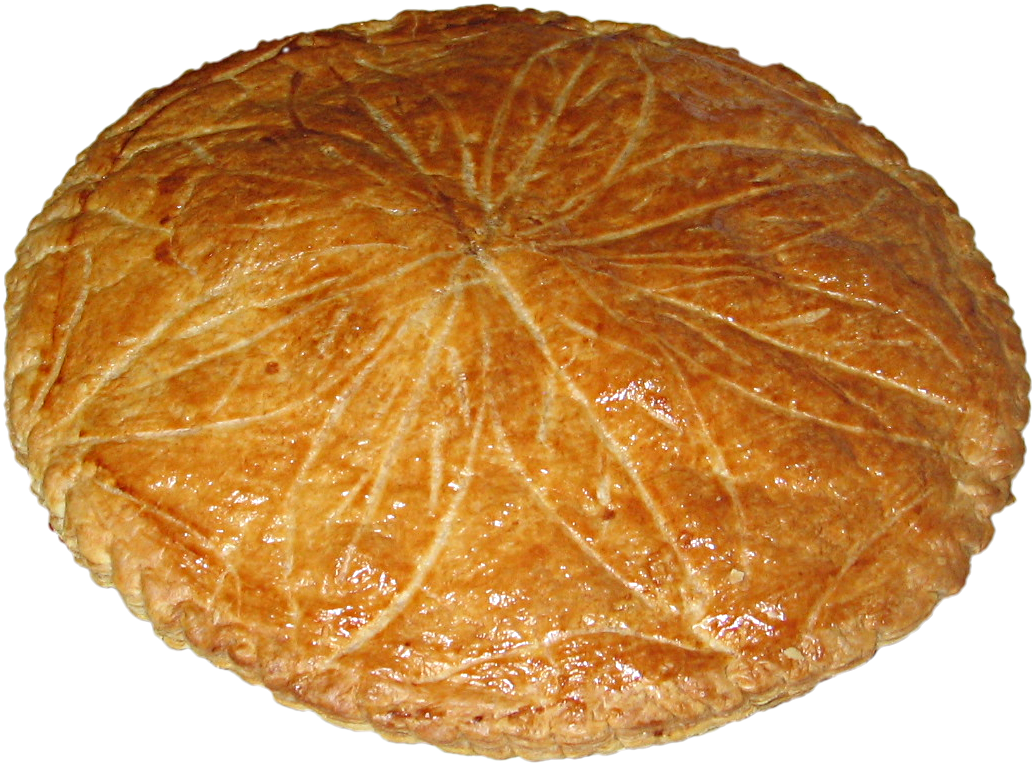
Traditional Galette des Rois.

During the carnival, families come together to enjoy the "galette des rois," a traditional cake known as the "slab of kings" in Europe during the Epiphany, which is extended throughout the carnival period. Usually, the person who finds the hidden token or trinket in the cake becomes the "king" and is responsible for providing the cake at the next gathering. The cake can be made with frangipane, guava, or coconut.

After the abolition of slavery in 1848, Guyana's economy faced challenges, and a large portion of the population lived by working the land in communal settings called "houses." People cultivated the land and understood the value of working together, known as "Mayouri." It was during this time in French Guiana that the tradition of the "cake of the kings," or more precisely the "makes the bouquet," was born. This tradition consisted of a couple organizing a meal and a party, and at the end of the gathering, passing the bouquet to another couple, designating them to organize the next meeting. This tradition is often thought to symbolize the spirit of community and cooperation among the people of French Guiana.

== The paré-masked Ball ==
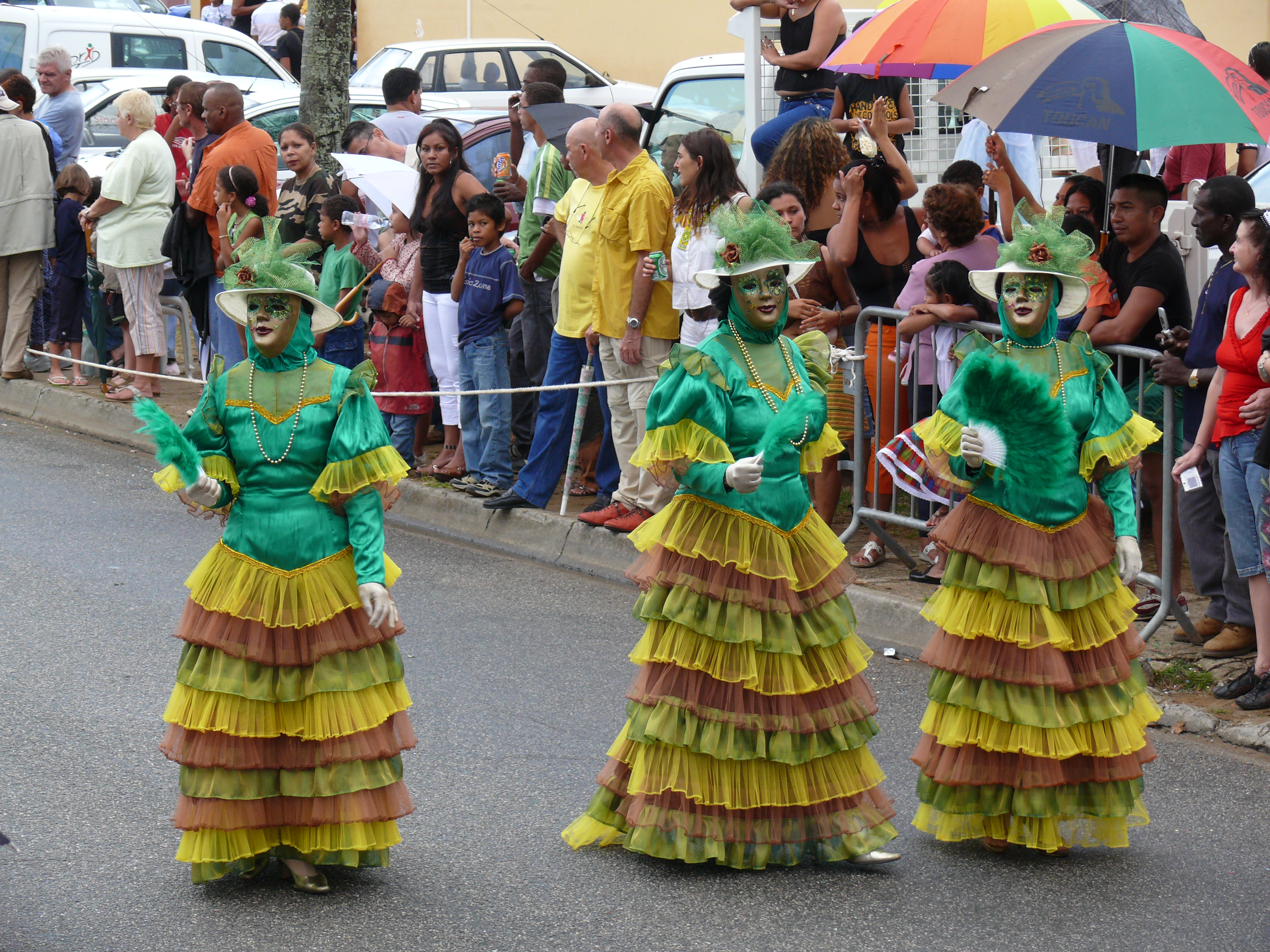
The parade of touloulous.

The "Dancings," also known as "Universities," organize masked balls called "Tololos Ball" where men dress as Touloulous and invite undisguised women to dance. These evenings take place on Friday and Saturday nights, depending on the municipality. This unique tradition is specific to French Guiana and is not found elsewhere, although there are now dancings in Paris and some cities in France that organize similar balls.

The Tololos Ball is a relatively recent innovation, having emerged in the 1990s. During these events, men disguise themselves as Touloulous and take on their role by inviting women to dance. These evenings have gained popularity and now occur multiple times during the carnival, with the most significant one happening on the last Friday before the fat days.

The carnival dances include the mazurka, the polka, the biguine, and the piké djouk. Touloulous have the privilege of inviting men to dance, and the men cannot refuse their invitation. Only Touloulous are allowed to dance, and if an undisguised woman tries to dance, the orchestra stops playing.

In the capital city, there is only one university known as "Nana" or "Soleil levant."

== Carnival Groups ==
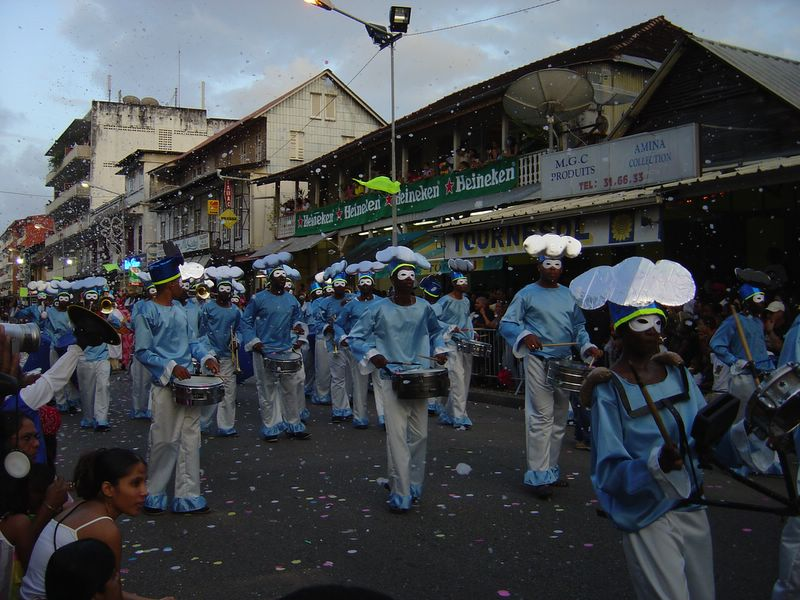
The Blues Stars.

There are several famous carnival groups in French Guiana, including:

- Les Mécènes, who perform in the hall Polina. Their star singer, Bernard Inglis, was a pillar of the Guyanese carnival until his death in 2002.
- Les Blues Stars, known for their performances at Nana (Soleil levant). The image of their star singer, Victor Clet, also known as Quéquette, was printed on the bottles of Rhum Saint-Maurice during the 2006 carnival, due to his popularity.
- Karnivor, a group consisting of Saul Sylvestre (author, composer), 18 musicians, Arnaud Champestaing, and Nadège Chauvet (singer of the group). Karnivor received seven Lindor awards at the Lindor ceremony, which recognizes the achievements of Guyanese artists for their production during the year.

== The Vidés ==
This expression, "empty the room" ball, originated from the tradition of holding videos (vidés) in the early hours of Sunday after Saturday night's masked ball. These vidés encouraged all the dancers to leave the venue and continue the festivities outside on the streets until they eventually returned home.

Initially, there was also a vidé after the last group of the Sunday street carnival in the early evening. A large crowd, including both young and old, would follow a truck on which an orchestra played the lively rhythms of the carnival.

Some of these vidés led to violence between gangs of young people from different neighborhoods, resulting in severe consequences. As a result, these vidés were banned for a long time.

Today, the audience for the vidés mainly consists of enthusiasts who willingly wake up early in the morning to participate in the emptied celebrations.

== See also ==
=== Related articles ===
- Carnival in French Guiana
- Touloulou
- French Guiana
- Emmanuel Prince

=== External links ===
- Media related to Carnival in Cayenne at Wikimedia Commons
