= Emmanuel Prince =

French Guianese cultural official and politician

11th Vice-President of the Collectivité territoriale de Guyane (Culture, Heritage and Transmission)
- Incumbent
- Assumed office 2021
- President: Gabriel Serville

President, EPCC Les Trois Fleuves
- Incumbent
- Assumed office 24 August 2021

Personal details
- Citizenship: French
- Occupation: Cultural official, carnival organiser, politician

Emmanuel Prince is a French Guianese cultural official and local politician. He has been the eleventh vice-president of the Collectivité territoriale de Guyane (CTG), in charge of culture, heritage and transmission, since 2021, and chairs the board of the EPCC Les Trois Fleuves, a public performing-arts body.

He was previously president of the regional carnival union (2012–2016), a role that made him a frequent figure in the local press and on Guyane La 1ère, the local branch of France Télévisions's overseas network. In March 2026 he led a list in the municipal elections in Macouria.

== Early career ==
Emmanuel Prince worked as a contract employee of the former Conseil général from 2008. He was dismissed in 2013; an administrative court annulled the dismissal in early 2014 and awarded him €4,000.

== Carnival ==
=== Context ===
The carnival of French Guiana runs from Epiphany to Ash Wednesday and is held in communes across the territory. The French Ministry of Culture describes it as a flagship popular event of the Guianese cultural calendar. Asked in 2014 whether the carnival was a hostage of politics in municipal-election years, Emmanuel Prince agreed, citing the mix of associations and politics.

=== Union régionale des festivals et carnaval de Guyane (2012–2016) ===
Prince was elected president of the regional carnival union in Sinnamary on 20 October 2012, and said in February 2014 that the union had restored a structured programme and funded the committees. In October 2014 he was elected to the board of the national Fédération des carnavals et festivités de France, responsible for overseas carnivals, after French Guiana had applied for membership.

His tenure was contested. Guyane La 1ère reported in January 2015 that several municipal committees had decided to do without the union's services, and in a radio interview on 2 February 2015 Prince refused to resign after five committees (Cayenne, Rémire-Montjoly, Matoury, Kourou and Saint-Laurent-du-Maroni) publicly disavowed his management. The 2015 carnival was run by the committees alone; Prince called for états généraux of the carnival. His team's four-year mandate ended on 20 October 2016.

=== As CTG vice-president (2021–) ===
In January 2023 he told France-Guyane that partners saw a "blur" in the organisation of the carnival and that a steering committee was preparing a carnival office, with CTG support of €120,000--150,000. The Office du Carnaval Péyi Guyane (OCPG) was created on 30 September 2023 and presented on 2 January 2024; Prince said it was needed to give the carnival "another dimension", according to Guyane La 1ère.

In 2025 Guyane La 1ère reported that the Observatoire régional du carnaval guyanais (ORCG), which had worked ten years on a bid to list the Touloulou with UNESCO, was abandoning the file after the CTG requested a financial review. The ORCG's president named Prince's media presence among her grievances, and Prince declined to comment.

== Other roles ==
Emmanuel Prince was elected president of the board of the EPCC Les Trois Fleuves on 24 August 2021, in the presence of Gabriel Serville.

France Télévisions has interviewed him as culture vice-president on radio (April 2024) and on the television programme La Guyane vous écoute (April 2025).

== Politics ==
Emmanuel Prince led the list "Osons un nouveau cap à Macouria" in the municipal elections of 15 March 2026, interviewed by Guyane La 1ère as a candidate. His list won 873 votes (26.08%) and four of 33 seats, finishing second to the incumbent mayor Gilles Adelson, who was re-elected in the first round with 60.51%. Prince was elected to the municipal and community councils.

In 2026, he joined the political party La France Humaniste.
