= Television Blong Vanuatu =

- Country: Vanuatu
- Broadcast area: Vanuatu
- Headquarters: Port Vila, Vanuatu

Programming
- Languages: Bislama; English; French
- Picture format: 1080i HDTV

Ownership
- Owner: Vanuatu Broadcasting and Television Corporation

History
- Launched: 1993; 33 years ago

Links
- Website: www.vbtc.vu

Television Blong Vanuatu (TBV) is a digital service that is now a joint business venture between BTC and Guilin CEKE Communication Equipment Co Ltd, a Chinese private company that is specialized in digital television. Their studios and offices are located in Port Vila.

This broadcasting station is government-owned and affiliated.

It was established in 1993 with the help of Radio France Overseas (RFO) and used to broadcast six hours daily in French and English. This followed an experimental service that started in an unexpected manner in July 1992.

RFO equipment was installed at the offices of Vanitel and started with a small schedule following the 1992 Summer Olympics, broadcasting four hours a day. A studio opened in 1995, in conjunction with the country's fifteenth anniversary of independence. The first local television news bulletin aired on June 3, 1996, and were carried out in English and French on alternate days. The bulletins were recorded two hours before airing, yet its audience was limited to Port Vila.

Now Television Blong Vanuatu broadcasts in the Chinese Digital TV standard DTMB (Digital Terrestrial Multimedia Broadcast) which is not compatible with any of the DVB-T2 TVs sold in shops and used by the local residents. Customers are required to purchase a Set Top Box from the VBTC in order to see their channels, most of which are Chinese.

Which in turn causes a slow migration to Digital TV. TVs sold in the country are DVB-T2. As this is the main standard used in the Pacific Island region.

Telsat Pacific is a locally owned DVB-T2 UHF Pay TV service that also broadcasts Free-to-Air local channels such as 1NOMO (Project of Telsat Pacific) and KAM TV (Community Akses Media produced by Mark Lowen) which can be received by any Australian or New Zealand standard Digital TV. (www.telsat.vu) The station shut off its analog TV signals on October 15, 2016. The digital service has a capacity for 59 channels. Among the additional channels include TV5MONDE Pacifique, Nouvelle-Calédonie La Première, NHK World Japan and Chinese channels.
