= TBV =

TBV may refer to:

- Traditional Balsamic Vinegar
- Tulip breaking virus
- TBV Lemgo, a German handball club from Lemgo
- TBV Wildenheid, a German association football club
- Team Bahrain Victorious, a cycling team from Bahrain
- Television Blong Vanuatu, a digital service from Vanuatu
- Tekken: Blood Vengeance, a 2011 CG film
