= Carnival in French Guiana =

Annual festival in Guyane

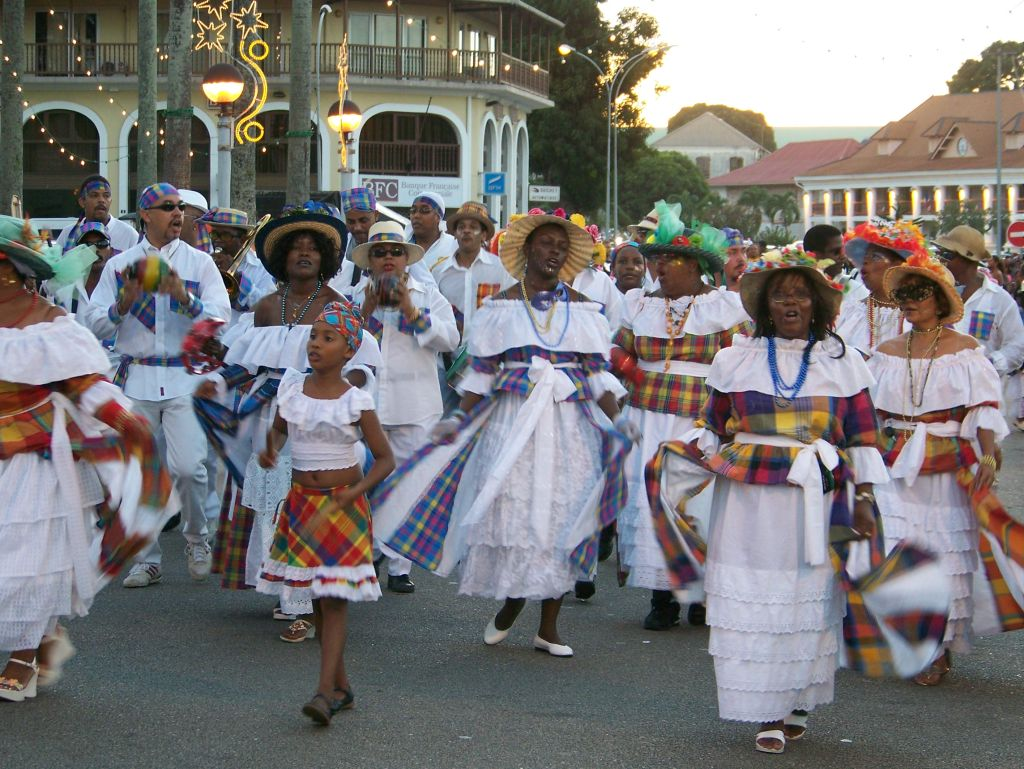
Carnival parade in Cayenne

Carnival in French Guiana is a major event. Its style is described as Afro-Caribbean. A moveable holiday, it takes place between Epiphany and Ash Wednesday, ending on Mardi Gras. Known internationally for its Paré-masqué balls and its emblematic character, the Touloulou, it is considered the longest carnival in the world.

The participants – French, Creole, Brazilian and Chinese people – dress in vibrant costumes. Main events include a parade and a burlesque-style marriage.

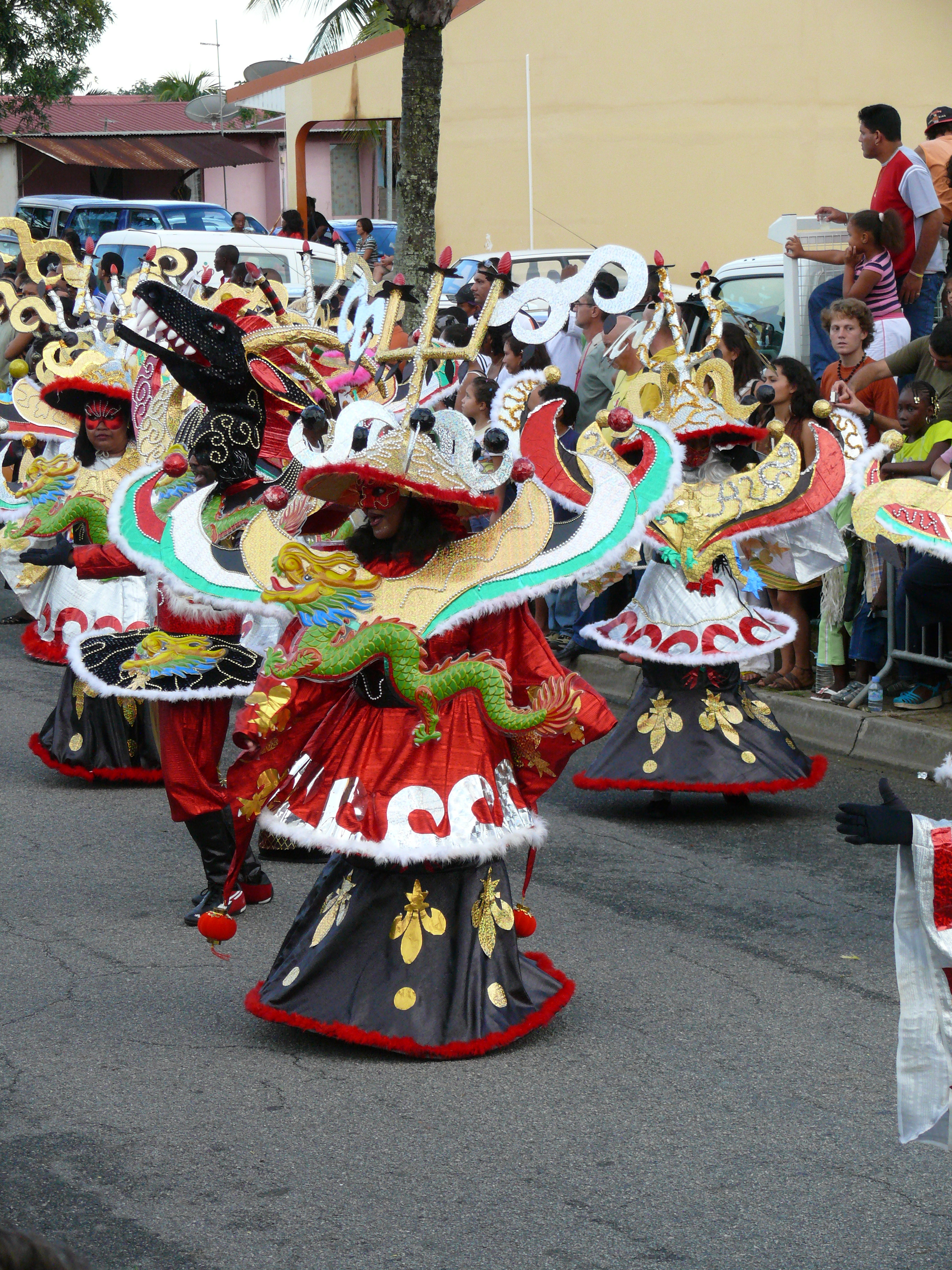
Young Creoles at Kourou's Carnival parade, 2007

== Background ==
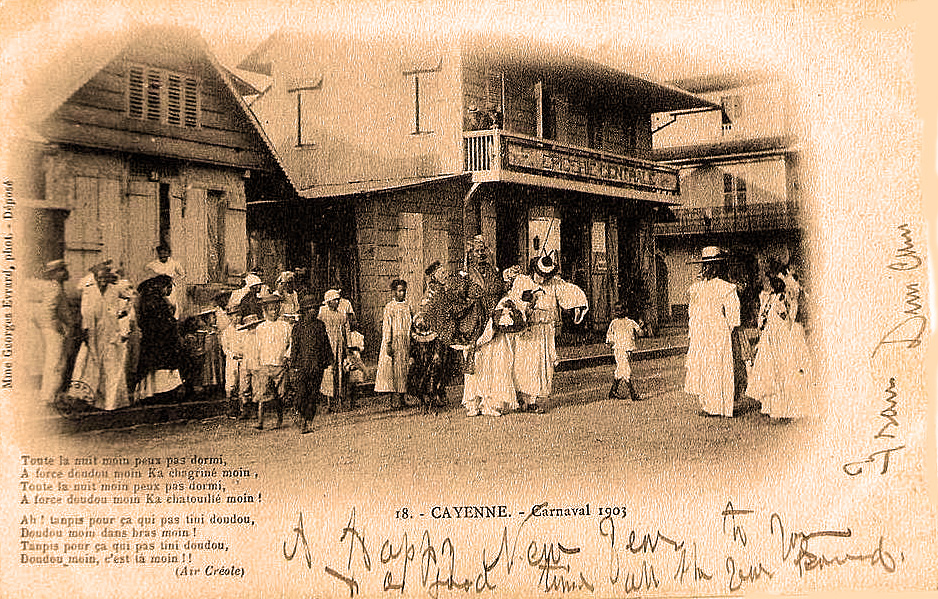
Carnaval in Cayenne, 1903

This celebration is a cultural tradition of the Guianan Creole, its origin traced to carnival customs practiced in Europe. It debuted during the beginning of colonization, between the 1600s and 1700s. When settlers took part in carnival, forbidding the slaves from participating. Defying the ban, the slaves practiced carnival in clandestine ways, seeing it as a way to regain some freedom, to commemorate African fertility, and to deride the settlers. In the present day, metropolitan, Brazilian and Chinese communities take part in the event. Its occurrence varies, prescribed by the religious calendar and taking place between the Epiphany in early January, and Ash Wednesday, which marks the beginning of Lent. Carnival ends on Mardi Gras.

== Traditional costumes ==
There are several traditional costumes in the French Guiana carnival, representing various figures.

=== King Vaval ===
King Vaval is a mythical figure who serves as carnival king. He is introduced at the beginning of the festival and dies on Ash Wednesday, to be reborn like the Phoenix in the following year.

=== Touloulou ===
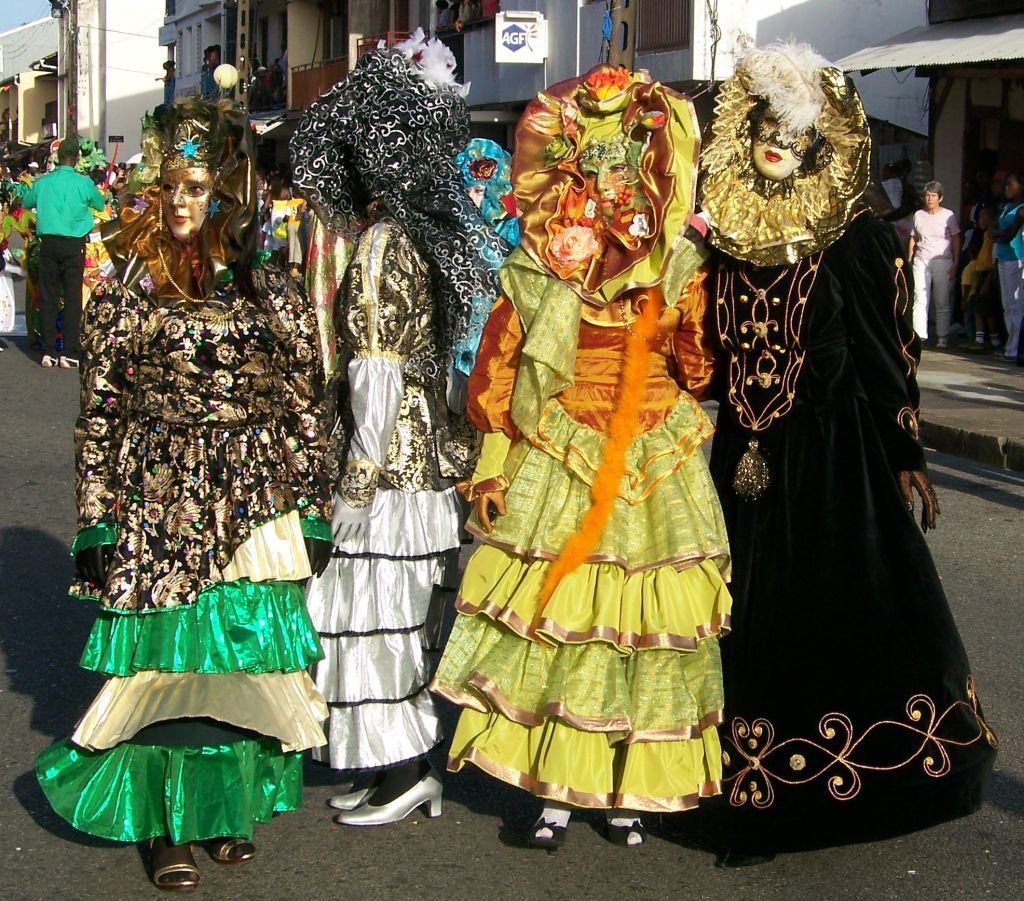
Touloulous

Carnival Queen and most famous character is the Touloulou, an elegantly dressed lady who wears a petticoat, hood, Domino mask, and long gloves, so that none of her skin is visible. The aim of the woman who masquerades as a touloulou is to not be recognized. She strolls down the street and participates in the masked balls. The character represents the bourgeois women of 18th and 19th centuries.

=== Nèg Maron ===
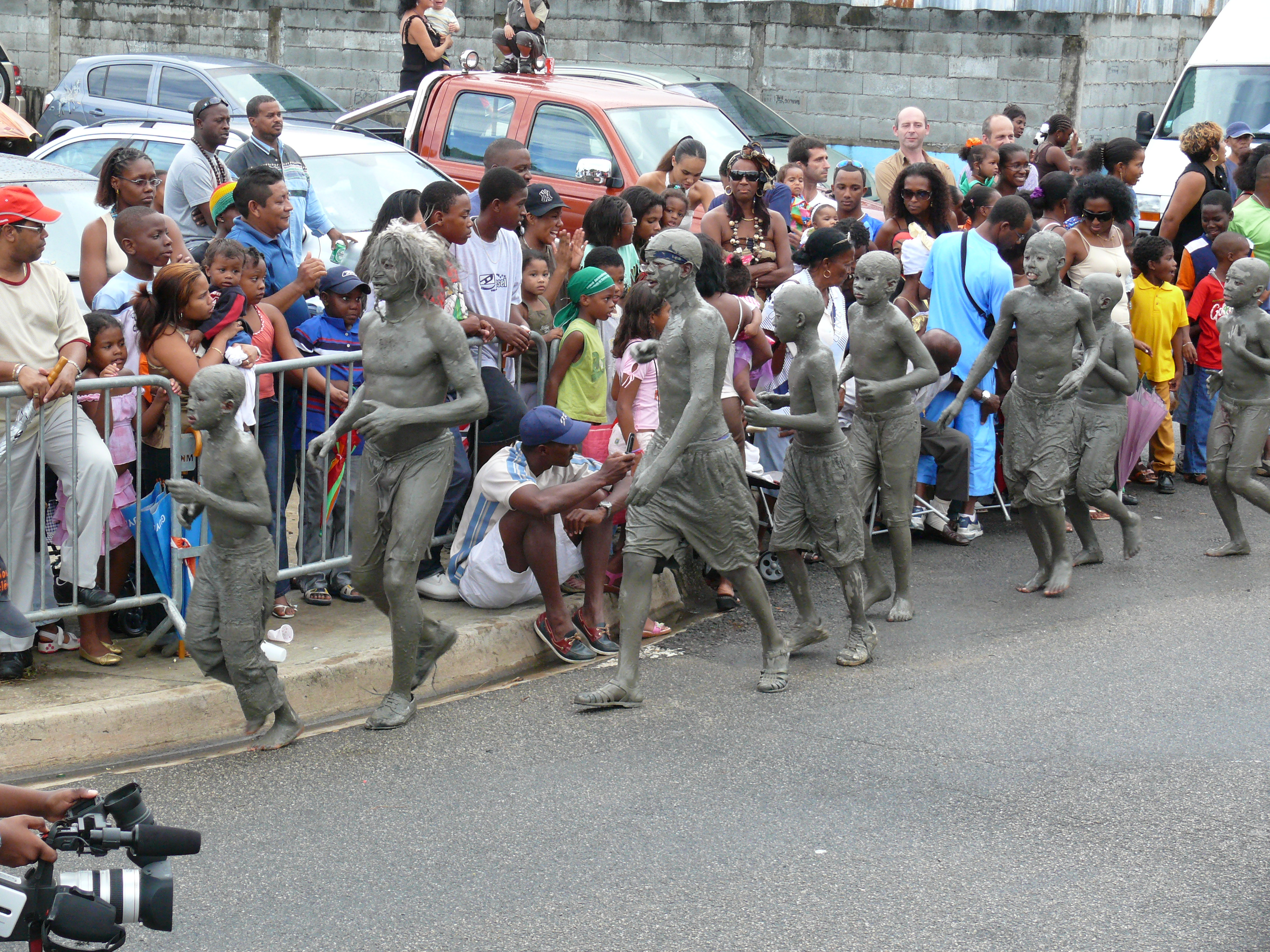
Neg'Marrons

Neg'Marrons are groups of men dressed in kalimbé (red loincloth) and coated with molasses. Representing fugitive slaves, they seek to make order of the festival.

=== Other traditional costumes ===
Other traditional characters include the Zombi baréyé, a zombie character; Jwé farin, who is dressed in white trousers, shirt, pointed hat, and mask, representing a baker; Bobi, is dressed in old potato sacks and appears as a bear led by a leash; Karolin, representing a rich woman with gold who is jealous and protects other women; Lanmò, who represents death, is dressed in white; Soussouris, who represents the bat, is a winged character who commonly wears black or two tones, and is renowned for its vampire behavior; and Diab rouj (red devil), who dresses in red and black. The tululu (mask) is worn in French Guiana while celebrating carnival.

== Events ==
=== Paré-masked ball ===
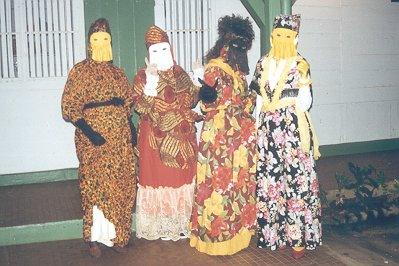
Touloulou in the 1990s

On the Saturday preceding Lent, the Touloulou, carnival Queens, dress in colourful, camouflaged dresses and wear masks while they dance through the streets. Their costumes – lace and petticoats, tights and gloves – cover them from head to toe. They speak in disguised voices to retain anonymity. The women invite the men to join them, which is a mandatory requirement. On Friday and Saturday nights, the Toulouois assemble in large dance halls. Men who are invited have to pay an entry fee.

=== Street parades ===
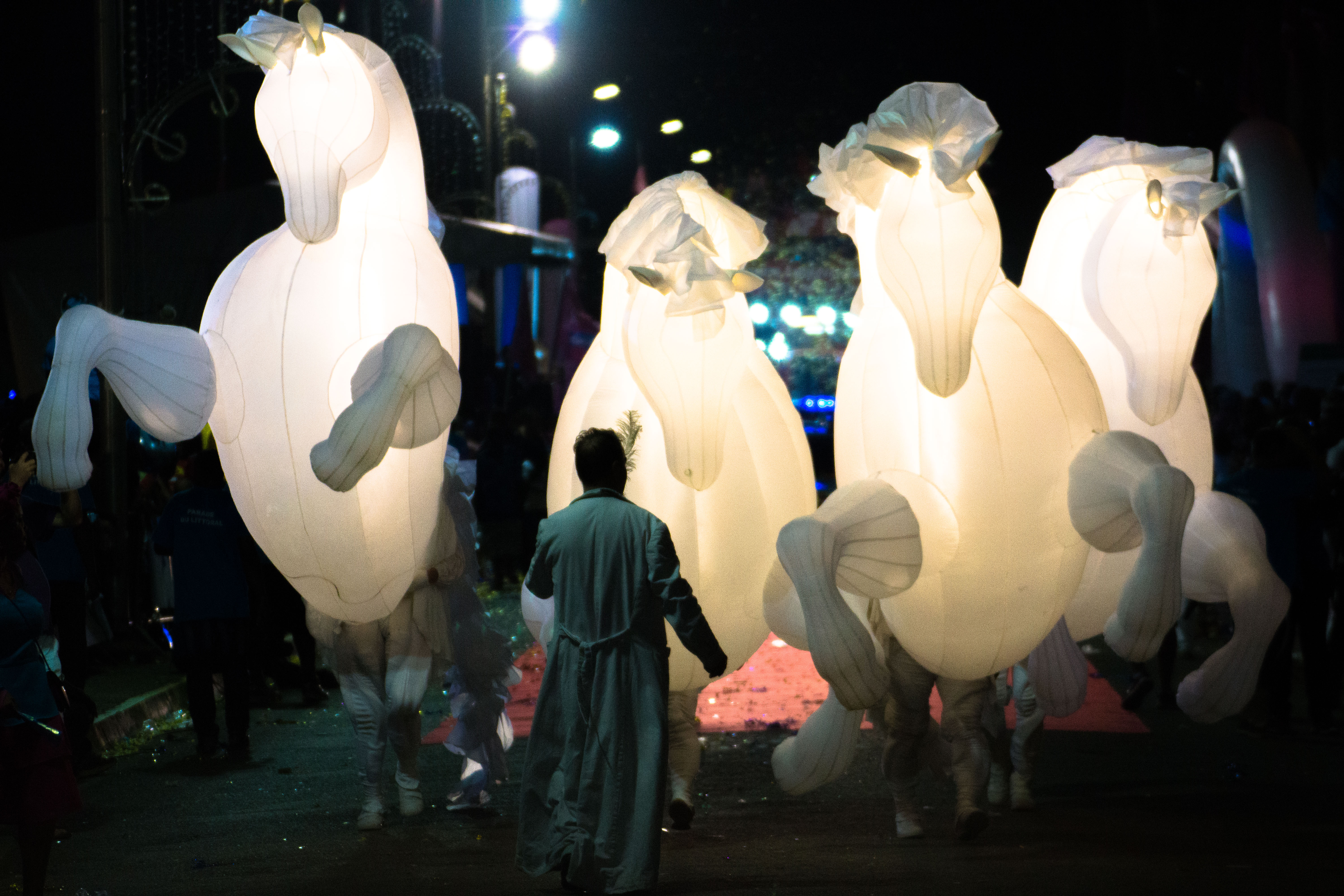
Horses of air and light, great carnival parade, Kourou

Sunday is the day of parades. It require months of preparation. They occur on the streets of Cayenne, Kourou, and Saint-Laurent-du-Maroni. Groups dress according to the theme of the year. The parade includes decorated floats and there are musicians playing drums and brass. Thousands of spectators line the sidewalks and sit in the stands which are set up for the occasion. Brazilian groups have similar costumes to those encountered at Rio Carnival, while the country's Asian community incorporates dragons in the festivities. On Monday, a sham act of marriage with women (brides) in men's gowns and men (grooms) in women's dresses is the main spectacle. Tuesday, the last day of the festival, is marked by the appearance of the main spirit of King Vaval, who is considered by the locals to be "the devil and soul of carnival". He arrives on a canoe in the form of an effigy, made of straw. A very large number of people gather on the beach to welcome him. On this occasion the dancers are dressed in black or red coloured costumes adorned with horns and tails and holding pitchforks. The effigy is then burnt in the night and on the following day, Ash Wednesday, people wear black and white dresses to mourn the passing of Vival.

== Food and drink ==
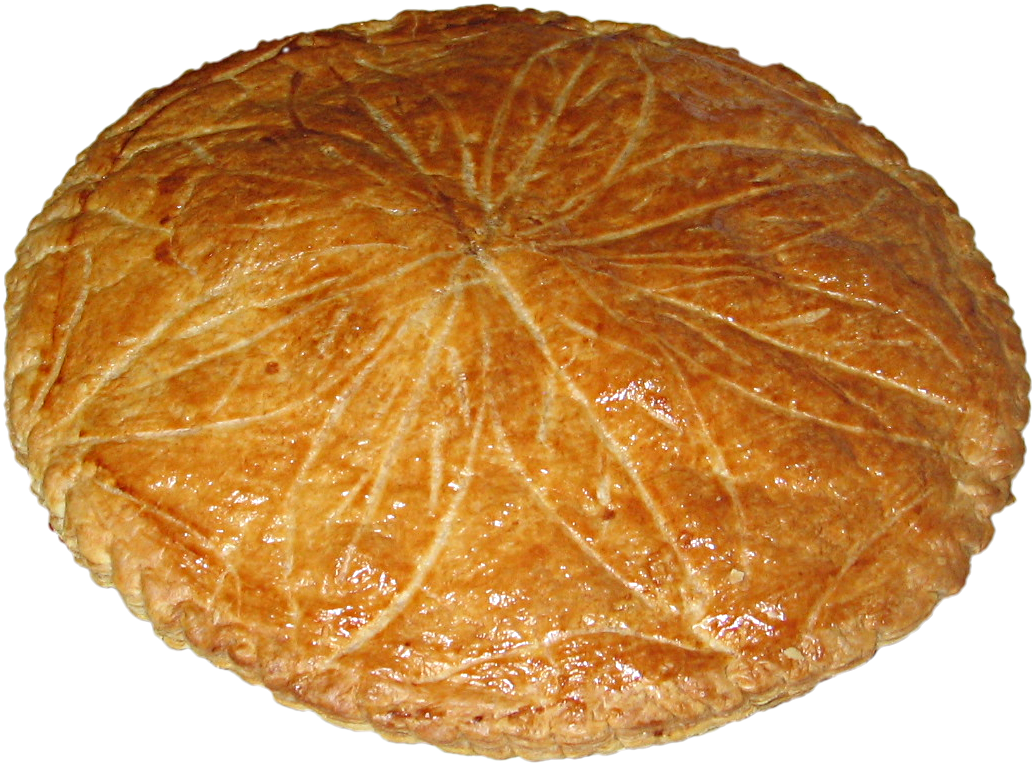
Galette des rois

Fridays commonly include eating a cake, known as the galette des rois (cake of kings, which in mainland France would be eaten only for the Epiphany), representing the Three Kings. This cake has a Creole version, much more popular than the French one. Blaff(fish or chicken broth) and Punch is also commonly consumed during this period.

== Gallery ==
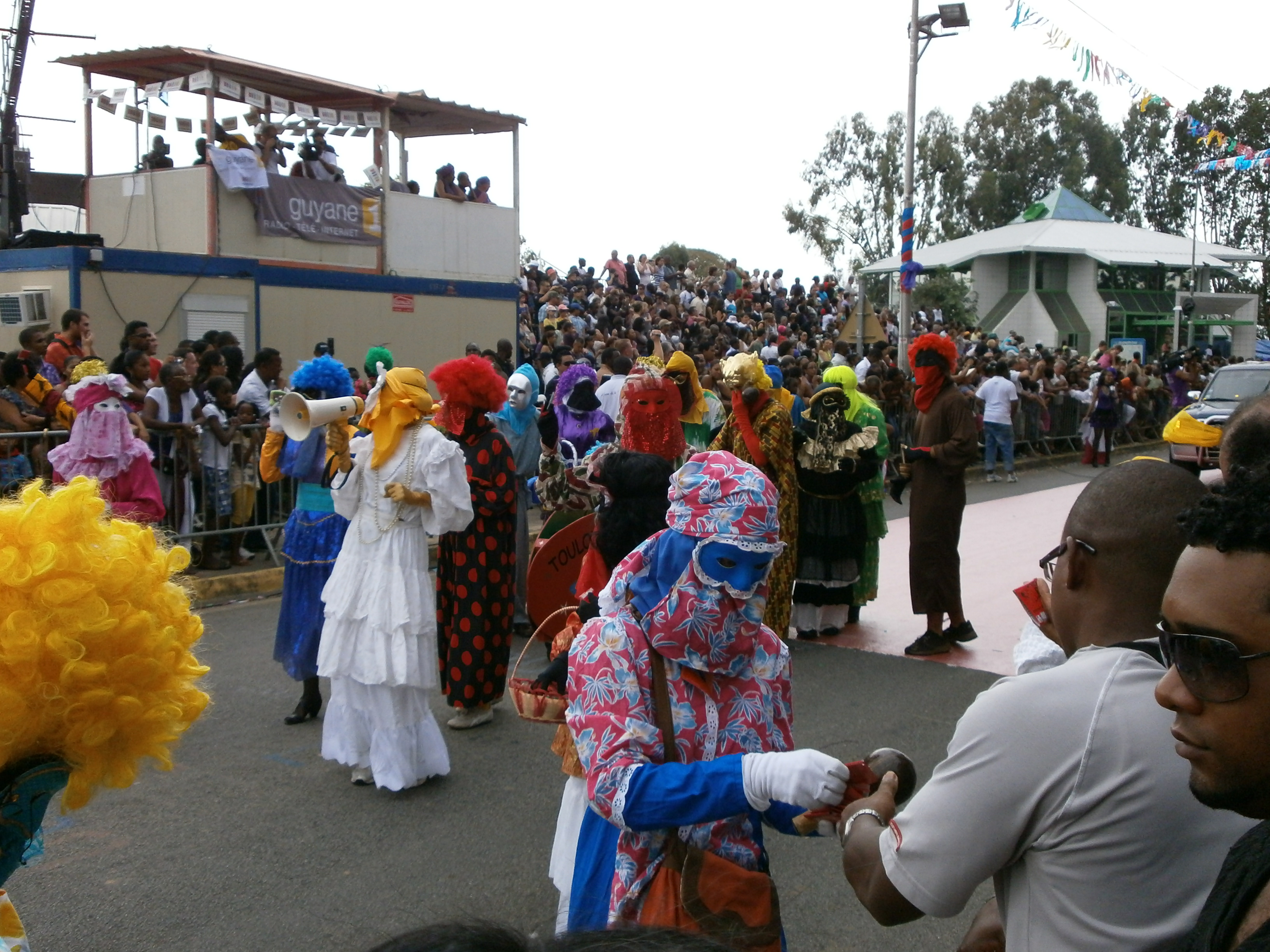
Touloulou parade during the Grande Parade de Kourou

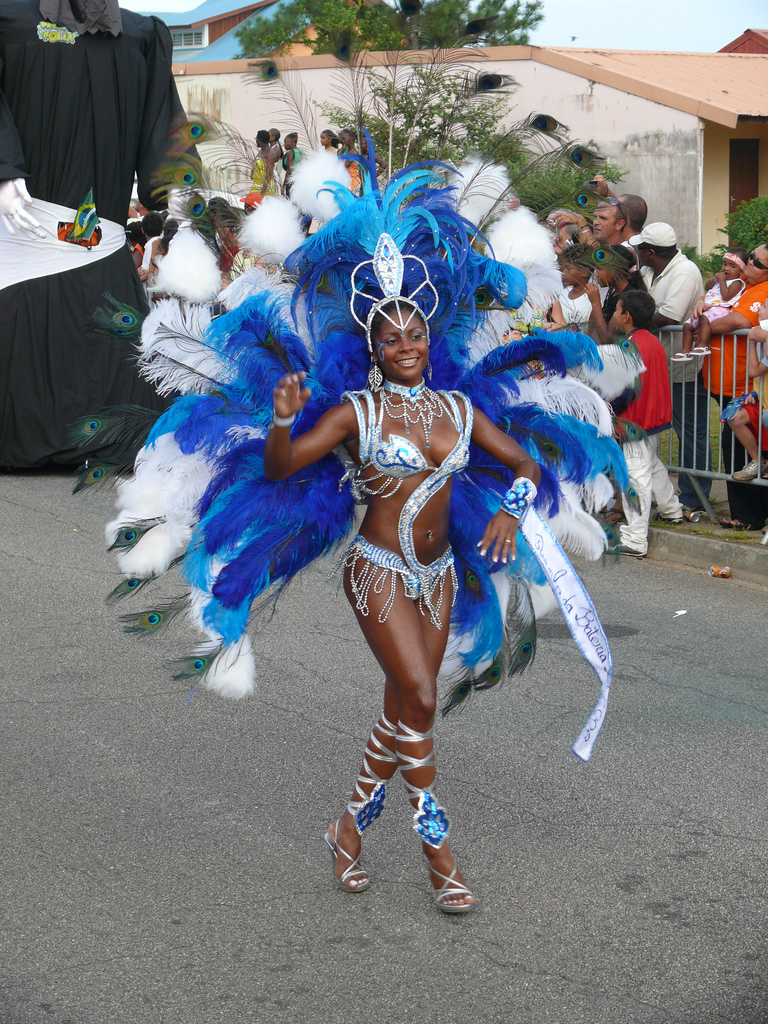
Dancer, Kourou

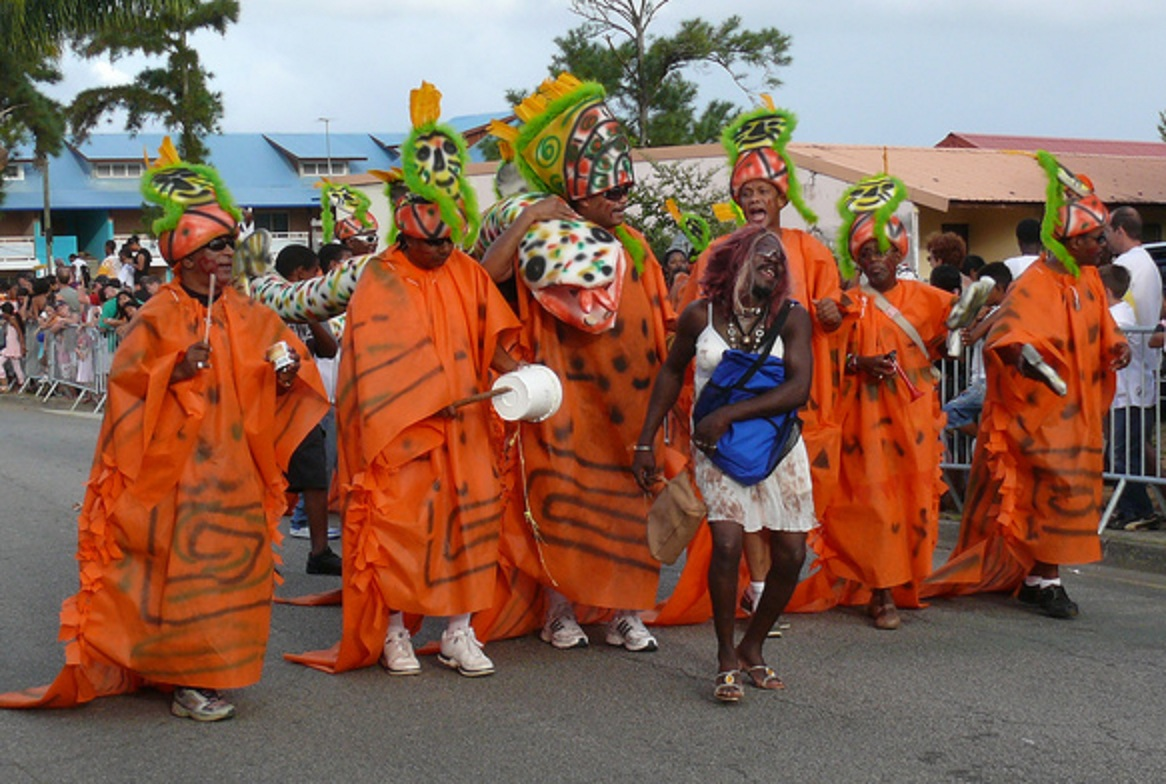
Dancers, Kourou

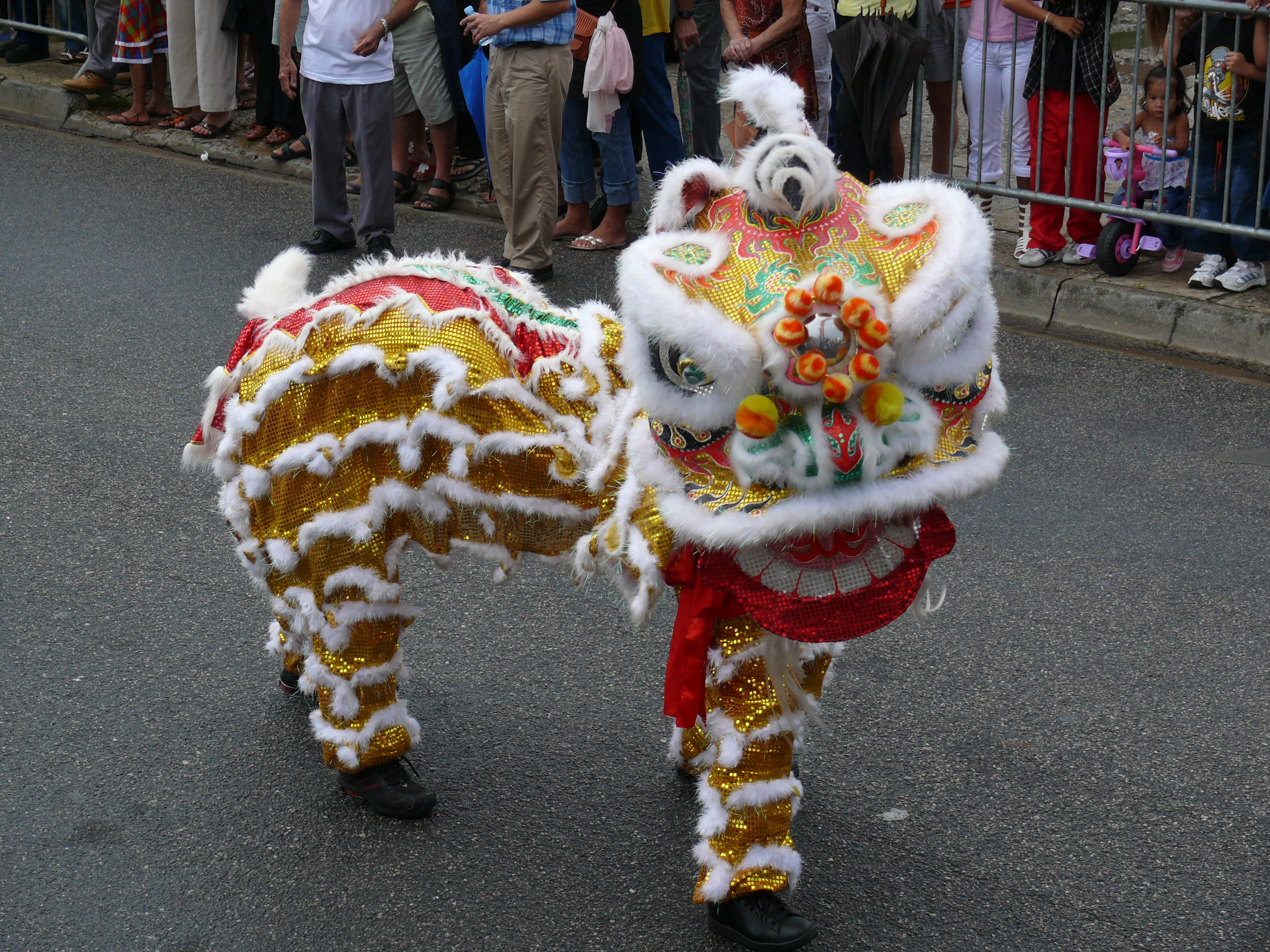
Carnival dragon by the Chinese community

== See also ==
- Carnival of Cayenne

== Bibliography ==
- Albala, Ken (2011). Food Cultures of the World Encyclopedia. ABC-CLIO. ISBN 978-0-313-37626-9.
- Brown, Polly Rodger; Read, James (2003). First-time Latin America. Rough Guides. p. 57. ISBN 978-1-84353-022-0.
- Cheng, Tan Wee (15 August 2011). Exotic Lands and Dodgy Places: Adventures through Greenland, The Amazon and other Far-Out Places. Marshall Cavendish International Asia Pte Ltd. ISBN 978-981-4398-71-8.
- Fauquenoy, Marguerite (1972). Analyse structurale du créole guyanais. Klincksieck. ISBN 9782252011423.
- Gray, Patrick (1 January 1999). Peoples of the Americas: Cuba-FrenchGuiana. Marshall Cavendish. ISBN 978-0-7614-7055-7.
- Horn, David; Laing, Dave (18 April 2005). Continuum Encyclopedia of Popular Music of the World Part 2 Locations (5 Vol Set): Volumes III to VII. Bloomsbury Academic. ISBN 978-0-8264-7436-0.
- Shafto, Daniel (1 January 2009). Carnival. Infobase Publishing. ISBN 978-1-4381-2660-9.
- West, Alan (2003). African Caribbeans: A Reference Guide. Greenwood Publishing Group. ISBN 978-0-313-31240-3.
