= France Ô =

Former French public television channel

- Final logo, used from 2018 until 2020.
- Country: France
- Broadcast area: France
- Headquarters: 3–4, rue Danton; 92299 Malakoff, Hauts-de-Seine

Programming
- Picture format: 1080i HDTV (16:9)

Ownership
- Owner: France Télévisions
- Sister channels: France 2 France 3 France 4 France 5 France Info

History
- Launched: 25 February 2005; 21 years ago
- Replaced: RFO Sat (1998–2005)
- Closed: 24 August 2020; 6 years ago

Availability

Terrestrial
- Digital terrestrial television: Channel 19
- Digital terrestrial television in Overseas France: Channel 6 or 7 or 8

France Ô (pronounced [fʁɑ̃s o]) was a French free-to-air television channel featuring programming from the French overseas departments and collectivities in Metropolitan France. It was part of the France Télévisions group. It was a national counterpart of the local Outre-Mer 1ère networks.

== History ==
The channel was launched in 1998 as RFO Sat by Jean-Marie Cavada, then-president of Réseau France Outre-mer (RFO), and initially broadcast for only 9 hours per day. On 28 May, TPS started carrying the channel. It was re-branded as France Ô on 25 February 2005 after the reunification of RFO with France Télévisions. The "O" stands for Outre-mer (overseas); the circumflex, which is considered an accent in French grammar, was used to emphasize that the channel was open to diverse accents and dialects, as well as to ensure that the name was not read as France 0 ("France zero"). Simultaneously, the channel increased from a nine-hour operation to 24 hours a day.

The channel became available in overseas territories in November 2010, replacing the RFO-operated Tempo, and was launched on DTT nationally the same year.

== Closure ==
In July 2018 the French government announced the closure of France Ô due to declining viewership. The ceasing of broadcast was scheduled for 9 August 2020, in time for the closing ceremony of the 2020 Summer Olympics, but was later pushed to 24 August due to scheduling issues caused by the COVID-19 pandemic, which resulted in the games being delayed to 2021. The last programme broadcast on the channel was a repeat of the concert L'Outre-mer fait son Olympia 2019. After this, the channel only broadcast a loop of commercials promoting a new France Télévisions portal for overseas territories, known as "Portail des Outre-mer La 1ère", in addition to other overseas-themed programs on other France Télévisions channels. Its signal was permanently cut off on 2 September.

== Logos ==
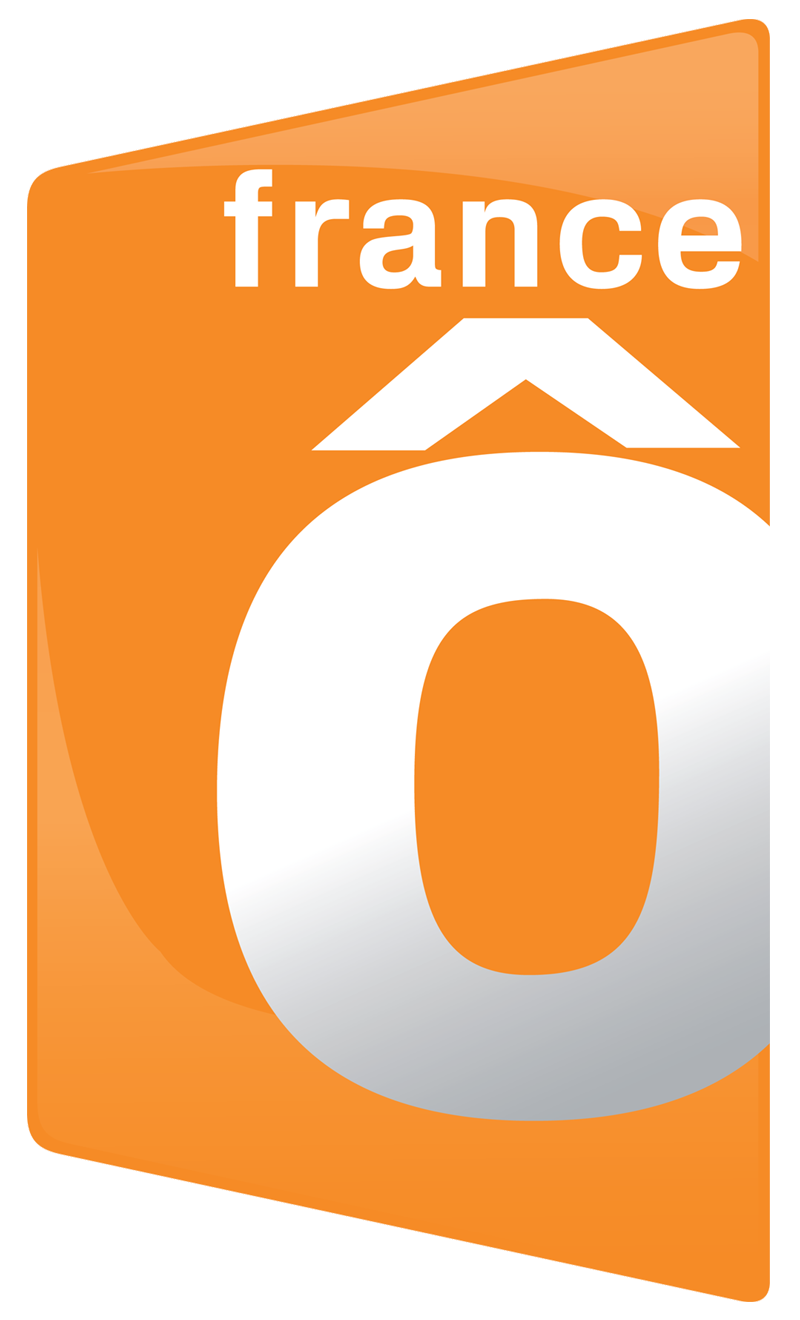
Logo of France Ô from 7 April 2008 till 29 January 2018.

Logo of France Ô from 29 January 2018 till 24 August 2020.

On-screen logo of France Ô from 29 January 2018 till 24 August 2020.

== See also ==
- Tempo (RFO)
