= Nouvelle-Calédonie La Première =

- Country: New Caledonia, France
- Network: La Première
- Headquarters: Nouméa, New Caledonia

Programming
- Language: French
- Picture format: 576i SDTV

Ownership
- Owner: France Télévisions

History
- Launched: 19 October 1965; 60 years ago
- Former names: ORTF Télé Nouméa (1967–1975); FR3-Nouvelle-Calédonie (1975–1982); RFO Nouvelle-Calédonie (1983–1988); RFO 1 Nouvelle-Calédonie (1988–1999); Télé Nouvelle-Calédonie (1999–2010); Nouvelle-Calédonie 1^{re} (2010–2018)

Links
- Website: la1ere.francetvinfo.fr/nouvellecaledonie/

Availability

Terrestrial
- TNT: Channel 1

Nouvelle-Calédonie La Première (French pronunciation: [nuvɛl kaledɔni la pʁəmjɛʁ], lit. 'New Caledonia the First'), is a French overseas departmental free-to-air television channel available in the collectivity of New Caledonia. It is operated by the overseas unit of France Télévisions.

== History ==
Télé Nouméa was born from General de Gaulle's desire to install television, during 1965, in Nouméa and Tahiti in view of the presidential elections of December 1965 in order to compensate for the impact of nuclear tests in the Pacific. Georges Pompidou, then Prime Minister, announced the good news sixteen months earlier in a speech. This strong political will explains why it only took the ORTF eight months. to build the building intended to house the station on Mont Coffyn above Nouméa, bring in, assemble and install the first three pylons of the network, recruit the teams then install and decorate the studio. The station operated on channel 6.

On October 19, 1965, at 6:30 p.m., the High Commissioner of the Republic, Jean Risterucci, kicked off the first program broadcast in the territory which was inaugurated by Alain Peyrefitte, Minister of Information. His speech was followed by that of the High Commissioner, the children's program Bonne nuit les petits, then the first television news bulletin from Télé Nouméa followed by a 1948 film, Ruy Blas, until around 9 p.m. when the channel shut down for the night. For a long time, the broadcasts only lasted two and a half to three hours per day with priority given to local information which occupies a good place in the television news, although reports from Métropole are also broadcast there, sometimes a little late on the event reported because they are sent from Paris by plane once a week. The news primarily concerns Greater Nouméa and the Brousse, but the appointment of Marie-Thérèse Guinchard as editor-in-chief in 1965 and the visit of General de Gaulle in 1966 gave new impetus to this meeting. Films are also delivered by air and the delay in their arrival sometimes has unfortunate consequences on programming. Around these new programs appeared the first announcers like Marie-Claire Rothut, Marie-Claude Stuart, Sonia Boyer, today vice-president of the South Province, or even Marie-France Cubadda, who later became a journalist for the channel. Several weeks before the station opened, Télé-Noumea faced shadow competition from television stations in Rockhampton and Sydney, which were received with ordinary aerials.

Télé Nouméa is a great success with viewers to such an extent that the O.R.T.F. decided to extend broadcast coverage outside Nouméa by installing a new transmitter at Mont Do, entirely transported by the army, which had to trace an access route and mount the equipment on the backs of men. Retransmitters were then installed in 1966 at Ouen-Toro and at Sémaphore then towards the North, the East coast and on the heights of Grande Terre, in order to allow all Caledonians to receive television.

Following the breakup of the O.R.T.F. On December 31, 1974, the regional television stations of French overseas territories were integrated into the new national program company France Régions 3 (FR3), the new French regional channel, within the FR3 DOM-TOM delegation. The channel became FR3-Nouvelle-Calédonie on January 6, 1975, and, like each metropolitan regional station, produces and broadcasts a regional television news program, but is also responsible for ensuring territorial continuity in terms of audiovisual media by broadcasting programs from the channels metropolitan television stations and switches to color. In 1978 the channel broadcast for the first time by satellite and live the Football World Cup taking place in Argentina. Television advertising was authorized in 1975. At the end of the year, FR3 was studying plans to implement television to the Loyalty Islands.

In 1983, the channel took the name RFO Nouvelle-Calédonie following the creation of the national program company RFO (Société de Radiodiffusion et de Télévision Française pour l'Outre-mer) by transfer of the activities of FR3 for overseas. Its missions remain unchanged but it is also asked to produce programs. Over the next fourteen years, RFO Nouvelle-Calédonie will gradually acquire quality technical equipment in order to produce and broadcast more and more regional programs. Decentralized branches are created in Koné and Lifou for this purpose. When a second television channel, RFO 2, was launched in April 1988, it was renamed RFO 1.

On February 1, 1999, RFO Nouvelle-Calédonie became Télé Nouvelle-Calédonie (also referred to by the acronym TNC), following the transformation of RFO into Réseau France Outre-mer.

Since July 9, 2004, Télé Nouvelle-Calédonie has belonged to France Télévisions SA, a single national company into which RFO has become a subsidiary of the single company France Télévisions SA.

The audiovisual reform law no. 2004-669 of July 9, 2004 integrates the program company Réseau France Outre-mer into the public audiovisual group France Télévisions on which Télé Nouvelle-Calédonie has since depended. Its president, Rémy Pflimlin, announces the change of name from Réseau France Outre-mer to Réseau Outre-Mer 1re to adapt to the launch of DTT in the French overseas regions. All of the network's television channels changed their name on November 30, 2010, when TNT started and Télé Nouvelle-Calédonie thus became Nouvelle-Calédonie 1re. The name change refers to the leading position of this channel in its broadcast territory as well as its first place on the remote control and its numbering in line with the other channels of the France Télévisions group.

From 2013, the channel is commonly called NC1ère which becomes the official name of the Caledonian channel. It was made available on digital terrestrial television in Vanuatu in August 2016, when the Vanuatu Broadcasting and Television Corporation initiated its own platform. On January 1, 2018, following a lawsuit with the cable channel Paris Première, NC1ère became Nouvelle-Calédonie La 1ère (or NC La 1ère for short).

New Caledonia La 1re started high definition broadcasts on January 12, 2022, on TNT and satellite. New Caledonia was one of the last stations to do the conversion.
