= Martinique La Première =

- Country: Martinique, France
- Network: La Première
- Headquarters: Fort-de-France, Martinique

Programming
- Language: French
- Picture format: 576i SDTV

Ownership
- Owner: France Télévisions

History
- Launched: 12 July 1964; 62 years ago
- Former names: ORTF Télé Martinique (1967–1975); FR3-Martinique (1975–1982); RFO Martinique (1983–1988); RFO 1 Martinique (1988–1999); Télé Martinique(1999–2010); Martinique 1^{re} (2010–2018)

Links
- Website: la1ere.francetvinfo.fr/martinique/

Availability

Terrestrial
- TNT: Channel 1

Martinique La Première (French pronunciation: [maʁtinik la pʁəmjɛʁ], lit. 'Martinique the First'), is a French overseas departmental free-to-air television channel available in the department of Martinique. It is operated by the overseas unit of France Télévisions and broadcasts in French and the local creole.

== History ==
Télé Martinique started broadcasting on 12 July 1964, from a main transmitter on VHF channel 4, and supplementary relay stations at La Trinité (channel 6), Morne Aca (channel 7) and Morne Folie (channel 6). On 21 December 1964, the first locally-produced news bulletin aired. Journalist Luc Laventure started working at the station in 1967; he left in 1981.

Following the breakup of the O.R.T.F. on 31 December 1974, the regional television stations of French overseas territories were integrated into the new national program company France Régions 3 (FR3), the new French regional channel, within the FR3 DOM-TOM delegation. The channel became FR3-Martinique on January 6, 1975, and, like each metropolitan regional station, produces and broadcasts a regional television news program, but is also responsible for ensuring territorial continuity in terms of audiovisual media by broadcasting programs from the metropolitan television channels.

In 1983, the channel took the name RFO Martinique following the creation of the national program company RFO (Société de Radiodiffusion et de Télévision Française pour l'Outre-mer) by transfer of the activities of FR3 for overseas territories and dependencies. Its missions remain unchanged but it is also asked to produce programs. Its facilities were the target of a terrorist attack from Martinican separatists on 28 April 1988, precisely timed with a visit of French president François Mitterrand to the island. On 1 September 1993, its staff went on an indefinite strike.

On 1 February 1999, RFO Martinique became Télé Martinique, following the transformation of RFO into Réseau France Outre-mer.

Since 9 July 2004, Télé Martinique has belonged to France Télévisions SA, a single national company into which RFO has become a subsidiary of the single company France Télévisions SA. ts president, Rémy Pflimlin, announced the change of name from Réseau France Outre-mer to Réseau Outre-Mer 1re to adapt to the launch of DTT in the French overseas regions in 2010; the name change took place on 30 November 2010, when TNT started and Télé Martinique thus became Martinique 1re. The name change refers to the leading position of this channel in its broadcast territory as well as its first place on the remote control and its numbering in line with the other channels of the France Télévisions group. On 1 January 2018, following a lawsuit with the cable channel Paris Première, Martinique 1ère became Martinique La 1ère.
