= Wallis-et-Futuna La Première =

- Country: Wallis and Futuna, France
- Network: La Première
- Headquarters: Mata Utu

Programming
- Language(s): French, Wallisian and Futunan
- Picture format: 576i SDTV

Ownership
- Owner: France Télévisions

History
- Launched: 1986; 39 years ago
- Former names: RFO Wallis-et-Futuna (1986–1999); Télé Wallis-et-Futuna (1999–2010); Wallis-et-Futuna 1^{re} (2010–2018)

Links
- Website: la1ere.francetvinfo.fr/wallisfutuna/

Availability

Terrestrial
- TNT: Channel 1

Wallis-et-Futuna La Première lit. 'Wallis and Futuna the First'), is a French overseas free-to-air television channel available in the collectivity of Wallis and Futuna. It is operated by the overseas unit of France Télévisions and is the only local television station.

== History ==
As of 1985, Wallis and Futuna, alongside Mayotte, only had radio. RFO started television broadcasts to Wallis and Futuna in 1986, but only for Wallis. In August 1989, broadcast of a satellite-fed news bulletin produced by the main RFO facilities in Paris began airing in August 1989. The first television news bulletin aired on 9 August 1990, presented by Lusia Kavakava. It wasn't until Christmas 1994 when RFO started delivering the service to Futuna. On 24 December 1994 (Christmas Eve) at 1pm, television signals on the island were switched on. To mark the arrival, the station's year-end festivities were broadcast from Futuna. At the time, the station operated a daily schedule from seven to ten hours. The station was plagued by a strike in November 1998, which caused it to operate on self-management status.

The audiovisual reform law no. 2004-669 of July 9, 2004 integrates the program company Réseau France Outre-mer into the public audiovisual group France Télévisions on which Télé Wallis-et-Futuna has since depended. Its president, Rémy Pflimlin, announces the change of name from Réseau France Outre-mer to Réseau Outre-Mer 1re to adapt to the launch of DTT in the French overseas regions. All of the network's television channels changed their name on November 30, 2010, when TNT started and Télé Wallis-et-Futuna became Wallis-et-Futuna 1re. The name change refers to the leading position of this channel in its broadcast territory as well as its first place on the remote control and its numbering in line with the other channels of the France Télévisions group.

On 16 January 2022, Wallis-et-Futuna La Première started broadcasting in high definition, in line with the completion of the conversion of all overseas stations to the format.
