= Guyane La Première (television) =

- Country: French Guiana, France
- Network: La Première
- Headquarters: Cayenne, French Guiana

Programming
- Language(s): French; Guianese Creole
- Picture format: 576i SDTV

Ownership
- Owner: France Télévisions

History
- Launched: 13 January 1967; 58 years ago
- Former names: ORTF Télé Guyane (1967–1975); FR3-Guyane (1975–1982); RFO Guyane (1983–1988); RFO 1 Guyane (1988–1999); Télé Guyane (1999–2010); Guyane 1^{re} (2010–2018)

Links
- Website: la1ere.francetvinfo.fr/guyane/

Availability

Terrestrial
- TNT: Channel 1

Guyane La Première (French pronunciation: [ɡɥijan la pʁəmjɛʁ], lit. '(French) Guiana the First'), is a French overseas departmental free-to-air television channel that broadcasts from Remire-Montjoly. The channel can be seen throughout French Guiana. It is operated by the overseas unit of France Télévisions.

== History ==
The station began broadcasting on January 13, 1967, as Télé-Guyane, broadcasting on VHF channel 4 in Cayenne with a relay station on channel 6 in Kourou. From its beginnings, it was part of the ORTF network until its dissolution in 1974.

In 1975, ORTF's overseas channels (including French Guiana) became part of the overseas division of the France Régions 3 network, changing its name to "FR3-Guyane"; while in 1982 the stations became part of the Société de Radiodiffusion et de télévision Française pour l'Outre-mer (RFO).

On January 1, 1999, after the reconversion of the RFO into "Réseau France Outre-mer", the French Guiana signal once again used the name "Telé-Guyane".

On July 9, 2004, with Law 2004-669 on Broadcasting Reform, the Réseau France Outre-mer media were integrated into the public company France Télévisions.

On November 30, 2010, the channel began broadcasting on digital terrestrial television through Channel 1. In addition, as a consequence of the name change of the overseas channel to "Réseau Outre-Mer 1ere", it also changed its name to "Guyane 1ere", which would change again to "Guyane La Première" as of January 1, 2018 after a judicial agreement between France Télévisions and Groupe M6.

On November 29, 2011, the channel stopped broadcasting in analog format, starting to broadcast on Air only in digital format.

On January 15, 2020, Guyane La Première began broadcasting its programming in HD through satellite TV systems.

== Programming ==
Much of its programming consists of broadcasting the contents of La Première, which is the public Radio and Television network for the overseas territories of France. In addition, the channel also has local programming, among which the news programs Midi Guyane and Guyane Soir stand out.

== Transmitters ==
Guyane La Première is broadcast in 17 communes through 19 transmitters, reaching 87% of the population in French Guiana.

Coverage area	Name of the location	Frequency
Apatou	Réservoir Communal	25
Camopi	Bourg	25
Cayena	Ilet La Mère	33
Cayena	Montagne Du Tigre	33
Grand-Santi	Réservoir Communal	25
Iracoubo	Crique Moucaya	32
Kourou	Pariacabo	41
Mana	Village	40
Maripasoula	Réservoir Communale	25
Matoury	Rochambeau	31
Ouanary	Mont d'Observatoire	46
Papaïchton	Le Maroni	26
Régina	Montagne De Kaw	41
Régina	Village	41
Roura	Cacao	32
Saül	Village	25
Sinnamary	Corossony	31
Saint-Georges-de-l'Oyapock	Réservoir	25
Saint-Laurent-du-Maroni	Ville	24
