= Tempo (RFO) =

- Country: France
- Broadcast area: France

Programming
- Picture format: 1080i HDTV (16:9)

Ownership
- Owner: France Télévisions
- Sister channels: RFO 1

History
- Launched: 1983; 43 years ago
- Replaced: RFO 2 (1983–1998)
- Closed: 29 November 2010; 15 years ago

Tempo was a French terrestrial television channel available in overseas dependencies and territories. It aired programmes from France Télévisions' channels. It was set up between 1983 and 1988 in seven RFO centres (all but Mayotte and Wallis and Futuna) initially to deliver packages of Antenne 2 programming, before adopting an identity of its own in 1998 as Tempo, airing more educational and cultural programmes.

The arrival of digital terrestrial television in the French overseas led to the closure of the channel in 2010.

== History ==
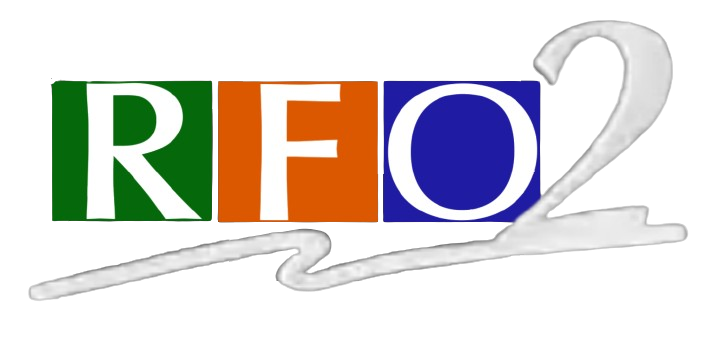
RFO 2 Logo (1990–1994)

Between 1983 and 1988, Réseau France Outre-mer (RFO) rolled out a second television channel in Martinique, Guadeloupe, French Guyana, Reunion, Saint Pierre and Miquelon, New Caledonia and French Polynesia. It is known that by 1984, French Polynesia already received the second channel, known as either RFO 2 or RFO Canal 2. The purpose of the new service was to provide a selection of programmes seen on Antenne 2 in the French mainland.

In April 1988, the channel officially became RFO 2 and was reserved only for programming packages from Antenne 2, displacing TF1's programmes to RFO 1. At the same time, the time-shifted broadcasts of Antenne 2's news bulletin on the RFO 2 network caused concern from locals due to timezone differences and fears that the news seen would become outdated within hours. The affair reached Prime Minister Jacques Chirac.

By the mid-1990s, programmes from France 3, La Cinquième/France 5 and later Arte joined its offer, while commercial advertising was withdrawn. The channel was renamed Tempo in 1998; on 29 November 2010, the channel shut down with the arrival of digital terrestrial television to the French overseas the following day, which implied free-to-air access to France 2, France 3, France 4, France 5, France Ô, France 24 and Arte in all of the territories, including Mayotte and Wallis and Futuna. In Réunion, the shutdown took place at 1pm and was broadcast on the main channel, with France Télévisions president Rémy Pflimlin shutting down in its control room.

== See also ==
- Réseau France Outre-mer (RFO)
- France Ô
