= La Première (French TV network) =

Television network in French overseas departments and territories

- Country: France
- Headquarters: 3–4, rue Danton; 92299 Malakoff, Hauts-de-Seine

Programming
- Picture format: 1080i HDTV (downscaled to 576i for the SD feed)

Ownership
- Owner: France Télévisions
- Sister channels: Tempo (1983–2010); RFO Sat (1998–2005); France Ô (2005–2020)

History
- Launched: 8 June 1954; 72 years ago
- Former names: RFOM (1954); SORAFOM (1955–1964); OCORA (1964–1975); FR3 DOM-TOM (1975–1982); Société de Radiodiffusion et de télévision Française pour l'Outre-mer (1982–1998); Réseau France Outre-mer (RFO) (1998–2010); Réseau Outre-Mer Première (2010–2018)

Links
- Website: la1ere.franceinfo.fr

Availability

Terrestrial
- TNT: La Première: Channel 1

La Première (French pronunciation: [la pʁəmjɛʁ]) (often abbreviated Outre-mer La 1re or simply La 1re) is a group of French radio and television stations operated by the state-owned France Télévisions group. The stations operate in France's overseas departments and territories, carrying news, cultural, and regional language programming.

== History ==
Logo of La 1ère from 2005 to 2008

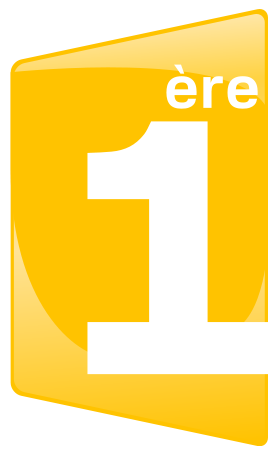
Former logo (2010)

The service was first established in 1954 as the Radiodiffusion de la France Outre-Mer (RFOM). It was renamed a year later as the Société de radiodiffusion de la France d'outre-mer (SORAFOM).

This was replaced in 1964, following the creation of the Office de Radiodiffusion Télévision Française, by the Office de coopération radiophonique (OCORA).

In August 1974, OCORA became a part of the reformulated FR3: a network of regional television stations in mainland France. FR3's overseas operations were known as FR3 DOM-TOM and, unlike the arrangement in metropolitan France, were in charge of both television and radio.

In December 1982, France's overseas broadcasting operations were removed from FR3 and invested in the current organization, the Société de Radiodiffusion et de télévision Française pour l'Outre-mer (RFO).

In July 2004, Réseau France Outre-mer (RFO) was reunited with the French mainland's public broadcasters when it was merged into the France Télévisions network.

On 30 November 2010, Réseau France Outre-mer was renamed Réseau Outre-Mer 1ère. In 2018, the name was changed to La Première, prefixed with the region name, to resolve a trademark concern from Groupe M6 over possible confusion with its channel Paris Première.

On 15 January 2020, France Télévisions channels and Arte switched to high definition (HD) on satellite in overseas territories (except in New Caledonia and Wallis and Futuna). Starting in September 2020, and following the release of frequencies operated by France Ô after its shutdown in August 2020, channels from the network can switch to HD on digital terrestrial television (DTT). Since January 2022, all television services from the network have been broadcast in HD on DTT and satellite.

In January 2024, Outre-mer La Première was chosen by the Regulatory Authority for Audiovisual and Digital Communication to be the operator of the ROMU overseas DTT multiplex, broadcasting France 2 in ultra-high-definition quality.

== Services ==
Current logo as of 2018

La Première consists of nine radio and television services serving eleven regions, departments or communities of Overseas France. The channels carry programmes that reflect the needs of the regions, including news bulletins and programmes reflective of the region's culture and history. These include regional language programming where applicable.

The network also operates Radio Outre-mer La Première as a national internet radio station, which carries a mix of music and programmes from all of the La Première stations. France Télévisions previously operated an equivalent national television channel, France Ô, but it was closed in 2020 due to declining viewership, and replaced by a digital platform.

La Première radio is available only in overseas territories/departments and on the Internet via the website la1ere.fr. The content changes depending on what radio station one is listening to online or depending on where they live in the overseas territories/departments just like France 3 does with the regional news bulletins such as 12/13, Soir 3 or other regional shows. It also offers free streaming online for radio and TV. The television broadcast on the website is only for those who live in the overseas territories/departments.

The territory of French Southern and Antarctic Lands (TAAF) does not have a dedicated station as the population is transient and non-indigenous. Broadcasts, stories and breaking news concerning TAAF would be handled by Réunion La Première as they arise as oversight of TAAF is headquartered in the Réunionnaise commune of Saint Pierre. The other territory without a station, Clipperton Island, also has no permanent population and is actually private property of the French government.

Local generalist television and radio stations
Department or collectivity	Radio		Television	
Department or collectivity	Station	Creation date	Channel	Creation date
French Guiana	Guyane La Première (French and French Guianese Creole)	9 June 1951	Guyane La Première (French and French Guianese Creole)	13 January 1967
French Polynesia	Polynésie La Première (French and Tahitian)	1949	Polynésie La Première (French and Tahitian)	3 October 1965
Guadeloupe Saint Barthélemy Saint Martin	Guadeloupe La Première (French and Antillean Creole)	1937	Guadeloupe La Première (French and Antillean Creole)	22 December 1964
Martinique	Martinique La Première (French and Martinique Creole)	22 October 1937	Martinique La Première (French and Martinique Creole)	12 July 1964
Mayotte	Mayotte La Première (French and Mahorais)	February 1961	Mayotte La Première (French and Mahorais)	21 December 1986
New Caledonia	Nouvelle-Calédonie La Première (French)	3 June 1937	Nouvelle-Calédonie La Première (French)	19 October 1965
Réunion	Réunion La Première (French and Réunion Creole)	1929	Réunion La Première (French and Réunion Creole)	24 December 1964
Saint Pierre and Miquelon	Saint-Pierre and Miquelon La Première (French)	1930	Saint Pierre and Miquelon La Première (French)	20 April 1967
Wallis and Futuna	Wallis and Futuna La Première (French, Wallisian, and Futunien)	21 April 1979	Wallis and Futuna La Première (French, Wallisian, and Futunien)	1986
