= Touloulou =

Guianan carnival character

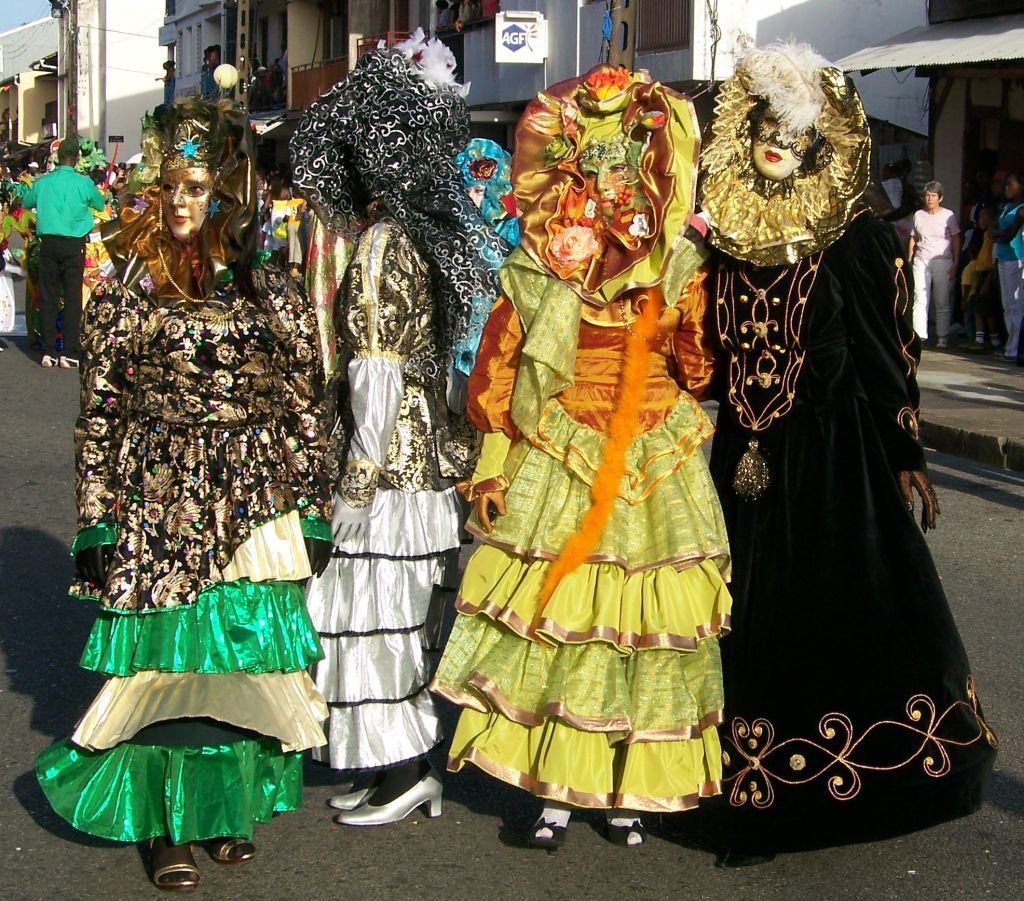
Touloulou in Cayenne streets in 2007

The Touloulou (French pronunciation: [tululu]) is the most famous of the typical characters and the queen of Guianan carnival.

== Description ==
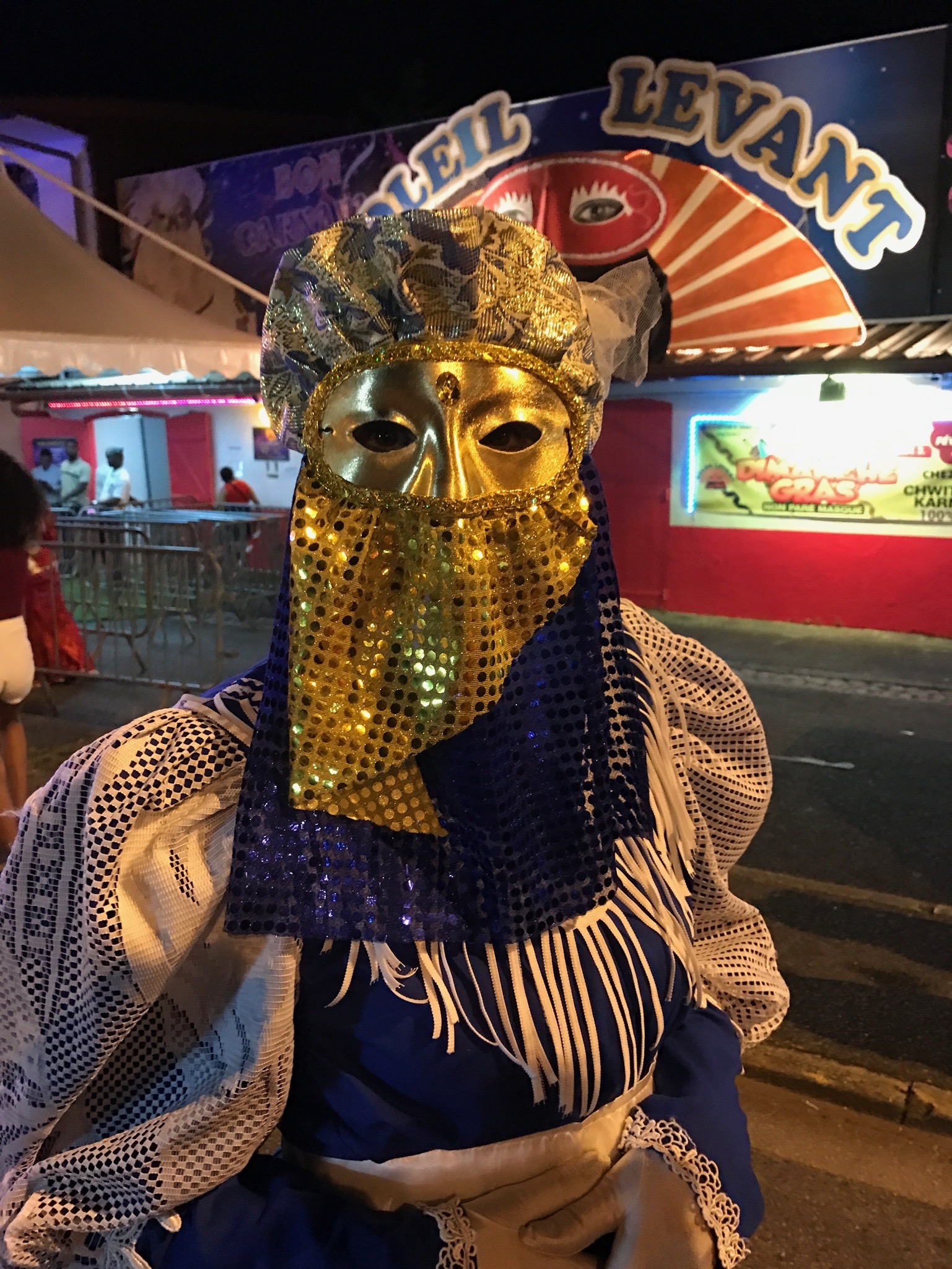
A Touloulou in front of the famous dance hall "Soleil Levant", in Cayenne.

The Touloulou is the queen of the carnival. It is a lady elegantly dressed from head to toe. They are normally women without an inch of skin showing. She wears a petticoat, a balaclava, a Domino mask and long gloves. In order not to be recognized, women go so far as to put colored lenses, wigs and camouflage their voices. They do not wear their usual perfume, buy pairs of shoes for the occasion that they will not return and do not move with their vehicle to remain anonymous. They parade in the street and participate in masked balls.

There is also a men's suit called Tololo.

In the nightclubs, renamed occasionally "universities", it is the touloulou who invite men to dance. They cannot refuse.

== Origin ==
This typical figure of Guianan Creole culture represents the bourgeois women of the 18 and 19th centuries, in their Sunday best, dressed in their heads to the feet.

This costume was initially not only worn by women. It was a disguise like any other and in no way recalled elegance but indeed in a satirical way, the women of that time. It was not until well after, in the twentieth century, that it began to be intended only for women, therefore feminized and finally lost its caricature to become a distinguished, refined and flirtatious representation of women in general, while keeping a mysterious side. This earned her the title of "Guiana Carnival Queen".

== Gallery ==
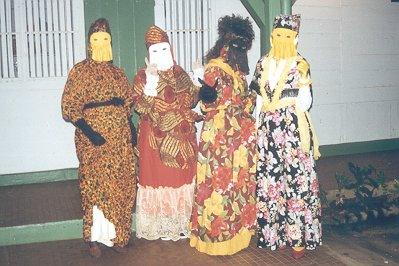
Touloulou with the traditional domino mask.

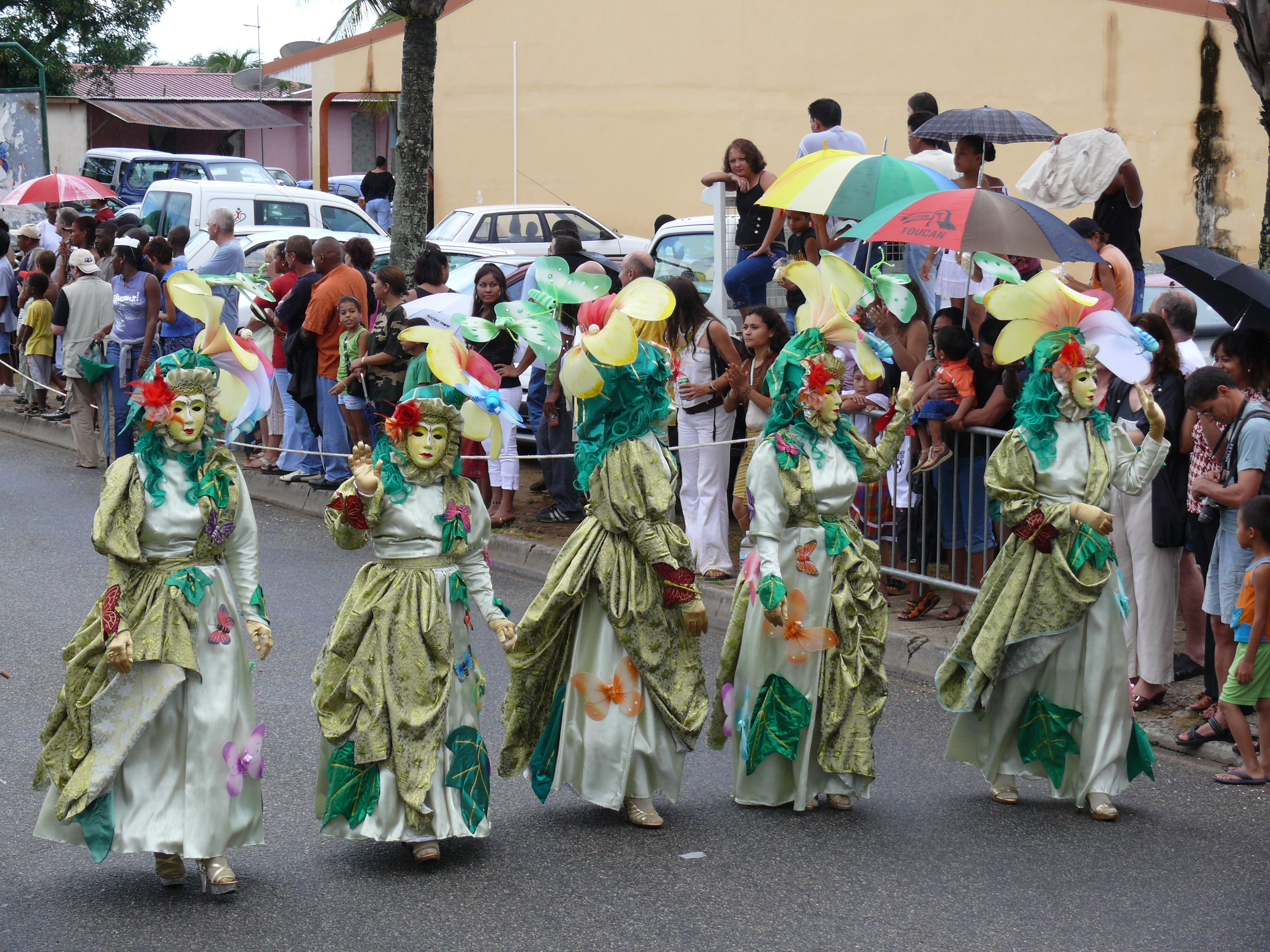
Touloulou at the 2007 Kourou Parade.

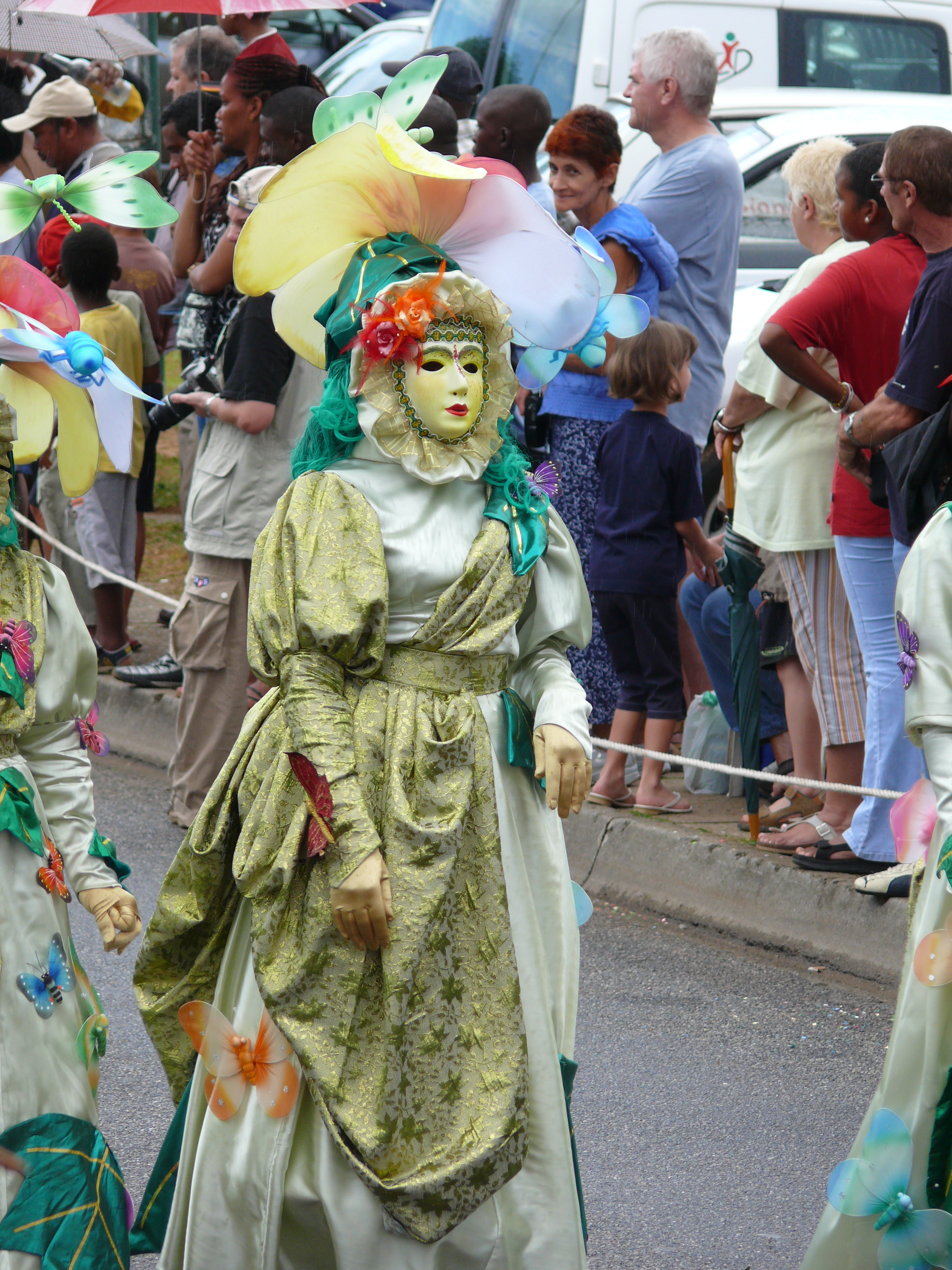

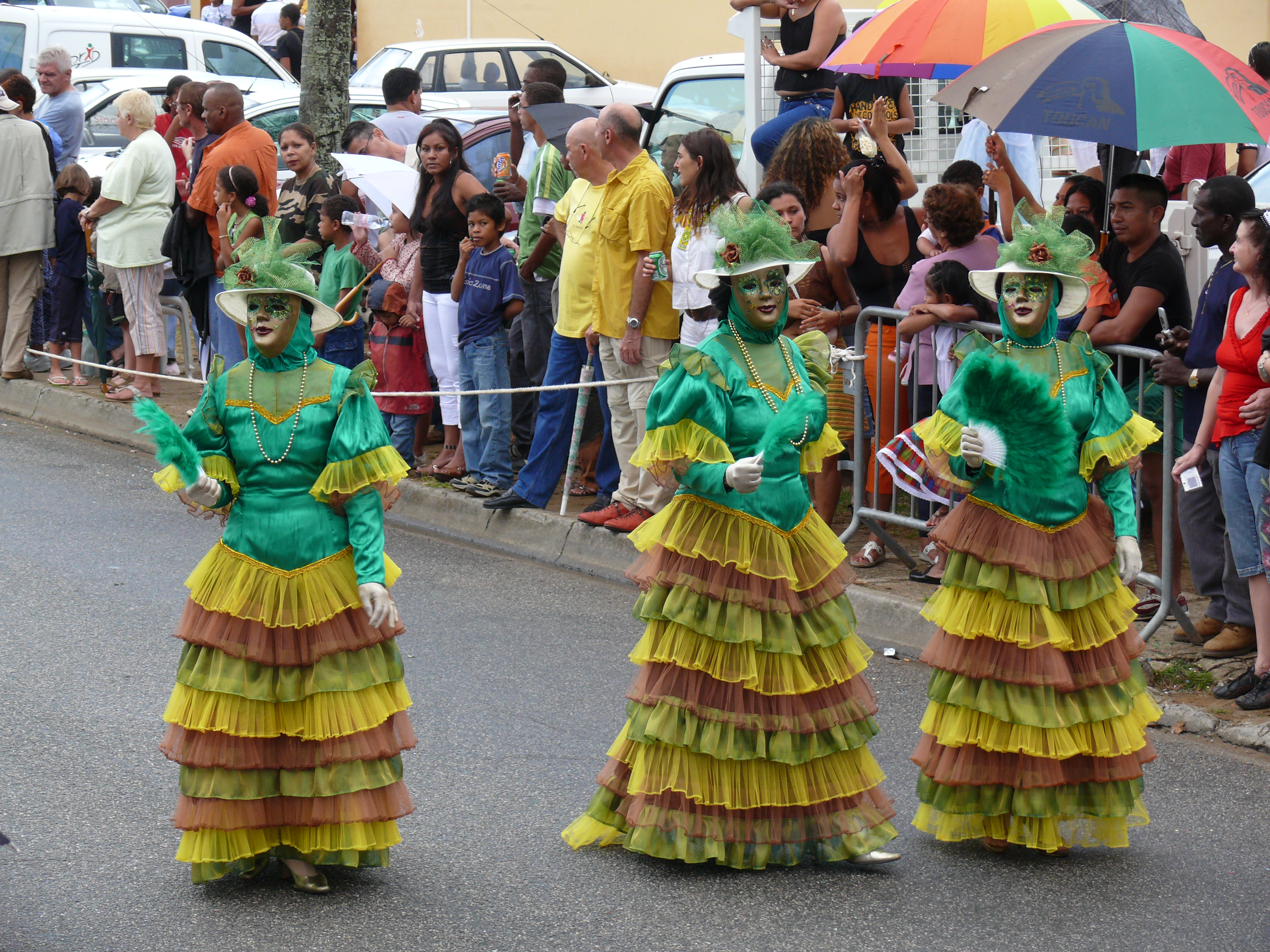

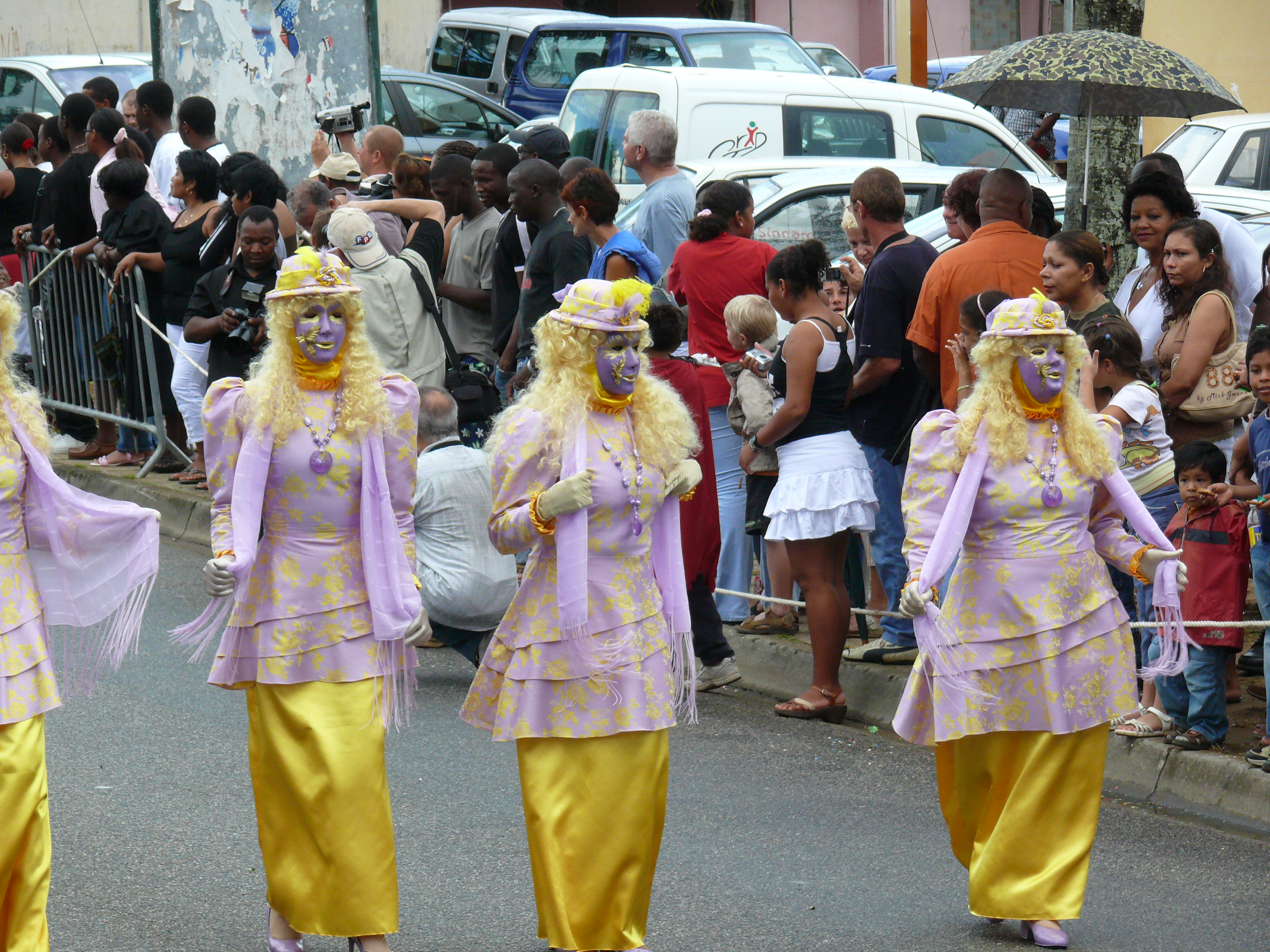

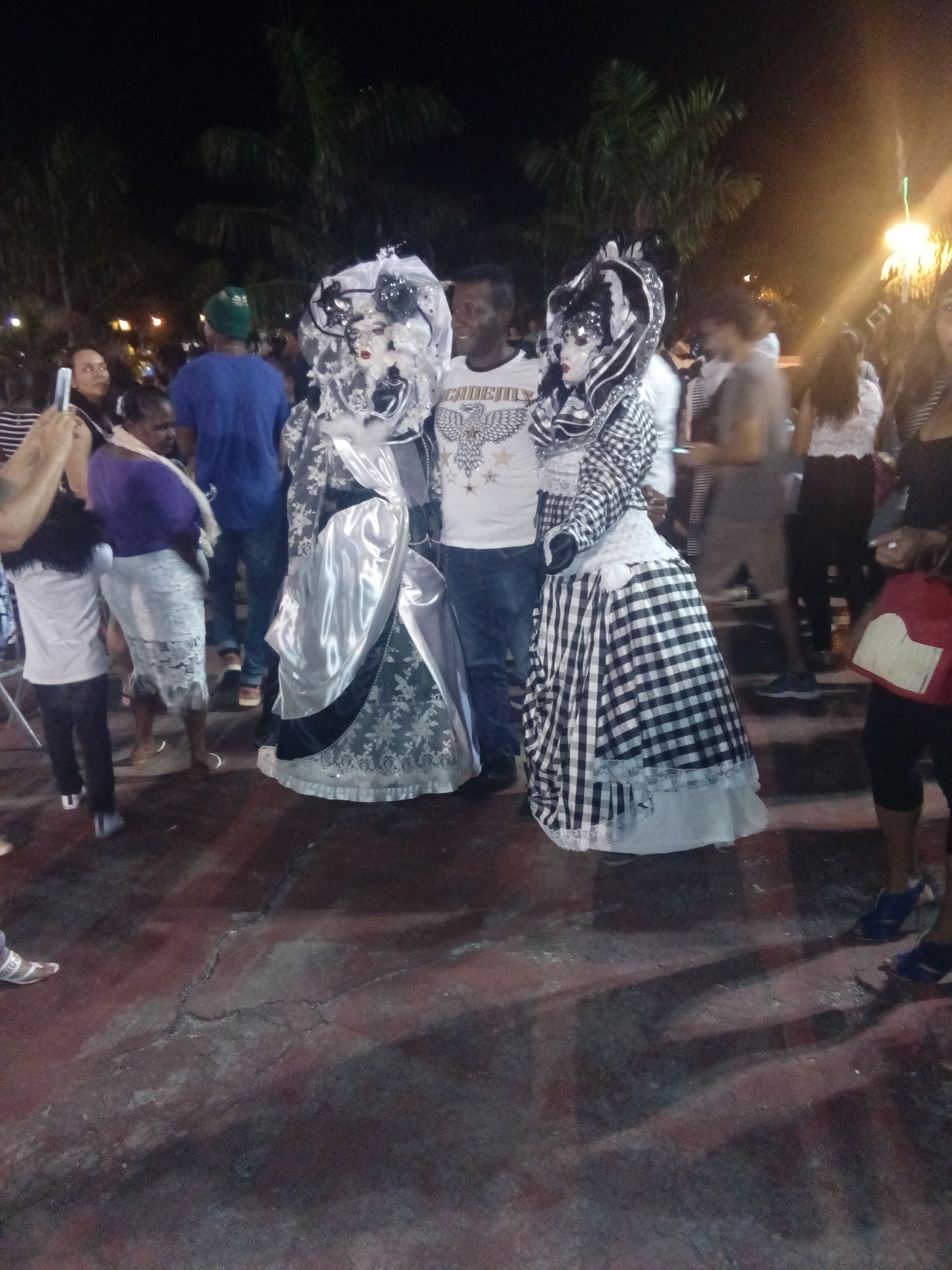
Touloulou in Cayenne.

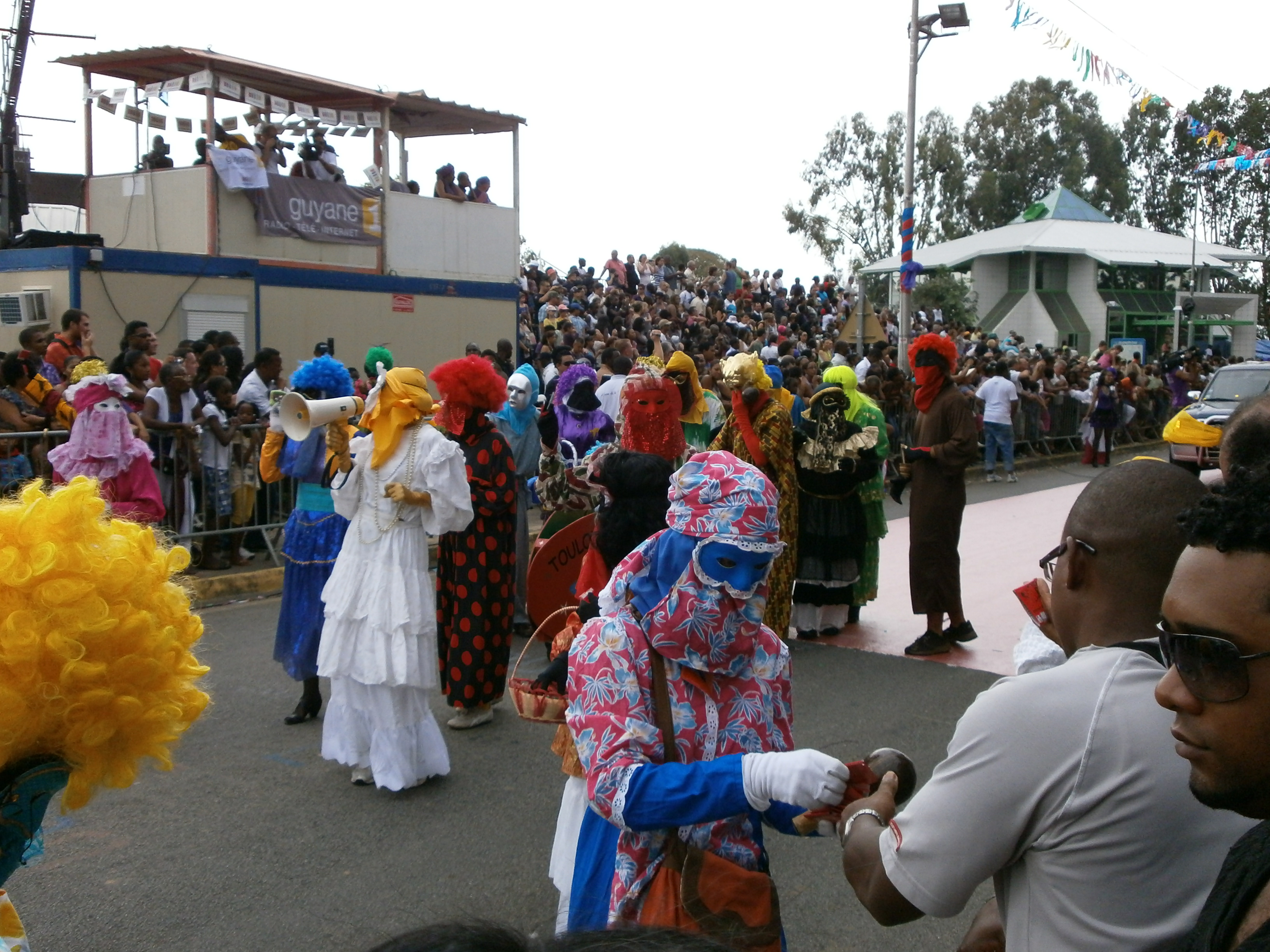
Touloulou parading during the Great Parade of Kourou.

== See also ==
- Carnival
- Carnival in French Guiana
- French Guiana
