= Vanuatu Broadcasting and Television Corporation =

National broadcaster of Vanuatu

The Vanuatu Broadcasting and Television Corporation (VBTC) is the national broadcaster of Vanuatu. It operates three radio stations (Radio Vanuatu, Paradise FM and Femme Pawa) and one television channel (Television Blong Vanuatu).

== History ==
VBTC was created during the colonial age, in a period where Vanuatu was a Franco-British condominium, first as Radio Vila and later Radio New Hebrides, initially broadcasting only ten minutes a day. As of 2013, it broadcasts "16 hours of news, information programs, music and entertainment". The station "has achieved almost nationwide coverage", and, as of 2000, used Bislama "approximately 80 percent of the time".

In July 1992, ahead of the 1992 Summer Olympics, it held experimental television broadcasts, becoming permanent in 1993, with the creation of Television Blong Vanuatu, set up with assistance from French overseas broadcaster RFO. That same year, the state established VBTC to manage both radio and television services. At an undated point in the 2010s, per an ABU profile, it employed 53 staff in Port Vila and four in Santo.

On 23 September 2019, redevelopment work for Radio Vanuatu's transmitting equipment began. On 18 December, the new shortwave service began.

The VBTC Act was amended in 2023; this enabled the corporation to have greater financial independence, instead of relaying solely on state funds.

== Controversies ==
VBTC suspended senior journalist Antoine Malsungai in December 2012 under allegations that Prime Minister Sato Kilman hadn't yet cleared a US$140,000 debt.
