= Vaval, the King of Carnival =

Vaval, the King is a key figure of Guadeloupe, Martinique French Guiana with some extent in Dominica and Saint Lucia as part of the island’s annual carnivals. Their opening ceremony usually starts on Saturday, preceding the Epiphany’s Sunday and is presided by Vaval, accompanied by the Queen and the Prince of Almire. The carnival begins with Vaval at the head of the first parade of the Carnival and ends with his death on a pyre at sunset on the Ash Wednesday. "Born to die, Vaval, King of Carnival embodies the time of the perpetual renewal and the strength of the present."

== Representation ==
Made from vegetable elements such as wood, straw or reeds, Vaval appears under various traits whether there are human traits or animal traits. When he takes the form of a human, he can be represented as corpulent, or thin, sometimes as laughing but others as resigned. Because he is the King of the Carnival, he is displaying an extravagant phallus. Depending on the collective imagination, he can come from the sky, waters or even the woods

== Meaning ==
=== Religious ===
The religious meaning behind the creation of the Carnival is, above all, a characteristic of the French Guiana. This festivity is seen as belonging to the Devil, as opposed to the Christian festivities. During the Carnival, it is said that all hell rises to Earth and demons come up to take Vaval to his death because he is a sinner. Here is all the ambiguity coming with the symbolic of the King of Carnival because while the festivities are authorized, they also are a celebration of what Satan represents. The pyre's flames on which Vaval dies, are a reminder for the population of the ones burning in Hell and of what they might expect, at the time of their own death, if they sin.

=== Political ===
Through the King of the Carnival, the population can publicly, once a year, express its opposition to the authorities without being punished for it. He helps regulate the relationship and the balance of power between the people and the public authorities. His repeated appearance and death are means to bring an end to political and social conflicts without any act of violence. "The politics revives annually under the sacrificial form of a liberating death."

=== Social ===
Besides having a religious and political meaning, Vaval, the King, also has a social meaning: he represents the public disorder, specific to festivities such as the Carnival. All the things, typical to public disorder like the disguises, the excesses (sexual or alcohol), the criticism, the mockery and the shift from a "normal" to an "absurd" social life, are merged into one entity that is Vaval, the King of the Carnival. This figure is also the personification of all the social wrongs (diseases, collective misfortune, etc.) that have happened during the past year, thus, the necessity for his death.

== Death ==
It is on the Ash Wednesday, day of grief, that the King Vaval is destined to die. He has to die in order to revive the following year. On that day, a big funeral parade takes place to pay him tribute and everybody has to wear black and white. Groups of mourners and of prayers compound this parade. The type of death depends on the « vidé » (parades), it goes from hanging, or cremation to drowning him. His death is extremely ritualized because through it, all the social wrongs and misfortunes disappear. His death is a means for the population to suppress any source of conflicts and thus, to reinforce their cohesion. On the other hand, the death of Vaval is beneficial also for the public authorities because it means that the social life is coming back to normal. Through his death, the public authorities demonstrate that they still have the power to eradicate any reason for disorder and therefore, still have the upper hand over the King of disorder.

Though the Saint Lucian Carnival no longer takes place before Ash Wednesday (it is now set in July) - the tradition of the death of Vaval does take place, as they téwé Vaval (bury Vaval). While in Dominica the burial ceremony of Vaval takes place in Carib Country.
