= French Guianese Creole =

French-based creole of French Guiana

- Kriyòl gwiyannen, kréyòl (gwiyanè)
- Native to: French Guiana
- Region: South America
- Native speakers: 134,000 (2019)
- Language family: French Creole: French Guianese Creole

Official status
- Official language in: French Guiana

Language codes
- ISO 639-3: gcr
- Glottolog: guia1246
- ELP: NE
- Linguasphere: 51-AAC-cd (varieties: 51-AAC-cda to -cdd)

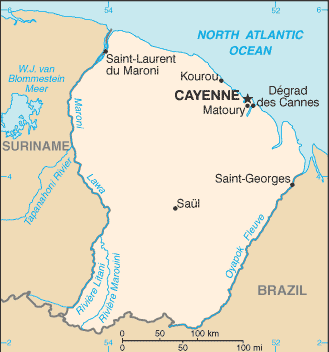
French Guiana, where French Guianese Creole originates.

Interview
Interview of Marie-Annick Atticot at the États généraux du multilinguisme dans les outre-mer (december 2011).

French Guianese Creole (Kriyòl; also called variously Guianan Creole, Guianese Creole in English and Créole guyanais in French) is a French-based creole language spoken in French Guiana and by French Guianese abroad, including in neighboring Suriname and Brazil. It resembles Antillean Creole, but there are some lexical and grammatical differences between them. Antilleans can generally understand French Guianese Creole, though there may be some instances of confusion. The differences consist of more French and Brazilian Portuguese influences (due to the proximity of Brazil and Portuguese presence in the country for several years). There are also words of Amerindian and African origin. There are French Guianese communities in Suriname and Brazil who continue to speak the language.

It should not be confused with the Guyanese Creole language, based on English, spoken in nearby Guyana.

== History ==
French Guianese Creole was a language spoken between slaves and settlers. But the conditions of French Guianese Creole's constitution were quite different from the Creole of the West Indies, on the one hand because of the conflicts between French, English, Dutch, Portuguese and Spanish, and French dialects such as the Caen have greatly influenced French Guianese Creole, which has made it significantly different from the Creoles of Martinique, Haiti, St. Lucia and Guadeloupe.

There are, therefore, in French Guianese Creole many words in common with the Creoles of the West Indies. However, a number of words differentiate them significantly.

In addition, in French Guiana, the letter 'r' is mostly preserved in onset position, whereas in the West Indies the pronunciation of 'r' tends rather to approximate the semi-vowel /w/.

Vocabulary	Pronunciation in French	In French Guianese Creole	Meaning in English
riz	/ʁi/	douri	rice
dormir	/dɔʁ.miʁ/	dronmi	sleep

Possessive determiners are placed before the noun:

In French	In French Guianese Creole	In English
ma maison	mo kaz	my house
leurs enfants	yé timoun	their children
sa femme	so fanm/So madanm	his wife

== Orthography and phonology ==
French Guianese Creole is largely written using the French alphabet, with only a few exceptions. 'Q' and 'X' are replaced by 'k' and 'z' respectively. 'C' is not used apart from in the digraph, ch, where it stands for [ʃ] (the word for horse is chouval, similar to French's cheval). Otherwise, it is replaced by 'k' when it stands for [k] (Standard French's comment (how) is written kouman) and 's', when it stands for [s]. Silent 'h' is never written, unlike in Standard French, where it remains for etymological reasons. The diphthong 'OU' is replaced by 'w' when it stands for [w]. The diphthong 'OI' is replaced by 'we', but by 'o' in the words "mo" and "to".

== Examples ==
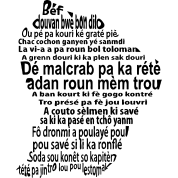
French Guianese Creole phrases making the shape of French Guiana

French Guianese Creole (IPA)	Metropolitan French	English
Bonswè /bõswɛ/	Bonsoir	Good evening
Souplé /suːple/	S'il vous plaît	Please
Mèsi /mɛsi/	Merci	Thank you
Mo /mo/	Moi, me, je	Me, I
To /to/	Toi, te, tu	You
I, L, Li /i, l, li/	Lui, le, la	He, She, Him, Her, It
Roun /ʁuːn/	Un, une	One
Eskizé mo /ɛskize mo/	Excusez-moi	Excuse me, pardon me
Lapli ka tonbé /laˈpliː ka tõbe/	Il pleut	It's raining
Jod-la a roun bèl jou /ʒodˈla a ruːn bel ʒu/	Aujourd'hui, il fait beau	Today is a beautiful day
A kouman to fika? /a kumã to fika/	(Comment) ça va?	How are you?
Mari a mo manman /maʁi a mo mãˈmã/	Marie est ma mère	Marie is my mother
Rodolf a to frè /ʁodolf a to frɛ/	Rodolphe est ton frère	Rudolph is your brother
I ka alé laplaj /i kaːle laˈplaʒ/	Il va à la plage	He's going to the beach
Mo pa mélé /mo pa mele/	Je m'en moque	I don't care
