= Huet de Navarre =

Commander of Cayenne
- In office c. March 1652 – September 1652
- Preceded by: Charles Poncet de Brétigny ...
- Succeeded by: ... Guerin Spranger

Personal details
- Occupation: Soldier

Huet de Navarre was a French soldier who was briefly governor of the colony of Cayenne in what is now French Guiana in 1652. An 1888 biography has been shown to be largely fictitious, and little is known of his life.

== Life ==
A life of Huet de Navarre is given in Appletons' Cyclopædia of American Biography, Volume 3 (1888). It relates how Huet de Navarre was born in Conde sur Noireau in 1611, was lieutenant to a French expedition under Poncet de Bretigny that established a colony on the banks of the Cayenne River in 1643, was elected governor of the colony in 1644 after Bretigny had been murdered, was reelected head of the colony after a new French expedition arrived in 1652, and died in Suriname in 1656 after the French had been driven from Cayenne. Unfortunately, it has been shown that although there was a M. de Navarre in Cayenne in 1652, most of the Appleton's biography must be considered fictitious.

It is known that in 1643 Charles Poncet de Brétigny of the Compagnie de Rouen^{(fr)}, arrived with 400 settlers. He bought the hill at the mouth of the Cayenne River from the local Kalina people (Caribs) and named it "Morne Cépérou" after the Kalina chief who sold it. The first wooden Fort Cépérou was built on the hill, and a village was built below it. Bretigny was ruthless and despotic, and terrorized both the colonists and the indigenous people. In 1644 a Kalina killed Bretigny with an axe to the head.

In September 1652 the twelve seigneurs of the Compagnie de la France équinoxiale landed 800 men at the tip of the Pointe du Mahury, where they found 25 survivors from the previous expedition. According to Jean Laon the 1652 expedition found a Monsieur de Navarre in command of Fort Cépérou. He had arrived there from France about six months earlier, and was a first sergeant. He was promoted to lieutenant for surrendering the fort to the new arrivals. All of the new settlers were soon killed by the Caribs or had escaped to Barbados.

There is therefore an element of truth, but most of the Appleton's account from before or after 1652 is either unlikely or impossible.

== Sources ==
- Bailey, Gauvin Alexander (2018-06-06), Architecture and Urbanism in the French Atlantic Empire: State, Church, and Society, 1604-1830, MQUP, ISBN 978-0-7735-5376-7
- Les origines du Fort Cépérou et de la ville de Cayenne (in French), Mairie de Cayenne
- Schindler, Margaret Castle (July 1937), "Fictitious Biography", The American Historical Review, 42 (4), Oxford University Press on behalf of the American Historical Association: 680–690, doi:10.2307/1839450, JSTOR 1839450
