= Compagnie de la France équinoxiale =

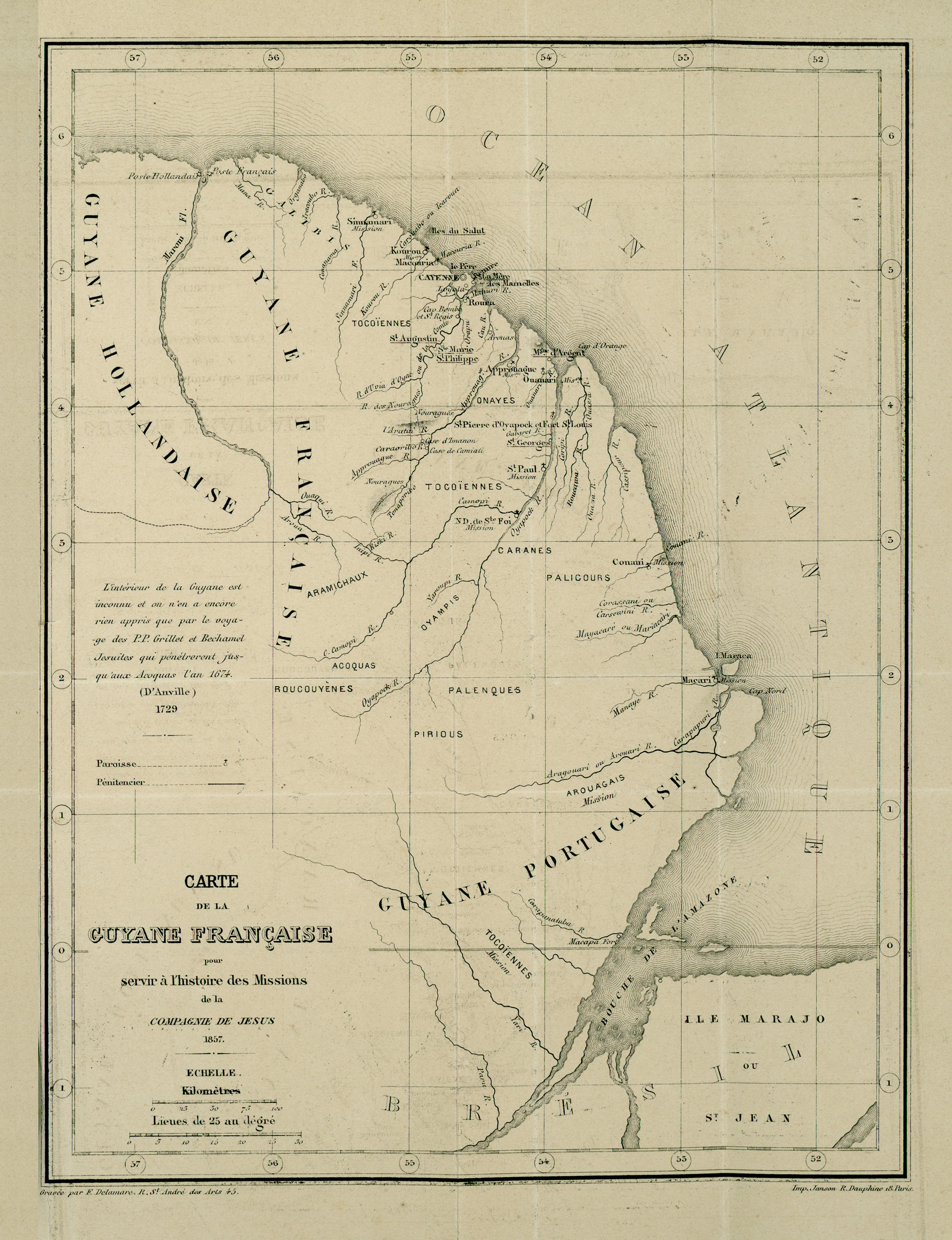
- Map of French Guiana published in 1857. (Note: Cap du Nord defines the boundary between French and Portuguese Guiana under the Treaty of Utrecht. In the 1857 map shown here the cape is just north of the mouth of the Araguari River. The Portuguese considered that Cap du Nord was just south of the Oyapock river, shown on this map as shown as Cap d'Orange.)
- Predecessor: Compagnie du cap du Nord
- Merged into: 1664
- Successor: Compagnie des Indes Occidentales
- Formation: 1651, 1663
- Legal status: Defunct
- Purpose: Colonization of South America
- Headquarters: Paris

The Compagnie de la France équinoxiale (Equinoctial France Company), or Compagnie de l'establissement des colonies françoises dans les terres fermes de l'Amerique, was a French enterprise formed in 1651 to colonize equatorial South America. The enterprise soon failed. In 1663 it was relaunched, but the next year was merged into a general company for all French possessions in the Americas. The colony of Cayenne, the nucleus of French Guiana, was eventually secured in 1674.

== Background ==
"Equinoctial France" (France équinoxiale) was the name given to the part of South America between the Orinoco and Amazon River – the Guianas. The French government gave several companies the right of commerce and navigation in these countries. The first was given to the merchants of Rouen in 1633 and confirmed by letters patent in 1638. Settlements were founded at the mouth of the Cayenne River in 1634 and 1636.

In 1643, a new company was formed in Rouen called the Compagnie du cap du Nord, which obtained letters patent that ceded it all the land between the Orinoco and the Amazon. It was headed by Charles Poncet de Brétigny. Poncet de Brétigny led a group of colonists to Cayenne Island, where he disembarked on 4 March 1644 and collected those who remained of the first settlers. The first wooden Fort Cépérou was built on a hill beside the river's estuary and a village was built below it. Brétigny was ruthless and despotic, and terrorized both the colonists and the indigenous people. The next year Brétigny and most of the Europeans were killed by the Caribs, and the village of Cayenne was destroyed.

== First company ==
French Guiana in South America

The first Compagnie de la France équinoxiale was given the same privileges as the Compagnie du cap du Nord towards the end of 1651. It was led by twelve seigneurs. Also known as the Compagnie de l’Amerique Equinoxial, it was a Paris-based joint stock company sponsored by notables such as the Abbé Marivault of the Sorbonne, the Sieur le Roux de Royville from Normandy, La Boulaye, Secretary of the Marine, and Jean-Jacques Dolu, grand audiencier at the court and intendant of New France in 1620. The company recruited 800 colonists, male and female, to settle in Guiana.

The priest Antoine Biet took part in the expedition as a chaplain, and describes it in his Voyage de la France équinoxiale en l'isle de Cayenne entrepris par les françois en l'année M. DC. LII. (Paris, 1664). Abbé Marivault drowned during the embarkation at Honfleur. Balthazar Le Roux de Royville, who led the expedition, was assassinated by the sailors and thrown overboard during the voyage. In September 1652 the expedition reached the tip of the Pointe du Mahury on the Island of Cayenne, where they found the 25 survivors of the earlier settlement.

A Monsieur de Navarre was in command of Fort Cépérou. He had arrived there from France about six months earlier, and was a first sergeant. He was promoted to lieutenant for surrendering the fort to the new arrivals. Jean de Laon, a king' engineer, replaced the wooden walls of the fort with a stone bastion called Fort Saint Michel to guard against attacks from the Caribs across the river, and attacks by the English and Dutch. There were violent disputes among the colonists and between them and the local Kalina people. The attempt to found a colony ended in failure. Of the 700 colonists just over 100 survived and escaped to Suriname in January 1654, then to Barbados. The company went bankrupt when it emerged that it was not backed by the king.

== Interlude ==
A Dutch soldier, Guerin Spranger, obtained a grant from the States General of the Netherlands and established a Dutch colony on Cayenne Island around 1656. He arrived after the French had abandoned the island. The Dutch established plantations and Spranger had begun a profitable trade with the Netherlands when the French decided to regain control, despite being at peace with the Netherlands at the time.

== Second company ==
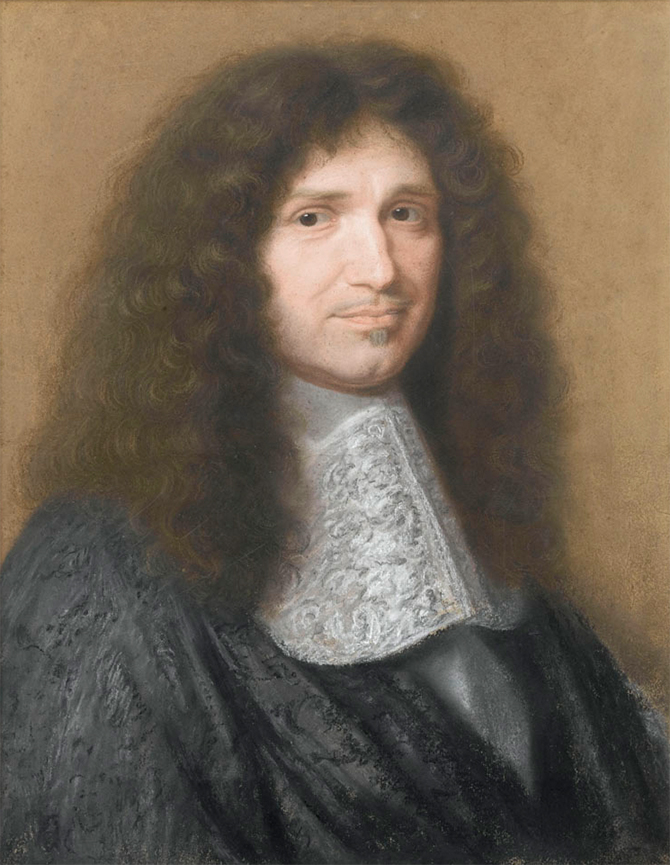
Jean-Baptiste Colbert, originator of the second Compagnie de la France équinoxiale

The second Compagnie de la France équinoxiale was formed in 1663. The minister Jean-Baptiste Colbert conceived the idea of a new Compagnie de la France équinoxiale, and King Louis XIV approved the project. The new company had a capital of 200,000 francs, and all the privileges that had been granted to the first.

Antoine Lefèbvre de La Barre, former intendant of the Bourbonnais and a very able man, was appointed governor of Cayenne. He left the port of La Rochelle, France, on 26 February 1664 with two warships and 400 soldiers. He was carried on a fleet commanded by Alexandre de Prouville de Tracy. The expedition included 1,200 settlers. Lefèbvre arrived in Cayenne on 11 May 1664. On 15 May 1664 the Dutch general Spranger agreed to capitulate.

Lefèbvre de La Barre established a garrison at Fort Cépérou and started construction of a settlement of 200 huts. He made a treaty with the indigenous people and began colonization in very favourable circumstances. However, the enterprise soon ran into serious difficulty.

== Aftermath ==
In 1664, Louis XIV revoked all the concessions made to specific companies and created the French West India Company for all the American colonies. The Compagnie de la France équinoxiale was merged into that company, and Lefèbvre de La Barre was recalled to take charge of the new enterprise. De la Barre was made governor of Cayenne and of the Antilles.

However, the English and the Dutch captured the French establishments, and it was not until 1674 that Marshall Jean II d'Estrées restored French power in Guiana. Louis XIV took all the colonies into his domain in 1674, and the governors were now royal officers.

== See also ==
- List of French colonial trading companies
- List of chartered companies

== Sources ==
- Anonyme de Grenade (2013), Voyageurs anonymes aux Antilles (PDF) (in French), L’Harmattan
- Arbell, Mordehay (2002), The Jewish Nation of the Caribbean: The Spanish-Portuguese Jewish Settlements in the Caribbean and the Guianas, Gefen Publishing House Ltd, ISBN 978-965-229-279-7
- Bailey, Gauvin Alexander (2018-06-06), Architecture and Urbanism in the French Atlantic Empire: State, Church, and Society, 1604-1830, MQUP, ISBN 978-0-7735-5376-7
- Biet, Antoine (1664), Voyage de la France équinoxiale en l'isle de Cayenne entrepris par les françois en l'année M. DC. LII., Paris: François Clouzier
- Brunelle, Gayle K (2013), "The Assassination of the Sieur de Royville and the Debacle of the Compagnie de l'Amerique Equinoxial, 1651–1654", Terrae Incognitae, 45 (2): 99–112, doi:10.1179/0082288413Z.00000000020
- Denis, Ferdinand (1837), Brésil (in French), Firmin Didot frères, fils et c
- Julien; Lanier; Cosnard (1857), Mission de Cayenne et de la Guyane Française (Avec une carte geographique.), Voyages et travaux des missionnaires de la compagnie de Jésus: pour servir de complément aux lettres édifiantes (in French)
- "Les origines de Cayenne : la le-gende et l'histoire", nofi (in French), 12 June 2018
- Les origines du Fort Cépérou et de la ville de Cayenne (in French), Mairie de Cayenne
- Malte-Brun, Victor-Adolphe (1865), "Histoire de a Guyane", La France illustrée. Géographie, histoire, administration et statistique (in French), Gustave Barba
- Mercier, Jean Edouard (1 April 2009), "Le XVIIe Siècle" (PDF), L'armée française et la Guyane (in French), Ibis Rouge Editions, ISBN 978-2-84450-350-3, archived from the original (PDF) on 2018-07-27
- Rivière, Léon (1866), La Guyane française en 1865: aperçu géographique, historique, législatif, agricole, industriel et commercial (in French), Impr. du gouvernement
- Schindler, Margaret Castle (July 1937), "Fictitious Biography", The American Historical Review, 42 (4): 680–690, doi:10.2307/1839450, JSTOR 1839450
- Southey, Robert (1819), History of Brazil, Longman, Hurst, Rees, and Orme

== See also ==
- List of French colonial trading companies
