= Contout =

Contout is a surname. Notable people with the surname include:

- Auxence Contout (1925–2020), French writer
- Hubert Contout, French Guianan football manager
- Roy Contout (born 1985), French Guianan footballer
