= Macouria =

Commune in French Guiana, France

- Commune
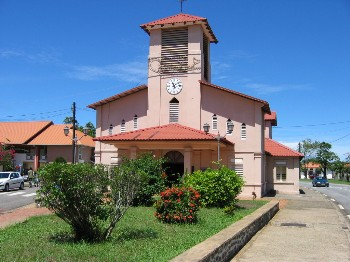
- View of the Church of Saint-Jean-Baptiste of Tonate, along the RN1 road

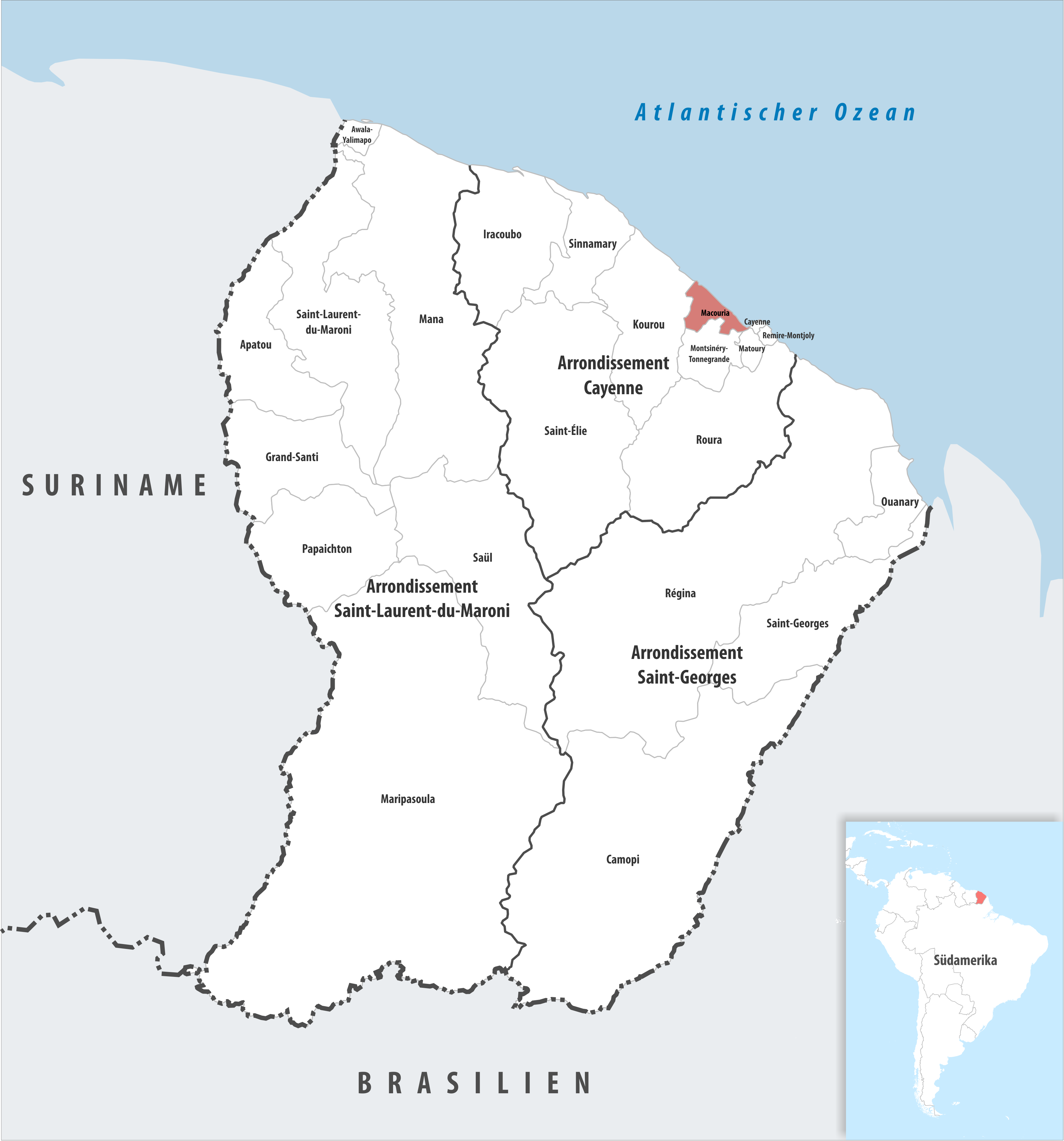
- Location of the commune (in red) within French Guiana
- Location of Macouria
- Coordinates: 5°00′50″N 52°28′27″W
- Country: France
- Overseas region and department: French Guiana
- Arrondissement: Cayenne
- Intercommunality: CA Centre Littoral

Government
  - Mayor (2020–2026): Gilles Adelson
- Area^{1}: 377.5 km^{2} (145.8 sq mi)
- Highest elevation: 183 m (600 ft)
- Lowest elevation: 0 m (0 ft)
- Population (2023): 19,899
  - Density: 52.71/km^{2} (136.5/sq mi)
- Time zone: UTC−03:00
- INSEE/Postal code: 97305 /97355
- ^{1} French Land Register data, which excludes lakes, ponds, glaciers > 1 km^{2} (0.386 sq mi or 247 acres) and river estuaries.

Macouria (French pronunciation: [makuʁja]; French Guianese Creole: Makouya) is a commune of French Guiana located midway between Cayenne and Kourou, an overseas region and department of France located in South America. The seat of the commune is the settlement of Tonate, and so the commune is also known unofficially as Macouria-Tonate. The French Guiana Zoo is located in the commune.

== Geography ==
Macouria is one of the smallest cities of French Guiana. The town is separated in the east with Matoury, by the Larivot Bridge, crossing the Cayenne River. Its southern limit is marked by the Montsinéry River, which separates it with the eponymous city. Westward there is Kourou and in the north the town is the Atlantic Ocean.

== Urbanization ==
The population is mainly located south and along the national road RN1 because of 2 km wide mangrove swamp situated in the North.

- From the Larivot bridge to the town centre, on approximately 28 km, there are many villages.
- From the town center to Kourou, there are few inhabitants except in the farming areas of "La Césarée" and "Matiti".

The main inhabited zones are:

- Maillard : a neighborhood which will host 600 houses on the long run organized around the blue lake, which is a former quarry.
- Soula : located in the East of the town not far away from Cayenne.
- Matiti: situated 10 km after the town centre, it is based on land given back by the Guiana Space Centre.

== History ==
The area was first described in 1604 by Daniel de La Touche de La Ravardière. He counted many Amerindian settlements. Around 1716, the commune was settled with plantations. Tonat build the first house and cotton mill.

In the middle of the 19th century, Macouria was part of the canton of Cayenne. 1488 slaves stood for 93% of the population of the "neighborhood" led by Jean-Baptiste Tonat. They worked in a plantation called "La Béarnaise". On it, there were :

- 25 ha of sugar cane
- 8 ha of cofe
- 60 ha of roucou
- 1100 ha of cotton

In tribute to the leader of the neighbourhood Tonat, the zone was called "Tonate Bourg" and given to the state.

In 1848, year of the abolition of slavery some free Africans and 55 Indian migrants arrived in the city. From 1864 to 1970 the population decreased, mainly because of the lack of activity on it.

== Population ==
Historical population
Year	Pop.	±% p.a.
1967	384	—
1974	490	+3.54%
1982	446	−1.17%
1990	2,069	+21.14%
1999	5,050	+10.42%
2007	8,191	+6.23%
2012	10,358	+4.81%
2017	14,202	+6.52%
2023	19,899	+5.78%
Source: INSEE

== Sights ==
The French Guiana Zoo is located in Macouria on the road to Montsinéry.

== Notable people ==
- Emmanuel Prince, politician and carnival leadership figure

== See also ==
- Communes of French Guiana
- Farnous
