= Charles Poncet de Brétigny =

Governor of Cayenne
- In office 4 March 1644 – June 1645
- Succeeded by: Huet de Navarre

Personal details
- Died: 1645 Cayenne, French Guiana

Charles Poncet de Brétigny (c. 1610 – 1644) was founder and governor of the French colony of Cayenne, in what is now French Guiana, from 1644 to 1645. A brutal and despotic man, after just over a year he was murdered by a Carib, as were most of the other colonists. Accounts of the events and aftermath are somewhat confused, gathered from the few survivors several years later.

== Life ==
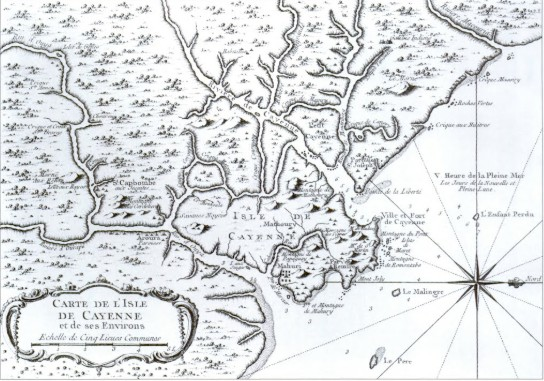
Map of the Island of Cayenne and its surroundings in 1729. North to the right.

Charles Poncet, seigneur de Brétigny was born around 1610.

Poncet de Brétigny was appointed admiral, lieutenant-general of King Louis XIII and head of the Compagnie de Rouen^{(fr)}. Poncet de Brétigny led a group of colonists to Cayenne for the company, also called the Compagnie du Cap au nord. (Note: Earlier settlements had been founded at the mouth of the Cayenne in 1634 and 1636.) His objective was to found new settlements at Cap Nord (Note: The Cap Nord was the land between the Amazon River and the Oyapock or Vincent-Pinson River, which under the 11 April 1713 Treaty of Utrecht was taken as the boundary between the French and Portuguese Guianas.) and on the Maroni River. He disembarked on Cayenne Island on 4 March 1644, and collected the remains of the first settlers, men who had adopted the customs and language of the local Galibi people.

Brétigny landed with 400 men at the cove of Armire, later the site of the city of Remire-Montjoly. After two days' march along the coast he chose the Morne Cépérou, a hill on the coast at the mouth of the Cayenne River as the site for what would become the city of Cayenne. He purchased the hill from Cépérou, chief of the Amerindian tribe of Galibi people (Caribs). The first wooden Fort Cépérou was built on the hill, and a village was built below it. The three hundred men he had brought were, apart from a few officers, vagabonds and fortune hunters rather than artisans and farmers.

Brétigny was governor of Cayenne from 4 March 1644 until June 1645. He was ruthless and despotic, and terrorized both the colonists and the indigenous people. He seems to have been a mentally unstable megalomaniac. De Bretigny soon began to behave as if he were in possession of an organized kingdom. He appointed a captain of the guards, a squire and a chancellor. He had an iron stamp made with his name to brand the front of colonists who disobeyed him. He had eight soldiers broken for the most frivolous reasons, and another received the strap for having picked up a sprig of pepper. The indigenous people were treated no better, and soon planned an uprising.

== Death ==
One source says a Galibi woman warned Bretigny of the plot, who had some of the Galibis arrested, but others escaped and swam to the mainland. Bretigny pursued them in a canoe, captured them and held them in a grass hut. The next day he found himself surrounded by a large number of Indians who shot and killed him with arrows. The natives then went to the Island of Cayenne, where they burned the harvests and massacred the colonists. Another source says Brétigny was killed by an Amerindian named Pagaret in a savanna near to Cayenne, which has preserved this name. His head was split open by an axe. Most of the Europeans were killed by the Caribs, and the village of Cayenne was destroyed.

== Aftermath ==
Some missionaries and forty men managed to escape. In November of that year the Company of Rouen sent forty men to the colony under the sieur Laforét. All of them were massacred the next month apart from one man named Le Vendangeur who got away to Suriname and from there returned to France. In September 1652 the twelve seigneurs of the Compagnie de la France équinoxiale landed 800 men at the tip of the Pointe du Mahury, where they found 25 survivors from the previous expedition. The found a Monsieur de Navarre in command of Fort Cépérou. He had arrived there from France about six months earlier, and was a first sergeant. He was promoted to lieutenant for surrendering the fort to the new arrivals. All of the new settlers were soon killed by the Caribs or had escaped to Barbados.

== Sources ==
- Bailey, Gauvin Alexander (2018-06-06), Architecture and Urbanism in the French Atlantic Empire: State, Church, and Society, 1604-1830, MQUP, ISBN 978-0-7735-5376-7
- Cahoun, Ben, "French Guiana", World Statesmen
- "Les origines de Cayenne : la le-gende et l'histoire", nofi (in French), 12 June 2018
- Les origines du Fort Cépérou et de la ville de Cayenne (in French), Mairie de Cayenne
- Rivière, Léon (1866), La Guyane française en 1865: aperçu géographique, historique, législatif, agricole, industriel et commercial (in French), Impr. du gouvernement
- Rosamel, Vice-Amiral de (1838), Bourbon. - Guyana Francaise (in French), Impr. Royale
- Schindler, Margaret Castle (July 1937), "Fictitious Biography", The American Historical Review, 42 (4), Oxford University Press on behalf of the American Historical Association: 680–690, doi:10.2307/1839450, JSTOR 1839450
- Un peu d'Histoire (in French), Mairie de Cayenne
