= Appletons' Cyclopædia of American Biography =

Collection of biographies of notable people involved in the history of the New World

Volume V of a Revised Edition (1900)

Appletons' Cyclopædia of American Biography is a six-volume collection of biographies of notable people involved in the history of the New World. Published between 1887 and 1889, its unsigned articles were widely accepted as authoritative for several decades. Later the encyclopedia became notorious for including dozens of biographies of people who had never existed. In nearly all articles about the Cyclopædia various authors have erroneously spelled the title as Appleton's Cyclopædia of American Biography, placing the apostrophe in the wrong place.

== Overview ==
The Cyclopædia included the names of over 20,000 native and adopted citizens of the United States, including living persons. Also included were the names of several thousand citizens of all the other countries of North and South America. The aim was to embrace all noteworthy persons of the New World. The work also contained the names of nearly 1,000 people of foreign birth who were closely identified with American history. The Cyclopædia was illustrated with about sixty full-page portraits supplemented by some 1,500 smaller vignette portraits accompanied by facsimile autographs, and also several hundred views of birthplaces, residences, monuments, and tombs famous in history.

None of the articles are signed either with names or with initials. The clue to authorship is obtained, when obtained at all, through a list of contributors and their contributions arranged alphabetically as to contributors. One reviewer found this a rather inconvenient method, complaining that the finding of the author of a particular sketch often involved a voyage of discovery through the entire list. These lists are searched in vain, however, for the authors of many sketches, including the one of President Grover Cleveland.

== Fictitious biographies ==
Appletons' Cyclopædia is notorious for including 144 known biographies of fictitious persons, with a further nine biographies known to be suspicious.

The first discovery of these fictitious biographies was in 1919 by John Hendley Barnhart, (Note: The event was amusing and momentous enough to be mentioned in the obituary written at Barnhart's death, Obituary Notices of Fellows of the Royal Society 7.19 (November 1950: 35–61) p. 52.) when he identified and reprinted, with commentary, 14 biographical sketches of supposed European botanists who had come to the New World to study in Latin America.

By 1939, 47 fictitious biographies had been discovered, though only the letters H and V had been systematically investigated.

The status of fictitious biographies in Appletons' Cyclopædia was also assessed by Margaret Castle Schindler of Goucher College in 1937. According to Schindler,

The writer (or writers) of these articles must have had some scientific training, for most of the creations were scientists, and sufficient linguistic knowledge to have invented or adapted titles in six languages. He was certainly familiar with the history and geography of South America. Most of the places visited by his characters are real places, and most of the historical events in which they participated are genuine. However, he sometimes made mistakes by which his fraudulent work can be detected.

While three of the fictitious biographies (those of Joseph Dombey, Rafael Ferrer and Huet de Navarre) were about a real person, most of the details in these biographies were fictitious.

The fictitious biographies can be identified by one or more of the following significant issues:

- The presence of details copied from other sources, including legitimate biographies in the Cyclopædia.
- Various factual errors and anachronisms, including in relation to geography, institutions, and supposed honors and accomplishments.
- A remarkable disconnect between the profession attributed to a subject, their lifelong career, and their character and interests as suggested by the titles of their supposed literary works.
- A marked incompatibility between a subject's supposed nationality and the language(s) used in the titles of their supposed literary works.
- The presence of spelling, style and grammatical errors in one or more of the titles of a subject's supposed literary works, which would be highly atypical of prominent scientists, explorers and adventurers.

=== Authorship ===
Joseph Cantillion identified the author of "phantom Jesuit" articles as William Christian Tenner: he identified 43 wholly fictitious subjects in this genre, as well as a mostly fictitious biography of Ferrer, and presented a list of 94 fictitious entries. Dobson suggests Hermann Ritter, who appears as the source of "Articles on South and Central Americans" beginning with volume III, as another likely author of the fictitious articles.

Dobson notes that the first two volumes, where Juan G. Puron appears in this role, are practically free of fictitious articles, although he identified articles on "Dávila, Nepomuceno", "Chel-Ab-Ku-Kil", "Chignavitcelut" and "Oxiquieb Chiguaihue" as suspicious.

In Dobson's 1993 study of Appleton's, he found four articles in the letter I to be fictitious.

Articles on "Ingulf von Köln, Rudolf" (listed as suspicious by Dobson) and "Zénon de Rouvroy, Charles-Albert" (sometimes mentioned as "de Rouvroy, Charles-Albert Zénon") were found by Williams in 2021 to be fictitious.

Contributors to Appletons' Cyclopædia were free to suggest new subjects and were paid according to the length of the article, with articles only being checked for form by the editorial staff. While conceding that Appletons' Cyclopædia was a "valuable and authoritative work", and that her results should not reflect on the many authentic articles, Schindler noted that articles on Latin American subjects should be used cautiously until verified against other sources.

== Precedents ==
Appletons' Cyclopædia incorporated Francis S. Drake's Dictionary of American Biography (not to be confused with the more comprehensive 20th century Dictionary of American Biography). Drake's Dictionary was published in 1872 with 10,000 biographies. He worked on a second edition but died in 1885 without completing it. His first edition, original material, latest corrections, and all material he had gathered for the new edition were used in Appletons'.

== Editions ==
The first edition of the Cyclopædia was published between 1887 and 1889 by D. Appleton and Company of New York City. The general editors were James Grant Wilson and John Fiske; the managing editor from 1886 to 1888 was Rossiter Johnson. A seventh volume, containing an appendix and supplementary lists, and thematic indexes to the whole work, was issued in 1901.

The Cyclopædia was republished, uncorrected, by the Gale Research Company in 1968.

== See also ==
- The National Cyclopaedia of American Biography
- Universal Cyclopaedia
