= Matoury =

Commune in French Guiana, France

- Commune
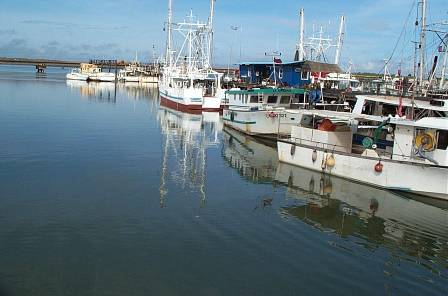
- A view of the port of Larivot in Matoury

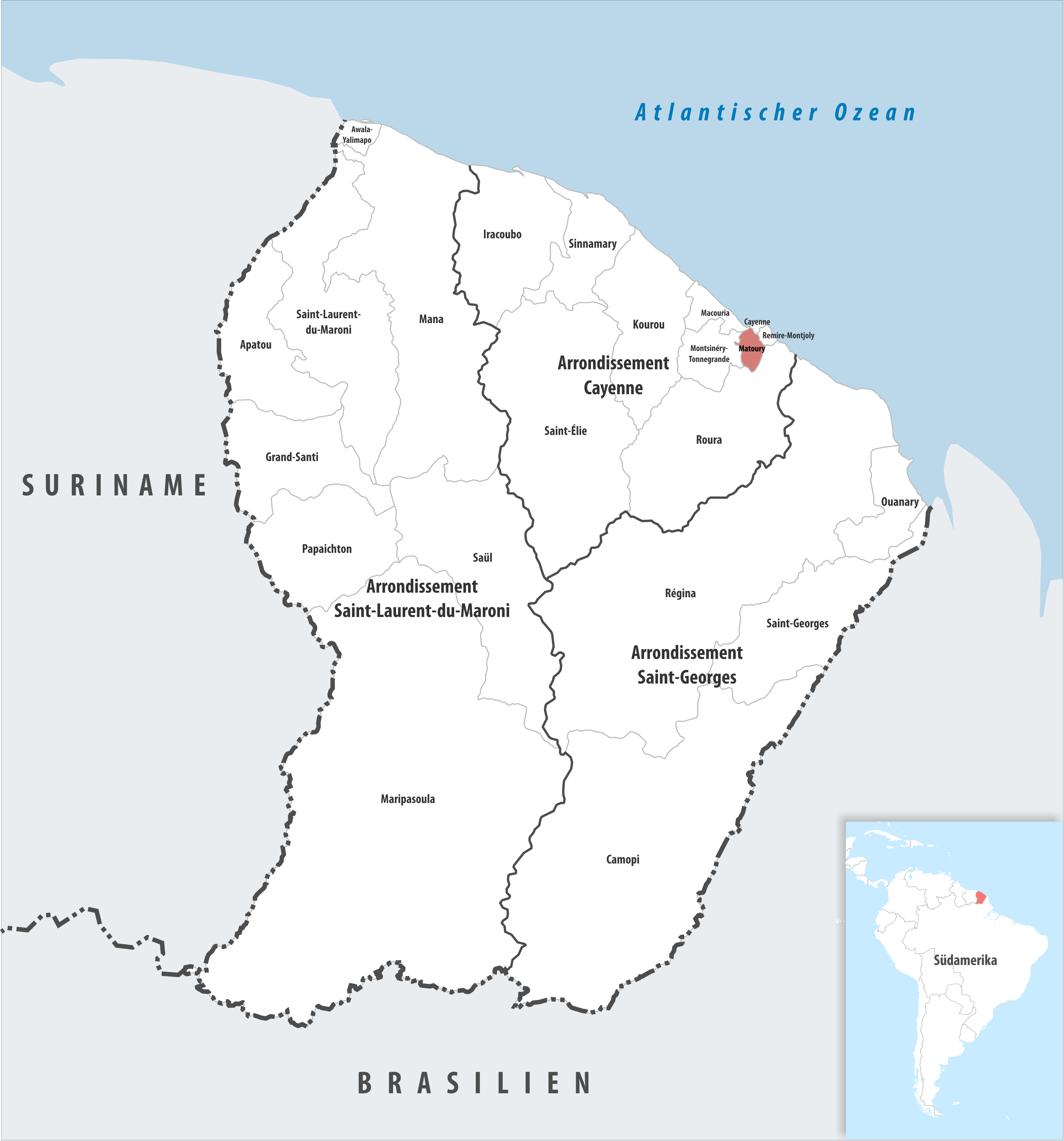
- Location of the commune (in red) within French Guiana
- Location of Matoury
- Coordinates: 4°50′50″N 52°19′52″W
- Country: France
- Overseas region and department: French Guiana
- Arrondissement: Cayenne
- Intercommunality: CA Centre Littoral

Government
  - Mayor (2020–2026): Serge Smock
- Area^{1}: 137.19 km^{2} (52.97 sq mi)
- Highest elevation: 234 m (768 ft)
- Lowest elevation: 0 m (0 ft)
- Population (2023): 36,512
  - Density: 266.14/km^{2} (689.30/sq mi)
- Time zone: UTC−03:00
- INSEE/Postal code: 97307 /97351
- ^{1} French Land Register data, which excludes lakes, ponds, glaciers > 1 km^{2} (0.386 sq mi or 247 acres) and river estuaries.

Matoury (French pronunciation: [matuʁi]; French Guianese Creole: Matouri) is a commune of French Guiana, an overseas region and department of France located in South America.

Matoury is a southern suburb of Cayenne, the préfecture and largest city of French Guiana. Cayenne – Félix Eboué Airport, the main international airport of French Guiana, is located in the commune of Matoury.

== Geography ==
=== Location ===
Matoury is located in French Guiana situated in South America. It is bordered by 5 communes:

- Cayenne in the North
- Rémire-Montjoly in the North-East
- Roura in the East, South-East and South
- Montsinéry-Tonnegrande in the West
- Macouria in the North-West

The city used to be called "Tour de l'Isle" because it is bordered by water :

- Fouillé inlet ( in French "Crique Fouillée") is the limit both with Cayenne and Rémire-Montjoly
- The river Mahury and the southern part of the river Tour de l'Île are the border with Roura
- The Northern part of the river Tour de l'Île and the southern part of the Cayenne river are the boundary with Montsinéry-Tonnegrande
- The Northern part of the Cayenne river is the limit with Macouria

=== Town planning ===
The town planning of Matoury is very uneven. Outside the town-centre there are some urbanized areas along the road leading to Cayenne, Macouria and Cayenne – Félix Eboué Airport. PROGT, the professional lyceum in Balata is surrounded by forests. The city is urbanizing quickly as a suburb of Cayenne

The main neighbourhoods of Matoury are:

- Copaya and Barbadine in the town-centre
- Concorde near the Félix Eboué airport
- Larivot next to the Larivot harbour
- Chemin de la Levée
- Stoupan and Degrad on the river Mahury
- Sainte-Rose-de-Lima
- Balata
- Cogneau-Larivot
- La Chaumière

== Population ==
The commune of Matoury experienced a rapid suburbanisation in the late 20th century, and grew from 567 people in 1967 to 36,512 in 2023.

Historical population
Year	Pop.	±% p.a.
1961	517	—
1967	567	+1.55%
1974	1,133	+10.40%
1982	2,532	+10.57%
1990	10,152	+18.96%
1999	18,032	+6.59%
2007	24,893	+4.11%
2012	29,712	+3.60%
2017	31,956	+1.47%
2023	36,512	+2.25%
Source: SPLAF and INSEE (1967-2023)

Matoury is a cosmopolitan town. It is home to Amerindians (located in Sainte-Rose-de-Lima, Cécilia and Petit-la-Chaumière), to Afro–French Guianans, Metropolitans, Haïtians, Brazilians, Surinamese, Javanese, Chinese, Maroon and people from British West Indies such as Saint Lucia.

== History ==
In 1838, during the colonial era, the District of Matoury was the third of the French Guiana colony thanks to its large and diversely cultivated areas. The main productions were sugarcane, cotton, clove, achiote and pepper.

Matoury is also home to remains of the past:

- The Trio fort situated in the Levée location was designed by Vauban and was used to protect the Cayenne Isle, conjointly with the Cépérou and Diamant forts (in Cayenne and Rémire-Montjoly).
- The Macaye-Duchassis habitation which used to be a cacao and sugar plantation|
- The Lamirande manufacture in Lamirande, next to the PROGT, which used produced sugar and rum between 1927 and 1950.

A new Hôtel de Ville (town hall) was built in the town in around 1980.

== Administration ==
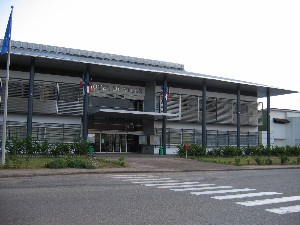
The Hôtel de Ville

Gabriel Serville was Mayor of the city between 2014 and 2020, and deputy to the French National Assembly since 2012.

== Nature ==
The Mirande trail is located in Matoury. The trail gives access to the Mont Grand Matoury Nature Reserve on the eponymous mountain.

== Notable people ==
- Alex Éric (1990), footballer.

== See also ==
- Communes of French Guiana
