= Sépélu =

Seventeenth century Kali'na chief

Sépélu (or Cépérou in French) was a seventeenth-century indigenous Kali'na chief, or yopoto, in what is now French Guiana. Oral histories recount that he sold or ceded land to the French circa 1643, namely the hill of Fort Cépérou which is now named after him. He is also remembered a native leader who resisted colonisation.

In 2003, Christiane Taubira held a competition to rename the international airport in Cayenne. Its previous namesake, Rochambeau, was deemed unfit because his son, Donatien-Marie-Joseph de Vimeur, had brutally attempted to quell the Haitian Revolution. Four schoolchildren won Taubira's competition with the name Sépélu. However, the airport was eventually named after Black colonial official Félix Éboué in 2012.
