= Communauté d'agglomération du Centre Littoral =

Centre Littoral
- Communauté d'agglomération
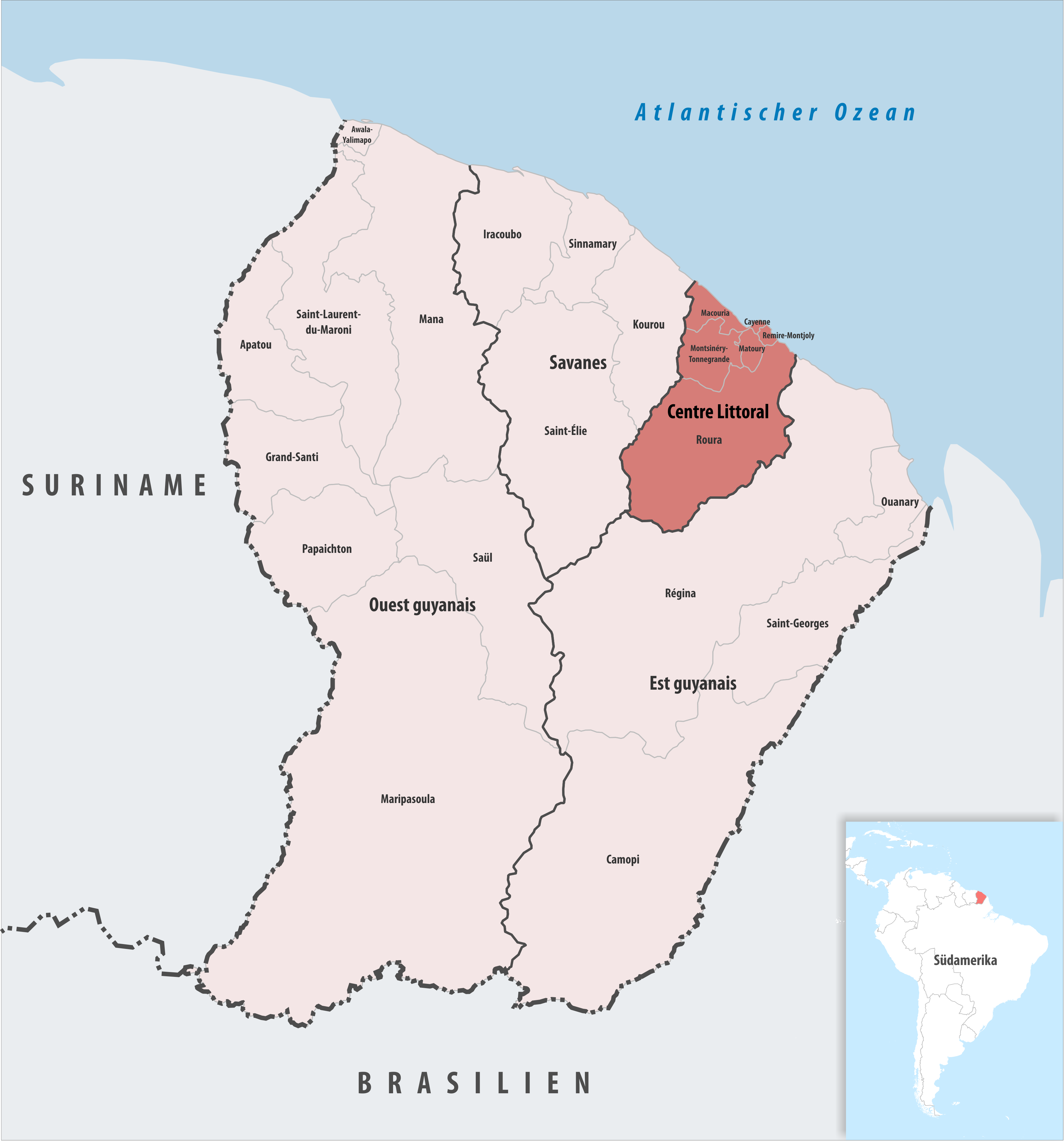
- Location within the department
- Country: France
- Overseas region and department: French Guiana{{{region}}}
- No. of communes: {{{nbcomm}}}
- Established: 2012
- Area: 5,086.9 km^{2} (1,964.1 sq mi)
- Population (2017): 138,920
  - Density: 27.309/km^{2} (70.731/sq mi)
- Website: www.cacl-guyane.fr

Communauté d'agglomération du Centre Littoral is an intercommunal structure, centred on the city of Cayenne. It is located in the French Guiana overseas department and region of France. It was created in January 2012. Its seat is in Cayenne, but its office is in Matoury. Its area is 5086.9 km^{2}. Its population was 138,920 in 2017, of which 61,268 in Cayenne proper.

== Composition ==
The communauté d'agglomération consists of the following 6 communes:

1. Cayenne
2. Macouria
3. Matoury
4. Montsinéry-Tonnegrande
5. Remire-Montjoly
6. Roura

All are part of the Arrondissement of Cayenne.
