= Hôtel de Ville, Matoury =

Town hall in Matoury, French Guiana

Hôtel de Ville
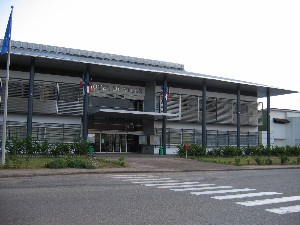
- The main frontage of the Hôtel de Ville in April 2007
- Interactive map of the Hôtel de Ville area

General information
- Type: City hall
- Architectural style: Modern style
- Location: Matoury, French Guiana
- Coordinates: 4.8505°N 52.3314°W
- Completed: c. 1980

The Hôtel de Ville (French pronunciation: [otɛl də vil], City Hall) is a municipal building in Matoury, French Guiana, on the northern coast of South America, standing on Rue Victor Ceide.

== History ==
In the late 1860s, as the village of Tour-de-L'Isle started to expand, civic leaders decided to commission a church, a school and a town hall. The site they selected for the town hall was on the south side of what is now Rue Victor Ceide. The building was designed in the Creole style, built using timber framing techniques and was completed in 1870. The design involved a symmetrical main frontage of four bays facing onto the street. It featured covered verandas on both floors. The outer bays on the first floor were fenestrated by casement windows with shutters, and there were sloping roofs projected out from both floors, designed to discharge large quantities of rain in the wet season.

After the commune of Matoury was established in 1891, the new town council led by the mayor, Jules Eglantin, decided to restore the town hall at a cost of FFr 15,000 in the same style: the works were completed in around 1907. After the old town hall was no longer required for municipal use, it served as a bank and a post office, and subsequently became the local police station before accommodating the local tourist office.

After significant population growth, largely associated with the Port of Larivot, the council led by the mayor, Raoul Roumillac, decided to commission a modern town hall. The site they selected was on the north side of Rue Victor Ceide facing the old town hall. The new building was designed on the modern style, built in steel and glass and was completed in around 1980. The design involved a symmetrical main frontage of seven bays facing onto the street. The central bay featured a glass doorway surmounted by a canopy, and a series of plate glass windows surmounted by a entablature on the first floor. The other bays were fenestrated by casement windows with were protected by metal grills on the ground floor and by slats on the first floor. The bays were separated by steel columns which supported a sloping roof which projected out. Internally, the principal room was the Salle du Conseil (council chamber).

A war memorial, in the form of a statue of a local soldier, was unveiled by the mayor, Serge Smock, in front of the town hall on 11 November 2023. The solder depicted was Louis-Gustave Fayde who died serving with the 4th Colonial Infantry Regiment at Vaucluse in February 1917 during the First World War.
