= Mont Grand Matoury Nature Reserve =

Protected area in French Guiana

- IUCN category IV (habitat/species management area)
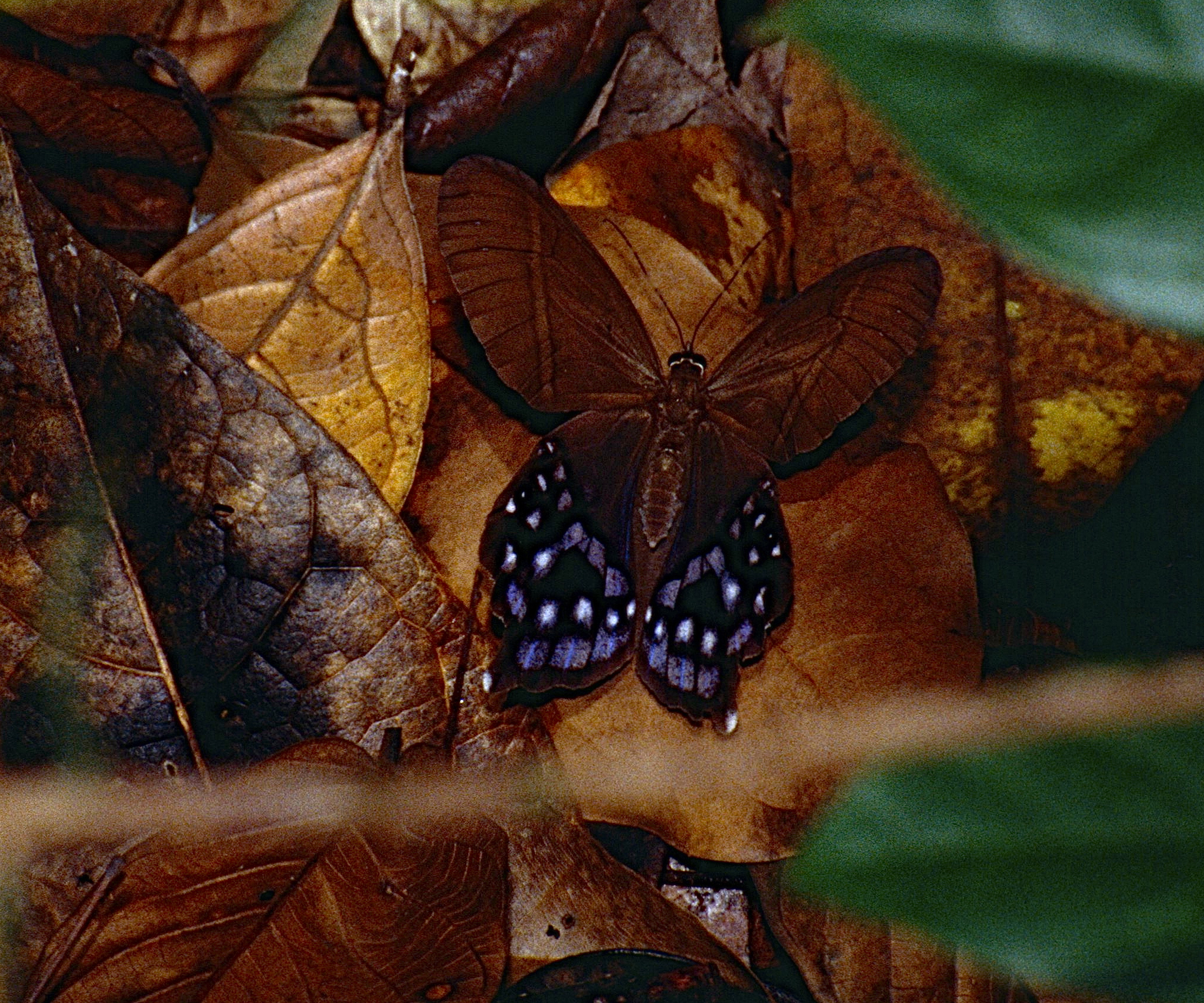
- Pierella hyalinus

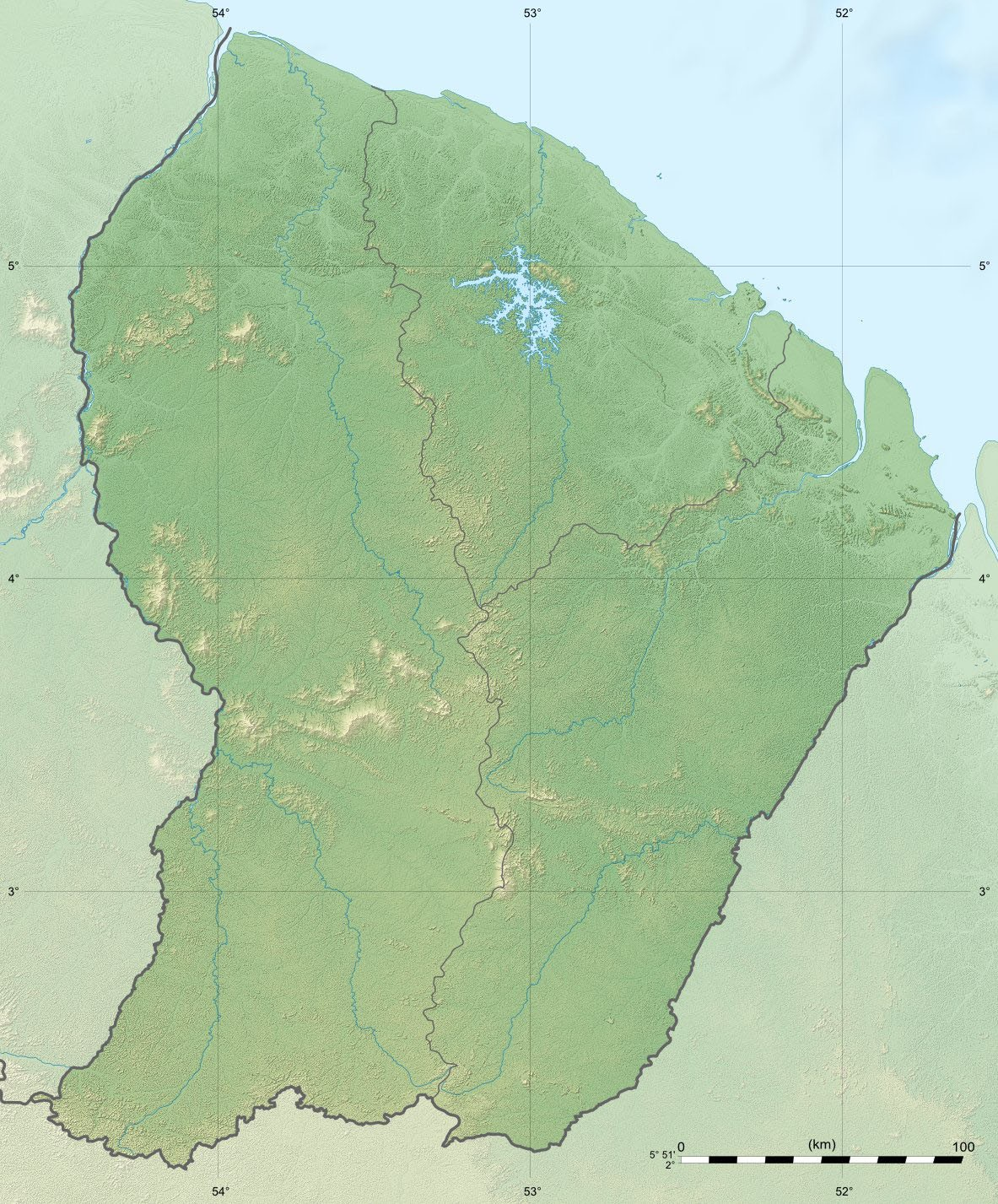
- Location within French Guiana
- Location: French Guiana, France
- Nearest city: Matoury
- Coordinates: 4.8637°N 52.3565°W
- Area: 21.23 km^{2} (8.20 sq mi)
- Established: 6 September 2006
- Governing body: National Forests Office
- Website: Reserves-Naturelles.org (in French)

The Mont Grand Matoury Nature Reserve (French: Réserve naturelle nationale du mont Grand Matoury) is a nature reserve in French Guiana, France. The reserve is located about eight kilometres south of Cayenne in the commune of Matoury It has been named after the eponymous mountain which measures 234 metres (768 ft), It was first protected in 1942, and extended in 2006.

== Overview ==
The nature reserve is located at a spot where many different environments meet. The lowlands of the coast with mangrove forests meet the old-growth forests of the highland. Numerous creeks flow through the area, and the reserve is surrounded by swamps and savannahs.

In 1942, an area of 166 hectares (410 acres) around the mountain was designated as a nature reserve. The Mirande trail gives access to the mountain. The visitor can either follow a botanical circuit or a more sportive hiking trail. On 6 September 2006, the area was incorporated in the current 2,123-hectare (5,250-acre) reserve.

== Flora and fauna ==
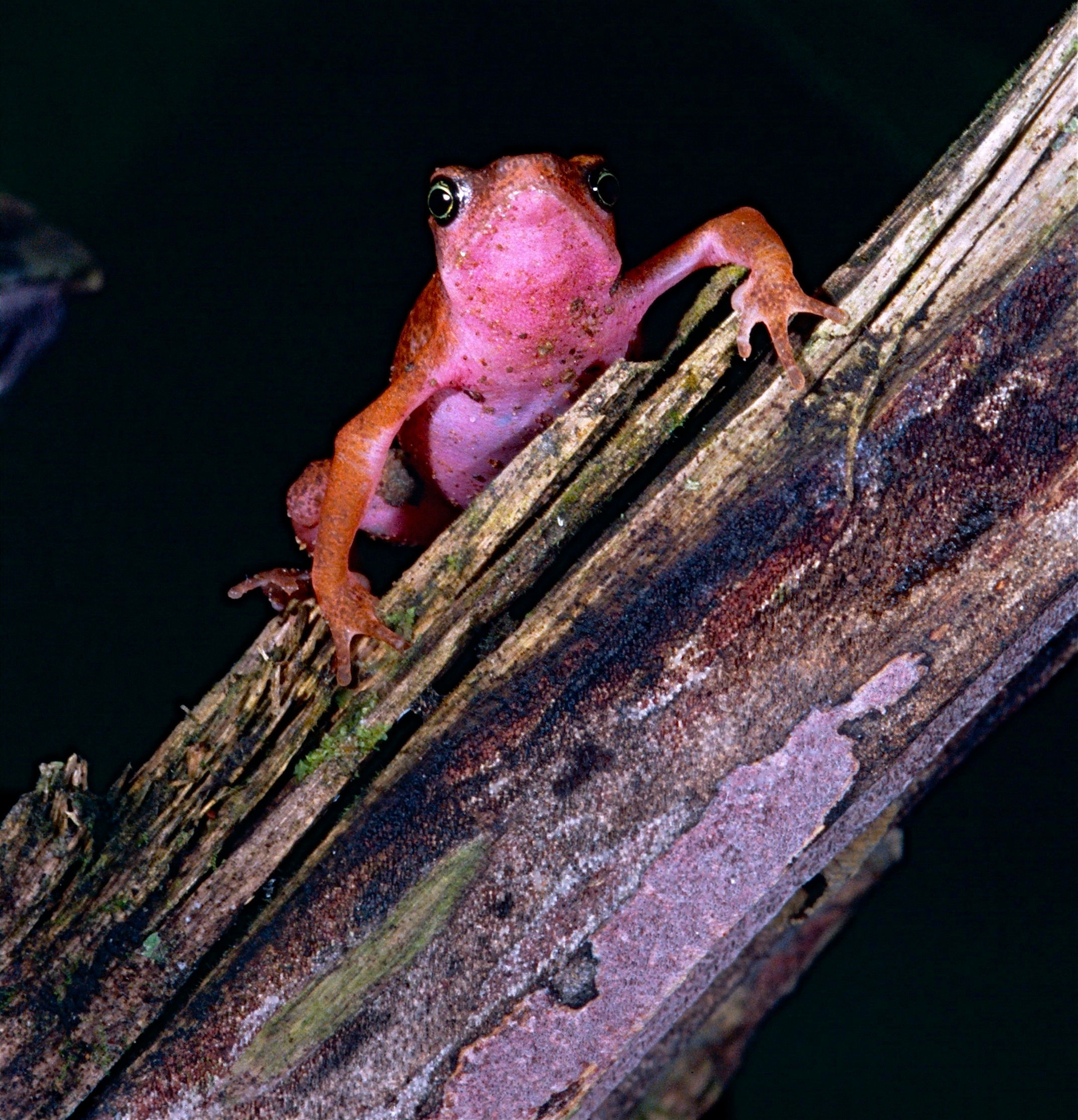
Cayenne stubfoot toad in Mont Grand Matoury

Mont Grand Matoury Nature Reserve is home to a great variety of wildlife. 75 species of mammals including 37 bats have been identified, 293 species of birds, and 351 species of butterflies are home to the area. Birds in the reserve include the roadside hawk, crane hawk, smooth-billed ani, hummingbirds, and the Amazonian motmot.

The palm Astrocaryum minus was first described by Trail in 1877, and assumed lost. In 1995, the palm was rediscovered at Mont Grand Matoury, and is nowadays considered a distinct species. The reserve is also home to a pre-Columbian Amerindian site.
