= French Guiana Zoo =

Zoo in French Guiana

- Zoo de Guyane
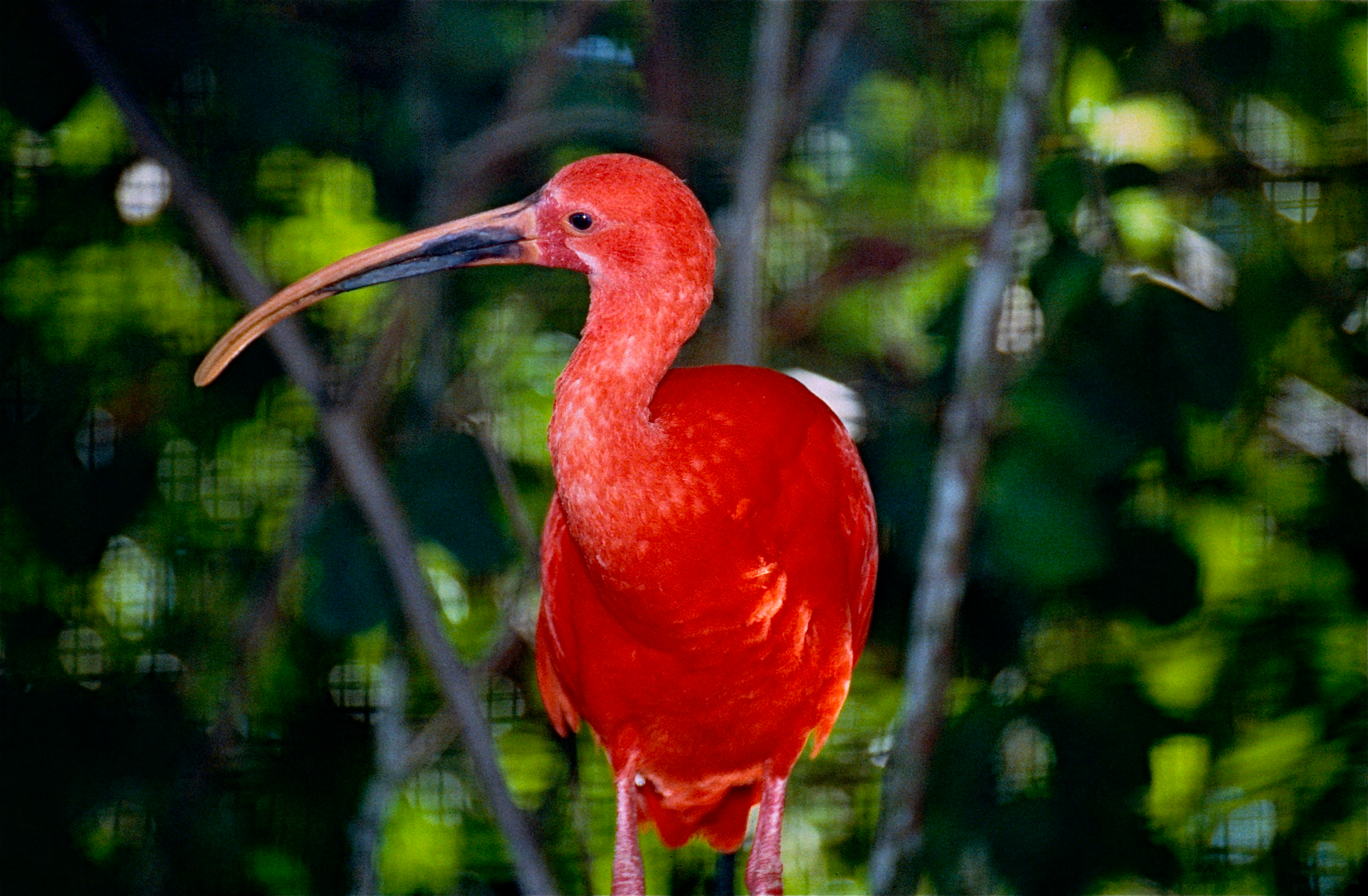
- Scarlet Ibis
- Interactive map of French Guiana Zoo
- 4.9480°N 52.4923°W
- Date opened: 1983
- Location: Macouria, French Guiana, France
- Land area: 12 hectares
- No. of animals: 240 (2021)
- No. of species: 56 (2021)
- Annual visitors: 44,000 (2013)
- Memberships: European Association of Zoos and Aquaria (EAZA); French Association of Zoological Parks (AFdPZ); Asociación Latinoamericana de Parques Zoológicos y Acuarios (ALPZA)
- Website: zoodeguyane.com

The French Guiana Zoo (French: Zoo de Guyane or Zoo-refuge de Guyane) is a zoo in French Guiana. It is located between Macouria and Montsinéry. Originally opened in 1983 as a hummingbird breeding centre, the zoo is a major tourist destination of French Guiana. The zoo is open for visitors every day of the week, including during public holidays.

== History ==
In 1983, Rudolf Watshinger founded Fauna Flora Amazonica, a hummingbird breeding center. In 1985, it was transformed into a wildlife park under the name Réserve Animalière Macourienne. In 2002, the wildlife park was purchased by the communes of Macouria and Montsinéry.

Due to its age and the need to meet safety standards, the zoo was closed in 2007. Franck and Angélique Chaulet, entrepreneurs who had previous bought and refurbished Zoo de Guadeloupe and Jardin de Balata, bought the zoo, and it was reopened in 2008 as Zoo de Guyane. Under their leadership, the zoo was renovated to meet accreditation standards for the European Association of Zoos and Aquaria (EAZA).

In 2013, the zoo was the second most visited attraction in French Guiana after the Salvation Islands. In 2014, the zoo built a new aviary named after the naturalist Eugène Bellony who in the 1930s opened the first animal park in what is now French Guiana. The aviary's first inhabitants were 40 rainbow lorikeets.

In the early morning of 6 May 2026, a group of four individuals broke into the zoo by cutting through the zoo's fence near the tapir enclosure. Camopi, a female tapir at the zoo, was greatly distressed; after the disappearance of her newborn calf, zoo staff feared the calf had been stolen. The calf was recovered safely later that day, having been hidden in the vegetation of its enclosure (likely by its own mother). This was the third in a rash of security incidents at the zoo; an unsuccessful attempt was made to steal a male tapir in early 2026 and a snake was successfully stolen from the zoo in September 2025. The zoo announced plans to further strengthen its security measures.

== Animals and exhibits ==
The collection of the zoo includes several species of monkeys, sloths, anteaters, harpy eagles, caimans, and a large collection of birds. There is a treetop path through the canopy for children. A commemorative plaque in honor of pioneering naturalist Eugène Bellony is on display in the zoo's tropical greenhouse.

Papy, a male jaguar, was a longtime resident of the zoo until his death on 11 August 2023 at the age of approximately 30; his lifespan exceeded the typical jaguar life expectancy, which is 10 to 12 years in the wild and around 23 years in captivity. His body was transported to the Pasteur Institute in French Guiana for an autopsy and further research. He was survived by Tama, the zoo's female jaguar.

The zoo is an active participant in the EAZA Ex-situ Programme. The zoo also contains a care and rescue center for local wildlife, which are rehabilitated and released whenever possible.

== Gallery ==
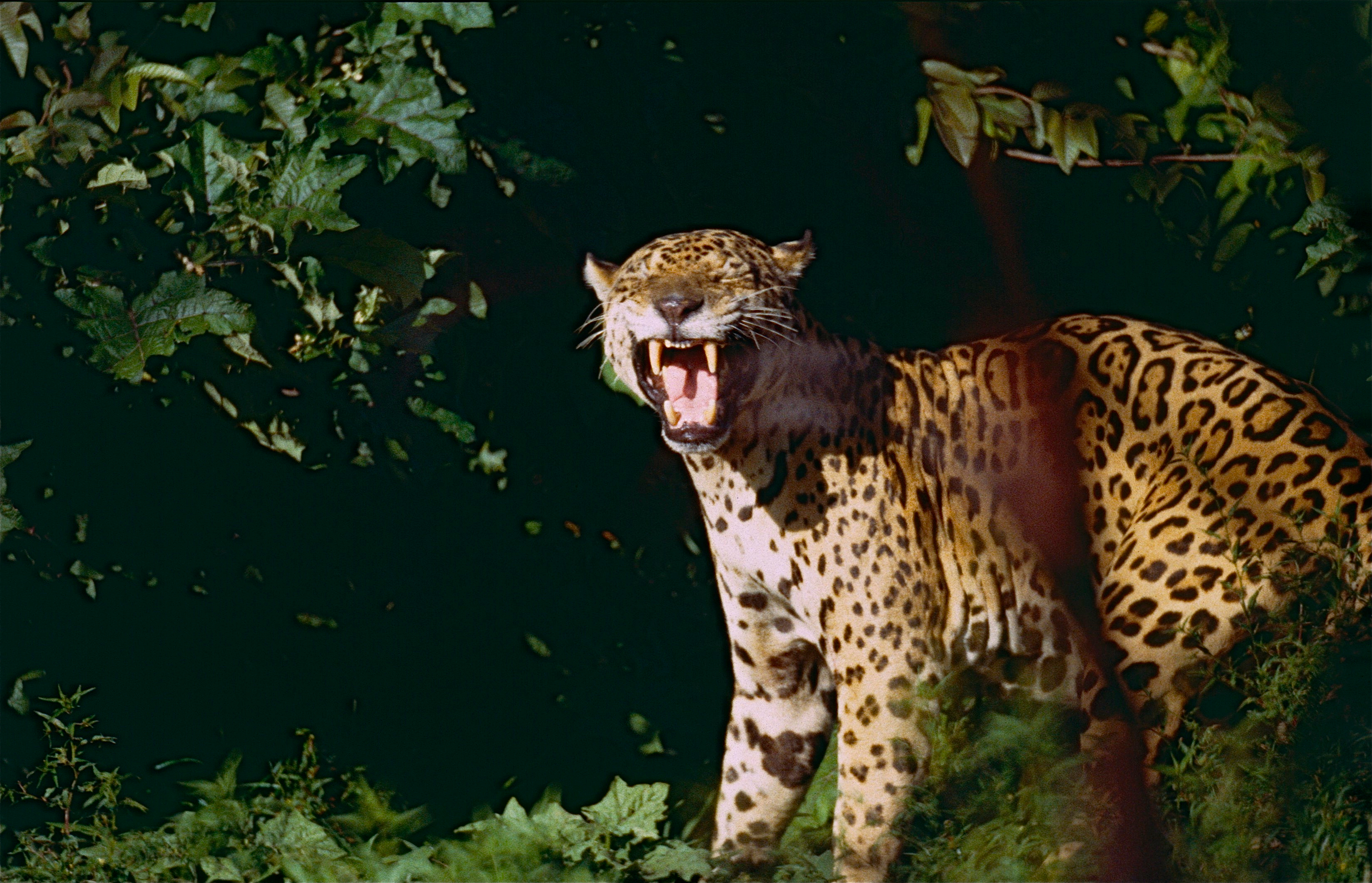
Jaguar

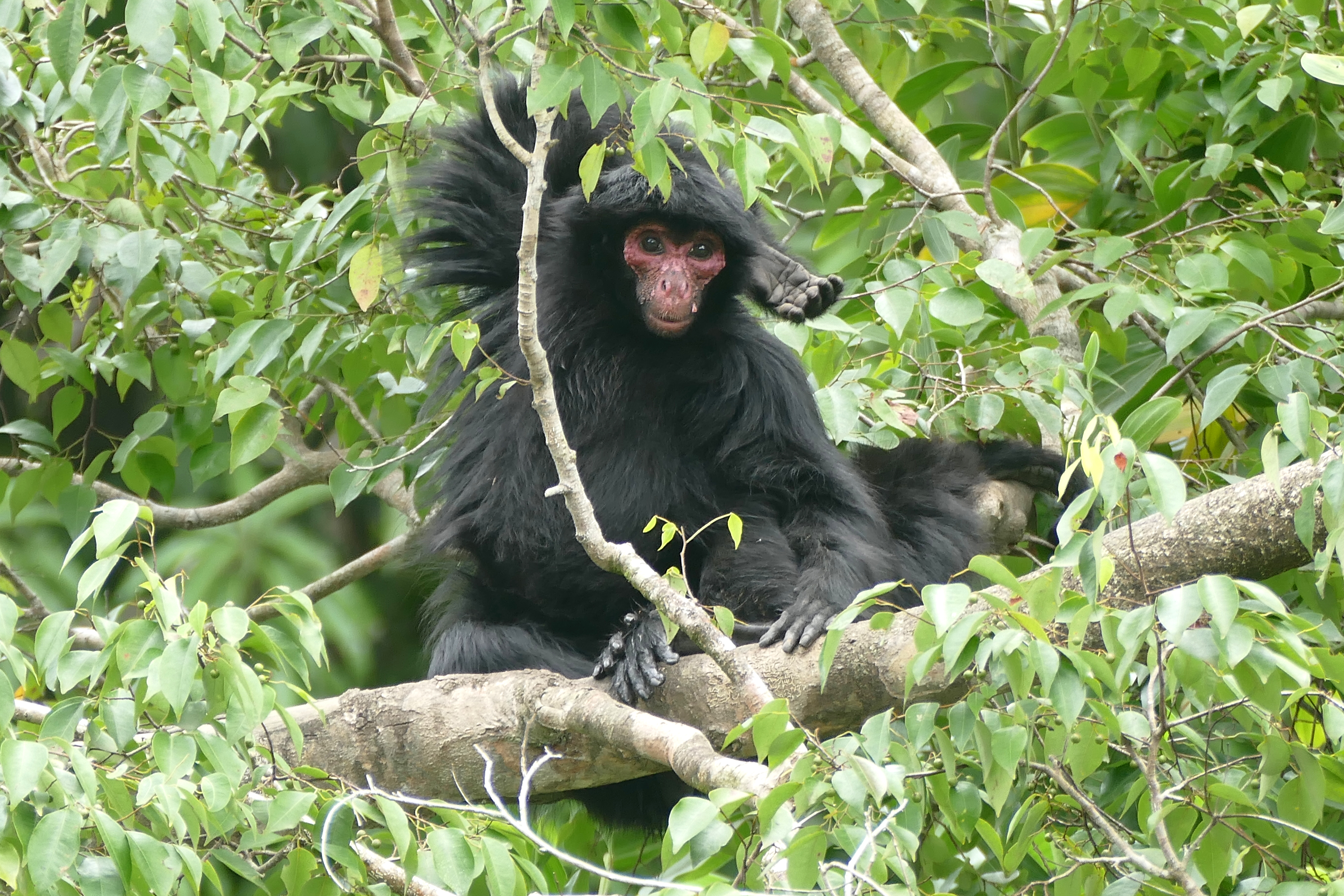
Red-faced spider monkey

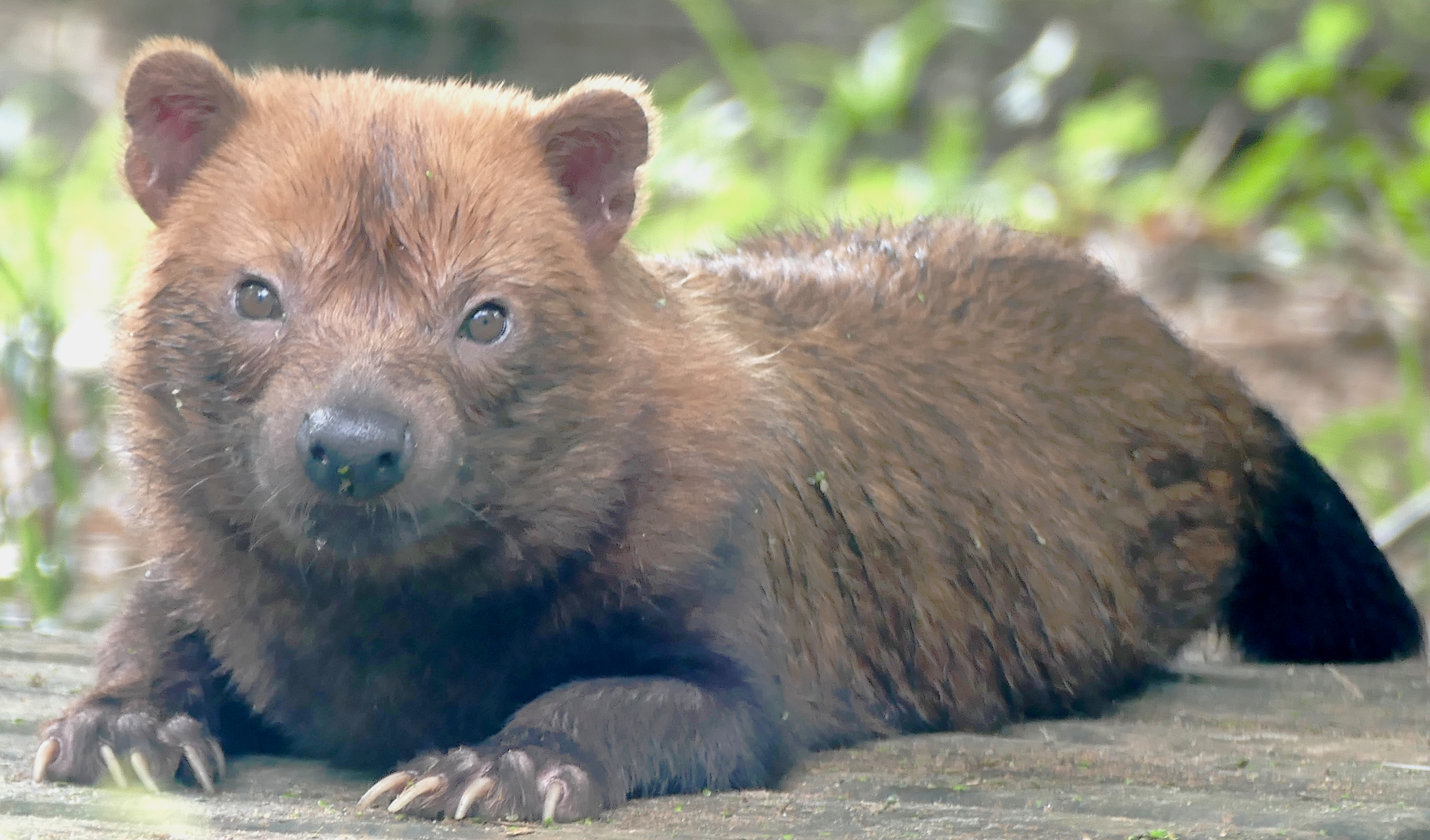
Bush dog

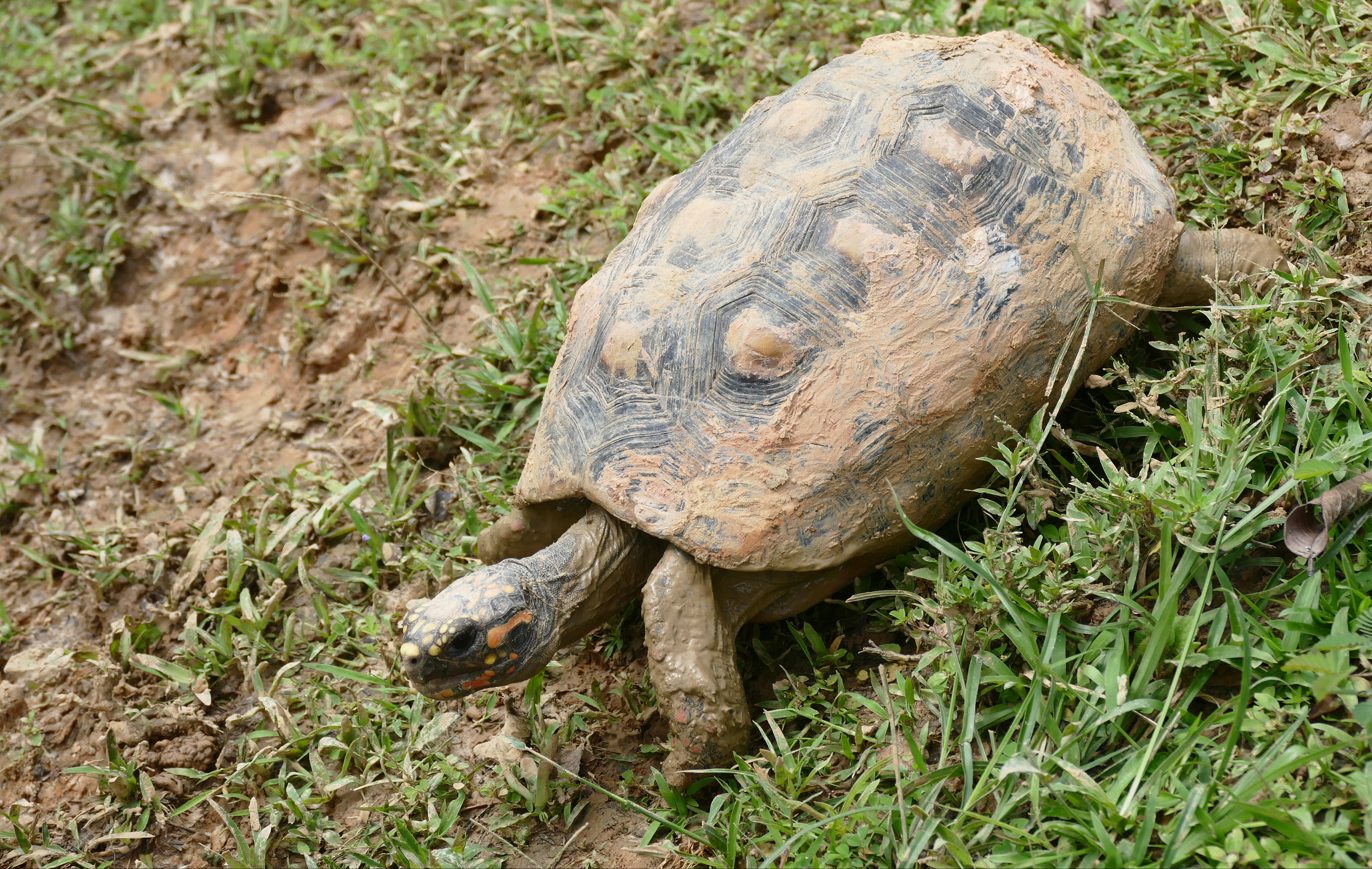
Red-footed tortoise
