= Farnous =

- Village
- Location in French Guiana
- Coordinates: 4°57′0″N 52°25′0″W
- Country: France
- Overseas region: French Guiana
- Arrondissement: Cayenne
- Commune: Macouria

Farnous is a village in French Guiana, located in the arrondissement of Cayenne on the Route nationale 1 (RN1) about 19 kilometres west of Cayenne. Since the mid-2000s, it has undergone urban development and has been designated as a key site for public infrastructure, including a gendarmerie station and a municipal waste collection centre.

== Geography and location ==
Farnous is located in the Arrondissement of Cayenne, on the Route nationale 1 (RN1) between Macouria and Cayenne, 19km west of Cayenne, the capital of French Guiana.

== Urban planning and development ==
Between 2005 and 2015, Farnous experienced substantial land development as part of a major urban expansion on the eastern side of the commune. Officially designated as an urban zone (Zone U/UD) under the local urban plan, the sector currently features low-density, single-family detached homes (five to ten units per hectare) mixed with local activities, all while maintaining a highly vegetative landscape of large gardens and natural spaces. Future municipal planning aims to expand this urban hub in a controlled manner, utilising a planned secondary road parallel to the Route nationale 1 (RN1) to connect neighbouring sectors, alleviate highway congestion, and eventually facilitate public transit links to future river and sea stations at Soula and Pointe Liberté.

== Infrastructure ==
Farnous's central location and immediate proximity to the Route nationale 1 (RN1) highway make it the commune's priority site for critical public interest facilities. To directly address the high accident rate on the RN1, the town is leveraging this strategic positioning to build a centralised safety and security hub featuring a new gendarmerie station. Additionally, the village's accessible location will be used to improve regional waste management through the construction of a new municipal waste collection center within the same complex.
