= Auxence Contout =

French writer (1925–2020)

- Born: 4 February 1925; Cayenne, French Guiana
- Died: 2 January 2020 (aged 94); Cayenne, French Guiana
- Years active: Writer

Auxence Contout (4 February 1925 – 2 January 2020) was a French writer who was from French Guiana.

== Biography ==
In 1947, Contout left South America for Paris, where he studied science and mathematics at the University of Sorbonne Nouvelle Paris 3. After this, he began teaching mathematics. During his time in Paris, he founded the Union of Guianan Students. From 1954 to 1958, he taught mathematics at the Lycée de Douala in Cameroon. He returned to French Guiana in 1958 and taught mathematics at Lycée Félix Éboué in Cayenne. He became headmaster in 1968. In 1969, Contout was named principal at Collège République, where he served for 22 years. The college would be renamed after him in 2004.

Contout was passionate about Guianan culture, history, language, and folklore. He wrote numerous tales and poems in Creole, many of which have been published by the Matoury-based publisher Ibis Rouge Editions. He also participated in many sporting and cultural events. He helped start La Ligue de Handball de Guyane. Contout served in important functions for the French Guiana Honor Division. He served as President of the French Economic, Social and Environmental Council from 1975 to 1983 and later led the Culture, Education and Environment Council.

Contout was a Commander of the Ordre national du Mérite and was President of the Association of the Ordre national du Mérite de Guyane.

Auxence died on 2 January 2020 at the age of 94 in Cayenne.

== Works ==
- Le Patois guyanais (1973)
- Langues et cultures guyanaises (1987)
- La Guyane des proverbes (1995)
- Le parler guyanais (1996)
- Le petit dictionnaire de la Guyane classé par thèmes, avec histoires de mots, tournures et conversations (1996)
- Guyane au sein de l’incertitude (1999)
- La Guyane : ses contes, ses devinettes, ses croyances, ses monuments (1999)
- Vaval, l’histoire du carnaval de la Guyane française (2000)
- Contes et légendes de Guyane (2003)
- Guyane d’hier et d’avant-hier (2010)

== Honors ==
The collège République de Cayenne was renamed collège Auxence Contout in tribute to Contout servitude as Principal at the school for 22 years.
