= Guerin Spranger =

Daniel Guerin Spranger

Commander of Cayenne
- In office 1656 – 15 May 1664
- Preceded by: Huet de Navarre
- Succeeded by: Antoine Lefèbvre de La Barre

Personal details
- Born: c. 1610
- Died: After 1676
- Occupation: Colonist

Daniel Guerin Spranger, or Quijrijn Spranger, Gerrit Spranger (born c. 1610) was a Dutch Jewish entrepreneur who was the commander of the colony of Cayenne, now in French Guiana, between 1656 and 1664. The island of Cayenne had earlier been abandoned by the French. Spranger established good relations with the indigenous people and founded plantations of sugarcane and other tropical plants. In 1664 the French returned in force, and Spranger ceded the colony on the best terms he could get. In 1676 the Dutch again captured Cayenne, and later that year the French again regained control. Spranger seems to have been among the Dutch prisoners shipped back to France in 1676.

== Life ==
=== Early years (1610–56) ===
Daniel Guerin Spranger was born in Holland around 1610. He obtained a contract to provide supplies to the army of Maurice de Nassau in the conquest of Brazil, and spent sixteen year in Dutch Brazil engaged in colonization schemes. He developed extensive trade between Brazil and Amsterdam. When the Portuguese army recovered possession of Brazil in 1654 all the Jews, Portuguese and Dutch, were expelled from the country.

=== Cayenne (1656–64) ===
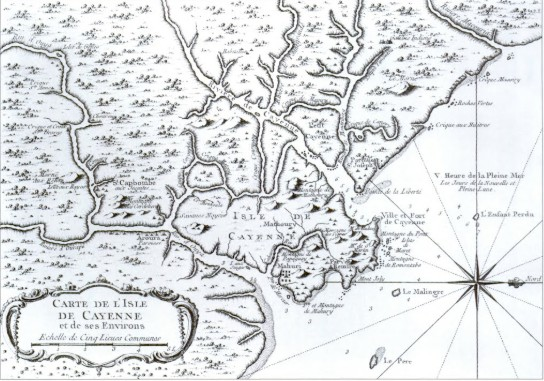
Map of the Island of Cayenne and its surroundings in 1729. North to the right.

Spranger obtained a grant from the States General of the Netherlands and established a Dutch colony on Cayenne Island around 1656. (Note: Some sources say Spranger founded the Cayenne colony in 1656, while others give 1657.) Spranger found that the French had abandoned the island. (Note: In September 1652 the twelve seigneurs of the Compagnie de la France équinoxiale landed 800 men at the tip of the Pointe du Mahury, where they found the 25 survivors of the Compagnie de Rouen. Jean de Laon, a king' engineer, replaced the wooden walls of Fort Cépérou with a stone bastion called Fort Saint Michel. However, all of the settlers had soon been killed by the Caribs or had escaped to Barbados.) The Jews brought slaves with them, established friendly relations with the indigenous people, and began producing sugar for export. The colony came under the control of the Dutch West India Company. This company looked for suitable colonists, and in particular for Jewish settlers who had experience in tropical products. Several other groups of Jews from Brazil joined Spranger, who introduced sugar cane and indigo which proved very successful. According to Jacques Dutertre in his Histoire générale des Antilles, "under Spranger's administration, the island of Cayenne was reputed an El Dorado." In 1658 Spranger made an agreement for prospecting for minerals with commander Balthazar Gerbier, baron Douilly.

On 12 September 1659 David Nassy, a refugee from Dutch Brazil, was given a grant by the company's Amsterdam chamber for a Jewish colony separate from the colony around the city of Cayenne. The group of Jewish colonists, mostly refugees from Brazil but some from Amsterdam, were refused permission to disembark on Cayenne by the Protestant governor, Jan Classen Langedijk. He would only let them establish a colony in a swampy area on the mainland. There were about 35 Protestants on the island, who said they would leave the island when their term of service ended if the Portuguese Jews were refused land, since they would bring prosperity. The Indians also said they would welcome the Jews. The governor seems to have yielded to these arguments and allowed the newcomers to settle. The Jews settled in a fertile region named Remire or Irmire on the west of the island. They planted sugarcane, built a sugar mill, and also produced colours from indigo and annatto. They also produced vanilla extract. There was a fort at Remire, and apparently also a synagogue. In 1650 a group of 152 Jews from Livorno arrived, mostly poor people of North African origin.

=== French take-over (1664) ===
The plantations were established and Spranger had begun a profitable trade with the Netherlands when the French decided to regain control, despite being at peace with the Netherlands at the time. On 26 February 1664 Alexandre de Prouville de Tracy sailed from La Rochelle, France, with seven ships and 1,200 picked men of the Compagnie de la France équinoxiale. His first stop was in Cayenne, which Guerin Spranger as Dutch commander surrendered to him without opposition on 15 May 1664. Tracy disembarked the new French governor Antoine Lefèbvre de La Barre and his garrison, and left for Martinique. (Note: According to Appletons' Cyclopædia of American Biography (1900) Spranger died while defending the colony. This is patently incorrect given the surviving contract between Spranger, Tracy and de la Barre that sets out the terms for a peaceful handover.) Germán Arciniegas relates,

In the Antilles, among Dutch, French and English things are settled in a brotherly manner. Underneath the skin we are all humans. Guerin Spranger, a Dutchman, was once governor of Guyana, and the French fleet tried to seize the place. The Dutchman weighed up his forces, saw that it was useless to resist and proposes the Frenchmen to give him 21.850 guilder for his plantations. The guilder appeared and the province surrendered without firing one shot. It all happened on the white sheet of a cash book.(Arciniegas. p. 211).

An agreement between Spranger, de Tracy and de la Barre dated 15 March 1664 set out the terms of surrender. It recognized the Dutch rights to lands in the island, and to their guns, ammunition, merchandise, provisions and appurtenances. The French would let the Dutch military march out, drums beating, and would give them and all other inhabitants transport with their goods and slaves to their destination island or country, providing food and drink on the voyage. The inhabitants who remained, including the Jews, would have freedom of religion and full possession of their goods, lands and slaves. If they chose to leave they could sell their land and take their goods and slaves with them.

== Later career ==
One source says that Spranger moved from Cayenne to Suriname. It seems that some of the Dutch Jews and Protestants were transported to La Rochelle in Suriname, an outpost on the border with French Guiana, and from there some made their way to the "Jewish Savannah", where there is a region called Cajane (the Dutch form of Cayenne).

An undated letter survives from Maurice de Nassau to Godefroi, Comte d'Estrades, perhaps written around 1679. It says that when the French had taken Guiana they had made "Quyryn Spranger" a prisoner, and brought him to Brest. Maurice asked that he be given his freedom. His comrades had already been released, and he had nothing in the world but his sword. It seems unlikely that Spranger would have been imprisoned from 1664 to 1679. In May 1676 the Dutch under Jacob Binckes occupied Cayenne. The French under Count Jean II d'Estrées recovered the colony on 19 December 1676. The Dutch officers and about 260 colonists were taken as prisoners of war, and were probably taken to Brest. Probably Spranger was among this batch of prisoners.

== Sources ==
- Arbell, Mordehay (2002), The Jewish Nation of the Caribbean: The Spanish-Portuguese Jewish Settlements in the Caribbean and the Guianas, Gefen Publishing House Ltd, ISBN 978-965-229-279-7
- Bailey, Gauvin Alexander (2018-06-06), Architecture and Urbanism in the French Atlantic Empire: State, Church, and Society, 1604-1830, MQUP, ISBN 978-0-7735-5376-7
- Fortia, Marquis de (1834), Continuation de l'Art de vérifier les dates: Suite de ... l'Amérique. Guiane, Livre Premier. Tome Quinzième
- Les origines du Fort Cépérou et de la ville de Cayenne (in French), Mairie de Cayenne
- Martínez, Alida (10 February 2015), Narrations, Formality and Knowledge in the Maps (Catalogue in English and Spanish of The Prome Encuentro Bienal Arte Contemporaneo di Caribe, Aruba)
- Page, Melvin Eugene; Sonnenburg, Penny M. (2003), Colonialism: An International, Social, Cultural, and Political Encyclopedia, ABC-CLIO, ISBN 978-1-57607-335-3
- Southey, Robert (1819), History of Brazil, Longman, Hurst, Rees, and Orme
- Southey, Captain Thomas (1827), Chronological History of the West Indies, vol. I, London: Longman, Rees, Orme, Brown, & Green, ISBN 978-1-136-99066-3
- Van Panhuys, L. C. (1930–1931), "Quijrijn Spranger", De West-Indische Gids (in Dutch), 12, Brill on behalf of the KITLV, Royal Netherlands Institute of Southeast Asian and Caribbean Studies: 535–540, JSTOR 41847925
- Wilson, James Grant; Fiske, John, eds. (1900), "SPRANGER, Daniel Guerin", Appletons' Cyclopædia of American Biography, vol. V, New York: D. Appleton and company
