= Grand Audiencier of France =

High office under the french Ancien Régime

The Grand Audiencier (French: Grand Audiencier de France) was an office of the French monarchy under the Ancien Régime. He was the first officer of the Grand Chancellery of France.

== History ==
The Chief Court Clerk received all the letters which he had to bring back to the seal.

Contemporaneous records indicate that the Grand Audiencers were always above the King's Clerks, Notaries, and Secretaries (Secrétaire du roi) and enjoyed all the privileges of the latter.

The Grand Audienciers recorded in separate registers the grants awarded by the King, the prebends of Royal appointment, the indults, the privileges and permissions to print. For each item, the Keeper of the Seals wrote on the register, "sealed".

== See also ==
- Chancellor of France

== Bibliography ==
- Nicolas Viton de Saint-Allais : Dictionnaire encyclopédique de la noblesse de France — Paris, 1816
- Sous la direction de Diderot et d'Alembert : Encyclopédie ou Dictionnaire raisonné des sciences, des arts et des métiers.
