= Rivière de Cayenne =

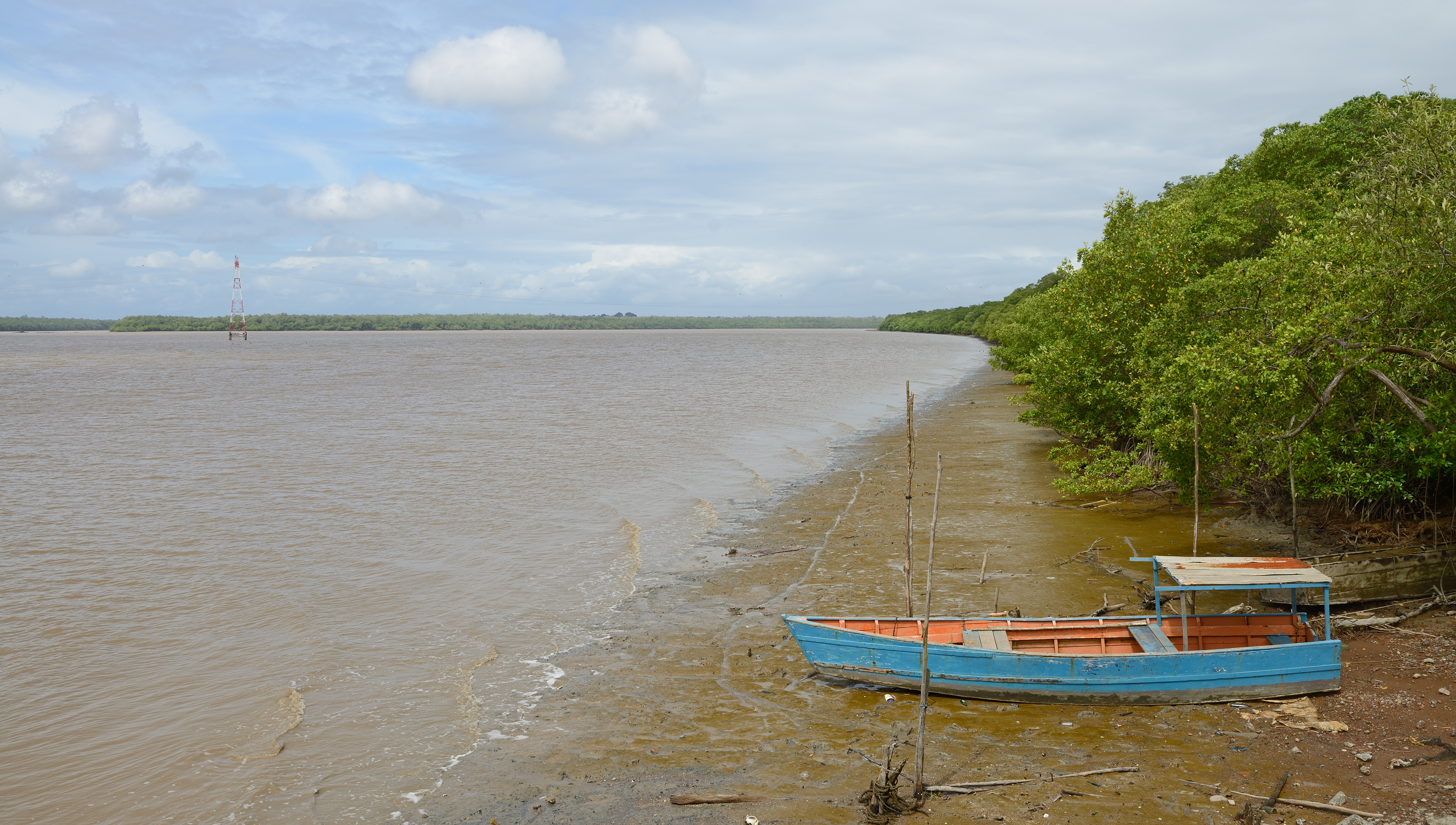

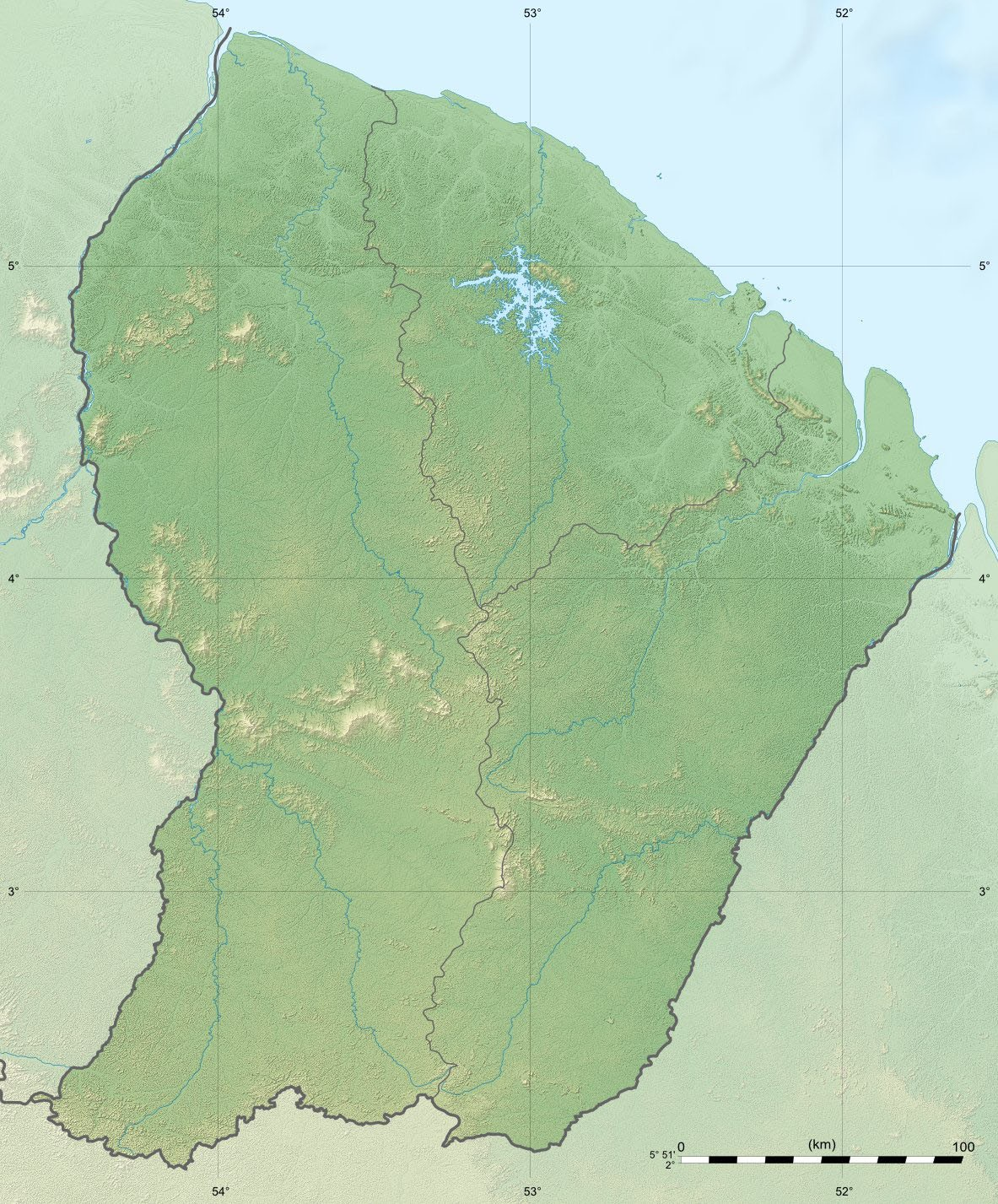
- Location of the mouth

Location
- Country: France
- Region: French Guiana

Physical characteristics
- Mouth: Atlantic Ocean
  - coordinates: 4°55′23″N 52°20′56″W
  - elevation: Sea level
- Length: 44 km (27 mi)

Basin features
- Tributaries
  - left: Tonnegrande, Montsinéry River
  - right: Rivière des Cascades

The Rivière de Cayenne (French pronunciation: [ʁivjɛʁ də kajɛn], "Cayenne River") is a river in French Guiana, formed by the Rivière des Cascades, Tonnegrande, and Montsinéry River. It flows into the Atlantic Ocean near the city of Cayenne, forming an estuary about 2 km long. It is 43.7 km (27.2 mi) long, including its upper course Rivière des Cascades.

The river featured prominently in both the movie and the book Papillon by Henri Charrière.

== See also ==
- List of rivers of French Guiana
- List of rivers of the Americas by coastline
