= List of colonial and departmental heads of French Guiana =

This article lists the colonial and departmental heads of French Guiana, since the establishment of the French suzerainty over the territory of French Guiana in 1643, to the present day. The colony was headed by a governor from 1809 until 1946, when the territory became an overseas department of France.

(Dates in italics indicate de facto continuation of office)

== Ancien régime ==
Term	Incumbent	Notes
French Suzerainty
French colony
1643 to 1644	Charles Poncet de Brétigny, Governor	
c. 1652	Huet de Navarre, Commander	
Dutch Occupation
c. 1656 to 1664	Guerin Spranger, Commander	
c. 1660	Jan Claessen Lagedijk or Jan Classen Langedijk, Governor	
French Suzerainty
15 May 1664 to 1665	Antoine Lefèbvre de La Barre, Governor	1st time
1665	Antoine de Noël de la Trompe d'Or, acting Governor	
1665 to 1668	Cyprien Lefebvre de Lézy, Governor	1st time
1668 to 1670	Antoine Lefèbvre de La Barre, Governor	2nd time
1670 to 1676	Cyprien Lefebvre de Lézy, Governor	2nd time
Dutch Occupation
5 May 1676 to December 1676	Jacob Binckes, Commander	
French Suzerainty
1676 to 1679	Cyprien Lefebvre de Lézy, Governor	3rd time
1679 to October 1684	Pierre-Eléonore de La Ville, marquis de Férolles, Governor	1st time
1684 to 1687	Pierre de Sainte-Marthe de Lalande, Governor	
1687 to 1688	Pierre-Eléonore de La Ville, marquis de Férolles, Governor	2nd time
1688 to 1691	François Lefebvre de la Barre, Governor	
1691 to January 1700	Pierre-Eléonore de La Ville, marquis de Férolles, Governor	3rd time
1700 to 1701	Rémy Guillouet d'Orvilliers, Governor	1st time
1701 to 5 August 1705	Pierre-Eléonore de La Ville, marquis de Férolles, Governor	4th time
1705 to 15 September 1706	Antoine de Querci de Rionville, Governor	
1706 to July 1713	Rémy Guillouet d'Orvilliers, Governor	2nd time
1713	Chevalier de Béthune, Governor	
1713 to September 1716	Pierre de Morthon de Laumière de Grandville, interim Governor	
1716 to December 1720	Claude Guillouet d'Orvilliers, Governor	1st time
1720 to 1722	François de la Motte-Aigron, Governor	
1722 to September 1729	Claude Guillouet d'Orvilliers, Governor	2nd time
1729 to June 1730	Michel Marshalek de Charanville, Governor	
1730 to 2 August 1730	Gilbert Guillouet d'Orvilliers, Governor	1st time
1730 to 30 August 1736	Henri Dussault de Lamirande, Governor	
1736 to December 1736	Henri de Poilvillain, baron de Grenay, Governor	
1736 to 9 July 1738	Gilbert Guillouet d'Orvilliers, Governor	2nd time
9 July 1738 to June 1743	Antoine Le Moyne de Chateauguay, Governor	
1743 to June 1751	Gilbert Guillouet d'Orvilliers, Governor	3rd time
1751 to May 1752	Jean Baptiste Hyacinthe de Saint-Michel Dunezat, Governor	1st time
1752 to July 1753	Gilbert Guillouet d'Orvilliers, Governor	4th time
1753 to April 1757	Jean Baptiste Hyacinthe de Saint-Michel Dunezat, Governor	2nd time
1757 to May 1763	Gilbert Guillouet d'Orvilliers, Governor	5th time
1763 to 2 January 1764	Jean Pierre Antoine de Béhague, Governor	1st time
1764 to 22 December 1764	Louis-Thomas Jacau de Fiedmont, Governor	1st time
22 December 1764 to April 1765	Brule Tout de Préfontaine, acting Governor	
April 1765 to 1765	Étienne-François Turgot, Governor	
1765 to 28 January 1766	Jean Pierre Antoine de Béhague, Governor	2nd time
1766 to 15 December 1781	Louis-Thomas Jacau de Fiedmont, Governor	2nd time
1781 to 13 July 1785	Alexandre Ferdinand, baron de Bessner, Governor	
1785 to 16 August 1785	Louis de La Vallière, interim Governor	
1785 to 17 May 1787	Thomas de FitzMaurice, Governor	
May 1787 to 22 October 1788	Pierre François de Mareuilh de Villeboi, Governor	
1788 to 19 June 1789	Charles Guillaume Vial d'Alais, Governor	
1789 to 5 January 1791	Jacques Martin de Bourgon, Governor	

== First Republic and Empire ==
Term	Incumbent	Notes
1791 to 26 September 1792	Henri Benoît, acting Governor	
1792 to May 1793	Frédéric Joseph Guillot, Civil Commissioner	
1793 to November 1794	Georges Nicolas Jeannet-Oudin, Civil Commissioner	1st time
November 1794 to April 1796	François Maurice Cointet de Fillain, Governor General	
April 1796 to 25 October 1797	Georges Nicolas Jeannet-Oudin, Agent Particulier	2nd time
French département
25 October 1797 to 5 November 1798	Georges Nicolas Jeannet-Oudin, Agent Particulier	2nd time
November 1798 to 2 December 1799	Étienne Laurent Pierre Burnel, Agent Particulier	
13 December 1799 to 8 January 1800	Étienne Franconie, President of the Departmental Administration	
8 January 1800 to 1801	Jean Baptiste Victor Hugues, Agent	
French colony
1801 to 1804	Jean Baptiste Victor Hugues, Agent	
1804 to 12 January 1809	Jean Baptiste Victor Hugues, Imperial Commissioner	
Portuguese Occupation
12 January 1809 to October 1809	Manuel Marques, Governor	
October 1809 to February 1812	Pedro Alexandrino Pinto de Sousa, Governor	
February 1812 to 8 November 1817	João Severiano Maciel da Costa, Governor	

== Bourbon Restoration and July Monarchy ==
Term	Incumbent	Notes
1817 to 25 July 1819	Jean-François Claude Carra de Saint-Cyr, Commandant	
25 July 1819 to 12 March 1823	Pierre Clément de Laussat, Commandant	
1823 to 1825	Pierre Bernard, baron de Milius, Commandant	
1825 to 1826	Charles Emmanuel de Muyssard, interim Commandant	
1826 to 1827	Joseph Burgues de Missiessy, interim Governor	
1827 to 1829	Louis Henri de Saulses de Freycinet, Governor	
1 June 1829 to 11 April 1836	Louis Jean-Guillaume Jubelin, Governor	
1836 to 1837	François Dominique Laurens de Choisy, Governor	
1837 to 1839	Paul de Nourquer du Camper, Governor	
1839 to 1841	Jean Baptiste Marie Augustin Gourbeyre, Governor	
1841 to 1843	Guillaume Basile Charmasson de Puylaval, Governor	
1843 to 1845	Marie Jean-François Layrle, Governor	
1845 to 1846	Jean Baptiste Armand Bertrand Cadéot, Governor	
18 February 1846 to 16 May 1850	André Aimé Pariset, Governor	

== Second Republic and Empire ==
Term	Incumbent	Notes
1850 to 6 January 1851	Louis Eugène Maissin, Governor	
1851	Jean François Marie Félix Stanislas Vidal de Lingendes, acting Governor	
May 1851 to May 1852	Octave Pierre Antoine Henri de Chabannes-Curton, Governor	
1852 to 1853	Joseph Napoléon Sarda-Garriga, Governor	
1853 to 1854	Martin Fourichon, Governor	
1854 to 1855	Louis Adolphe Bonard, Governor	
1855 to January 1856	Antoine Alphonse Masset, acting Governor	
January 1856 to 1859	Auguste Laurent François Baudin, Governor	
15 May 1859 to 1 May 1864	Louis-Marie-François Tardy de Montravel, Governor	
1864 to 1865	Antoine Favre, acting Governor	
1865 to 1870	Privat Antoine Agathon Hennique, Governor	
1870	J. A. A. Noyer, acting Governor	

== Third Republic ==
Term	Incumbent	Notes
30 April 1870 to 14 May 1871	Jean-Louis Loubère, acting Governor	
14 May 1871 to 29 September 1877	Jean-Louis Loubère, Governor	
1877	A.E. Bouet, acting Governor	
1877 to 1880	Marie Alfred-Armand Huart, Governor	
1880	P.A. Trève, acting Governor	
1880 to 1883	Charles Alexandre Lacouture, Governor	
1883 to 1884	Henri Isidore Chessé, Governor	
1884 to 1885	Jean Baptiste Antoine Lougnon, acting Governor	
1885 to 1887	Léonce Pierre Henri Le Cardinal, Governor	
1888 to 1891	Anne Léodor Philotée Metellus Gerville-Réache, Governor	
April 1891 to 1893	Louis Albert Grodet, Governor	1st time
1893	Paul Émile Joseph Casimir Fawtier, Governor	
24 April 1893 to 4 August 1895	Camille Charvein, Governor	
30 August 1895 to 13 June 1896	Henri Félix de Lamothe, Governor	
1896 to 1898	Henri Eloi Danel, Governor	
1898 to 1899	Henri Charles Victor Amédée Roberdeau, Governor	
1899	Louis Mouttet, Governor	
1899 to 1903	Émile Joseph Merwart, Governor	
1903 to 1905	Louis Albert Grodet, Governor	2nd time
1905	Charles Emmanuel Joseph Marchal, Governor	
1905 to 1906	Victor François Ferdinand Rey, Governor	
1906	Louis Alphonse Bonhoure, Governor	
20 January 1906 to 5 July 1907	Édouard Picanon, Governor	
1907 to 1909	François Pierre Rodier, Governor	
1909 to 1910	William Maurice Fawtier, Governor	
1910	Fernand Ernest Thérond, Governor	
1910 to 31 May 1911	Paul Samary, Governor	
1911	Denis Joseph Goujon, Governor	
1911 to 1914	Pierre Jean Henri Didelot, Governor	1st time
1914 to 1916	Fernand Ernest Lévecque, Governor	
1916	Pierre Jean Henri Didelot, Governor	2nd time
1916 to 1917	Georges Lévy, Governor	
1917	Jules Gérard Auguste Lauret, Governor	
1917 to 1918	Antoine Joseph Xavier Barre, Governor	
1918 to 1923	Henri Alphonse Joseph Lejeune, Governor	
1923	Julien Edgard Cantau, Governor	
20 November 1923 to 1926	Marc Émile Charles Jean Chanel, Governor	
1926 to 1927	Gabriel Henri Joseph Thaly, Governor	
1927	François Adrien Juvanon, Governor	
1927 to 1928	Émile Buhot-Launay, Governor	
1928 to 1929	Camille Théodore Raoul Maillet, Governor	
1929 to 6 July 1930	Bernard Jacques Victorin Siadous, Governor	
French Guiana divided into two territories: French Guiana (Cayenne and the Atlantic coast) and Inini (inland area)
6 July 1930 to 1931	Bernard Jacques Victorin Siadous, Governor	
27 May 1931 to 1933	Louis Joseph Bouge, acting Governor	
1933 to 1935	Julien Georges Lamy, Governor	
2 June 1935 to 1936	Max de Masson de Saint-Félix, Governor	
1936	Pierre Tap, Governor	
1936 to 1938	René Veber, Governor	1st time
1938 to 1942	Robert Paul Chot-Plassot, Governor	
1942 to 18 March 1943	René Veber, Governor	2nd time
1943 to 1944	Jean Alexandre Léon Rapenne, Governor	
1944 to 1946	Jules Eucher Surlemont, Governor	
1946	Jean Pezet, Governor	

== Fourth and Fifth Republic ==
Term	Incumbent	Notes
16 August 1947 to 1 June 1955	Robert Vignon, Prefect	
1 June 1955 to 16 September 1957	Pierre Malvy, Prefect	
1 October 1957 to 1 November 1958	Pierre Voitellier, Prefect	
13 October 1958 to 1 December 1960	André Dubois-Chabert, Prefect	Acting for Voitellier to 1 November 1958
1 December 1960 to 1 December 1963	René Erignac, Prefect	
1 December 1963 to 16 August 1967	René Letellier, Prefect	
16 August 1967 to 16 July 1970	Paul Bouteiller, Prefect	
16 July 1970 to 1 February 1972	Jean Monfraix, Prefect	
1 February 1972 to 8 February 1974	Jacques Robert Delaunay, Prefect	
5 March 1974 to 20 May 1977	Hervé Bourseillier, Prefect	
20 May 1977 to 10 February 1980	Jean Julien Émile Le Direach, Prefect	
10 February 1980 to 27 July 1981	Antoine Carli, Prefect	
27 July 1981 to 10 May 1982	Maxime Gonzalvo, Prefect	
10 May 1982 to 22 July 1982	Maxime Gonzalvo, Commissioner of the Republic	
July 1982 to 1984	Claude Silberzahn, Commissioner of the Republic	
1984 to 1986	Bernard Courtois, Commissioner of the Republic	
1986 to 24 February 1988	Jacques Dewatre, Commissioner of the Republic	
24 February 1988 to August 1988	Jacques Dewatre, Prefect	
22 August 1988 to 16 May 1990	Jean-Pierre Lacroix, Prefect	
19 June 1990 to May 1992	Jean-François Di Chiara, Prefect	
27 May 1992 to 6 January 1995	Jean-François Cordet, Prefect	
6 January 1995 to 3 February 1997	Pierre Dartout, Prefect	
3 February 1997 to 2 August 1999	Dominique Vian, Prefect	
2 August 1999 to 2 September 2002	Henri Masse, Prefect	
2 September 2002 to 28 March 2003	Ange Mancini, Prefect	
French overseas region
28 March 2003 to August 2006	Ange Mancini, Prefect	
28 August 2006 to February 2009	Jean-Pierre Laflaquière, Prefect	
19 February 2009 to 1 May 2011	Daniel Ferey, Prefect	
1 May 2011 to 10 June 2013	Denis Labbé, Prefect	
10 June 2013 to 11 January 2016	Eric Spitz, Prefect	
11 January 2016 to 28 August 2017	Martin Jaeger, Prefect	
28 August 2017 to 10 July 2019	Patrice Faure, Prefect	
10 July 2019 to 25 November 2020	Marc Del Grande, Prefect	
25 November 2020 to 21 August 2023	Thierry Queffelec, Prefect	
21 August 2023 to present	Antoine Poussier, Prefect	

== See also ==
- Politics of French Guiana
- History of French Guiana
