= List of governors of Guiana =

List of governors of Guiana can refer to:

- List of governors of British Guiana
- List of governors of French Guiana
- List of governor-generals of Guyana
- List of colonial governors of Suriname which was sometimes referred to as Dutch Guiana
