= Agathon Hennique =

Privat Antoine Agathon Hennique
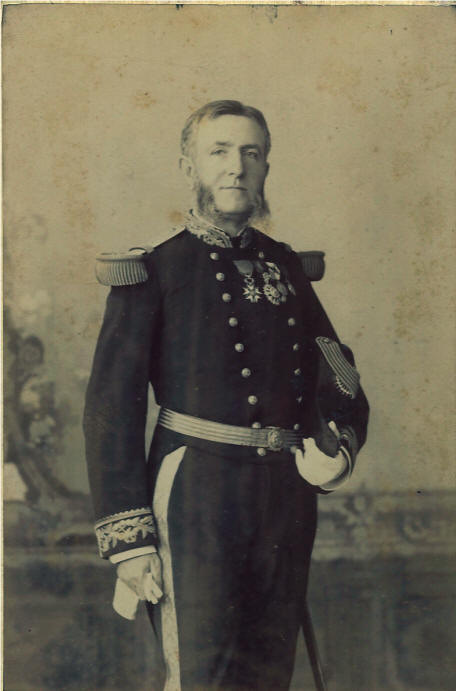

Governor of French Guiana
- In office 1865–1870
- Preceded by: Louis-Marie-François Tardy de Montravel; Antoine Favre (acting)
- Succeeded by: Jean Antoine Alexandre Noyer (acting); Jean-Louis Loubère

Personal details
- Born: 12 September 1810 Couvron-et-Aumencourt, Aisne, France
- Died: 13 April 1870 (aged 59) Cayenne, French Guiana
- Occupation: Soldier

Privat Antoine Agathon Hennique (12 September 1810 – 13 April 1870) was a French soldier who served as governor of French Guiana from 1865 to 1870.

== Early years (1810–49) ==
Privat Antoine Agathon Hennique was born on 12 September 1810 in Couvron-et-Aumencourt, Aisne. On 5 December 1830 he joined the 61st Line Regiment. In 1832 he transferred to the Marine Infantry. He was promoted to second lieutenant 27 December 1838 and to lieutenant on 8 October 1840. On 1 January 1841 he was serving with the Bourbon detachment of the 3rd Marine Infantry Regiment. He was promoted to captain on 3 January 1843. On 4 September 1843 he married Héloïse Clarisse Piot. Their children were Privat Agathon Benjamin Arthur (1844–1916), Agathon Nicolas Auguste Ernest (1845–1891) and Léon (1850–1935). His son Léon Hennique, born in Basse-Terre, Guadeloupe, became a naturalist novelist and dramatist. On 1 January 1847 he was an adjudant-major in Toulon.

== Senior officer (1849–65) ==
Hennique was promoted to major on 26 January 1849 with the Guadeloupe detachment of the 1st Marine Infantry Regiment. He was promoted to lieutenant colonel on 30 January 1856. On 1 January 1857 he was with the Guadeloupe detachment of the 2nd Marine Infantry Regiment of Brest. He was appointed colonel on 10 November 1860.

On 5 March 1862 Hennique joined the forces of the Second French intervention in Mexico. His marine regiment was part of the force under Charles de Lorencez that struck inland from Córdoba, Veracruz on 19 April 1862. On 2 July 1862 he became a commander of the Legion of Honour. On 1 January 1863 he was commander of the 2nd Marine Infantry Regiment of Brest on service in Mexico. He was promoted to brigadier general on 15 December 1863.

== Governor of French Guiana (1865–70) ==
In 1865 Hennique became governor of French Guiana, replacing the interim governor Antoine Favre, who had in turn replaced governor Louis Marie François Tardy de Montravel. He originated a proposal, approved by Napoleon III in a decree of 19 April 1868, "that the monumental fountain erected on the Place du Gouvernement at Cayenne take the name of Fontaine de Montravel to perpetuate in the memory of the population the name and the outstanding services of the Rear-Admiral Tardy de Montravel, former governor of Guyana ". Hennique held office until 6 January 1870, when Jean Antoine Alexandre Noyer took over as acting governor, to be succeeded by Jean-Louis Loubère as governor. Hennique died on 13 April 1870 in Cayenne, French Guiana, aged 59.

== Sources ==
- Cahoon, Ben, "French Guiana", World Statesmen
- Garric, Alain, "Privat François Agathon HENNIQUE Le Général", Geneanet (in French)
- Jogerst, Gilles, "Privat François Agathon HENNIQUE", Ecole navale (in French)
- "Léon Hennique", Libreriausados.com.ar (in French), archived from the original on 2018-08-11
- Marley, David (2008), Wars of the Americas: A Chronology of Armed Conflict in the Western Hemisphere, 1492 to the Present, ABC-CLIO, ISBN 978-1-59884-100-8
- Nansenet, Eric (4 July 2018), Epi sur l'eau: Visite des fontaines de Cayenne (in French), Collège Réeberg Néron
