= Loubère =

Loubère is a French surname. It may refer to:

- Jean-Louis Loubère (1820–1893), French soldier, governor of French Guiana
- Simon de la Loubère (1642–1729), French diplomat, writer, mathematician and poet
