= Jean-Louis Loubère =

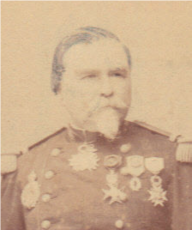

Acting Governor of French Guiana
- In office 30 April 1870 – 14 May 1871
- Preceded by: Privat Antoine Agathon Hennique; Jean Antoine Alexandre Noyer (acting)
- Succeeded by: (self)

Governor of French Guiana
- In office 14 May 1871 – 29 September 1877
- Preceded by: (self)
- Succeeded by: Alexandre Eugène Bouët (acting); Marie Alfred-Armand Huart

Personal details
- Born: 18 August 1820 Riguepeu, Gers, France
- Died: 28 December 1893 (aged 73) Paris, France
- Occupation: Soldier

Jean-Louis Loubère (18 August 1820 – 28 December 1893) was a French career soldier who served as governor of French Guiana from 1870 to 1877. He is known for the many improvements he made to the colony's roads using convict labour.

== Military career (1820–70) ==
Jean-Louis Loubère was born on 18 August 1820 in Riguepeu, Gers. He joined the naval infantry on 11 August 1841. He was promoted to sub-lieutenant on 10 November 1844, and to lieutenant on 10 November 1846.

Loubère became captain on 2 July 1853 and battalion commander on 17 October 1857. He served in Cochinchina, then was orderly officer to the governor of French Guiana. On 11 August 1859 he was made an officer of the Legion of Honour. He was director of the French Guiana penitentiaries under Governor Louis Tardy de Montravel. In 1859 Loubère was given sick leave to return from French Guiana to France. On 1 January 1860 Loubère was assigned to the general staff. On 16 August 1860 he married Anne Masson de Longpré in Paris. He was promoted to lieutenant colonel on 25 June 1862.

Loubère returned to Cochinchina as commander of Biên Hòa Province from 1862 to 1866. An insurrection led by the mandarin Quan-Dinh had spread throughout the provinces of Cochinchina by December 1862. Loubère and the other local commanders stood firm, but Governor Louis Adolphe Bonard had to ask for reinforcements from Manila and from the naval station of China commanded by admiral Benjamin Jaurès. The revolt was suppressed by February 1863, and Bonard went to Huế where the Treaty of Huế was signed on 14 April by the Vietnamese emperor Tự Đức.

Loubère helped obtain stones in Biên Hòa of the right size for construction of the Saigon orphanage, which was built by a young Annamite for the Sisters of Saint Paul of Chartres. On 1 January 1869 Loubère was given command of the 1st naval infantry regiment in Martinique under governor Charles Bertier. He was promoted to colonel and was chief of the 2nd regiment of marine infantry from 1869 to 1870.

== Governor of French Guiana (1870–77) ==
French Guiana

Loubère was acting governor of French Guiana from 30 April 1870 to 14 March 1871. He replaced the acting governor Jean Antoine Alexandre Noyer, who had served from 6 January to 30 April 1870. Noyer had in turn replaced Privat Antoine Agathon Hennique, who died in 1870. Loubère was governor of French Guiana from 14 May 1871 to 29 September 1877.

Loubère was strong-willed and active, and was known as a great builder. He constructed roads with embankments, bridges, public buildings, sewers and a stone barracks, all of which were still mostly intact at the end of the World War II. He also established schools and supported improvements to crops and livestock through breeding. He was involved in the introduction of Eucalyptus trees from Australia to French Guiana.

Loubère used felons transported to French Guiana to work on improving communications in the colony. He upgraded the Rémire road leading to the Mahury estuary along the coast and the Madeleine road leading to the Mahury via the Tigre Mountain, which had previously been dusty tracks in the summer that turned into mud in the winter. He built roads from Cayenne to the Oyapock, Kaw and Approuague, and along the coast from Cayenne to the Maroni.

Loubère was promoted to commander of the Legion of Honour on 15 July 1873. In 1875 Jacques Eugène Barnabè Ruillier took over as acting governor from 3 March 1875 to 30 December 1875. Alexandre Eugène Bouët was acting governor from 15 July 1877 to 29 September 1877. On 29 September 1877 Loubère was replaced as governor of French Guiana by Marie Alfred-Armand Huart.

== Last years (1877–93) ==
After retiring in 1877 Loubère became president of the Société de Géographie of Tours. Loubère died in Paris on 28 December 1893 at the age of 73.

== Sources ==
- "Biên Hòa", Nguoi Ke Su (in Vietnamese)
- Boüinais, Albert Marie Aristide; Paulus, A. (1884), La Cochinchine contemporaine (in French), Challamel Ainé
- Cahoun, Ben, "French Guiana", World Statesmen
- Garric, Alain, "Jean Louis LOUBÈRE", Geneanet (in French)
- Guyane Française (1868), Bulletin officiel de la Guyane Française (in French), Impr. du Gouvernement.
- "LOUBERE, Jean Louis", Base Léonore (in French)
- Miche, Vicaire apost. (1865), "Cochinchine Occidentale", Annales de l'Oeuvre de la Sainte Enfance (in French)
- Psalmon, Serge (2003), Hélices, Tuyères et Palétuviers (in French), Editions Publibook, ISBN 978-2-7483-0196-0
- Richard, Henry (1906), Notice Historique sur La Guyane Francaise (in French), Paris: Union des Arts Graphiques
- Société d'Acclimatation (1874), Bulletin de la Société d'Acclimatation (in French)
