= Antoine Lefèbvre de La Barre =

French politician

Joseph-Antoine le Fèbvre, sieur de La Barre
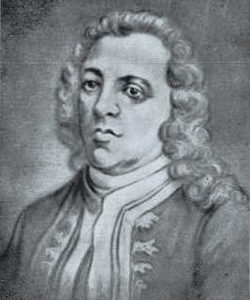

Governor of Cayenne
- In office 15 May 1664 – 1665
- Preceded by: Guerin Spranger
- Succeeded by: Antoine de Noël de la Trompe d'Or

Governor-General of French Antilles
- In office 1666–1669
- Preceded by: Alexandre de Prouville de Tracy; Sieur de Chambray (interim)
- Succeeded by: Jean-Charles de Baas

Governor of Cayenne
- In office 1668–1670
- Preceded by: Cyprien Lefebvre de Lézy
- Succeeded by: Cyprien Lefebvre de Lézy

Governor General of New France
- In office 1682–1685
- Preceded by: Louis de Buade de Frontenac
- Succeeded by: Le marquis de Denonville

Personal details
- Born: 1622 France
- Died: 1688 (aged 65–66) Paris, Kingdom of France
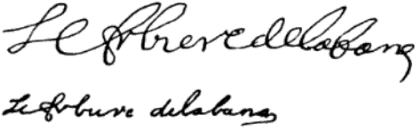
- Signature

Joseph-Antoine le Fèbvre, sieur de La Barre (or Antoine Lefebvre, Antoine Lefèvre; 1622–1688) was a French lawyer and administrator best known for his disastrous three years as governor of the colony of New France (Quebec).

As a young man he served in the administration in France. He then became governor of Cayenne in French Guiana in 1664 after it was recovered from the Dutch. After handing Cayenne over to his brother, he served briefly as lieutenant-general of the French West Indies colonies, then for many years was a naval captain. In two engagements he was accused of cowardice, but in others he served with distinction. At the age of 60 he was appointed Governor of New France, holding office from 1682 to 1685. He spent much of his energy in trading ventures, using his position as governor to attack his great rival René-Robert Cavelier de La Salle. He began a war with the Haudenosaunee (Iroquois), the main power in the region, and led a poorly equipped expedition against them that ran into difficulty. He was forced to agree to a disadvantageous peace treaty that was condemned by France's Indian allies, the colonists, and the French court. He was recalled as a result and spent his last few years as a wealthy man in Paris.

== Life ==
=== Early years (1622–64) ===
Antoine Le Febvre, Sieur de la Barre, was born in Paris in 1622. His parents were Antoine Le Febvre de La Barre and Madeleine Belin. His father was a counsellor in the Parlement (court of appeal) of Paris and the prévôt des marchands^{(fr)}. Around 1643 La Barre married Marie Gascon. They had one daughter, Marie (c. 1644–1716). (Note: Rémy Guillouet, seigneur d'Orvilliers, married La Barre's daughter Marie (c. 1644–1716). The marriage led to Rémy Guillouet becoming governor of Cayenne at the start of the 18th century. His son Claude Guillouet d'Orvilliers was governor of Cayenne from September 1716 until his death in December 1729. Claude's son Gilbert Guillouet d'Orvilliers was governor of Cayenne from 1749 to 1763.) On 10 September 1645 La Barre married Marie Mandat. Their children included Robert (born c. 1647), François Antoine, Seigneur de La Barre (1650–1727), Marguerite (1651–1725) and Jeanne Françoise (1654–1735).

In 1646 La Barre was made a counsellor of the Parlement. He was appointed a maître des requêtes (master of requests) in 1653. He was intendant in Paris during the Fronde civil war. He was then in turn intendant of Grenoble (Dauphiné), Moulins (Bourbonnais) and Auvergne. In 1659 Jean-Baptiste Colbert complained to Cardinal Mazarin that the people of Dauphiné hated La Barre. Mazarin replied that he should be allowed to resign. He was appointed intendant of Bourbonnais in 1663.

=== Cayenne (French Guiana) (1664–65) ===
In 1663 the French decided to regain control of their former colony of Cayenne (French Guiana) from the Dutch, despite being at peace with the Netherlands at the time. Alexandre de Prouville de Tracy was appointed Lieutenant Général of the Americas and was tasked with this mission. La Barre formed the Compagnie de la France équinoxiale in the Bourbonnais to colonize what is now French Guiana. On 26 February 1664 Tracy sailed from La Rochelle, France, with seven ships and 1,200 picked men of the Compagnie de la France équinoxiale led by La Barre. His first stop was in Cayenne, which the Dutch commander Guerin Spranger surrendered without opposition on 15 May 1664. Tracy disembarked La Barre and his garrison, and left for Martinique. Germán Arciniegas relates,

In the Antilles. among Dutch, French and English things are settled in a brotherly manner. Underneath the skin we are all humans. Guerin Spranger, a Dutchman, was once governor of Guyana, and the French fleet tried to seize the place. The Dutchman weighed up his forces, saw that it was useless to resist and proposes the Frenchmen to give him 21.850 guilder for his plantations. The guilder appeared and the province surrendered without firing one shot. It all happened on the white sheet of a cash book.(Arciniegas. p. 211).

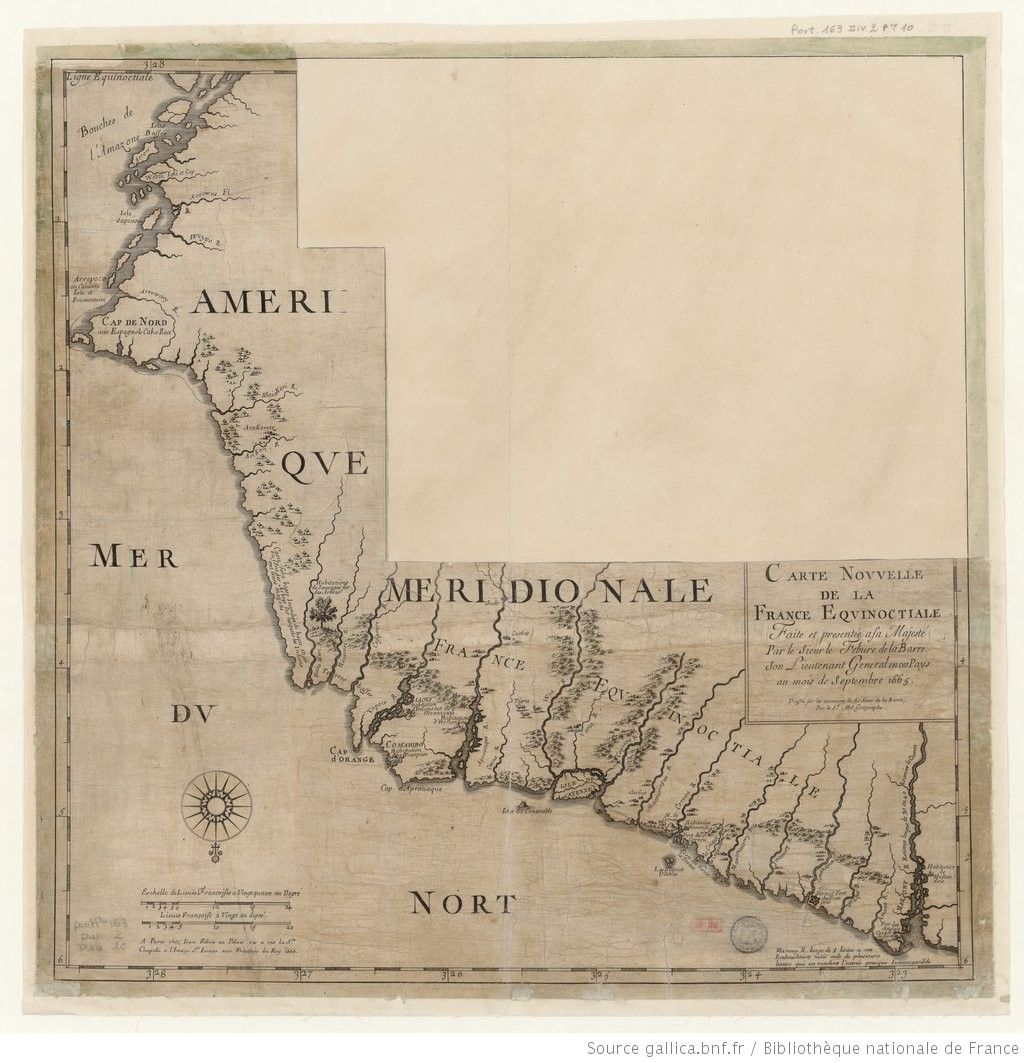
Map of France équinoxiale by La Barre (1666)

An agreement between Spranger, de Tracy and de la Barre dated 15 March 1664 set out the terms of surrender. It recognized the Dutch rights to lands in the island, and to their guns, ammunition, merchandise, provisions and appurtenances. The French would let the Dutch military march out, drums beating, and would give them and all other inhabitants transport with their goods and slaves to their destination island or country, providing food and drink on the voyage. The inhabitants who remained, including the Jews, would have freedom of religion and full possession of their goods, lands and slaves. If they chose to leave they could sell their land and take their goods and slaves with them.

La Barre established a garrison at Fort Cépérou, Cayenne, and started construction of a settlement of 200 huts. Back in France, on 11 July 1664 Jean-Baptiste Colbert, with the king's agreement, founded the Royal West Indies Company (Compagnie Royale des Indes Occidentales). La Barre was appointed Lieutenant General of the Company and Governor of Cayenne. In February 1665 the ship La Suzanne arrived in Cayenne with 180 men. La Barre learned from the ship of the new West India company, and set off for France. There he published an account of his mission and thoughts on the future of the colony as La Description de la France équinoxiale. He obtained the appointment of his younger brother Cyprien Lefebvre de Lézy as governor of Cayenne from the West Indies Company. Cyprien Lefebvre replaced the acting governor, Antoine de Noël de la Trompe d'Or, who left office on 8 September 1655.

=== Lieutenant general of the Antilles (1665–68) ===
During the Second Anglo-Dutch War (1665–67) La Barre was appointed lieutenant general and sent to the West Indies in 1666 to defend them against the English. The intendant at Rochefort, Charles Colbert du Terron), told the minister that La Barre was a poor choice as leader of this expedition since he had no stomach for war. On 7 October 1666 La Barre presented himself to the council on Martinique and registered his commission, dated 26 February 1666, to command the vessels and maritime forces of the islands. Soon after he called an assembly of the senior officers and leading inhabitants of the island to hear their complaints concerning commerce and to respond on behalf of the company. La Barre rightly thought that Nevis was the most important English base in the Leeward Islands. In November 1666 the war council turned down his proposal to attack and capture Nevis.

A letter patent from the king date 1 February 1667 confirmed La Barre as lieutenant-general of the French armies, islands and mainland of America. On 4 February 1667 a fleet under La Barre arrived at Montserrat. La Barre learned that the garrison of the English Governor Roger Osborne included many Irish Catholics of dubious loyalty, and decided to land a few days later. His land force included 500 militiamen from Saint Christophe under governor Claude de Roux de Saint-Laurent and 500 regular troops of the Navarre and Normandie regiments led by Marshall Saint Léon. The force advanced inland in search of the English force, which they could not find, but they did capture Osborne's wife and other civilians, forcing the governor to sue for peace. The French took large quantities of armaments, slaves, horses and cattle. 2,000 Irish residents of Montserrat agreed to become subjects of France under the Sieur de Praille as interim governor.

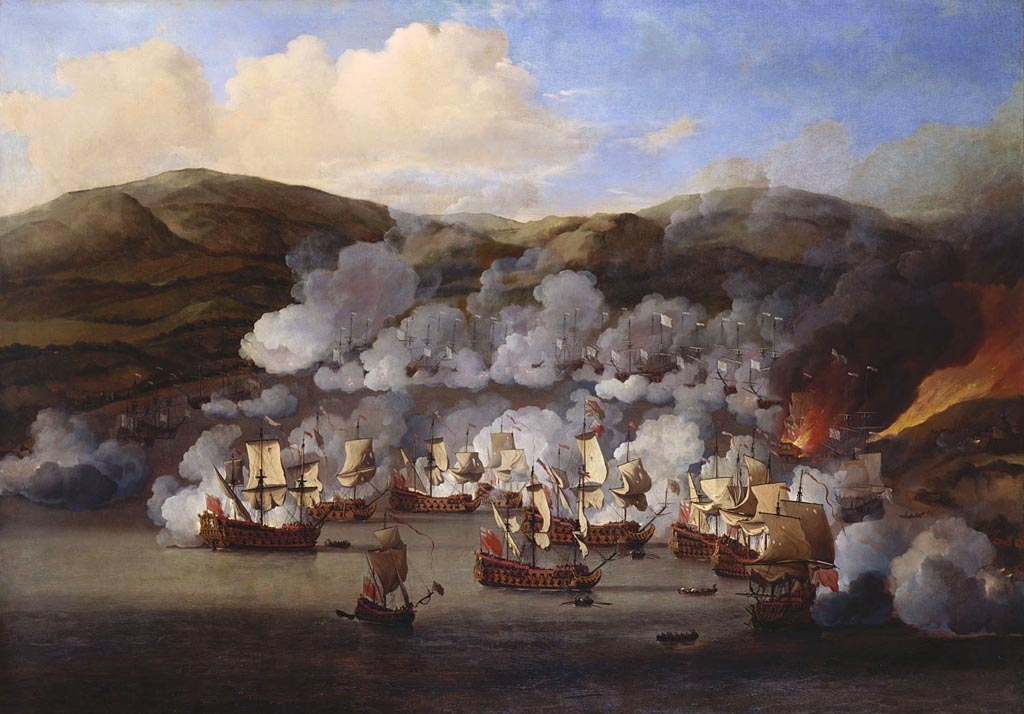
Battle of Martinique (1667)

In April 1667 La Barre's ship Armes d’Angleterre engaged in a desperate battle with the English ship Colchester. The Armes d'Angleterre with 24 guns and a crew of 110 defeated the larger Colchester with 44 guns and 300 men in an engagement off the point of Nevis. La Barre was wounded and returned to Martinique. The Dutch commander Abraham Crijnssen heard that an English squadron commanded by Sir John Berry had entered the Caribbean, and sailed to Martinique to discuss plans with the French. La Barre proposed joint action against the English, which became more urgent when word arrived that Saint Christopher Island was being blockaded by Berry. La Barre and the governor of Martinique, Robert de Clodoré combined their forces with Crijnssen. The Franco-Dutch fleet sailed for Nevis, and engaged the English in the Battle of Nevis (20 May 1667). La Barre caused a retreat through his incompetence, and Crijnssen left for Virginia in disgust.

After returning to Martinique La Barre and Clodoré were arguing when a British fleet under Admiral John Harman arrived and in the Battle of Martinique bombarded the French ships off Saint-Pierre. La Barre appears to have panicked and ordered his ships to be scuttled. On 31 July 1667 the Treaty of Breda restored peace and ordered return of colonies captured by either side. A letter from the king dated 15 September 1668 named Jean-Charles de Baas governor and lieutenant general of the Antilles. Another letter dated 19 September 1668 ordered La Barre to return to France to report on the state of the islands.

=== Naval officer (1668–82) ===
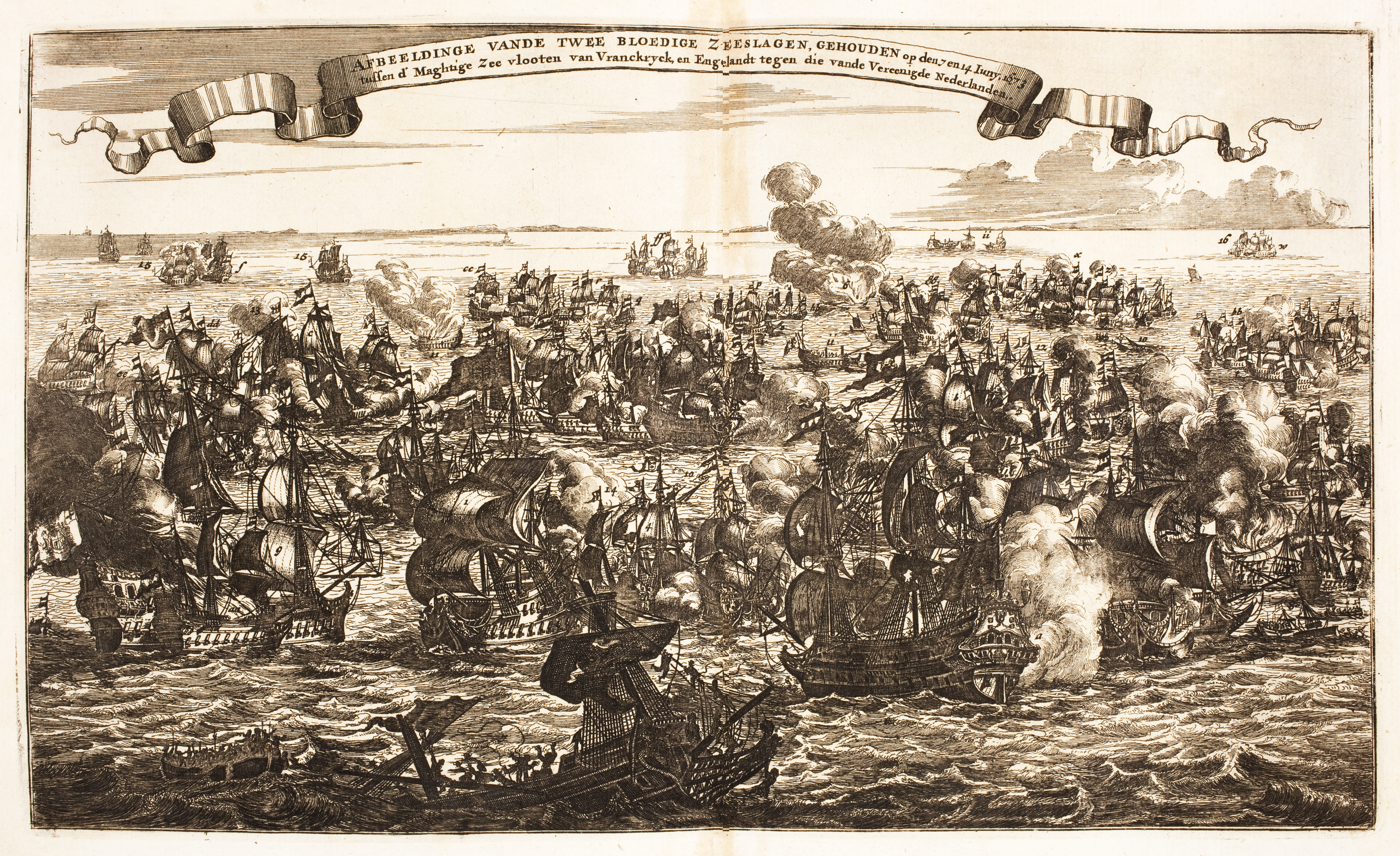
Battle of Schooneveld

Cayenne was sacked by English forces under the command of Rear-Admiral Sir John Harman in August 1667. Harman's forces destroyed Fort Cépérou and the town of Cayenne. Cyprien Lefebvre left on 23 September 1667. From December 1667 the Jesuit father Jean Morellet was the de facto governor. After peace was restored in 1668 de La Barre returned, and held office until 1670. Cyprien Lefebvre again took charge of Cayenne in 1670, and held office until March 1679.

The 1670 Treaty of Dover united England and France against Holland. La Barre was made captain of a man-of-war in 1671. That year he published Journal du voyage du sieur de la Barre en la terre ferme et ile de Cayenne. It appeared as part of the Relation de ce qui s’est passé dans les îles de l’Amérique en 1666–1667 (Paris, 1671). Jean-Baptiste Labat said this was "rather a Factum against M. de Closdoré, the governor of Martinique, than an exact and sincere account of what occurred there." In 1673 La Barre was in command of a ship in the squadron of Admiral Jean II d'Estrées and was distinguished in action. La Barre commanded the Sage in the Battle of Schooneveld on 7 June 1673, in which the Dutch were defeated. He was in command of the Maure in 1674 in the Mediterranean fleet of Jean-Baptiste de Valbelle.

=== New France (1682–85) ===
Locations in New France

==== Governor ====
King Louis XIV appointed the 60 year old La Barre governor general of New France (Canada) on 1 May 1682. La Barre was to replace Louis de Buade de Frontenac. At this time the Haudenosaunee were powerful and had defeated the other tribes in the region and were threatening the French. The English were active in Hudson Bay to the north and in New York to the south. La Barre reached Quebec City at the end of September 1682, a month after half the town had been burned down. He was accompanied by his wife Marie, his daughter Anne-Marie, his son-in-law Rémy Guillouet d'Orvilliers, captain of the guards, and the intendant Jacques de Meulles. Jacques de Meulles was related to the minister Jean-Baptiste Colbert by marriage.

La Barre was personally instructed by Louis XIV that he must focus on restoring order and good government and must do everything to avoid internal disputes between the colonists, which had done great damage under Frontenac. He was told that he should allow no more expeditions against the Sioux and the Mississippi, since the king thought his subjects would be better employed in cultivating the land. La Salle, however, could continue his explorations if they seemed useful. De Meules was given the same instructions by the Minister of the Marine.

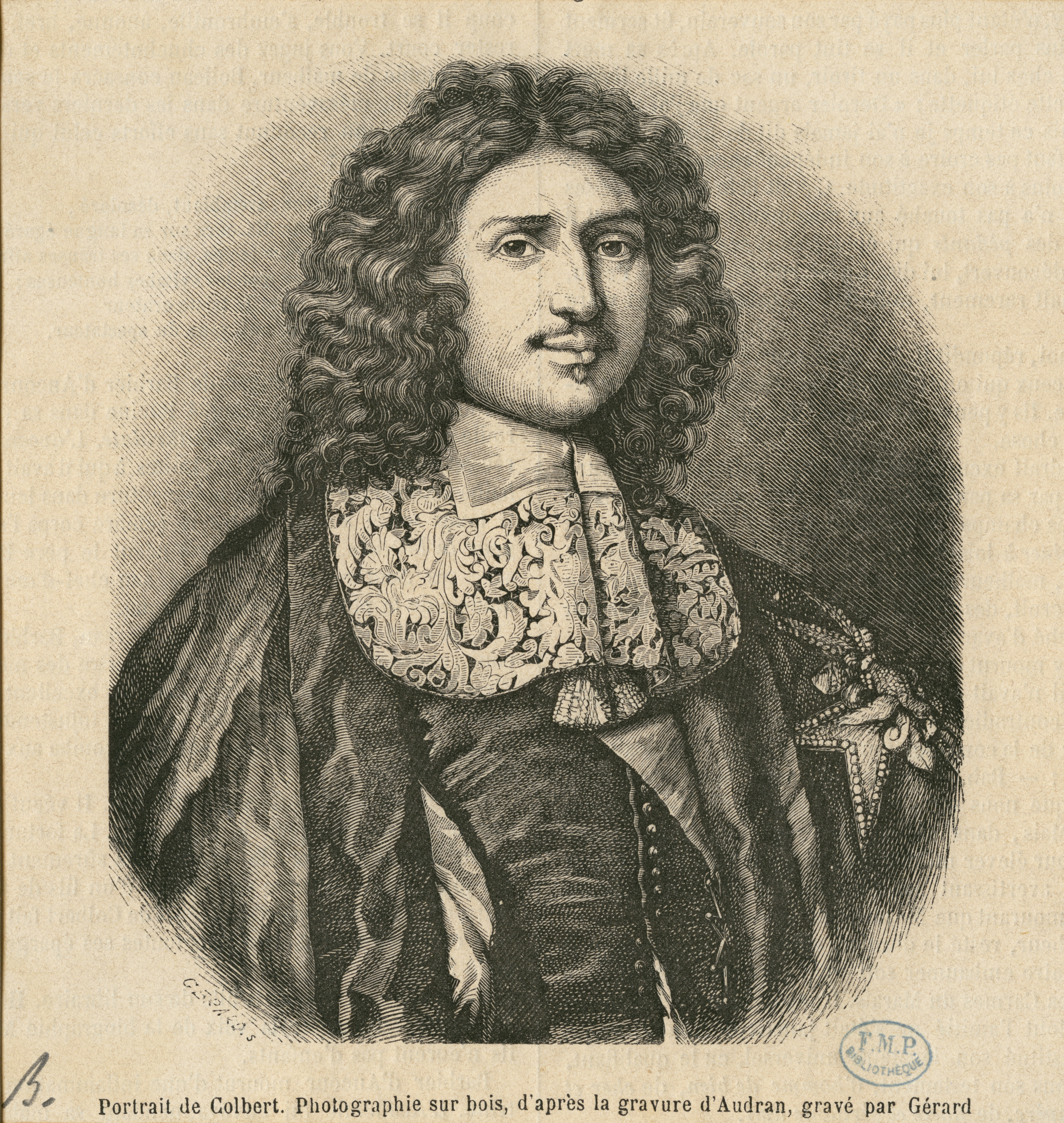
Colbert de Seignelay, Minister of Marine

La Barre wrote letters to the king and the Navy minister Jean-Baptiste Colbert de Seignelay in which he said that unlike his predecessors he did not intend to engage in trade for his personal benefit. He was sure he could overcome the Haudenosaunee, who would have heard of his victories in the West Indies. La Barre thought the Haudenosaunee wanted to destroy New France so they could control the fur trade, perhaps more a reflection of his own outlook than that of the Haudenosaunee.

On 10 October 1682 La Barre met with the military and religious leaders of New France to discuss the general situations and the threat from the Haudenosaunee Confederation, particularly the Tsonnontouans (Senecas) . La Barre and de Meulles managed to persuade the king to send money and 200 soldiers the next year. The king instructed La Barre to try for a diplomatic settlement with the Haudenosaunee, and only to attack if he was sure of a rapid victory. La Barre had a list of land grants drawn up in 1682. He supported the independence of the clergy from the civil administration, and in 1684 increased the parish priests' pay.

Charles Le Moyne de Longueuil managed to bring 13 Seneca Haudenosaunee to meet La Barre on 20 July 1683 in Montreal, and on 14 August 1683 a delegation of 43 Haudenosaunee chiefs met La Barre in Montreal. La Barre could not get the Haudenosaunee to agree to make peace with the Illinois, but they did agree to leave the Ottawas and Hurons in peace and to return the next spring to ratify the treaty. He reported that they demanded that René-Robert de La Salle be forced to leave Fort Saint-Louis, a post on the Illinois River. The delegates left on good terms, but La Barre thought they were insincere. The Haudenosaunee forces were growing in strength while the rival Miami and Illinois Indians were weakening.

==== Fur trader ====
Francis Parkman (1823–1893) wrote in The Discovery of the Great West (1874),

La Barre showed a weakness and an avarice for which his advanced age may have been in some measure answerable. He was no whit less unscrupulous than his predecessor in his secret violation of the royal ordinances regulating the fur-trade, which it was his duty to enforce. Like Frontenac, he took advantage of his position to carry on an illicit traffic with the Indians; but it was with different associates. The late governor's friends were the new governor's enemies; and La Salle, armed with his monopolies, was the object of his especial jealousy.

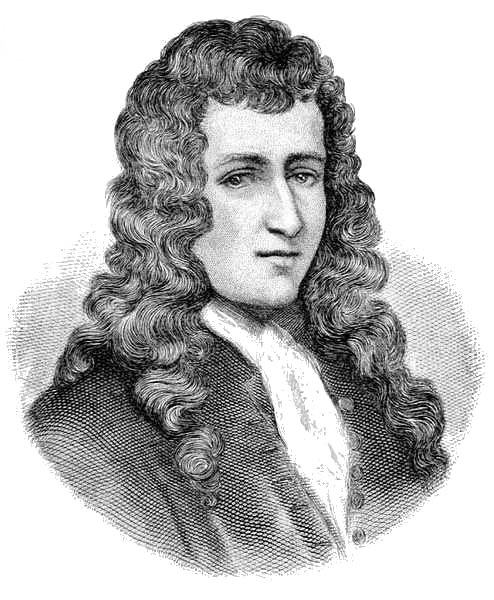
René-Robert de La Salle

In 1682 La Barre founded the Compagnie du Nord trading company to compete with the Hudson Bay traders. La Barre gave Daniel Greysolon, Sieur du Lhut a 3-year commission early in 1683 to take an expedition of 15 canoes to the western Great Lakes and the upper Mississippi. He was to restore the northwest tribes to obedience to the French, and prevent them from taking their furs to the English traders in Hudson Bay. De Meulles charged in a report of 10 October 1684 that La Barre had merchandise for his personal trading ventures carried by military supply convoys. Although he claimed he meant to fight the Haudenosaunee, La Barre tried to organize trade with them to his own profit. In May 1683 the Haudenosaunee started to attack the Indians who were allied with the French. La Barre tried unsuccessfully to get Thomas Dongan, 2nd Earl of Limerick, governor of New York, to stop supporting the Haudenosaunee and selling them goods at lower prices than the French.

In the spring of 1683 La Barre sent two officers to the Great Lakes and Illinois regions to report on the practices of the coureurs de bois who were engaged in unlicensed fur trading, and to invite the Indians to bring their furs to La Barre in Montreal. La Salle's Fort Frontenac (today Kingston, Ontario) was attracting furs away from the Montreal traders. La Barre entered a partnership against La Salle with the merchants Jacques Le Ber and Charles Aubert de La Chesnaye. The Intendant de Meulles accused La Barre in his letters to Seignelay of selling large numbers of licenses to fur traders and of trading with the English and the Dutch. La Barre denied these charges.

La Barre was determined to remove La Salle, and in the summer of 1683 sent Aubert and Le Ber to seize Fort Frontenac and La Salle's merchandise on the grounds that La Salle had failed to meet the conditions under which he became owner of the fort. There was some validity to this. La Salle's 5-year concession had expired, and the minister had stated that he was far from satisfied with the very limited results delivered by La Salle from his explorations. Later that summer La Barre sent the Chevalier de Baugy to seize Fort Saint-Louis, a trading post built by La Salle's deputy Henri de Tonti.

La Barre authorized the Haudenosaunee to seize the goods from any canoe whose owner could not show a passport signed by La Barre. They used this as a license to pillage all the canoes they could find, including ones that carried La Barre's goods. According to Francis Parkman it was these incidents and La Barre's desire to protect his own trading interests that caused him to go to war with the Haudenosaunee. Baron Lahontan also states that the war was intended only to support a trading venture.

==== War against the Haudenosaunee ====
The Haudenosaunee attacked Fort Saint-Louis on 21 March 1684, but Tonti and Baugy drove them off. The Jesuits, who had much experience in dealing with the Indians, advised La Barre to avoid provoking the Haudenosaunee, while the leading men of Quebec wanted to delay war until there was no longer any chance of a negotiated peace, and until fresh troops had arrived from France. The Jesuit missionary Julien Garnier sent a letter to La Barre on 23 April 1684 in which he opposed war against the Haudenosaunee due to the effect it would have on the Jesuit missions. Despite this advice, La Barre launched a war on the Haudenosaunee in the summer of 1684, apparently in order to force them to trade with the French rather than the English. On 30 July 1684 the king wrote to La Barre agreeing with the decision, which had been presented as a response to the attack on Fort Saint-Louis.

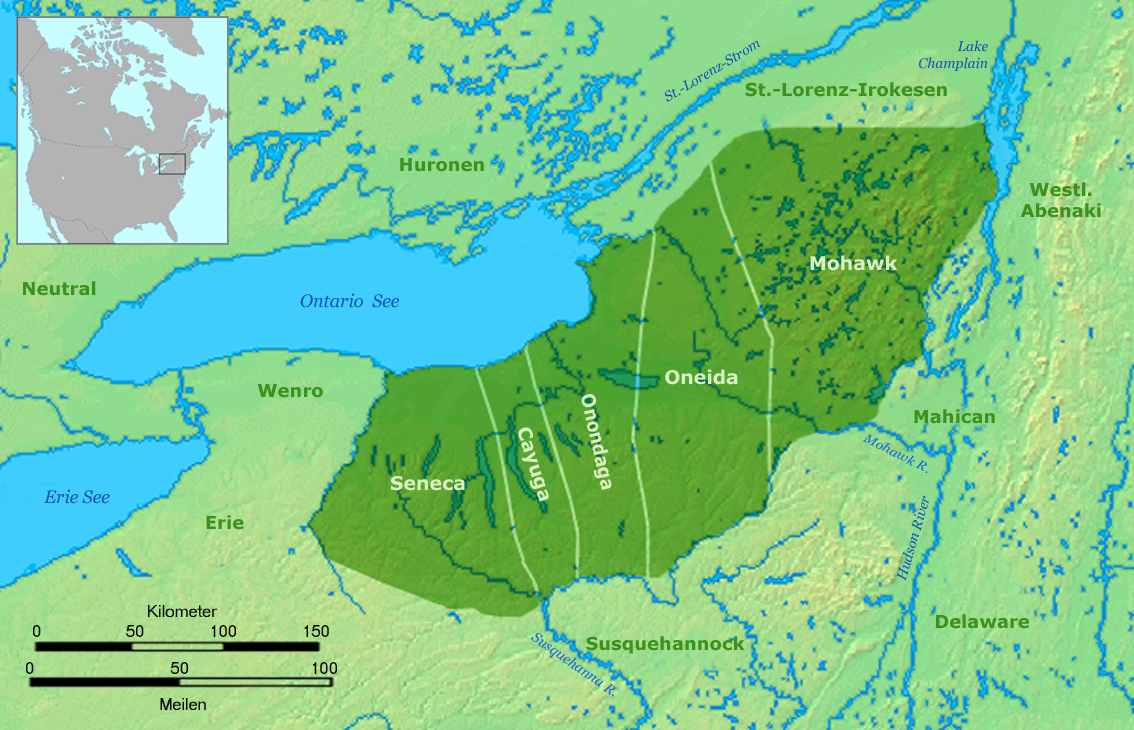
Haudenosaunee Five Nations c. 1650

La Barre left Montreal on 30 July 1684 with 700 militiamen, 400 Indian allies and 150 regular troops, and travelled to Fort Frontenac. He made contact with the Haudenosaunee on 29 August 1684 at a place named Famine Cove (Anse de la Famine) (Note: After the Rivière de l'Assomption on the east of Lake Ontario, from north to south the French called the rivers the Rivière des Sables (Sandy Creek, New York?), Rivière de la Planche, Rivière de la Grande Famine and Rivière de la Petite Famine. According to Père Charlevoix the last two names were given by La Barre.) on Lake Ontario to the northeast of Oswego. His camp was in a marshy location without natural defenses. The force ran out of food and many came down with fever. He met with the Onondaga Haudenosaunee leaders on 2 September 1684. The Jesuit Pierre Millet, who spoke the Iroquois language and had played a leading role in the great Haudenosaunee council in mid-1684 that discussed how to appease the French, joined La Barre's expedition and helped with the negotiations at Anse de La Famine (Mexico Bay). The Onondaga leader Garangula said, "Hear, Yonnondio, take care for the future, that so great a number of soldiers as appear here do not choke the Tree of Peace planted in so small a fort. It will be a great loss, if after it had so easily taken root you should stop its growth and prevent its covering your country and ours with its branches."

The Haudenosaunee made it clear that any peace would be on their terms. They would be willing to hold further discussions at this location rather than Montreal or Quebec, as long as La Barre took his army back to Quebec. They would make peace with the Miamis, but not with France's allies the Illinois. La Barre had no choice but to agree. The expedition had been a disaster for which La Barre was blamed by his Indian allies, the colonists and the French government. 300 soldiers from France arrived at Quebec on almost the same day as La Barre, too late. La Salle had gone back to France and was back in favour with the king and the minister, who returned forts Frontenac and Saint-Louis to him. On 10 March 1685 Louis XIV wrote a letter to Muelles that said La Barre was to be recalled after the shameful peace he had just concluded, replaced by the Marquis de Denonville.

=== Last years (1685–88) ===
La Barre left the colony in August 1685 and retired to France, where he lived on his large fortune without holding any further office. He died in Paris on 4 May 1688. François-Jean de la Barre, known as the Chevalier de la Barre, was his descendant.

== Publications ==
- Sieur le Febure de la Barre (12 April 1664), La France équinoctiale remise soubs l'Obeissance du Roy en l'année 1664 (Map 93.5 by 93 centimetres (36.8 by 36.6 in))
- Sieur le Febure de la Barre (1666), Carte nouvelle de la France équinoctiale faite et présentée à sa Majesté Par le Sieur le Febure de la Barre son Gouverneur son Lieutenant Général en ces Pays au mois de Septembre 1665 (Map 93.5 by 93 centimetres (36.8 by 36.6 in)), Paris: Jean Ribou
- Le Febvre de La Barre (1666), Description de la France equinoctiale, cy-devant appellee Guyanne, et par les Espagnols, el Dorado. Nouvellement remise sous l'obeïssance du Roy, par le sieur Le Febvre de La Barre, son lieutenant general dans ce païs. Avec la carte d'iceluy, faite et presentee à Sa Majeste par ledit sieur de La Barre. Et un discours tres-utile et necessaire pour ceux qui voudront établir des colonies en ces contrées;, p. 52
- I.C.S.D.V.; Le Febvre de La Barre (1671), Relation de ce qui s'est passé dans les Isles & Terre-Ferme de l'Amérique, pendant la dernière guerre avec l'Angleterre, & depuis en exécution du traitté de Bréda. Avec un journal du dernier voyage du S de la Barre en la Terre-Ferme, & Isle de Cayenne, accompagné d'une exacte description du Pays, moeurs & naturel des Habitans. L tour recüeilly des Memoires des principaux Officiers qui ont commandé en ces Pays., vol. 1–2, pp. 384/494

== See also ==
- Henri de Tonti

== Sources ==
- Baugy, Louis Henry, chevalier de; Serrigny, Ernest Hubert Auguste (1883), Journal d'une expédition contre les Iroquois en 1687 (in French), Paris: E. Leroux
- Brandao, Jose Antonio (2000), Your Fyre Shall Burn No More: Iroquois Policy Toward New France and Its Native Allies to 1701, U of Nebraska Press, ISBN 0-8032-6177-2
- Cahoon, Ben, "French Guiana", Worldstatesmen
- Campeau, Lucien (1969), "Millet, Pierre", Dictionary of Canadian Biography, vol. 2, University of Toronto/Université Laval
- Castillo, Susan (16 August 2010), American Literature in Context to 1865, John Wiley & Sons, ISBN 978-1-4051-8864-7
- Chérubini, Bernard (1988), Cayenne, ville créole et polyethnique: essai d'anthropologie urbaine (in French), KARTHALA Editions, ISBN 978-2-86537-200-3
- Dessalles, Pierre Régis (1847), Histoire legislative des Antilles ou Annales du conseil souverain de la Martinique (etc.): 3 (in French), France
- Dubé, Pauline (1993), La Nouvelle-France sous Joseph-Antoine Le Febvre de La Barre, 1682-1685: lettres, mémoires, instructions et ordonnances (in French), Les éditions du Septentrion, ISBN 978-2-921114-98-1
- Eccles, W. J. (2003), Frontenac: The Courtier Governor, U of Nebraska Press, ISBN 0-8032-6750-9
- Fortia, M. le Marquis de (1834), L'art de vérifier les dates ...: t.1-18. L'art de vérifier les dates des faits historiques, des chartes, des chroniques, et autres anciens monuments, depuis la naissance de Notre-Seigneur (in French), J. Denain
- Garric, Alain, "Antoine LE FÈVRE DE LA BARRE", Geneanet (in French)
- Goslinga, Cornelis C. (6 December 2012), A Short History of the Netherlands Antilles and Surinam, Springer Science & Business Media, ISBN 978-94-009-9289-4
- Hulsman, Lodewijk; Van den Bel, Martjin; Cazaelles, Nathalie (December 2015), ""Cayenne hollandaise" Jan Claes Langedijck et Quirijn Spranger (1654-1664)", Karapa 4 (in French), Association AIMARA
- La Roque, Robert. (2000), "Le Febvre de la Barre, Joseph-Antoine", Dictionary of Canadian Biography, vol. 1
- Marley, David (2008), Wars of the Americas: A Chronology of Armed Conflict in the Western Hemisphere, 1492 to the Present, ABC-CLIO, ISBN 978-1-59884-100-8
- Martínez, Alida (10 February 2015), Narrations, Formality and Knowledge in the Maps (Catalogue in English and Spanish of The Prome Encuentro Bienal Arte Contemporaneo di Caribe, Aruba)
- Mercier, Jean Edouard (1 April 2009), "Le XVIIe Siècle" ( (PDF)), L'armée française et la Guyane (in French), Ibis Rouge Editions, ISBN 978-2-84450-350-3, archived from the original on 27 July 2018
- Parkman, Francis (1874), The Discovery of the Great West, Little, Brown
- Pouliot, Léon (1969), "Garnier, Julien", Dictionary of Canadian Biography, vol. 2, University of Toronto/Université Laval
- Psalmon, Serge (2003), Hélices, Tuyères et Palétuviers (in French), Editions Publibook, ISBN 978-2-7483-0196-0
- Ronsseray, Céline (November 2005), De l'aventurier au " fonctionnaire " ou la transformation de l'administrateur colonial au XVIIIe siècle en Guyane française (Actes du 1er Congrès du GIS Amérique latine : Discours et pratiques de pouvoir en Amérique latine, de la période précolombienne à nos jours, 3-4 novembre 2005), Université de La Rochelle
- Roux, Yannick Le; Auger, Réginald; Cazelles, Nathalie (2009), Loyola: L'Habitation des Jésuites de Rémire en Guyane Française (in French), PUQ, ISBN 978-2-7605-2451-4
- Roy, Joseph Edmond (1907), "Antoine-Lefebvre, Sieur de la Barre", The Catholic Encyclopedia, vol. 2, New York: Robert Appleton Company
- Southey, Robert (1819), History of Brazil, Longman, Hurst, Rees, and Orme
- Southey, Captain Thomas (1827), Chronological History of the West Indies, vol. I, London: Longman, Rees, Orme, Brown, & Green, ISBN 978-1-136-99066-3
- Zoltvany, Yves F. (2003), "Greysolon Dulhut, Daniel", Dictionary of Canadian Biography, vol. 2, University of Toronto/Université Laval
