= Antoine de Noël de la Trompe d'Or =

Acting Governor of Cayenne
- In office February 1665 – October 1665
- Preceded by: Antoine Lefèbvre de La Barre
- Succeeded by: Cyprien Lefebvre de Lézy

Personal details
- Occupation: Soldier

Antoine de Noël de la Trompe d'Or was a French soldier who was acting governor of Cayenne in 1665. Little is otherwise known of his life.

== Background ==
Antoine Lefèbvre de La Barre left the port of La Rochelle, France, on 26 February 1664 with two warships and 400 soldiers. He arrived in Cayenne on 11 May 1664, and after negotiations the Dutch surrendered on 16 May 1664. De La Barre established a garrison at Fort Cépérou and started construction of a settlement of 200 huts. On 11 July 1664 Jean-Baptiste Colbert, with the king's agreement, founded the Compagnie des Indes occidentales. De La Barre was appointed Lieutenant General of the Company and Governor of Cayenne. His brother, the Chevalier de Lézy, was named lieutenant.

== Acting governor ==
In February 1665 the ship La Suzanne arrived in Cayenne with 180 men. De La Barre learned from the ship that Colbert had merged into one all the companies created to exploit the various French possessions in America. De la Barre set off for France. He left Noël de La Trompe d’Or, esquire and commissioner of war, in charge of Guiana. Noël de la Trompe d'Or took possession of Montagne d'Argent and Sinnamary. In France De la Barre was promoted lieutenant general of the new company and governor of Cayenne. He had his brother named commander of Cayenne and sent him there at once. The Chevalier de Lézy arrived in October 1665 and succeeded Noël.

A note in the Jesuit archives says that "Monsieur Noël returned to his post at Sinnamary, from where after a short time he was kidnapped by English privateers". This may refer to Antoine Noël de la Trompe d'Or.

== Sources ==
- Mercier, Jean Edouard (1 April 2009), "Le XVIIe Siècle", L'armée française et la Guyane (PDF) (in French), Ibis Rouge Editions, ISBN 978-2-84450-350-3, archived from the original (PDF) on 2018-07-27
- Mousse, Jean de La (2006), Les indiens de la Sinnamary: journal du père Jean de La Mousse en Guyane, 1684-1691 (in French), Editions Chandeigne, ISBN 978-2-915540-09-3
- Psalmon, Serge (2003), Hélices, Tuyères et Palétuviers (in French), Editions Publibook, ISBN 978-2-7483-0196-0
- Thibaudault, Pierre (1995), Echec de la Démesure en Guyane (PDF) (in French), Imprimerie Pairault S.A., ISBN 2-9509152-0-5
