= Louis-Henri de Baugy, Chevalier de Baugy =

French noble

Louis-Henri de Baugy, Chevalier de Baugy (died 1720) was from a noble family of France and came to New France as a member of the party of Joseph-Antoine de La Barre, who was replacing Buade de Frontenac as Governor General.

Chevalier de Baugy arrived at Quebec in 1682 and immediately became involved in the fur trade of the Great Lakes; namely, putting an end to the dominant position of Cavelier de La Salle in that area. Under La Barre's authority, de Baugy took control of Fort Saint Louis (Illinois) on the Illinois River from Henri Tonty in 1683. In February, 1684, the fort was besieged by a force of 500 Iroquois for eight days. Despite limited ammunition and provisions, the defenders withstood three assaults, and the Iroquois were forced to abandon their attacks and withdraw the way they had come. In 1685, La Salle was given back control of Fort Saint Louis by the French king.

De Baugy took part in at least one more campaign in Canada, in 1687 with Denonville against the Senecas. De Baugy, as Denonville's aide-de-camp, left a valuable journal of his experiences during the expedition. In 1689, he left for France and did not return.
