= Antoine Le Moyne de Châteauguay =

Canadian politician

Governor of Louisiana
- In office 1725–1725
- Preceded by: Pierre Sidrac Dugué de Boisbriant
- Succeeded by: Étienne Perier

Governor of French Guiana
- In office 9 July 1738 – June 1743
- Preceded by: Gilbert Guillouet d'Orvilliers
- Succeeded by: Gilbert Guillouet d'Orvilliers

Governor of Île Royale
- In office 1745–1747
- Preceded by: Louis Dupont du Chambon
- Succeeded by: Sir Charles Knowles, 1st Baronet

Personal details
- Born: 17 July 1683 Montreal, New France
- Died: 21 March 1747 (aged 63) Rochefort, Charente-Maritime, France
- Occupation: Soldier, colonial administrator

Antoine Le Moyne de Châteauguay (French pronunciation: [ɑ̃twan lə mwan də ʃatoɡɛ]; or Antoine Lemoyne, seigneur de Chateaugué; 17 July 1683 – 21 March 1747) was a French soldier and colonial administrator who assisted in the foundation of the French colony of Louisiana in 1699–1702. He served in various posts in Mobile, Louisiana and Martinique. He was governor of Cayenne (French Guiana) from 1738 to 1743, then governor of Île Royale (Cape Breton) from 1745.

== Family and youth (1683–98) ==
Antoine Le Moyne de Châteauguay was born on 17 July 1683 in Montreal, French Canada. His parents were Charles Le Moyne (1626–85), seigneur de Longueil, a soldier, interpreter and merchant, and Catherine Thierry. His father had emigrated from France to Canada in 1640. His father had served in the war with the Iroquois and helped considerably in pacifying New France and defending its frontiers. Antoine Le Moyne was the eleventh and youngest son of Charles Le Moyne, who also had two daughters. Ten of these sons served France with distinction in the colonies, while one died young. The third son, Pierre Le Moyne d'Iberville (1661–1706) is perhaps the best known. Antoine Le Moyne succeeded his brother Louis Le Moyne (1676–94) as sieur de Chateauguay when Louis was killed in 1694. He joined the navy as a midshipman.

== Louisiana expedition (1698–1702) ==
Châteauguay accompanied his brother Iberville on an expedition to the lower Mississippi valley that left Brest in 1698 and anchored in Mobile Bay on 31 January 1699. Three others brothers were on this expedition, Joseph Le Moyne de Sérigny (1668–1734), Gabriel Le Moyne d'Assigny (born 1681), and Jean-Baptiste Le Moyne de Bienville (1680–1768). As leader of the expedition, Iberville is known as the founder of the colony of Louisiana. Châteauguay helped Bienville establish Fort La Boulaye on the lower Mississippi in 1700. In 1702 he was given command of the fort and warehouse on Dauphin Island at the entrance to Mobile Bay. In 1702 Iberville and Bienville founded the city of Mobile, capital of the new colony. Châteauguay was made a captain in Louisiana in 1703.

== Later career (1703–47) ==
Châteauguay married Marie Jeanne Emilie des Fredailles. In a memorial written by Bienville at New Orleans on 25 January 1723 he states that only four of the brothers were still alive: himself, Baron de Longueil, Serigny and Chateauguay. All of them were Knights of the Order of Saint Louis. For a few months in 1725 Châteauguay was governor of Louisiana. He replaced Pierre Sidrac Dugué de Boisbriant, and was in turn replaced by Étienne Perier.

In 1727 Châteauguay was appointed king's lieutenant at Fort Saint Pierre^{(fr)} in Martinique. He took office as governor of Cayenne on 9 July 1738, replacing the commandant Gilbert Guillouet d'Orvilliers. Châteauguay left for France in June 1743 and d'Orvilliers took over again as head of the colony. Châteauguay was appointed governor of Île Royale (Cape Breton) in 1745, but died before taking office. He died in Rochefort, Charente-Maritime, on 21 March 1747 at the age of 63.

In August 2014 it was reported that a group of cyclists wanted to rename Three Mile Creek in Mobile to Bayou Chateauguay, which they said was the name given to it by the early French colonists after Antoine de Chateauguay.

== Notes ==
Political offices
Preceded by Louis Du Pont Duchambon de Vergor	Governor of Île-Royale; 1745	Surrendered to British governor Sir Charles Knowles
