= Jacques Dewatre =

French diplomat and politician (1936–2021)

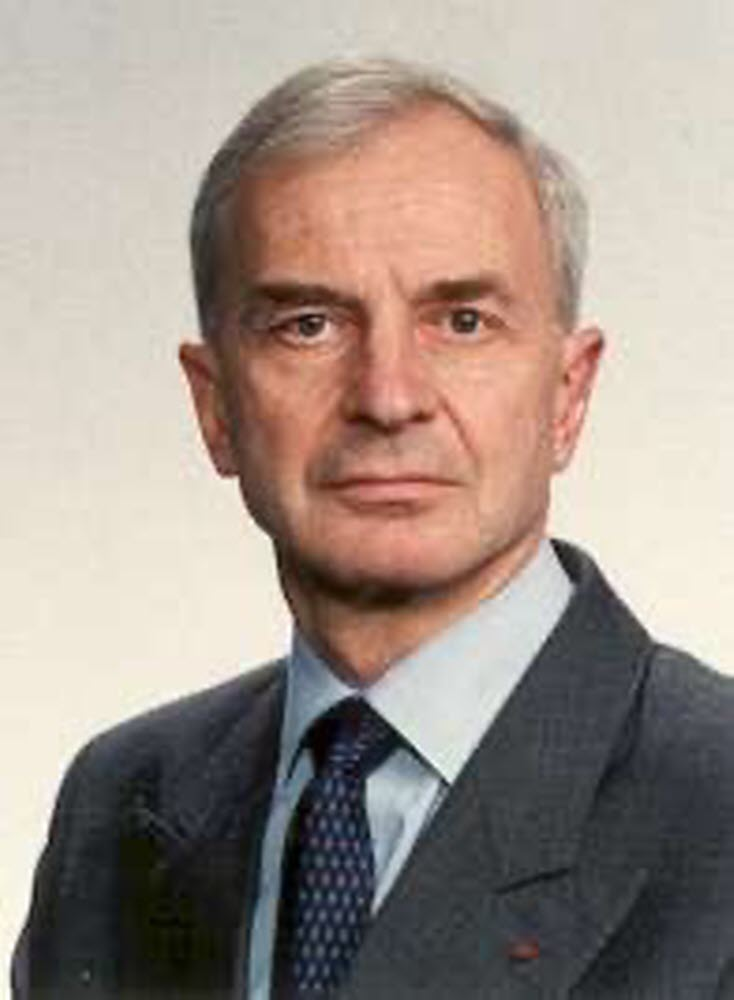

France Ambassador to Ethiopia
- In office 15 March 2000 – 9 July 2001
- Preceded by: Alain Rouquié
- Succeeded by: Josette Dallant

Director-General for External Security
- In office 4 June 1993 – 13 February 2000
- Preceded by: Claude Silberzahn
- Succeeded by: Jean-Claude Cousseran

Prefect of Réunion
- In office 19 July 1991 – December 1992
- Preceded by: Daniel Constantin
- Succeeded by: Hubert Fournier

Prefect of Saône-et-Loire
- In office 1988 – 19 July 1991
- Preceded by: Yves Mourès
- Succeeded by: Jean-Claude Roure

Personal details
- Born: 5 June 1936 Limoges, France
- Died: 14 December 2021 (aged 85) Clamart, France

Jacques Dewatre (5 June 1936 – 14 December 2021) was a French diplomat and politician. He served as Director-General for External Security from 1993 to 2000.

== Biography ==
Dewatre studied at the École spéciale militaire de Saint-Cyr and became a parachutist. After fifteen years in the military, he joined the prefectural body in 1974. He became a sub-prefect in Aude, Haute-Savoie, and French Polynesia. He then served as prefect of French Guiana from 1986 to 1988, Saône-et-Loire from 1988 to 1991, and Réunion from 1991 to 1992. He served as Director-General for External Security from 1993 to 2000. From 15 March 2000 to 9 July 2001, he served as France's ambassador to Ethiopia.

He died following a long illness at Hôpital d'instruction des armées Percy in Clamart, on 14 December 2021, at the age of 85.

== Distinctions ==
- Grand-Officer of the National Order of the Legion of Honour
- Grand-Officer of the National Order of Merit
