= Cyprien Lefebvre de Lézy =

Cyprien Lefebvre de la Barre, chevalier de Lézy

Governor of Cayenne
- In office 1665 – 23 September 1667
- Preceded by: Antoine de Noël de la Trompe d'Or
- Succeeded by: Jean Morellet (de Facto) then Antoine Lefèbvre de La Barre

Governor of Cayenne
- In office 1670 – March 1679
- Preceded by: Antoine Lefèbvre de La Barre
- Succeeded by: Pierre-Eléonore de La Ville

Personal details
- Born: 16 December 1643
- Died: March 1687 (aged 43) Malta

Cyprien Lefebvre de la Barre, chevalier de Lézy (16 December 1643 – March 1687), or Cyprien Lefèvre, Le Febvre, was governor of the French colony of Cayenne (French Guiana) from 1665 to 1667, and again from 1670 to 1679. During his term of office the colony was raided first by the English and then by the Dutch.

== Family ==
Cyprien Lefebvre was born on 16 December 1643. (Note: An 1896 source says Cyprien Lefebvre, Knight of Malta and brother of Antoine Lefebvre, was born on 16 December 1643 and died in Malta in March 1687. Another source says Cyprien Lefebvre, Knight of Malta and brother of Antoine Lefebvre, was born in 1645. If these sources are correct and refer to the subject of this article, he was born twenty years after his brother, and became governor of Cayenne aged 20 or 22.) His father was Antoine Lefebvre (died 1669), sieur de la Barre, a counselor in parliament and provost of the merchants of Paris. His mother was Madeleine Belin. His eldest brother was Antoine Lefèbvre de La Barre (1622–1688), governor of Cayenne from May 1664 to June 1665. In 1665 the French Minister Jean-Baptiste Colbert commissioned Antoine Lefebvre de La Barre as the king's governor of the American Mainland. He was later governor of Cayenne for the king from 1668 to 1670 and governor general of New France from 1682 to 1685. The family dynasty ended with Antoine's son, François Lefebvre de La Barre, who was governor of Cayenne from 1687 until his death in 1691.

== First term of office (1665–67) ==
Antoine Lefebvre left Cayenne for France in 1665 and obtained the appointment of Cyprien as governor from the newly created Royal West Indies Company (Compagnie Royale des Indes Occidentales). Cyprien Lefebvre was governor of Cayenne from 1665 to 1668. He replaced the acting governor Antoine de Noël de la Trompe d'Or, who left office on 8 September 1655.

On 20 June 1665 Lefebvre ceded a 2,000 by 1,000 feet (610 by 300 m) property in Cayenne to Joseph-Fortuné Pignon, vicomte de Quincy. This became the property of the Jesuits in 1668 and their base in the colony.

In 1666 the English commanded by Captain Peter Wroth visited the colony of Cayenne but did not harm Lefèvre. Cayenne was looted by the British under the command of Rear-Admiral Sir John Harman in August 1667. The English destroyed Fort Cépérou and the town of Cayenne. Lefebvre left on 23 September 1667. From December 1667 the Jesuit father Jean Morellet was the de facto governor. After peace was restored in 1668 Lefebvre's brother Joseph-Antoine de La Barre returned, and held office until 1670.

== Second term of office (1670–79) ==
Cyprien Lefebvre again took charge of Cayenne in 1670, and held office until March 1679. He was commander from 1670 to 1675, then governor from 1675 to 1679. On 21 May 1671 he was received as a Knight of Malta and made a lieutenant general. He was governor of the French West India Company in 1674, when its possessions were returned to the king.

In the spring of 1676 the Dutch captain Jacob Binckes was promoted to vice-admiral and dispatched to the West Indies with a fleet of seven men of war and six other ships. He arrived at Cayenne on 4 May 1676 and landed 900 troops near Fort Saint Louis (Fort Cépérou) the next day. Lefebvre soon surrendered. Binckes left shortly after for Marie-Galante and Tobago, leaving a small force to hold Cayenne. The Dutch commander Binkes controlled the colony from 5 May 1676 to 20 December 1676. The Dutch left in December, defeated by the Comte Jean II d'Estrées. In 1679 Lefebvre was replaced as governor by Pierre-Eléonore de La Ville, marquis de Férolles. Cyprien Lefebvre died in Malta in March 1687.

== Sources ==
- Bogaers, M-L (July–August 2000), "PINON de QUINCY", Généalogie et Histoire de la Caraïbe (128)
- Cahoon, Ben, "French Guiana", Worldstatesmen
- Chérubini, Bernard (1988), Cayenne, ville créole et polyethnique: essai d'anthropologie urbaine (in French), KARTHALA Editions, ISBN 978-2-86537-200-3
- d'Est-Ange, C. (1903), Dictionnaire des familles françaises anciennes ou notables à la fin du XIXe siècle, Evreux: C. Hérissey
- Gouffroy, G.F. (June 1896), "LA FAMILLE LEFEBVRE DE LA BARRE" (PDF), Bulletin des Recherches Historiques (in French), 2
- Hulsman, Lodewijk; Van den Bel, Martjin; Cazaelles, Nathalie (December 2015), ""Cayenne hollandaise" Jan Claes Langedijck et Quirijn Spranger (1654-1664)", Karapa 4 (in French), Association AIMARA
- Marley, David (2008), Wars of the Americas: A Chronology of Armed Conflict in the Western Hemisphere, 1492 to the Present, ABC-CLIO, ISBN 978-1-59884-100-8
- Pritchard, James S. (2004-01-22), In Search of Empire: The French in the Americas, 1670-1730, Cambridge University Press, ISBN 978-0-521-82742-3
- Ronsseray, Céline (2007), "Administrer Cayenne": Sociabilités, fidélités et pouvoirs des fonctionnaires coloniaux en Guyane française au XVIIIe siècle. Histoire. (PDF) (in French), Université de La Rochelle
- Roux, Yannick Le; Auger, Réginald; Cazelles, Nathalie (2009), Loyola: L'Habitation des Jésuites de Rémire en Guyane Française (in French), PUQ, ISBN 978-2-7605-2451-4
