= Gilbert Guillouet d'Orvilliers =

French commander and governor of the French Guiana in the 18th century

Gilbert Guillouet, seigneur d'Orvilliers

Commandant of French Guiana
- In office June 1730 – 2 August 1730
- Preceded by: Michel Marschalck
- Succeeded by: Henry Dussault

Commandant of French Guiana
- In office December 1736. – 9 July 1738
- Preceded by: Henry de Poilvillain
- Succeeded by: Antoine Lemoyne

Commandant of French Guiana
- In office June 1743 – 27 November 1749
- Preceded by: Antoine Lemoyne

Governor of French Guiana
- In office 27 November 1749 – May 1763
- Succeeded by: Jean-Pierre-Antoine de Behague

Personal details
- Born: c. 1708
- Died: 11 May 1764
- Occupation: Soldier

Gilbert Guillouet, seigneur d'Orvilliers (c. 1708 – 11 May 1764) was a French soldier who was commander of French Guiana from 1730 to 1763, and governor of French Guiana from 1749 to 1763. At the time the colony was struggling for survival, dependent on slave labour to extract sugar and other products.

== Family ==
The Guillouet d’Orvilliers family was from the Bourbonnais region. The family made strategic marriages with the most efficient military families of Rochefort, Charente-Maritime, and the French colonies in America. Gilbert's grandfather, Rémy Guillouet, seigneur d'Orvilliers, married Marie Lefèvre de La Barre, daughter of Antoine Lefèbvre de La Barre, first governor of Cayenne in the 17th century. This marriage led to Rémy Guillouet becoming governor of the colony at the start of the 18th century. Rémy Guillouet was the king's lieutenant in Cayenne, and administered the colony from January 1700 to the end of 1701 in the absence of the governor, Pierre-Eléonore de La Ville de Férolles. Rémy Guillouet d'Orvilliers was governor of French Guiana from 15 September 1706 to July 1713.

Gilbert Guillouet d'Orvilliers was born around 1708. His parents were Claude Guillouet d'Orvilliers (c. 1670–1740), seigneur d'Orvilliers, and Claude de Vict de Pongibaud (c. 1680–1759). His younger brother Louis Guillouet d'Orvilliers (1710–1792), Comte d'Orvilliers, became an admiral of the French navy. His father was a capitaine de frégate who was governor of Guiana from September 1716 until his death in December 1729. After Claude Guillouet d'Orvilliers died Michel Marschalck, sieur de Charanville, enseigne de vaisseau and the king's lieutenant, was commandant of French Guiana until June 1730.

== Commandant of French Guiana (1730–49) ==
Gilbert d'Orvilliers was the king's commandant of French Guiana from 1730 to 1763. He held the rank of major. He was head of the colony from June 1730 until the arrival of the new governor Henry Dussault, seigneur de Lamirande, on 2 August 1730. Dussault died on 30 August 1736 and was succeeded by Henry de Poilvillain, who died in December 1736. D'Orvilliers was then again head of the colony until 9 July 1738, when Antoine Lemoyne, seigneur de Chateaugué, took office as governor. Lemoyne, a naval commissary, was ordonnateur (head of civil administration) from 1738 to 1762. Lemoyne left for France in June 1743 and d'Orvilliers took over as head of the colony.

In 1748 d'Orvilliers and a M. des Essarts, navy controller, undertook an exploratory land voyage from Cayenne to the Approuague and the Oyapock. In December 1748 d'Orvilliers and Lemoyne co-authored a Mémoire concernant la colonie de Cayenne addressed to the French government. In glowing terms the report described the fertility of Cayenne, where planters could easily grow sugar cane, indigo, annatto, cotton and food. Lumber for carpentry and construction was plentiful, as were medicinal plants and trees, spices, resins, gums, oils and fruits. Goods could be carried from the interior to the coast by river, and the main rivers could easily be connected to form an inland waterway from the Oyapock to the Maroni. All that was lacking were the colonists to exploit these resources. At this time the colony had only 600 whites and 7,000 slaves, and d'Orvilliers saw this lack of inhabitants as the main reason for the "languishing state" of the colony.

== Governor of French Guiana (1749–63) ==
From 27 November 1749 d'Orvilliers was officially governor of Cayenne. He took leave from June 1751 to May 1752, when Jean-Baptiste-Hyacinthe de Saint-Michel Dunezat acted as commander. D'Orvilliers returned and administered from May 1752 to July 1753, when he again took leave and was again replaced by Jean-Baptiste Dunezat. In December 1756 d'Orvilliers made a second marriage with Renée Justine de Brach, daughter of François Louis de Brach, lord of Esnandes, a naval officer and governor of Martinique in 1728. D'Orvilliers returned to Cayenne in April 1757.

When the intendant Lemoyne was asked to provide a chart of prices in Cayenne in 1756 he was not able to, saying that barter was the only form of trade. He also said that slaves from Guinea had only come to Guiana by chance. The last two ships had straggled in with "infected cargo ... reduced to less than half by sickness and want of supplies." Cash, which would attract slave traders, was essential to the survival of the colony. The Seven Years' War (1756–63) further restricted trade.

In 1759 d'Orvilliers manned the fortifications of Cayenne with slaves to defend against British invaders, an unusual and controversial step. The king would pay for any slave that was killed or mutilated, so d'Orvilliers asked that the nearby plantations supply their best men. The planters objected to the cost, and some objected on military grounds. Lemoyne wrote that, "Exposing our slaves to ... a capitulation would create an object too attractive to hope for any mercy from the enemy." Lemoyne proposed instead to burn down Cayenne, retreat to the interior, and from there harass the British with guerilla raids. The whites would raid in the day and the slaves by night. Towards the end of the war, in 1762 there were only 125 whites in Cayenne who could bear arms.

D'Orvilliers remained governor until May 1763, when he was replaced by Jean-Pierre-Antoine de Behague. He returned to France with a pension of 4000 livres. He died on 11 May 1764 in Rochefort, aged about 56. He was a knight of the Order of Saint Louis.

== Sources ==
- Annuaire de la Guyanne française: 1876 (in French), Imprimerie du Gouvernement, 1876
- Fortia, M. le Marquis de (1834), L'art de vérifier les dates ...: t.1-18. L'art de vérifier les dates des faits historiques, des chartes, des chroniques, et autres anciens monuments, depuis la naissance de Notre-Seigneur (in French), J. Denain
- Garric, Alain, "Gilbert GUILLOUET D'ORVILLIERS", Geneanet (in French)
- Hodson, Christopher (2012-06-01), The Acadian Diaspora: An Eighteenth-Century History, Oxford University Press, ISBN 978-0-19-991081-6
- Nouvion, Victor de (1844), Extraits des auteurs et voyageurs qui ont écrit sur la Guyane: suivis du Catalogue bibliographique de la Guyane (in French), Béthune et Plon
- Ronsseray, Céline (November 2005), De l'aventurier au " fonctionnaire " ou la transformation de l'administrateur colonial au XVIIIe siècle en Guyane française (Actes du 1er Congrès du GIS Amérique latine : Discours et pratiques de pouvoir en Amérique latine, de la période précolombienne à nos jours, 3-4 novembre 2005), Université de La Rochelle
