= Louis-Thomas Jacau de Fiedmont =

Artillery officer in New France

Louis-Thomas Jacau de Fiedmont (sometimes Jacault or Jacob) (c. 1723 – 25 August 1788) was a Canadian artillery officer. Jacau joined the French army as a non-commissioned officer and became a cadet in 1743 in the gunners of Île Royale. He traveled to France and, in 1747, was captured by the British. In 1748 he was promoted to ensign and returned to Canada in 1750. In 1753 he was promoted to lieutenant and given command of the artillery in Acadia. In 1757 he was promoted to captain. In 1760 he was a made a knight of the Order of Saint Louis.

In 1762 Jacau was promoted to lieutenant-colonel and sent to French Guiana and in 1765 was appointed governor of that colony. Jacau was promoted twice more, to infantry brigadier in 1769 and major-general in 1780. As governor, he pursued a policy of encouraging French Canadians who had fled the British to settle in French Guiana.
