= Claude Silberzahn =

French civil servant (1935–2020)

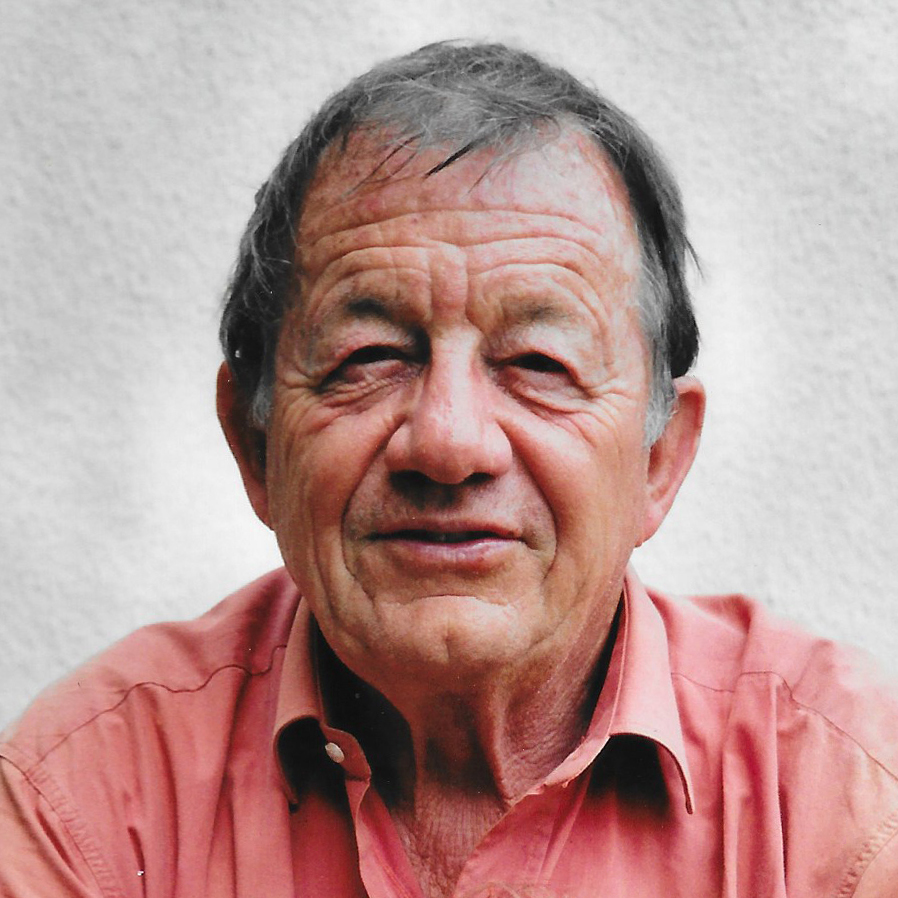
- Born: 18 March 1935; Mulhouse, France
- Died: 18 April 2020 (aged 85); Simorre, France
- Occupation: Civil Servant

Claude Silberzahn (18 March 1935 – 18 April 2020) was a French high civil servant.

Silberzahn was Prefect of French Guiana (1982–84), of Seine-Maritime (1985-86, with jurisdiction over the region of Haute-Normandie) and Doubs (1986–89, with jurisdiction over the region of Franche-Comté).

He was Director-General of DGSE, the French external intelligence agency, from 23 March 1989 to 7 June 1993.

He was mayor of Simorre, a village in Gers department, from 2001 to 2014.

He died on 18 April 2020.
