= Riguepeu =

- Commune
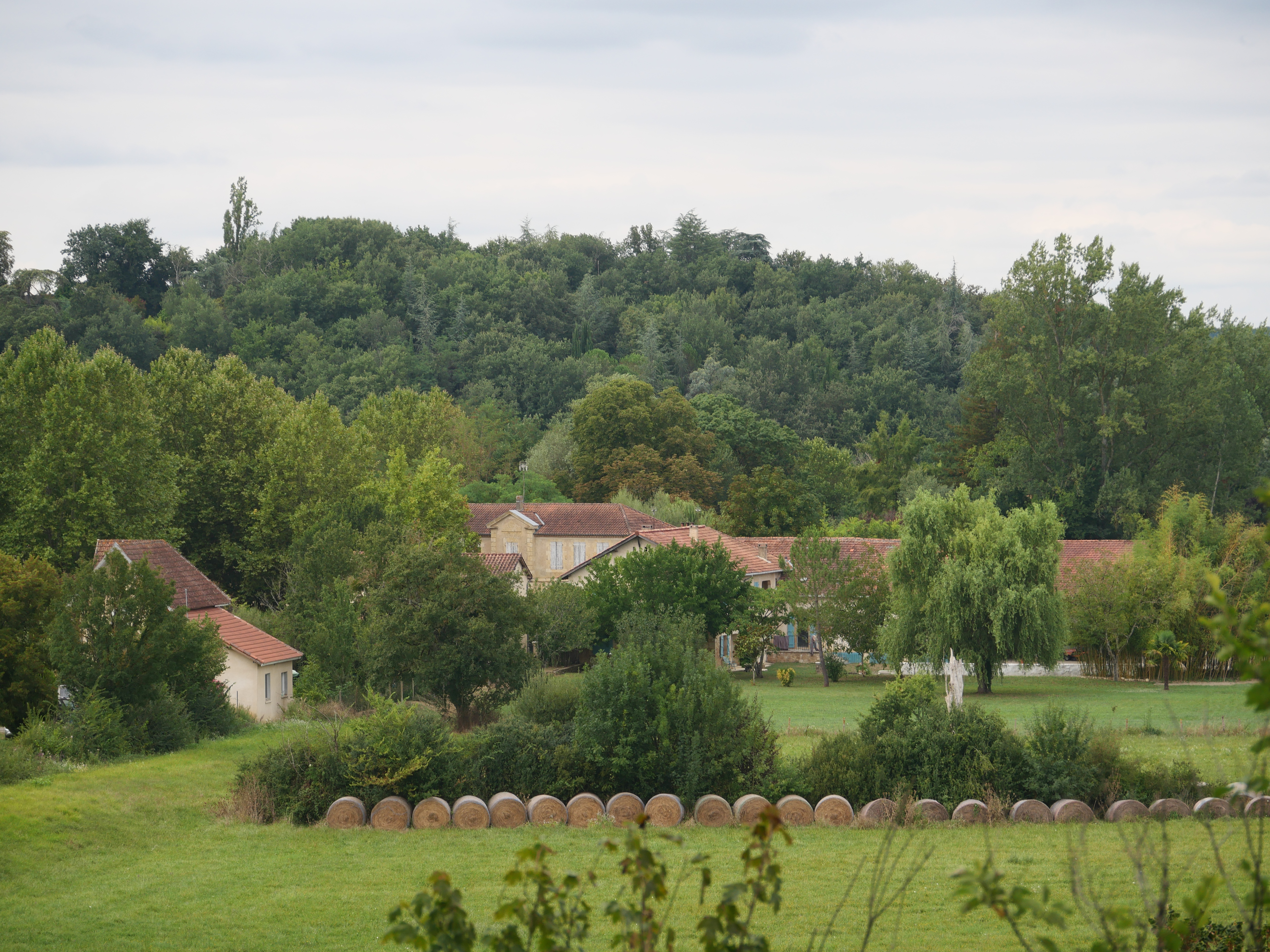
- General view of Riguepeu.
- Location of Riguepeu
- Location within France Location within Occitanie
- Coordinates: 43°39′00″N 0°20′39″E
- Country: France
- Region: Occitania
- Department: Gers
- Arrondissement: Auch
- Canton: Fezensac
- Intercommunality: Artagnan en Fézensac

Government
  - Mayor (2020–2026): Nadine Arqué
- Area^{1}: 21.52 km^{2} (8.31 sq mi)
- Elevation: 140 m (460 ft)
- Highest elevation: 241 m (791 ft)
- Lowest elevation: 123 m (404 ft)
- Population (2023): 164
  - Density: 7.62/km^{2} (19.7/sq mi)
- Time zone: UTC+01:00 (CET)
  - Summer (DST): UTC+02:00 (CEST)
- INSEE/Postal code: 32343 /32320
- ^{1} French Land Register data, which excludes lakes, ponds, glaciers > 1 km^{2} (0.386 sq mi or 247 acres) and river estuaries.

Riguepeu (French pronunciation: [ʁiɡ.pø]; Occitan: Rigapeu) is a commune in Gers, France.

== Geography ==
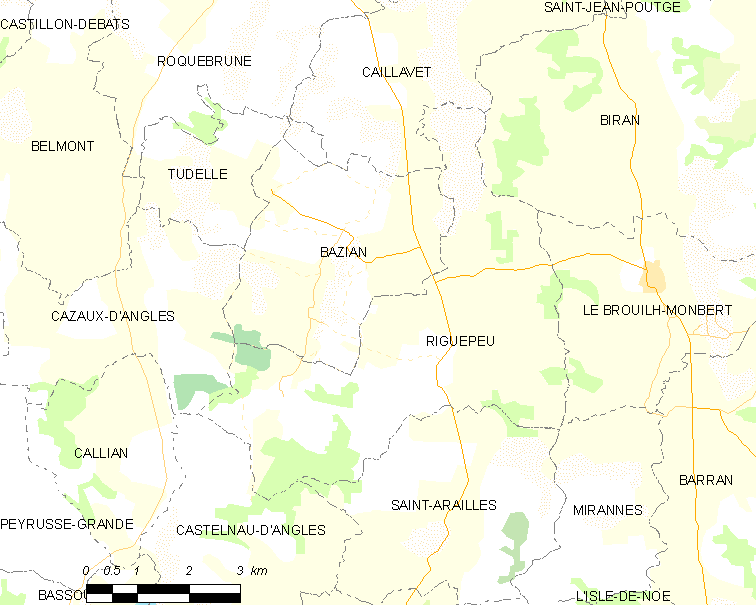
Riguepeu and its surrounding communes

== Population ==
Historical population
Year	Pop.	±% p.a.
1968	262	—
1975	220	−2.47%
1982	219	−0.07%
1990	228	+0.50%
1999	216	−0.60%
2007	225	+0.51%
2012	209	−1.46%
2017	204	−0.48%
2023	164	−3.57%
Source: INSEE

== See also ==
- Communes of the Gers department
