= Couvron-et-Aumencourt =

- Commune
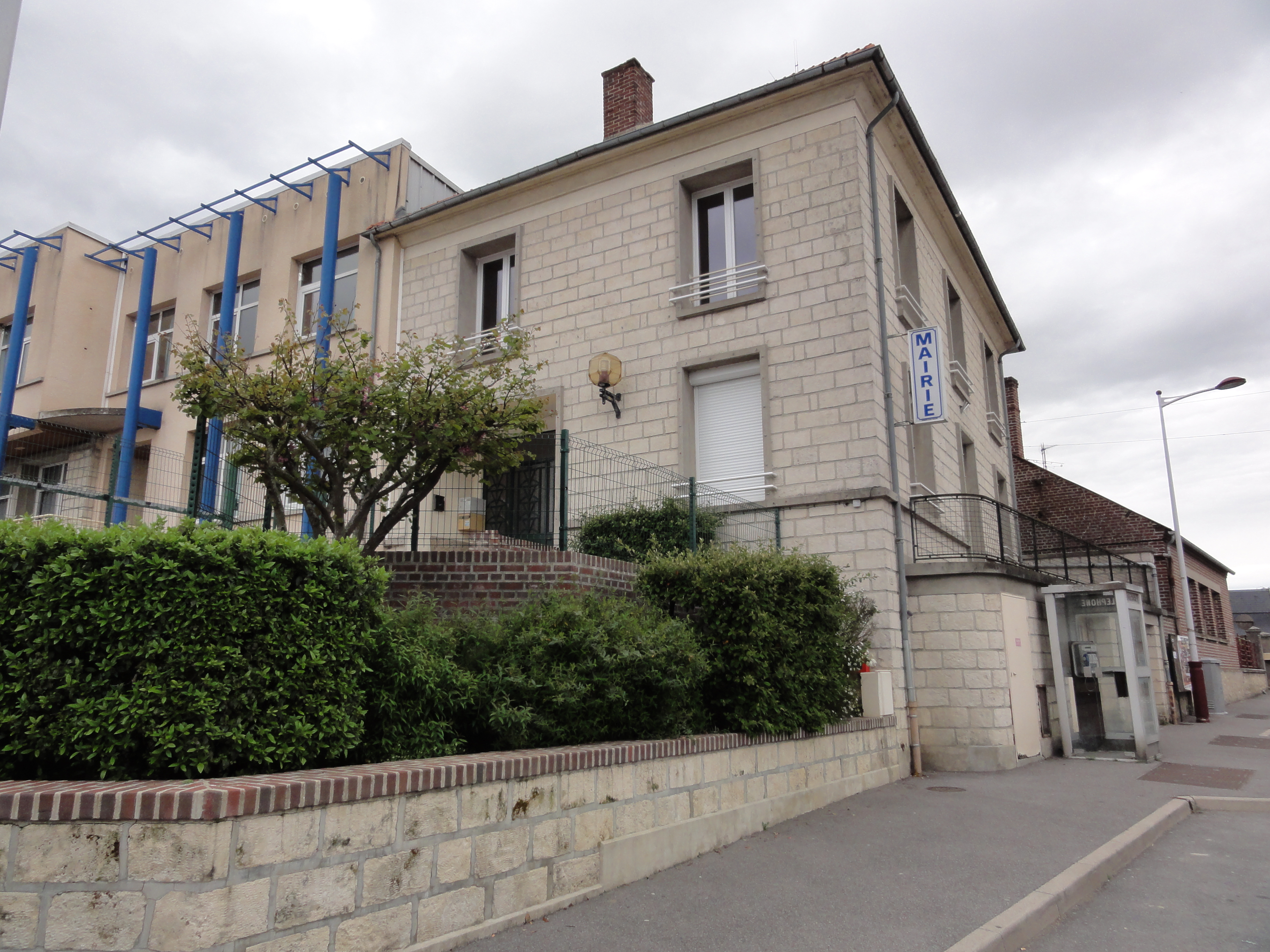
- The town hall of Couvron-et-Aumencourt
- Location of Couvron-et-Aumencourt
- Location within France Location within Hauts-de-France
- Coordinates: 49°38′37″N 3°31′03″E
- Country: France
- Region: Hauts-de-France
- Department: Aisne
- Arrondissement: Laon
- Canton: Marle
- Intercommunality: CC Pays de la Serre

Government
  - Mayor (2026–32): Grégory Coignoux
- Area^{1}: 13.33 km^{2} (5.15 sq mi)
- Elevation: 66 m (217 ft)
- Highest elevation: 91 m (299 ft)
- Lowest elevation: 60 m (200 ft)
- Population (2023): 926
  - Density: 69.5/km^{2} (180/sq mi)
- Time zone: UTC+01:00 (CET)
  - Summer (DST): UTC+02:00 (CEST)
- INSEE/Postal code: 02231 /02270
- ^{1} French Land Register data, which excludes lakes, ponds, glaciers > 1 km^{2} (0.386 sq mi or 247 acres) and river estuaries.

Couvron-et-Aumencourt (French pronunciation: [kuvʁɔ̃ e omɑ̃kuʁ]) is a commune in the Aisne department in Hauts-de-France in northern France.

== Population ==
Historical population
Year	Pop.	±% p.a.
1968	590	—
1975	666	+1.75%
1982	697	+0.65%
1990	899	+3.23%
1999	1,015	+1.36%
2007	1,376	+3.88%
2012	1,151	−3.51%
2017	938	−4.01%
2023	926	−0.21%
Source: INSEE

== See also ==
- Communes of the Aisne department
