= Étienne Franconie =

Provisional agent of the Directory in French Guiana

Vice-agent of the Directory of Guiana
- In office November 1799 – January 1800
- Preceded by: Étienne-Laurent-Pierre Burnel
- Succeeded by: Victor Hugues

Personal details
- Born: 1731
- Died: 1805 (aged 73–74)

Étienne Franconie (1731 – 1805) was a French president of the Departmental Administration of French Guiana. He was French Guiana's provisional agent of the Directory in 1799-1800.

== Biography ==
Étienne Franconie was born in 1731.

Franconie was hostile to the Colonial Assembly in 1790, but later joined it.

He was close to deportees from France; namely, Laffon de Ladébat and La Villeurnoys.

In late 1799, Franconie led angry colonists to force French Guiana's agent, Burnel, to disband the black battalion, stop the state of siege and the requisitions. Burnel was removed from his functions after swearing vengeance and sent back to France. Franconie took power under the title of vice-agent of the Directory.

Franconie ruled from November 1799 until Victor Hugues' arrival in early January 1800 (Hugues was named agent of the Directory of Guiana in August 1799). He received assistance from Laffon de Ladébat, François Barbé-Marbois, Paguenaut, Ménard and Laborde. His first act as vice-agent was to empty Cayenne of its black denizens, with only partial success. Franconie brought back order, respect of the law and regular tax collection in French Guiana.

Slaves captured by privateers arriving in Cayenne on 4 January 1800 were forced to work on plantations.

Franconie died in 1805.

== Legacy ==
Étienne Franconie is also known for his famous descendants. The Franconie Library is named after his son, Alexandre Franconie, whose collection of 6,000 books was donated to the library. His grandson Gustave Franconie was a deputy at the French Chamber of Deputies for Guiana. Another grandson, Élie Franconie, was the first elected mayor of Cayenne.
