= Louis-Marie-François Tardy de Montravel =

French navigator explorer and administrator

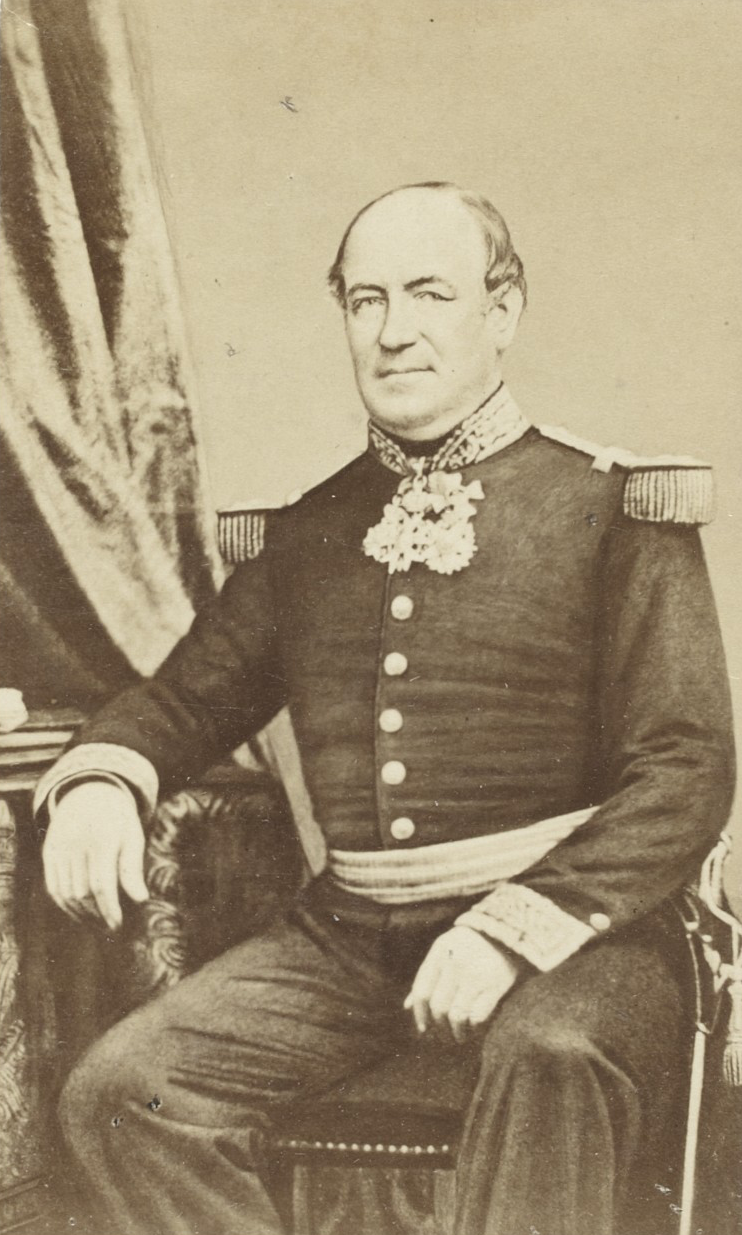
- Born: 28 September 1811; Vincennes, Val-de-Marne, France
- Died: 4 October 1864 (aged 53); Elbeuf, Seine-Maritime, France
- Military career
- Allegiance: France
- Branch: French Navy
- Service years: 1833–1864
- Rank: Rear-Admiral
- Awards: Commander of the Legion of Honour

Commandant of New Caledonia
- In office 1 January 1854 – 31 October 1854
- Preceded by: Auguste Febvrier Despointes
- Succeeded by: Joseph Fidèle Eugène du Bouzet

Governor of French Guiana
- In office 15 May 1859 – 1 May 1864
- Preceded by: Auguste Laurent François Baudin
- Succeeded by: Antoine Favre (acting); Agathon Hennique

Louis-François-Marie Tardy de Montravel (28 September 1811 – 4 October 1864) was a French navigator explorer and administrator.

== Biography ==
Born in Vincennes, he was the son of an artillery colonel, Marie-Alexandre-Auguste Tardy de Montravel. He was admitted to the Naval Academy as a 2nd class student in 1827 and became a 1st class student in 1829. Promoted to Lieutenant on January 1, 1833, he volunteered for the Antarctic expedition led by Admiral Dumont d'Urville. His work in astronomy, geography and hydrography was one of the major sources for the writing of the atlas of this expedition. It also contributed significantly to the entomological collection which is constituted at the National Museum of Natural History. The quality of his workduring this trip was rewarded with the rank of lieutenant in 1839 and the Legion of Honour in 1842.

== Brazil ==
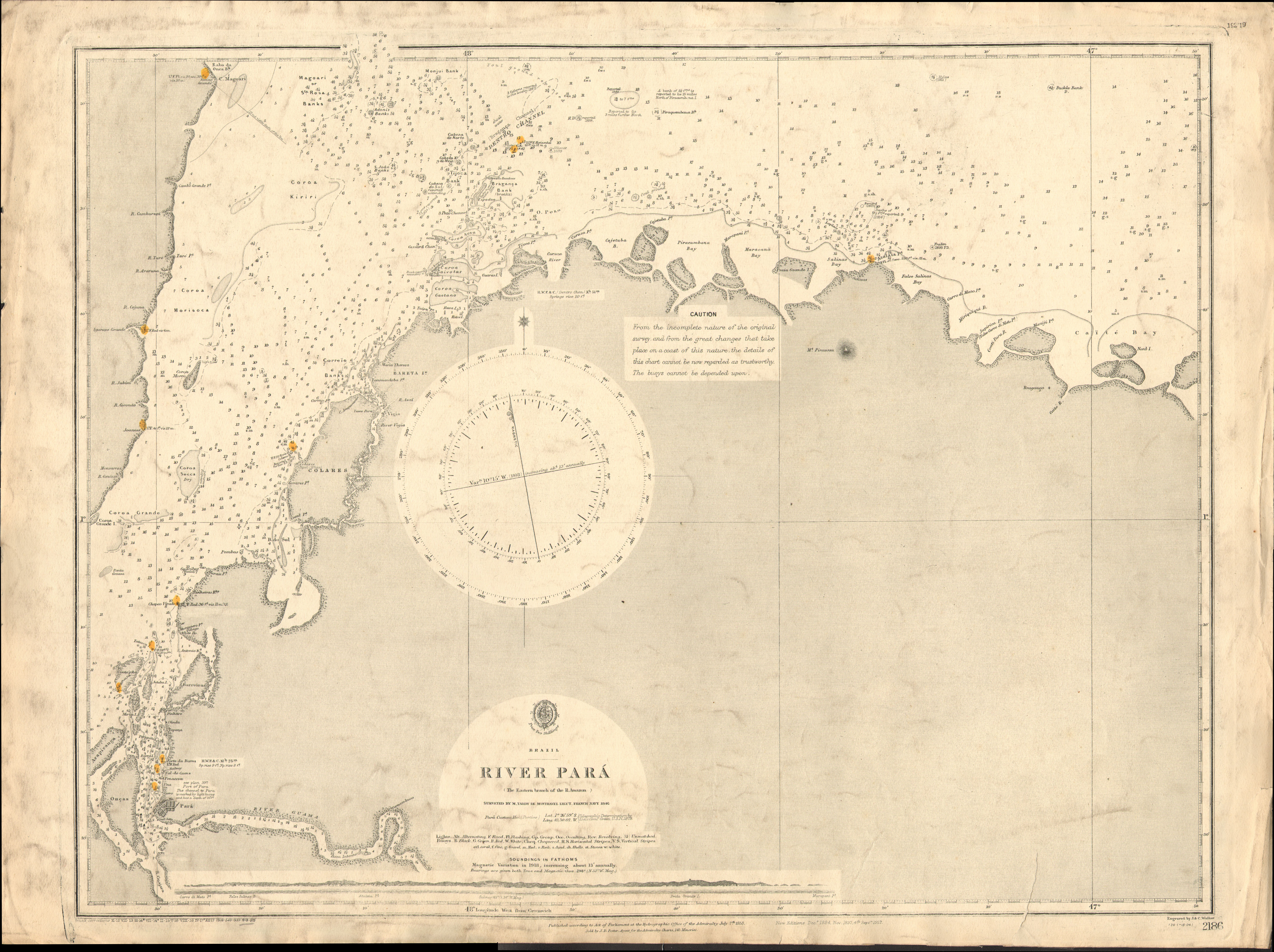
Nautical chart of the River Pará, Brazil, surveyed by Tardy de Montravel in 1846

On returning to Europe, Tardy de Montravel took command of the brig Boulonnais. Assigned to the Brazil station, this vessel was responsible for carrying out the hydrographic survey of the northern coast of Brazil, that of Guyana, and the mouth and course of the Amazon, which it ascended for 1000 km. This cartography work, carried out from 1842 to 1845, resulted in the development of an atlas of fourteen maps and the writing of two nautical documents. The publication of this hydrographic material earned its author the rank of lieutenant commander in 1846. These documents were to constitute a major element of documentation during the negotiations to delimit the border between French Guiana and Brazil concluded in 1856. In 1847, Captain de Montravel was appointed commander of the corvette L'Astrolabe, which joined the naval station on the coast of Argentina during the Platine War . He was responsible for bringing back to mainland France the treaty concluded with this country on August 31, 1850.

A hill and a beach, in French Guiana near Cayenne, are named Montravel.

== New Caledonia ==
Tardy de Montravel was promoted to captain on February 2, 1852, and embarked on the corvette La Constantine travelling to New Caledonia, which Rear-Admiral Febvrier-Despointes had just taken possession of. Montravel carried out a survey of the territory's coasts and managed the new colony. He decided to transfer the French establishment of Balade to the Nouméa peninsula.

He founded the city of Port-de-France there, renamed Nouméa in 1866, and built Fort Constantine to protect it. The reports he sent on the resources of the region were published by the government in Le Moniteur Universel.

A district of Nouméa is also called Montravel.

== Far East and Guyana ==
During the Crimean War, La Constantine sailed at the head of a naval division in the China and Japan seas, in the Sea of Okhotsk and at the mouth of the Amur River. Created an officer of the Legion of Honor in 1855, Tardy de Montravel returned to France the following year. He published the scientific results of his navigations on La Constantine in 1857. His observations on the Sea of Okhotsk, which was previously known only through reports from whalers, were taken up as a reference source by the Bureau des Longitudes. Captain de Montravel was a deputy member on the Admiralty Council until his appointment as 41st governor of French Guiana on 16 February 1859. In this role, he worked to improve the health of the Penal Colony of French Guiana and to promote the economic potential of agriculture and forestry which was carried on by convict labour.

Promoted to Commander of the Legion of Honor in 1860, he was elevated to the rank of rear admiral on February 27, 1864. He became Commander of the Orders of the Court and the Sword of Portugal, the Iron Crown, the Dutch Lion, and Our Lady of Guadalupe of Mexico.

Affected by the tropical climate, he died in Elbeuf on October 5, 1864 during convalescent leave in mainland France.

== Sources ==
- Dossier de Légion d'honneur de l'amiral Tardy de Montravel.
- Charles Duplessy : « le contre-amiral Tardy de Montravel, gouverneur de la Guyane française », Revue maritime et coloniale, Volume 13, 1865, Nécrologie pp.334-341.
- « Nécrologie géographique », L'année géographique, revue annuelle des voyages de terre et de mer, Third year, 1865, pp. 498–500.
- Olivier Chapuis : À la mer comme au ciel : Beautemps-Beaupré & la naissance de l'hydrographie, 1999, p. 776.

== See also ==
- Nouméa
- New Caledonia
