= Crique et Pripri Yiyi =

Protected area in French Guiana

- IUCN category IV (habitat/species management area)
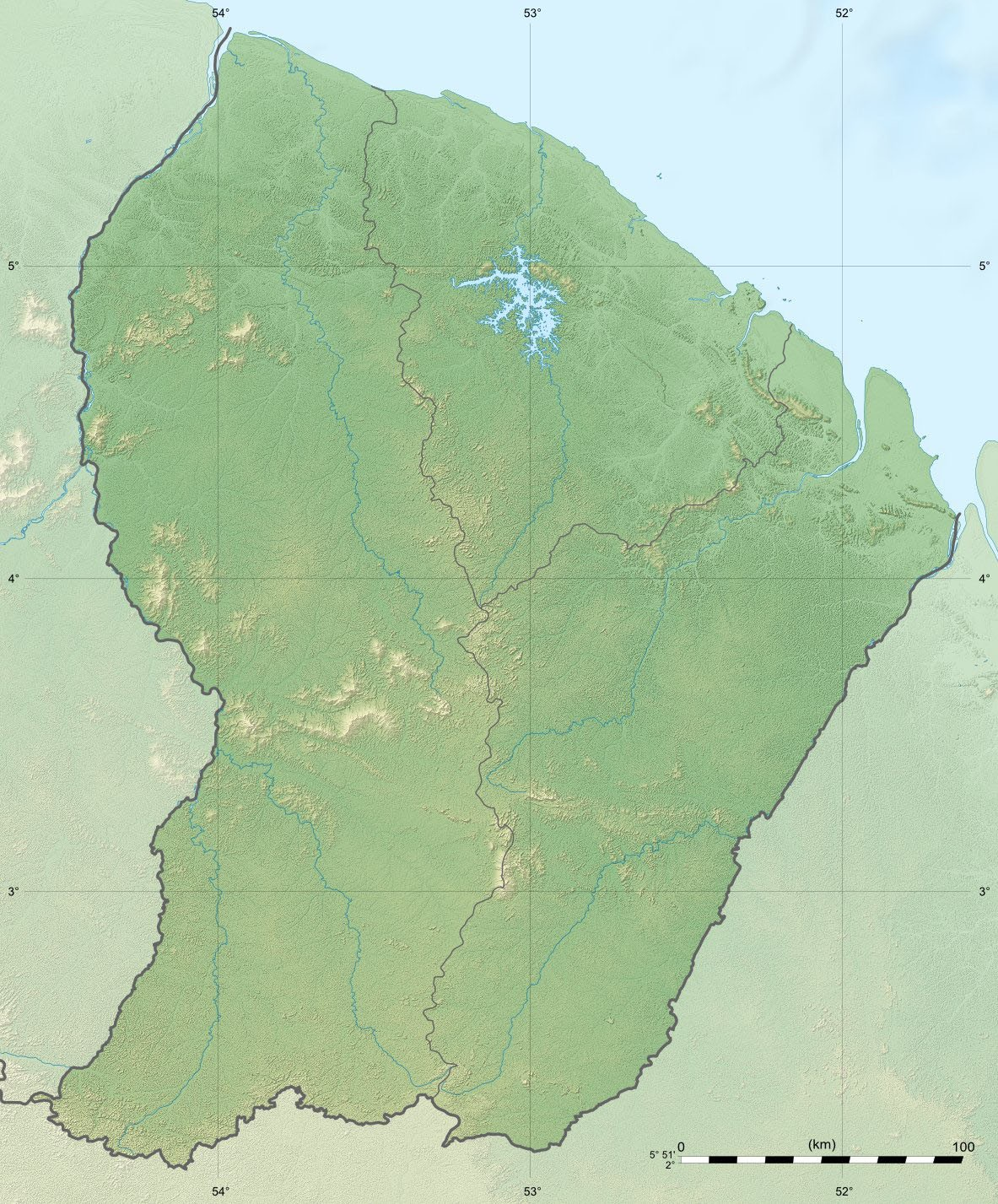
- Location within French Guiana
- Location: French Guiana, France
- Nearest city: Sinnamary
- Coordinates: 5.5077°N 53.2194°W
- Area: 284.44 km^{2} (109.82 sq mi)
- Established: 6 November 1995
- Governing body: Conservatoire du littoral

Ramsar Wetland
- Official name: Estuaire du fleuve Sinnamary
- Designated: 15 September 2008
- Reference no.: 1828

Crique et Pripri Yiyi is a protected area in French Guiana, France. The protected area is a wetland, and as of 2008, also a Ramsar site under the name of Estuaire du fleuve Sinnamary. It consists of mudflats, mangroves, freshwater swamps and seasonally flooded savannahs. Crique et Pripri Yiyi is located on the Atlantic Ocean coast in the communes of Iracoubo and Sinnamary. The protected area is delimited by the Iracoubo and Sinnamary Rivers.

== Name ==
The word Pripri means marsh in French Guianese Creole, and Yiyi was the nickname of Sylvain Sophie who lived in the village of Trou Poisson during the 19th century.

== Flora and fauna ==
Crique et Pripri Yiyi is home to West Indian manatees, bush dogs, Capybaras and common squirrel monkeys. The wetlands attract many migratory birds. The population of semipalmated sandpipers can reach up to one million birds. Other birds include masked ducks, Muscovy ducks, snail kites and scarlet ibises. The beach is a nesting and foraging area of the green sea turtle.

The area is home to several rare orchids: Habenaria pratensis, Habenaria trifida and Habenaria longicauda.

== Access ==
The site can be accessed from RN1 near the town of Sinnamary, and is called Maison de la Nature (House of Nature). A 2.5 kilometres (1.6 mi) footpath has been constructed through the marshes. There are two observatories within the protected area and an observation tower near the entrance. There is an ecological museum on the site which can be visited free of charge.
