= List of protected areas of French Guiana =

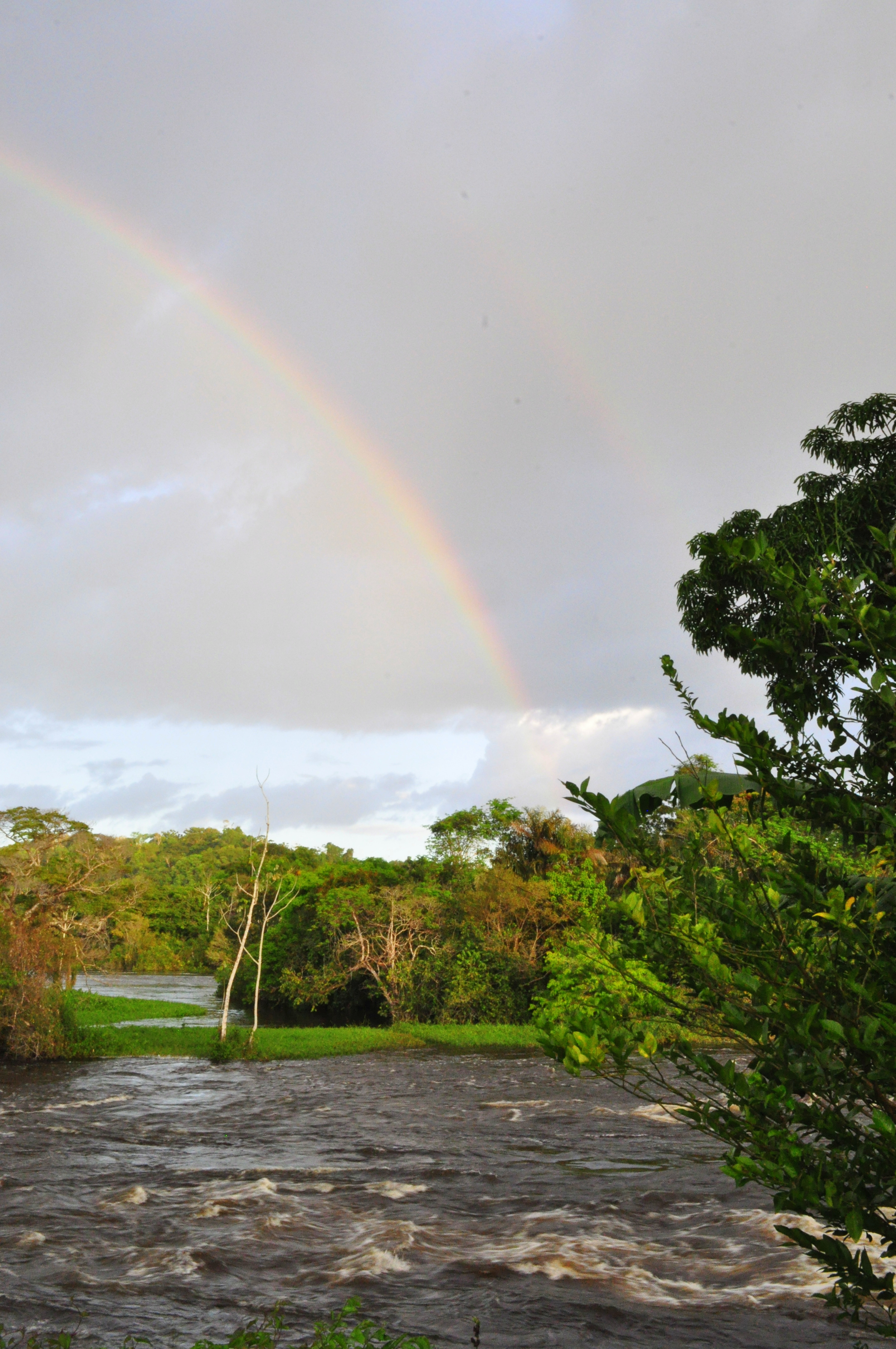
Maroni River in the Guiana Amazonian Park

There are several protected areas of French Guiana, an overseas region and department of France located in South America. The largest protected area is the Guiana Amazonian Park which covers 20,300 square kilometres (7,800 sq mi). As of 2020, 52% of the land territory is protected, and contains one national park, one regional nature reserve, six national nature reserves, two wilderness areas, and 20 sites protected by Conservatoire du littoral.

== Wilderness areas ==
- Lucifer Dékou-Dékou Biological Reserve. 2012. 644 km^{2}.
- Petite Montagnes Tortue Biological Reserve. 2016. 24 km^{2}.

== Nature parks ==
- Guiana Amazonian Park. 2007. 20,300 km^{2}.

== Nature reserves ==
- Amana Nature Reserve. 1998. 148 km^{2}.
- Île du Grand Connétable National Nature Reserve. 1992. 78.5 km^{2}.
- Kaw-Roura Marshland Nature Reserve. 1998. 947 km^{2}.
- Mont Grand Matoury Nature Reserve. 2006. 21 km^{2}.
- Nouragues Nature Reserve. 1995. 1,000 km^{2}.
- Trésor Regional Nature Reserve. 2010. 25 km^{2}.
- La Trinité National Nature Reserve. 1996. 760 km^{2}.

== Protected areas ==
- Crique et Pripri Yiyi. 1995. 284 km^{2}.
- Dupont Islets. 2013. 0.017 km^{2}.
- Habitation Vidal. 2015. 5 km^{2}.
- Îlet la Mère. 2000. 0.49 km^{2}.
- Montagne d'Argent. 1998. 7.13 km^{2}.
- Petit Cayenne. 2008. 23 km^{2}.
- Piste de l'Anse. 2008. 18 km^{2}.
- Pointe Liberte. 2015. 0.82 km^{2}.
- Prison of the Annamites. 2012. 2 km^{2}.
- Rivages de Cayenne. 1983. 0.51 km^{2}.
- Rive Droite du Mahury. 2013, 54 km^{2}.
- Salines de Montjoly. 1985. 0.63 km^{2}.
- Salvation Islands. 1979. 0.22 km^{2}.
- Savanes de Wayabo. 2015, 9.7 km^{2}.
- Savanes et Marais de Macouria. 2013. 45 km^{2}.
- Savane Des Peres. 2016. 6.2 km^{2}.
- Voltaire and Vieux Broussard Falls. 2000. 180 km^{2}.
