= Iracoubo =

Commune in French Guiana, France

- Commune
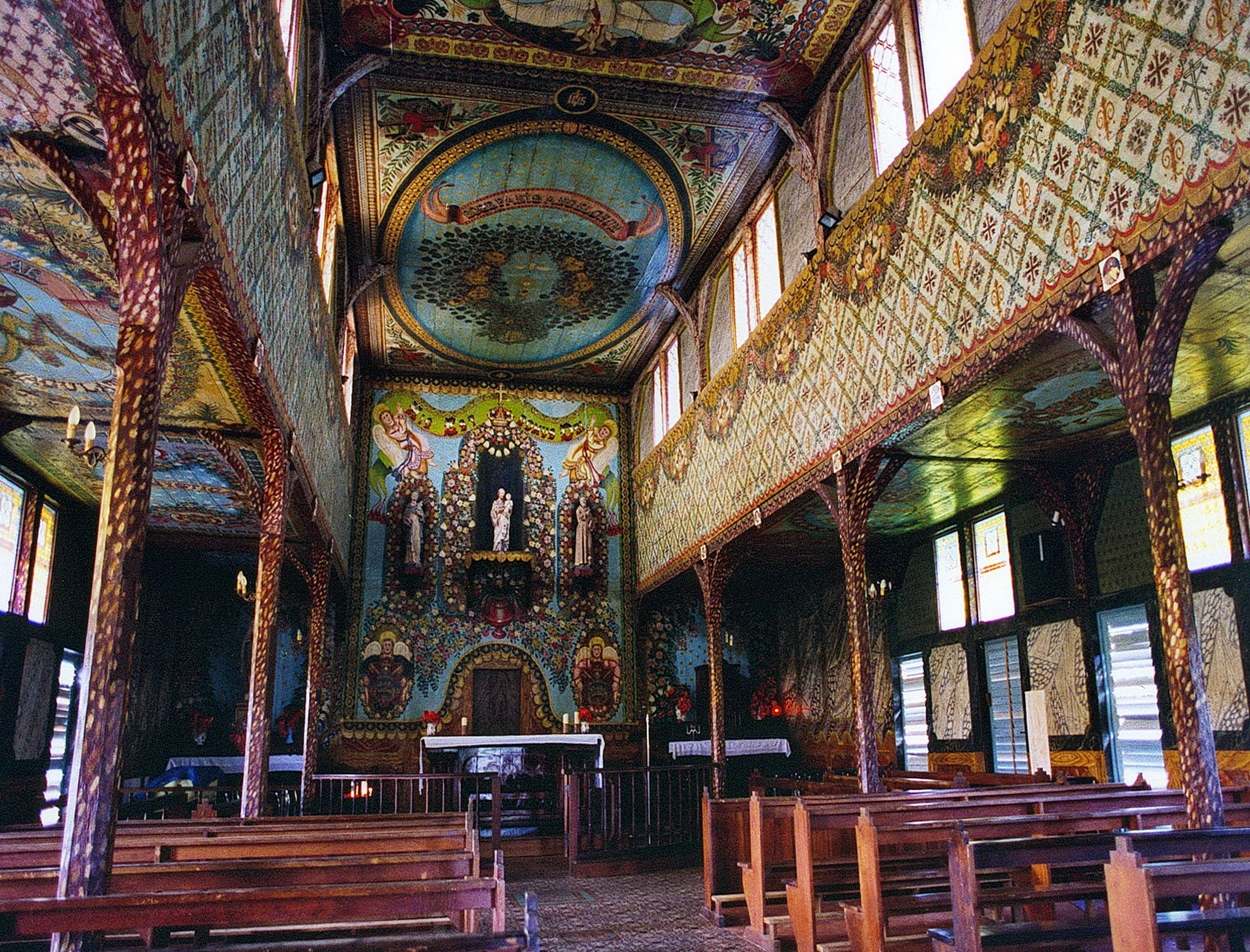
- Inside Saint Joseph's Church decorated by Pierre Huguet, a convict

- Coat of arms

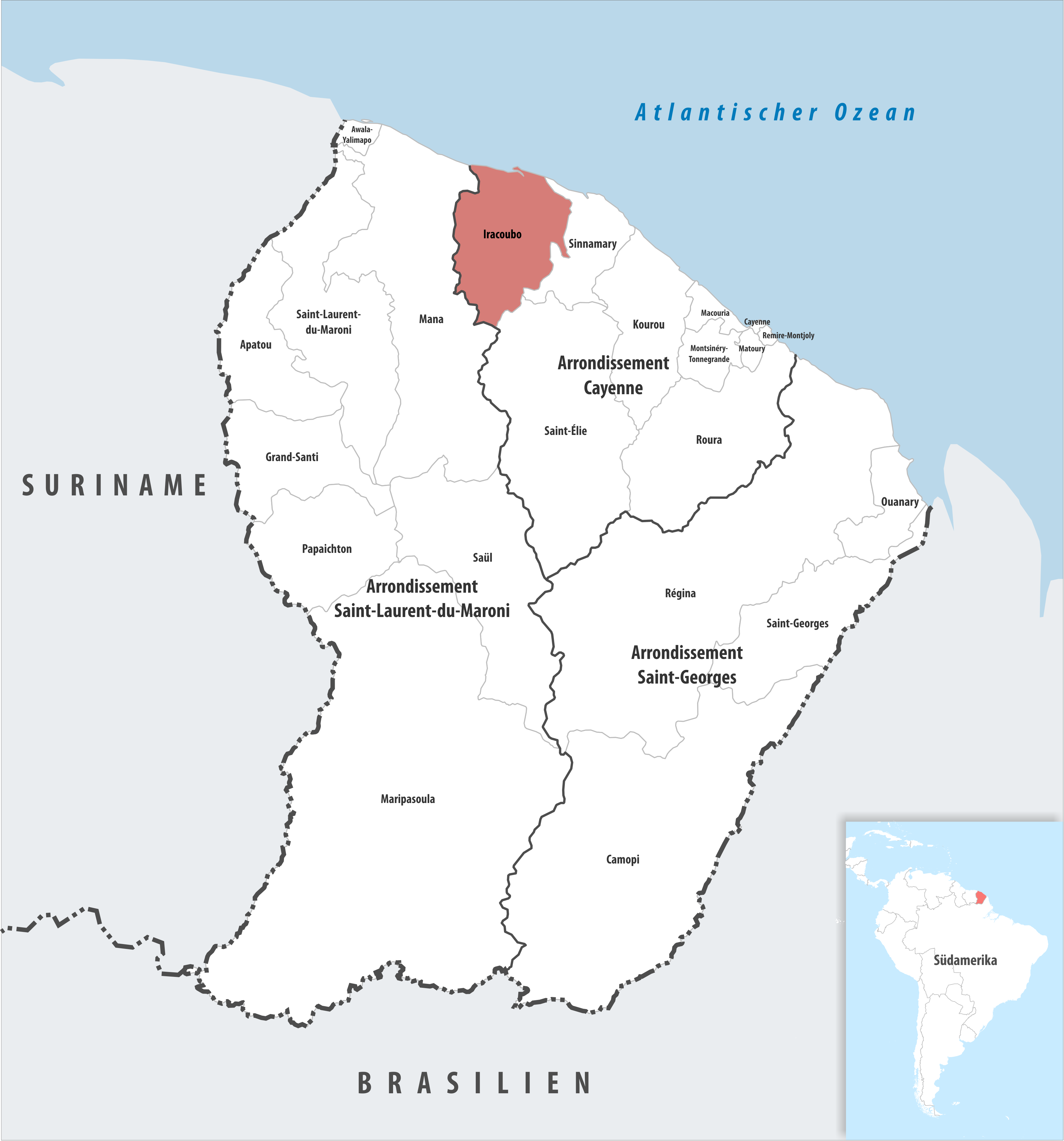
- Location of the commune (in red) within French Guiana
- Location of Iracoubo
- Coordinates: 5°28′46″N 53°12′14″W
- Country: France
- Overseas region and department: French Guiana
- Arrondissement: Cayenne
- Intercommunality: CC des Savanes

Government
  - Mayor (2020–2026): Céline Régis
- Area^{1}: 2,762 km^{2} (1,066 sq mi)
- Population (2023): 1,662
  - Density: 0.6017/km^{2} (1.558/sq mi)
- Time zone: UTC−03:00
- INSEE/Postal code: 97303 /97350
- ^{1} French Land Register data, which excludes lakes, ponds, glaciers > 1 km^{2} (0.386 sq mi or 247 acres) and river estuaries.

Iracoubo (French pronunciation: [iʁakubo]; French Guianese Creole: Yakoubo) is a commune on the coast of French Guiana, an overseas region and department of France, located in South America.

== Geography ==
The settlement of Iracoubo, seat of the commune, is located between the settlement of Sinnamary and the hamlet of Organabo.

The village of Bellevue is 5 km (3.1 mi) west of Iracoubo.

Trou Poisson, a near abandoned village is located to the south. The village has a cemetery of priests deported during the French Revolution.

== History ==
The commune was originally settled by Amerindians near Organabo. The first settlers arrived in 1626, but were driven back. In 1765, the Galibis who had left the area for Suriname because an epidemic had broken out, returned.

In the beginning of the 19th century, Iracoubo started as a cotton plantation owned by Colonel Jacquet. In 1859, the cotton shed is donated to the community to serve as church. During the late 19th century indigenous Kalina lived along the Rococoua river in Counama and Organabo. In 1886, Father Raffray arrived in the village, and started to build the Saint Joseph's Church which opened in 1893. The church is notable for its elaborate decorations on the walls and ceiling created by Pierre Huguet, a convict of the penal colony. Saint-Joseph was declared a monument in 1978.

In 1912, the introduction of bananas and rosewood strengthened the economy which remains based on agriculture, hunting and fishing. Iracoubo is located on the Route nationale 1 connecting Saint-Laurent-du-Maroni to Cayenne.

== Organabo ==
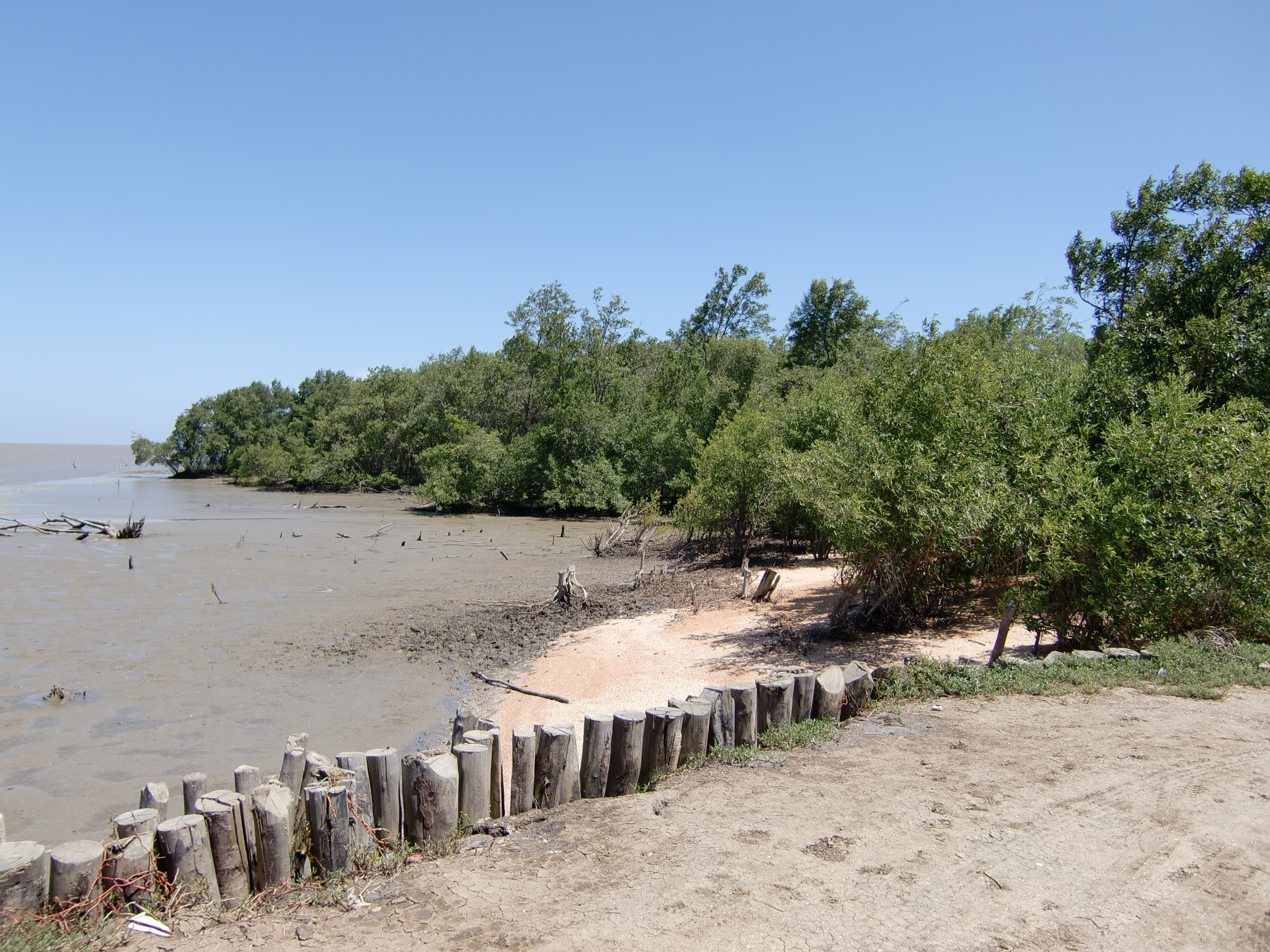
Ocean beach near Organabo

Organabo is a Galibi village located in the commune. As of 2020, the population is about 200 people, and consisted mainly of elderly people, because the youth had moved on to the city. The village used to be on the estuary of the Iracaoubo River facing the Atlantic Ocean, but is now several kilometres land inwards. The population primarily lives from fishing, and agriculture. In December 2018, the villagers were given communal land. The village is self sufficient, and therefore self isolated during the COVID-19 pandemic of 2020.

== Nature ==
Crique et Pripri Yiyi is a 284 square kilometres (110 sq mi) protected area and wetland located in the commune.

== River ==
Iracoubo is also a river in French Guiana. Its mouth is located at 5.545055°N 53.292926°W. The river is 160 kilometres long and flows into Atlantic Ocean.

== See also ==
- Communes of French Guiana
