= Bellevue, French Guiana =

Bellevue
- Village
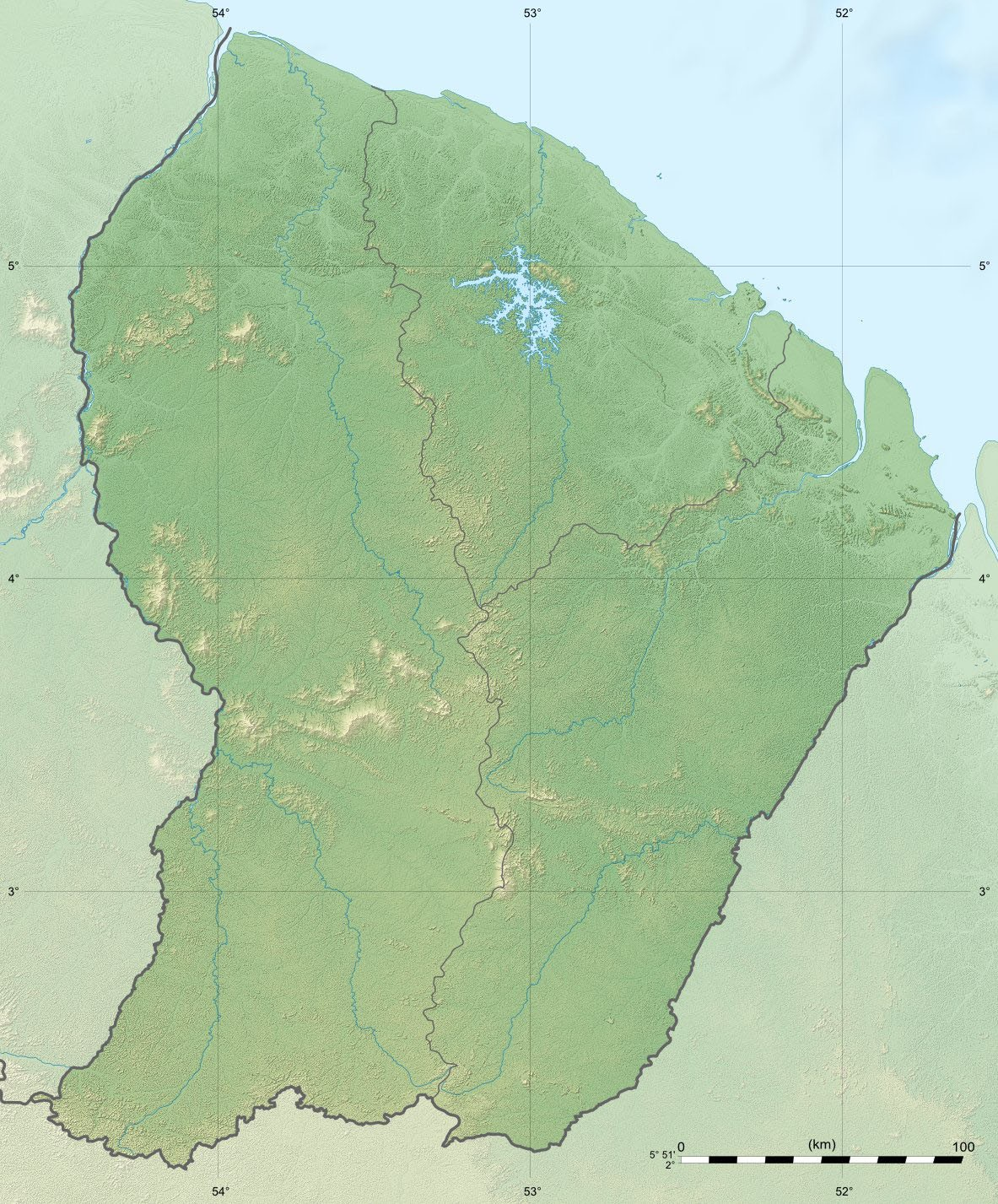
- Location in French Guiana
- Coordinates: 5°28′29″N 53°15′35″W
- Country: France
- Overseas region: French Guiana
- Arrondissement: Cayenne
- Commune: Iracoubo

Population (2017)
  - Total: 536
- Time zone: UTC-03:00 (GFT)

Bellevue (French pronunciation: [bɛlvy]) is an Amerindian Kalina village in the commune of Iracoubo, French Guiana.

== Overview ==
Bellevue is an Amerindian village on Route nationale 1, approximately eight kilometres away from Iracoubo. Its inhabitants were originally residing in Grosse Roche, situated by the Atlantic Ocean. However, in the 1950s, they were resettled in Bellevue. While the village hosts a couple of shops, the closest accommodations can be found in Iracoubo. The village has a school.

The Kali'nas (also known as Galibis), residing in Bellevue, continue to uphold some of their traditional practices (fishing, danses).

In 1997, Cécile Kouyouri made history by becoming first female Amerindian chief in French Guiana. Moreover, in 2018, the village was allocated 1,000 hectares of communal land.
