= Îlet la Mère =

- Island
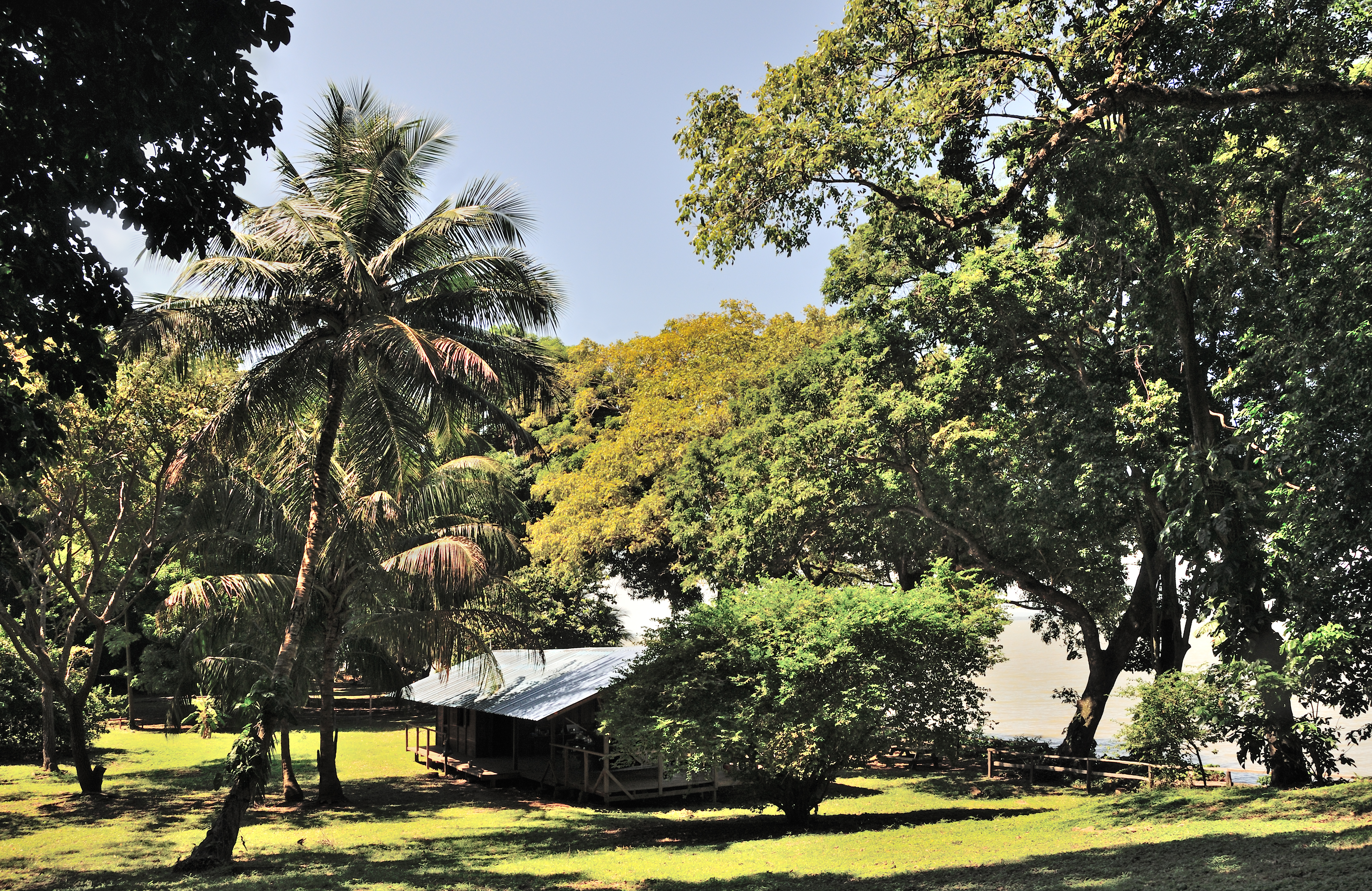
- The wharf at Îlet la Mère

- Location in French Guiana
- Coordinates: 4.89200°N 52.18441°W
- Country: France
- Overseas region: French Guiana
- Arrondissement: Cayenne
- Commune: Cayenne

Area
  - Total: 0.49 km^{2} (0.19 sq mi)

Population (1934)
  - Total: 0

Îlet la Mère is the biggest island of the Rémire islands in the Atlantic Ocean. It is part of the commune of Cayenne, French Guiana. The island is located 11 kilometres off the coast. Îlet la Mère was the location of a penal colony from 1852 until 1875. Between 1981 and 2001, it was home to a monkey farm operated by the Pasteur Institute. Since 28 December 2000, the island is a protected area and managed by Conservatoire du littoral.

== History ==
Îlet la Mère was originally inhabited by Amerindians. In 1643, Jesuits settled on the island. In 1776, they left the island, and it became a leprosy colony. A hospital was built on the island to treat the lepers. In 1786, the site was abandoned.

In 1852, Îlet la Mère became a penal colony for political prisoners, and is one of the oldest prisons of the bagne. 70 buildings were constructed to house the prisoners, and up to 600 prisoners were put to work on the island. In 1875, yellow fever ravaged the island, and the penal colony was closed. The ruins are still visible.

In 1923, Îlet la Mère was rented from the French Government by the wife of Duez, a former prisoner. She built a farm with her husband. The island was used for animal husbandry and producing fruit. A workforce of about 20 prisoners was employed to work the land. The farm closed in 1933.

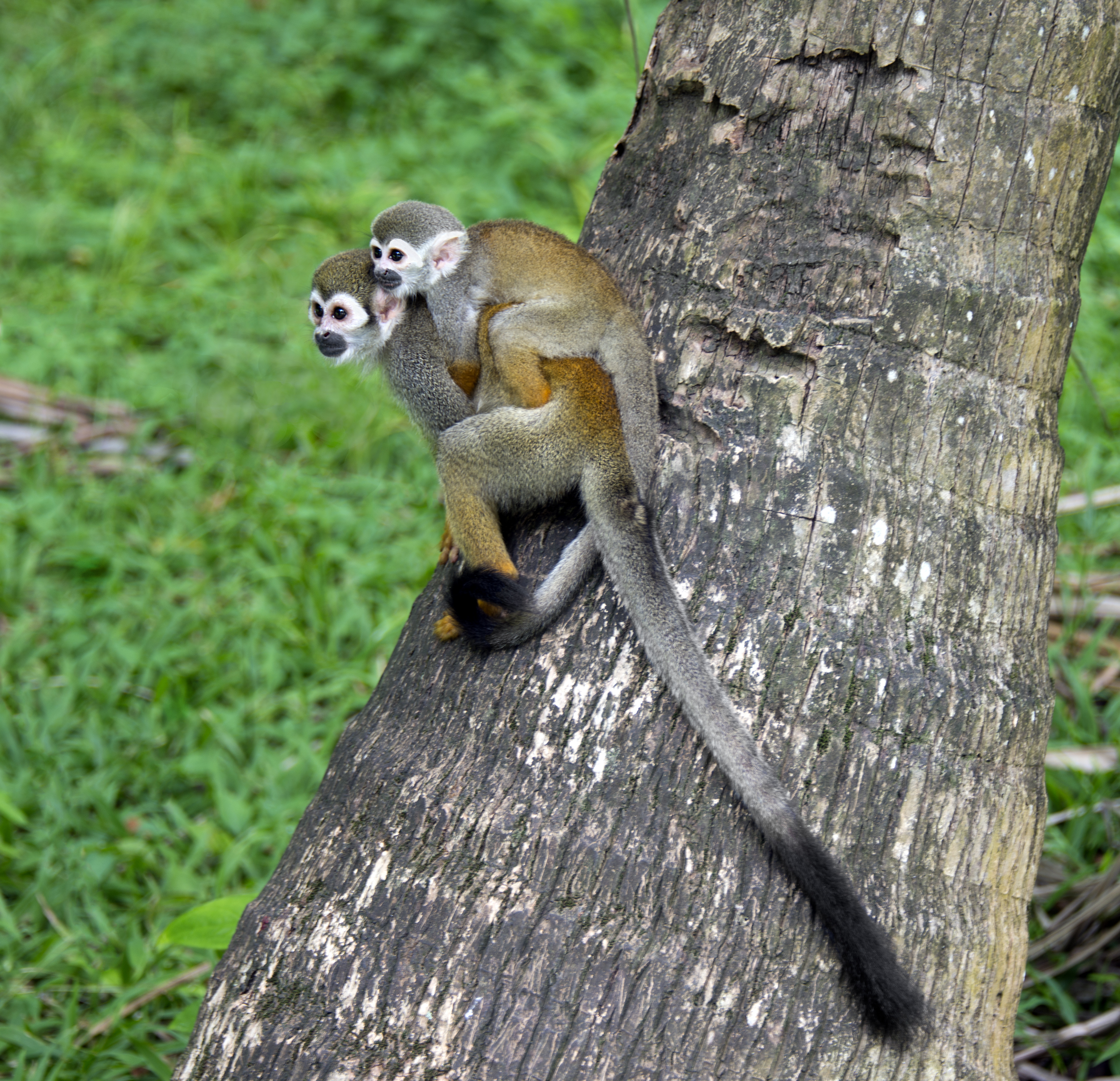
Squirrel monkeys on Îlet la Mère

In 1981, the Pasteur Institute began using the island as a research facility. They set out to build a monkey farm with squirrel monkeys. The monkeys were used to create an antiserum to treat malaria.

On 28 December 2000, Îlet la Mère became a protected area managed by Conservatoire du littoral. The island was opened to the public in 2007, and a 3.5 kilometre path has been constructed to see the sites on the island. The monkeys are still present, and are not shy of human visitors. The island can be reached from Wayki village, Remire-Montjoly. The boat trip will take about one hour.
