= Saint Joseph's Church, Iracoubo =

Saint Joseph's Church
- Église Saint-Joseph d'Iracoubo
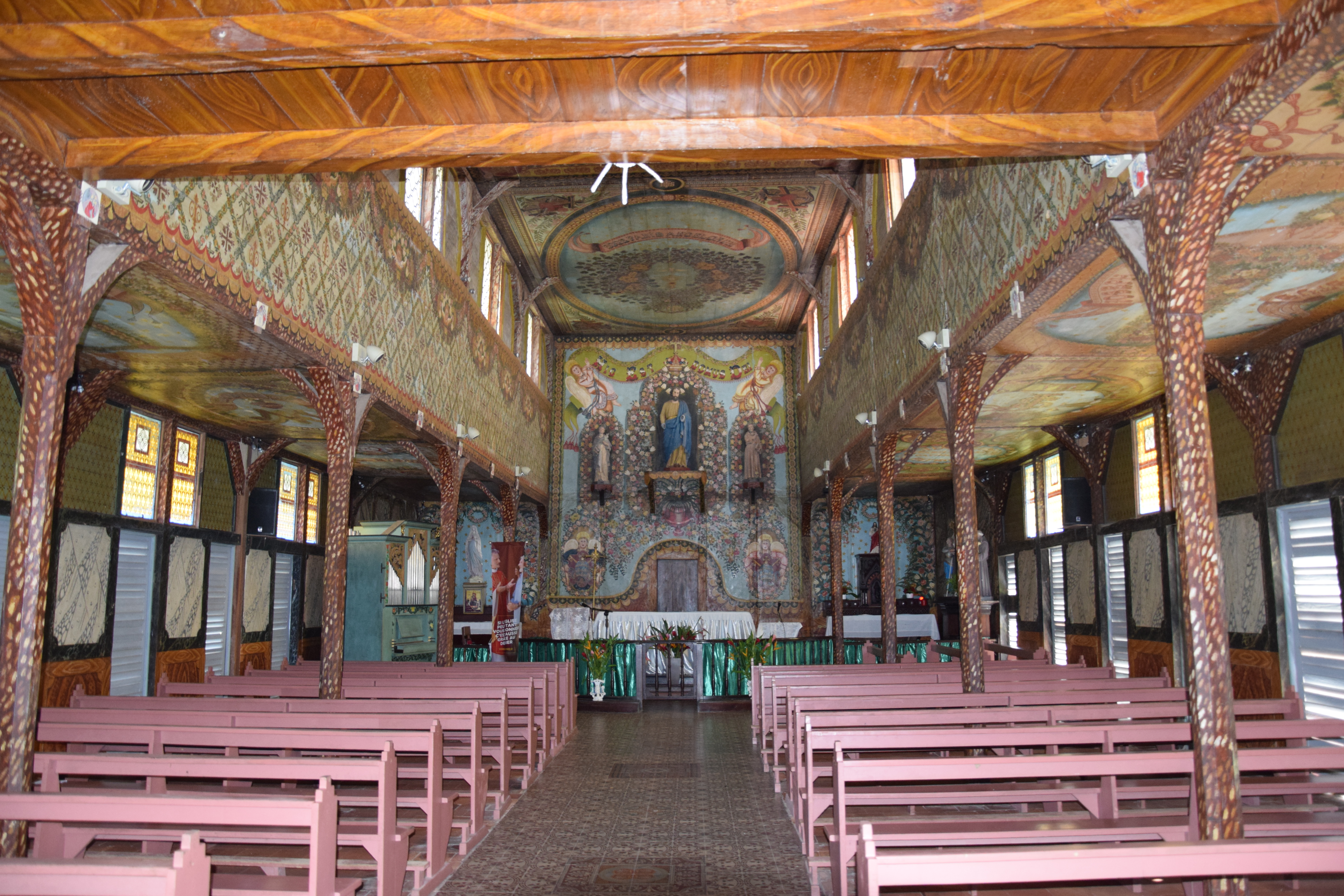
- Inside Saint Joseph's Church
- Saint Joseph's Church
- 5.47934°N 53.20660°W
- Location: Iracoubo, French Guiana
- Country: France
- Denomination: Roman Catholic Church

History
- Consecrated: 6 January 1893

Architecture
- Years built: 1887-1893

Saint Joseph's Church (French: Église Saint-Joseph d'Iracoubo) is a Roman Catholic church located in Iracoubo, French Guiana, France. The church is known for its elaborate decorations on the walls and ceiling created by Pierre Huguet, a convict of the penal colony. The church became a historic monument in 1978.

== History ==
Father Prosper Raffray arrived in Iracoubo on 6 March 1866. At the time, the village was home to about 500 to 600 people, and the church was located in a shed. Raffray set out to create a model village, and built a school, a clergy house and a real church. Construction of the Saint Joseph's Church started in 1887, and the church was consecrated on 6 January 1893.

Pierre Huguet, a resident of Clermont-Ferrand, was sentenced to 20 years for burglary in 1889, and shipped to the penal colony of French Guiana. In 1893, he arrived at Camp Iracoubo, and started to paint and decorate the inside of the church.

During his time at Iracoubo, Huguet decorated nearly 600 m^{2} of the walls and the ceiling with frescos in his unique style. Huguet also tried to escape six times, and was finally released in 1909. Until 1977, it was only known that an unknown convict had decorated the church. On 8 July 1978, the church was declared a monument. The church is sometimes nicknamed the "Sistine Chapel of the Amazon", and classified as naïve art.

The church started to deteriorate in the early 21st century mainly caused by the high humidity which resulted in gaps and cracks in the foundation and plaster. In 2020, Saint Joseph's Church was selected as one of five candidates for Overseas France of the Heritage Lotto, a lottery dedicated to relatively unknown architecture. As of 2021, the church will be restored.

== Gallery ==
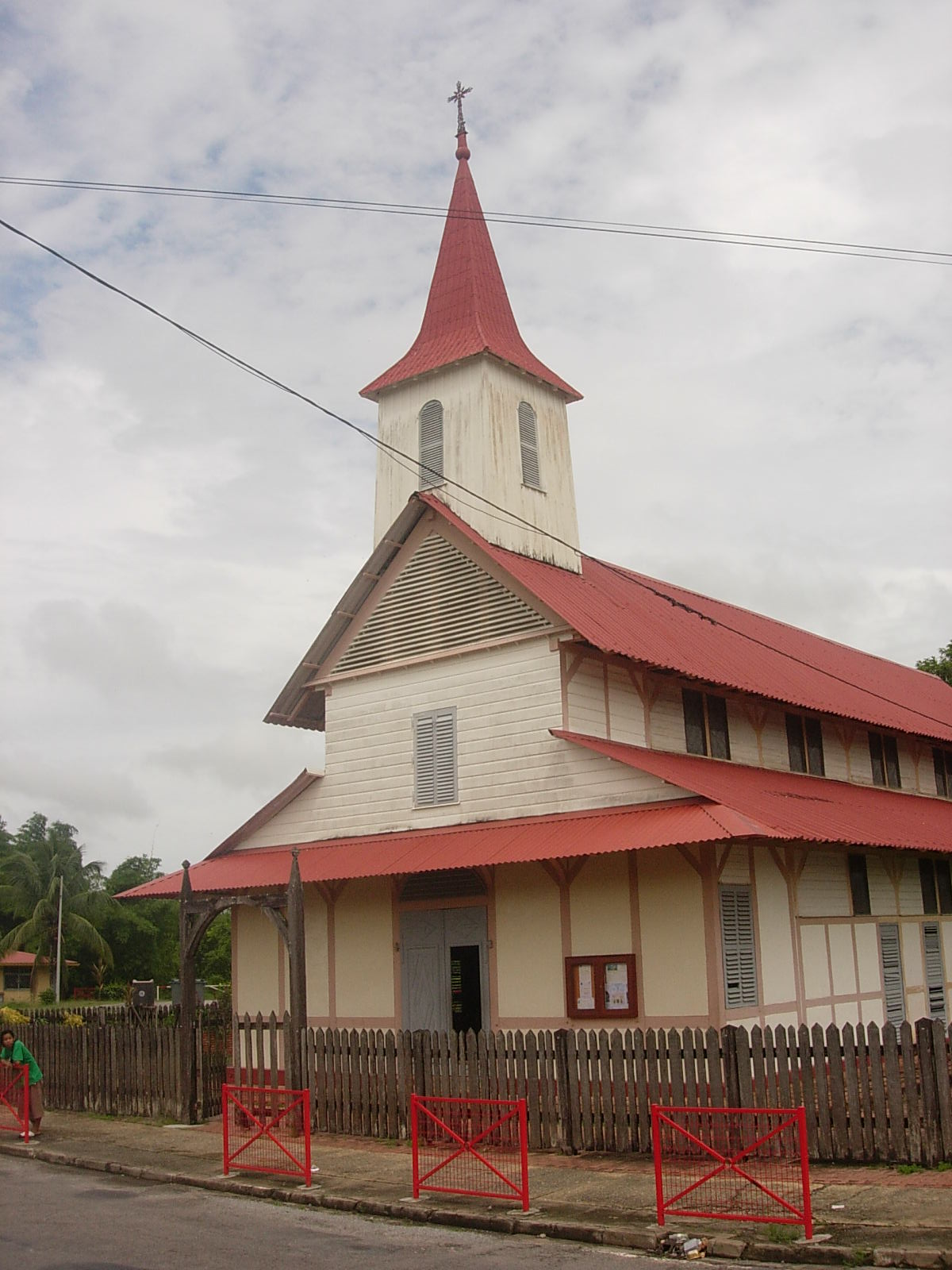
Church from the outside

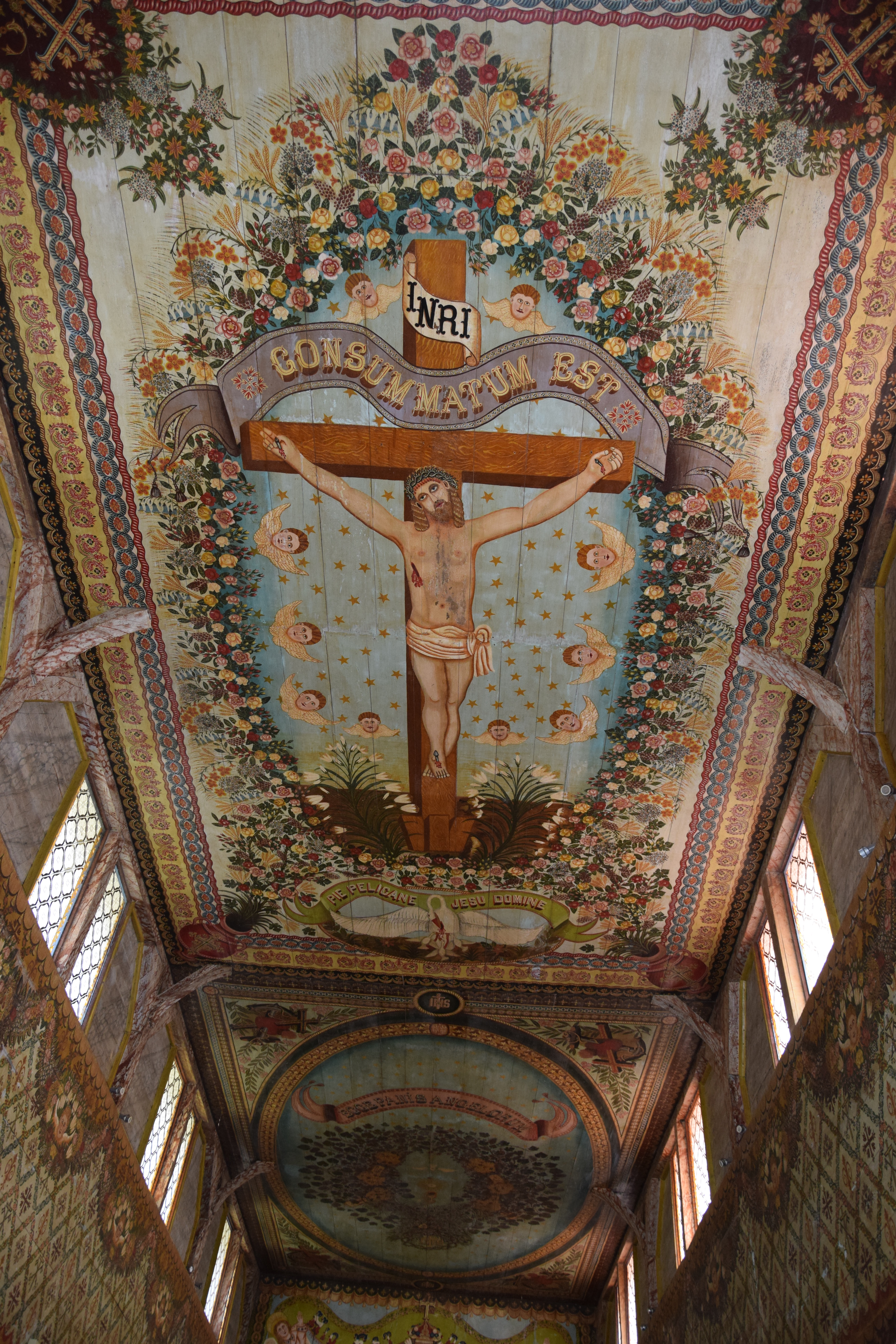
Ceiling

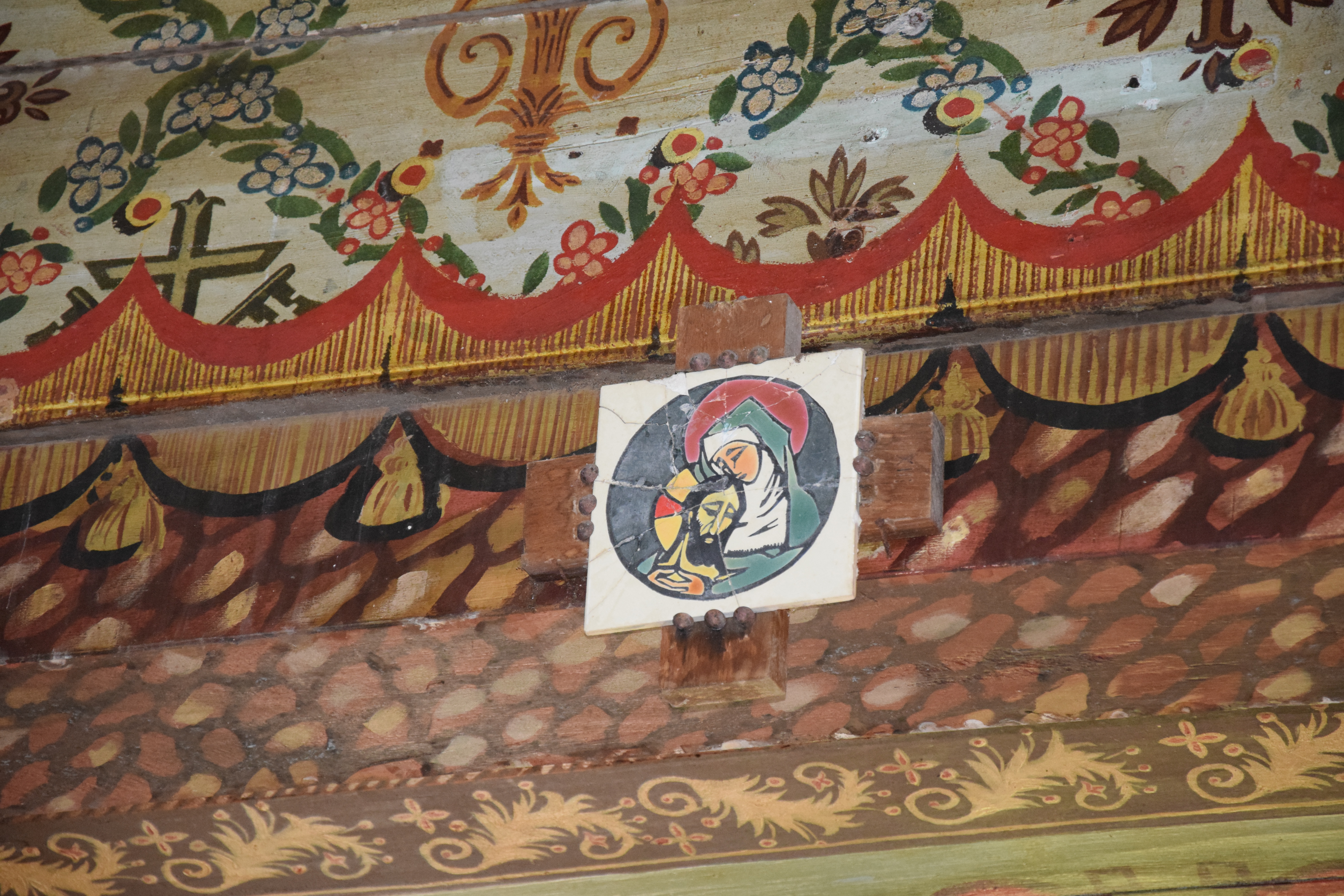
Details on the wall

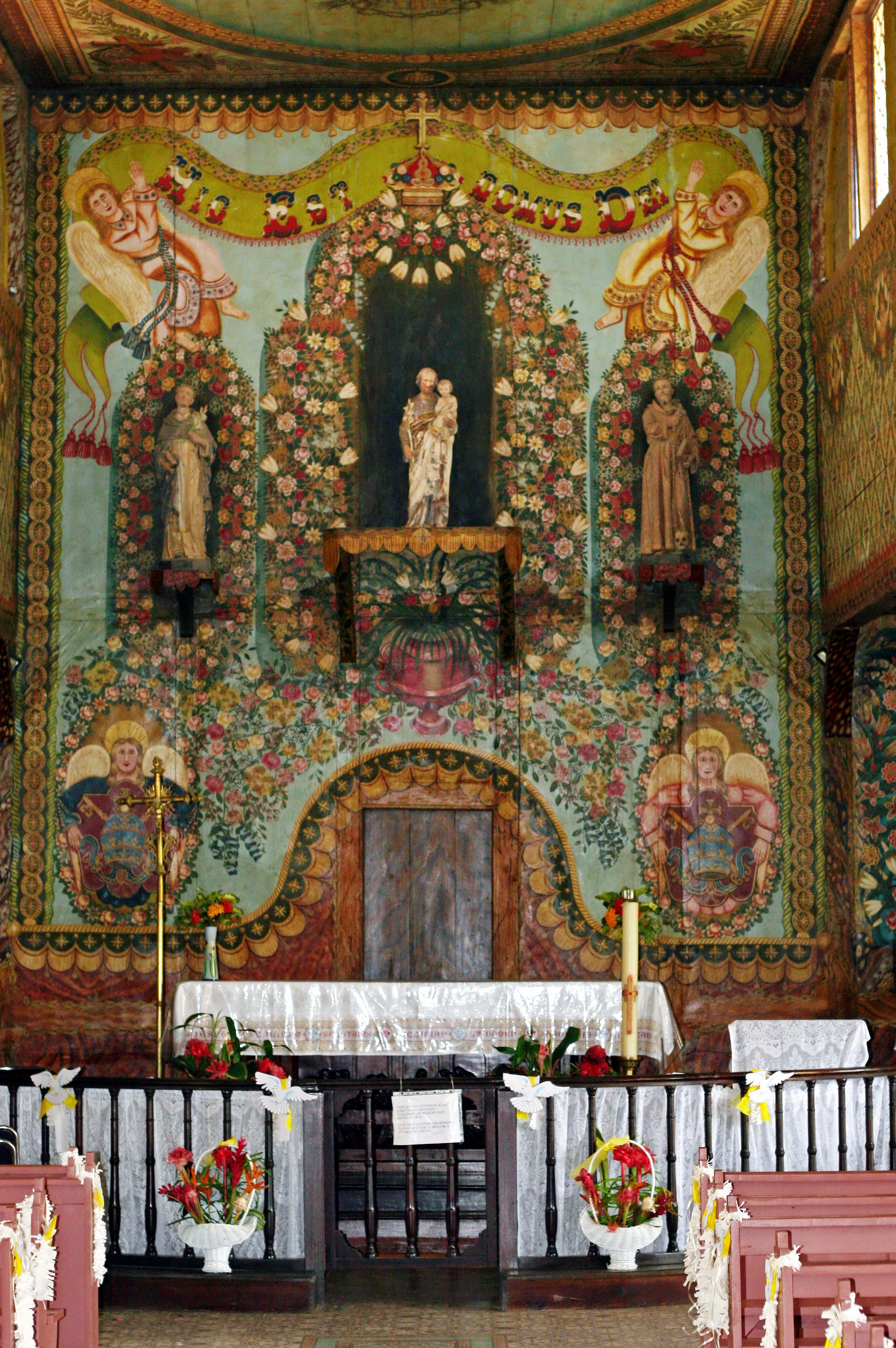
Altar

== See also ==
- Roman Catholicism in French Guiana
