= Trou Poisson =

- Village
- Location in French Guiana
- Coordinates: 5.404293°N 53.133186°W
- Country: France
- Overseas region: French Guiana
- Arrondissement: Cayenne
- Commune: Iracoubo

Population (2012)
  - Total: 5−6

Trou Poisson is a village in the commune of Iracoubo in French Guiana. The village is near abandoned, and has a cemetery for priests deported during the French Revolution.

== Overview ==
Trou Poisson was founded in the 1850s by Théodore Golitin. Around 1860, the population of the village was 112 people.

The population declined dramatically in the 20th century. At the 2007 election it was the smallest polling office in France. In 2012, there were 43 registered voters, however most voters arrived from Iracoubo or Cayenne. The polling office worker estimated the actual population at 5 or 6 people. The village used to have a school, but it has been abandoned, and is near collapse.

== Sights ==
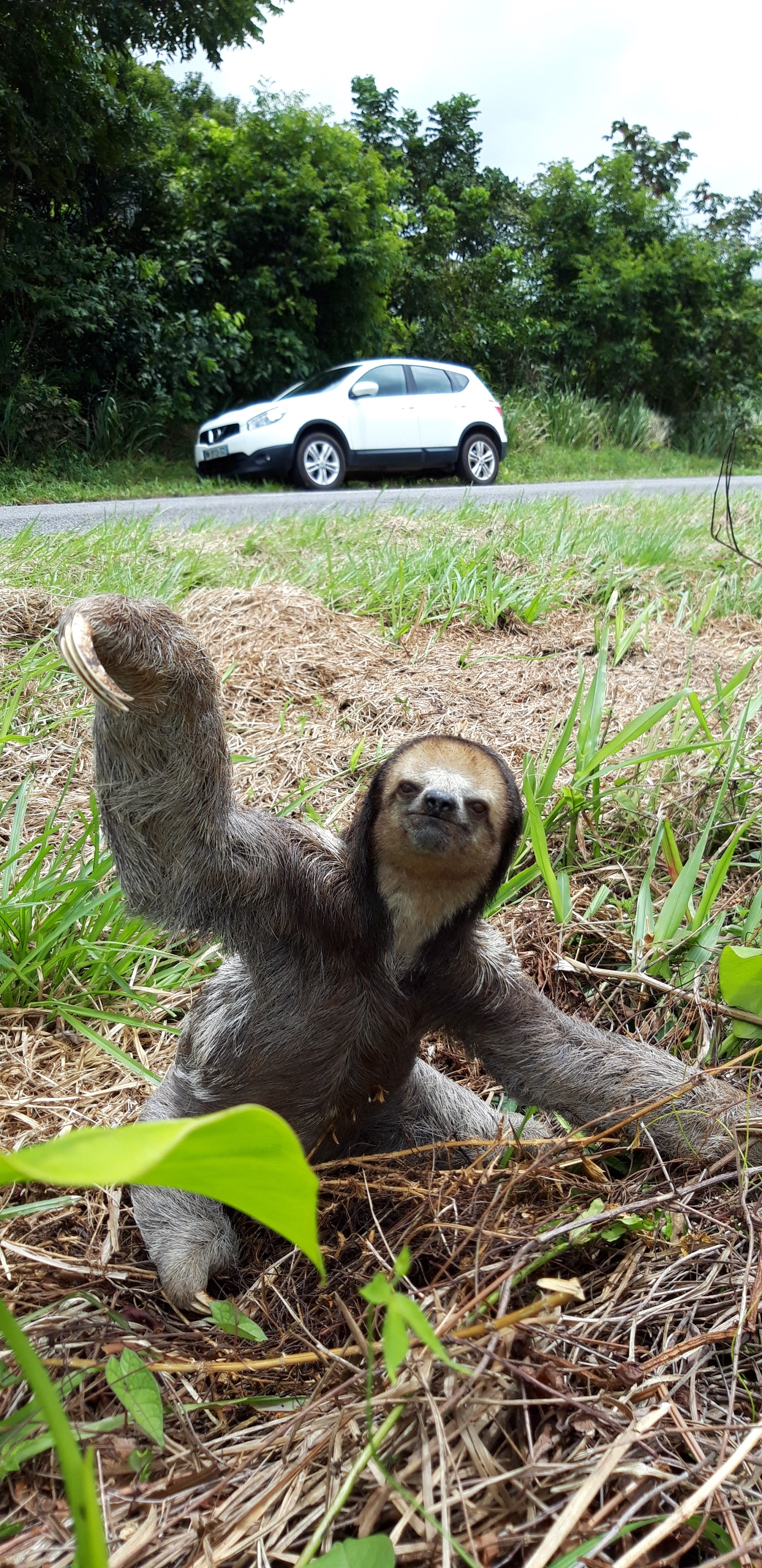
A sloth on the road to Trou Poisson

Savane Des Peres, is located near Trou Poisson. It is a cemetery for priests who had been deported to French Guiana during the French Revolution. The site has been protected since 2016, and is managed by Conservatoire du littoral.

The village is located in a large savannah area. In 2014, a zone of 2,403 hectares was designated as a ZNIEFF, an important ecological area. The Trou Poisson savannah is considered an important feeding and resting area for birds.
