= Malani (river) =

Malani River Marowijnekreek River Marouini / Marowini River
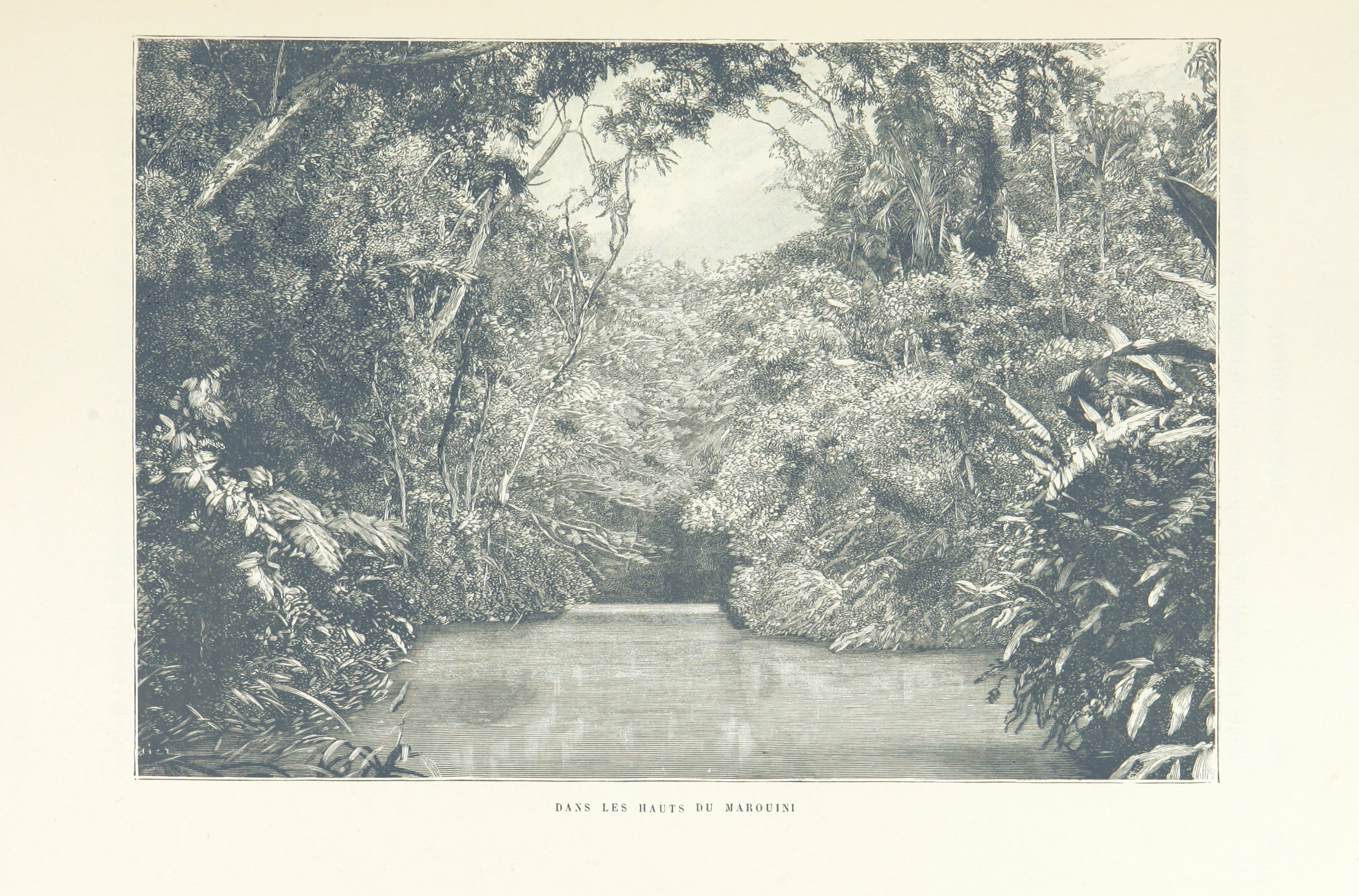
- Drawing of the Malani during the Henri Coudreau expedition (1893)

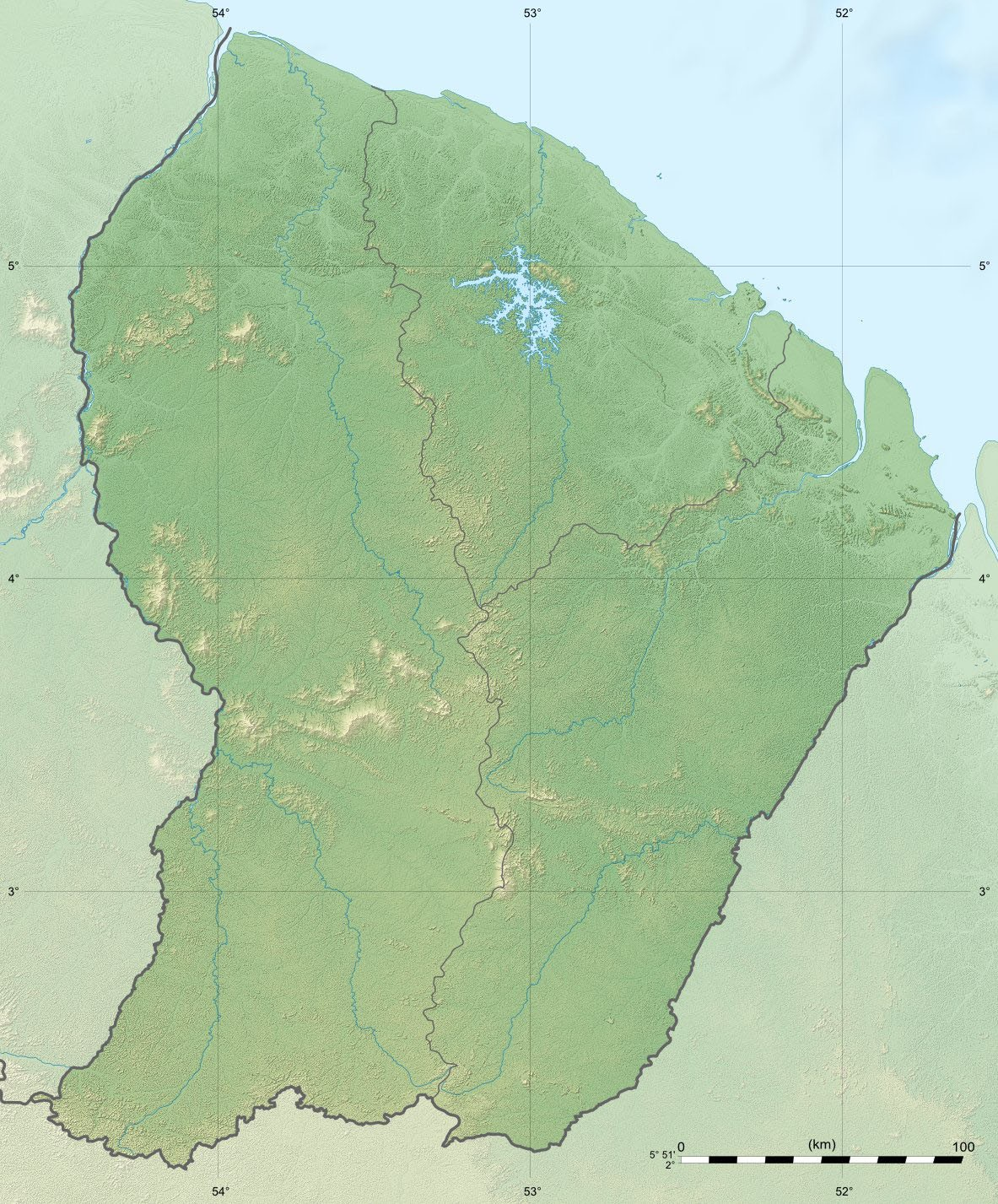
- Location of mouth

Location
- Country: France / Suriname
- Territory: French Guiana
- Municipality: Maripasoula / Tapanahony

Physical characteristics
- Source: Pic Coudreau, Tumuk Humak Mountains
  - coordinates: 2°15′28.4″N 54°20′44.9″W
- Mouth: Confluence with Litani
  - coordinates: 3°17′58.9″N 54°3′58″W
- Length: 245 km (152 mi)

Basin features
- Progression: Lawa → Maroni → Atlantic Ocean
- Tributaries
  - right: Wanapi

The Malani (Dutch: Marowijnekreek), also Marouini (Dutch: Marowini), is a river in the disputed area between French Guiana and Suriname. According to Suriname, it is the border river, however France considers the Litani the border. The river has its source at Pic Coudreau in the Tumuk Humak Mountains. It has its mouth at the confluence with the Litany at Antécume-Pata and continues its journey as the Lawa River. The Malani has a length of 245 kilometres (152 mi).

== Name ==
The river is known in Suriname and the Netherlands as the Marowijnekreek. It used to be called Marouini in France, however the Wayana name of Malani is becoming the accepted version. The names Marouini and Marowijnekreek were also used in the past for the Lawa River.

== Course ==
The Malani has its source at Pic Coudreau, a 711 metres (2,333 ft) high inselberg in the Tumuk Humak Mountains near the border with Brazil. The river first heads south and makes a 180 degree turn around Pic Coudreau and continues its journey northwards through the tropical rainforest. The largest tributary is the Wanapi which measures 92 kilometres (57 mi). After a meandering journey of 245 kilometres (152 mi), there is a confluence with the Litani, and both rivers continue as the Lawa River. The Lawa in turn flows into the Maroni which has its mouth at the Atlantic Ocean.

== Former settlements ==
In 1791, the Aluku Maroons were driven from Suriname and moved into French Guiana. The tribe continued their journey to the Malani. They were not completely safe there either, because Boni, the leader of the tribe, was killed on the river on 19 February 1793. The Aluku eventually returned to Gaan Day along the Lawa River, and had abandoned the Malani around 1839.

From the 1880s onwards, the indigenous Wayana moved from the Paru River in Brazil northwards along the Malani and Litani. Several villages were founded which were visited by Henri Coudreau in 1893. With the exception of Saint-Laurent which is located at the mouth, the river is nowadays uninhabited.

== See also ==
- Borders of Suriname § Eastern border
- List of rivers of French Guiana
- List of rivers of Suriname
