= Jules Crevaux =

Explorer (1847–1882)

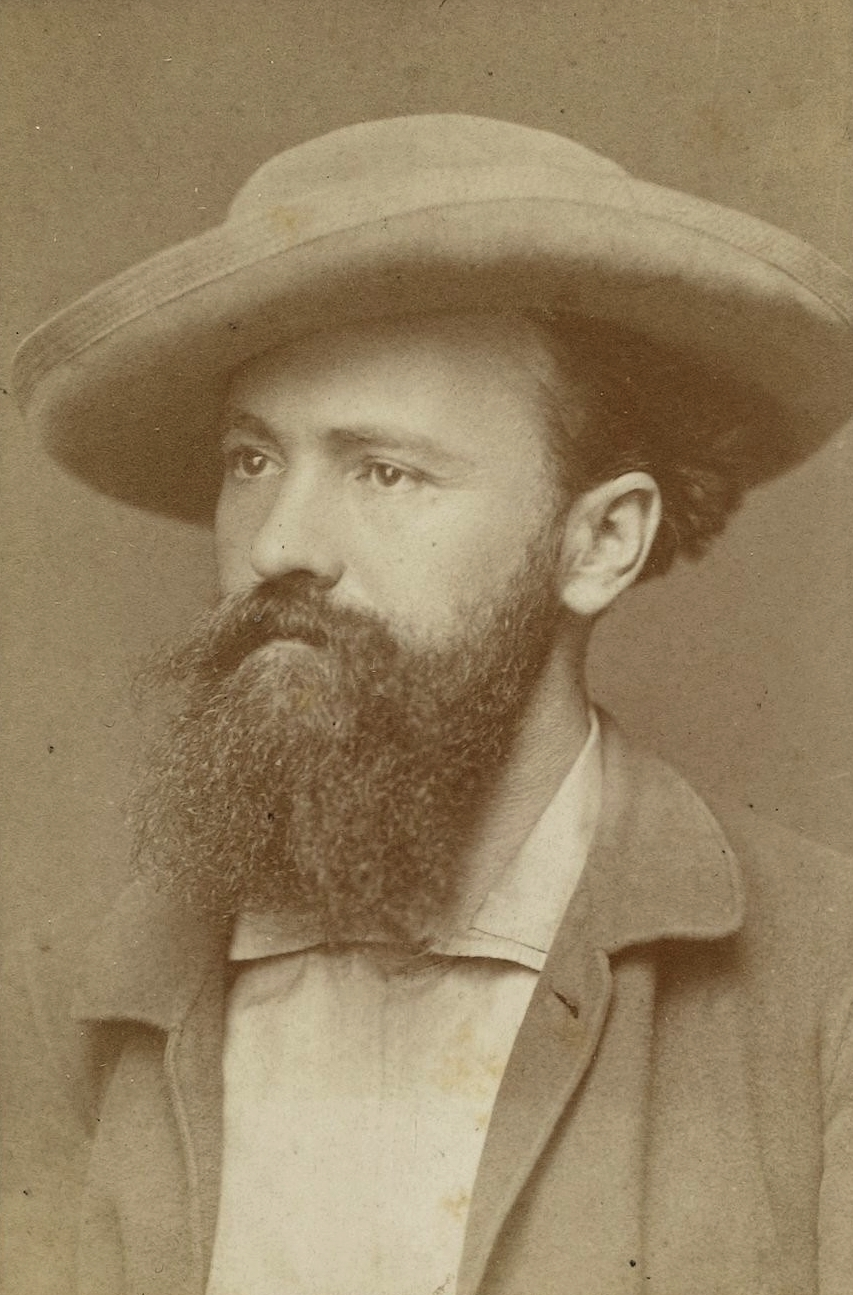
- Jules Crevaux, c. 1875
- Born: April 1, 1847; Lorquin, France
- Died: April 27, 1882 (aged 35); Bolivia
- Occupations: French doctor and explorer

Jules Crevaux (1847–1882) was a French medical doctor, soldier, and explorer. He is known for his multiple explorations into the interior of French Guiana and the Amazon.

== Biography ==
Jules Crevaux was born on April 1, 1847, in the north-eastern French town of Lorquin. He began to study medicine at the University of Strasbourg before being transferred to the French Navy's medical school at Brest. In 1868 he was assigned to the Cérès as a medical assistant and served in Senegal, the French West Indies and French Guiana. At the beginning of the Franco-Prussian War in 1870, he volunteered to serve as a marine. He was sent to the Loire Valley where he was wounded and captured by Prussian forces on December 17, 1870. He escaped soon after and was wounded again on January 24, 1871.

Following the war, he completed his medical studies and was granted his M.D.. He was appointed as chief physician on the La Motte-Piquet. He was sent to the colony of French Guiana in 1876.

The interior of French Guiana was virtually unknown and Crevaux decided to lead an exploration into its depths. On July 8, 1877, Crevaux traveled up the Maroni River where he encountered the Galibi and the Aluku. Apatou, an Aluku, was to become his guide. He left the Maroni to follow a tributary, the Itany River, along the way he visited the Roucouyenne and then followed an Emerillon trail over the spine of the Tumuk Humak Mountains. He descended the other side of the mountains to the Jari River, a tributary of the Amazon. By December 1877 he had reached the Brazilian city of Belém. He was nearly naked and had lost or used most of his possessions, and was believed by the Brazilian inhabitants to be an escaped French prisoner and was refused any help. He was eventually aided by a fellow Frenchman who bought him passage on a ship back to France. Upon returning to France, Crevaux gave an account of his journey to the Société de Géographie and was made a "Knight" of the Légion d'honneur.

Crevaux returned to French Guiana in August 1878. He set out once again into the interior of French Guiana, this time he traveled up the Oyapock River to its source and again crossed the Tumuk Humak Mountains, near his modern namesake, Crevaux Peak. He reached the Jari River again and traveled west up the Paru River and then came back down the Amazon. In November 1878 he arrived in Belém again. Crevaux soon left again up the Amazon to explore the Japurá River. He collected many biological specimens along the trip and returned to France where he was awarded the Gold Medal of the Société de Géographie.

Crevaux was sent on a third expedition with a group of scientists with the purpose of collecting botanical specimens in South America. The group traveled up the Magdalena River, crossed the Andes and descended the Guaviare River, that he baptizes rio de Lesseps, to the Orinoco River in Venezuelan territory. After having explored 3,400 km of river in 161 days arrived in the Orinoco delta in gulf of Paria, collected a large harvest of objects of botany, zoology and anthropology, Dr. Crevaux is exhausted and must rest some time among the Gouaraounos Indians. He returned to France on March 25, 1881, and was made an "Officer" of the Légion d'honneur.

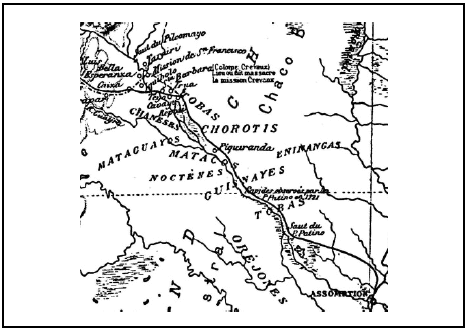
Journey of the explorer Émile-Arthur Thouar in search of the remains of Doctor Crevaux (1883)

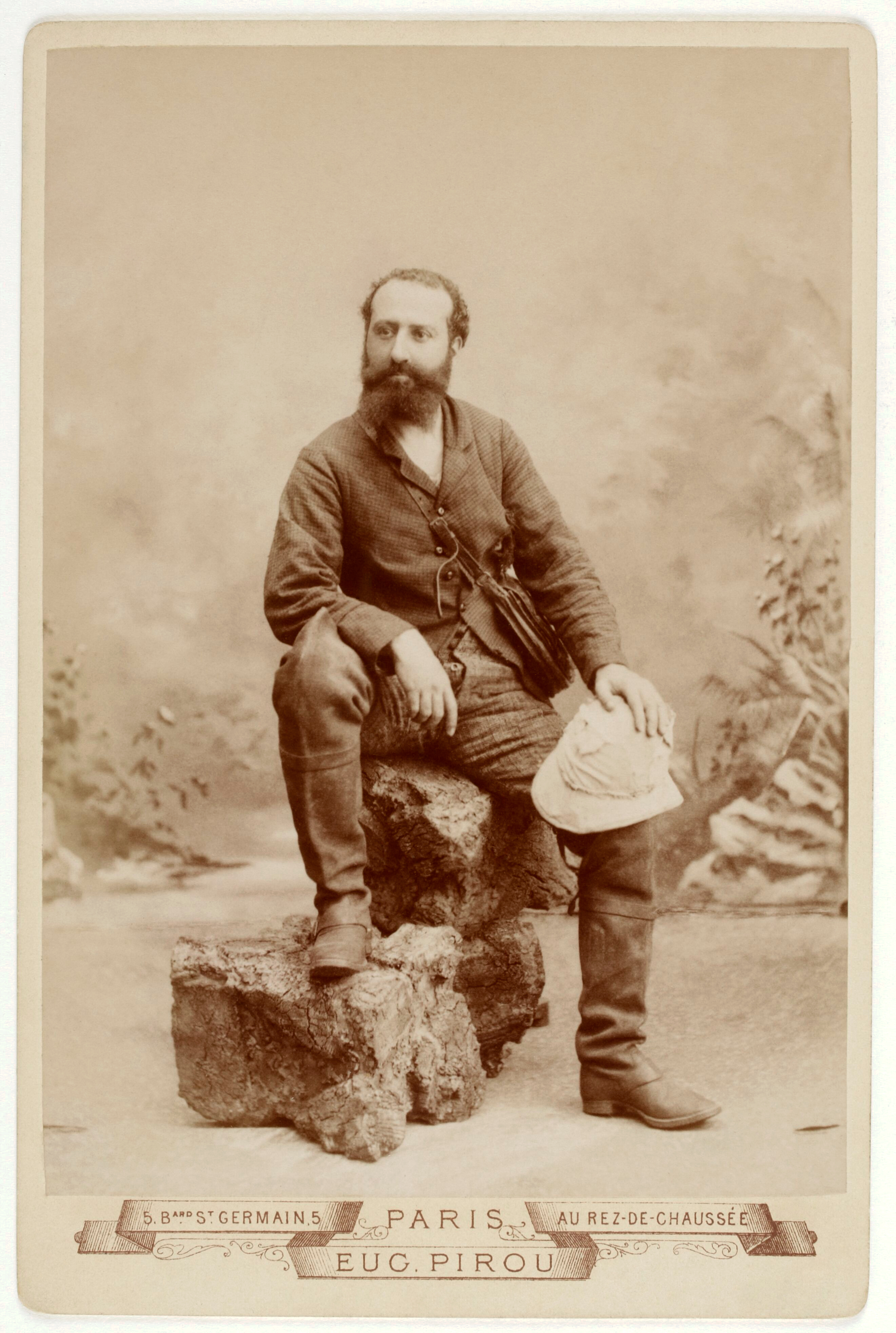
Émile-Arthur Thouar in 1883

Crevaux was asked to undertake a fourth expedition, this time to explore the boundaries of the Amazon and Paraguay river basins. He arrived in Argentina in December 1881 and was asked, by representatives of the Bolivian government, to explore the upper course of the Pilcomayo River. The expedition was transported to the Bolivian border and granted the services of two marines for protection. The party reached the Bolivian town of Tarija by March 1882. Here the party picked up a Toba guide girl named Yella Petrona, who agreed to guide the party through her people's territory. The expedition continued to the settlement of Caiza and found that the people of Caiza were at war with the Tobas. Despite the conflict, Crevaux decided to press forward and on April 19, 1882, Crevaux's party left Caiza to travel up the Pilcomayo. On April 27, 1882, Crevaux's party was invited to shore to eat with a group of Tobas where the expedition was ambushed and Crevaux was clubbed to death. In 1886 another French explorer, Arthur Thouar, found Yella Petrona and Crevaux's killers. Petrona admitted to telling the Tobas that Crevaux had come un-armed to take the Toba's fishing rights away, this led to the attack.
