= Apatou (captain) =

Aluku explorer and captain in French Guiana (1833–1908)

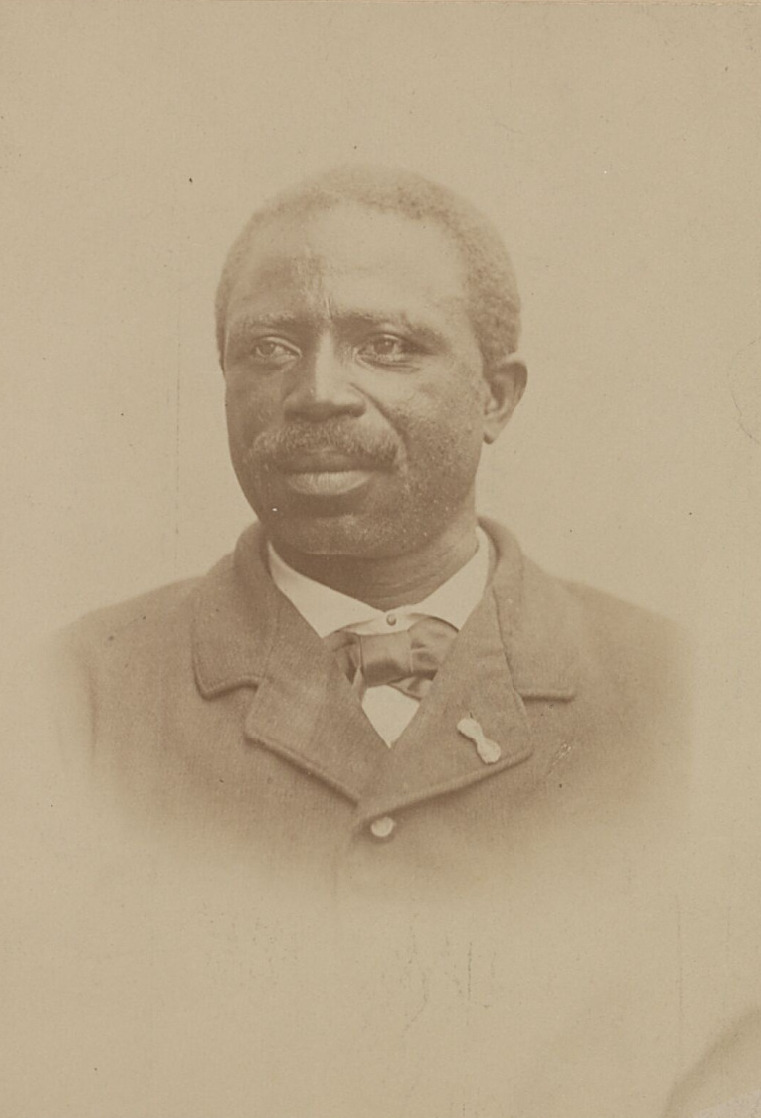
- Portrait of Apatou by J. M. Lopez
- Born: c. 1833; L'Enfant Perdu (nowadays: Papaichton, French Guiana, France)
- Died: 1 December 1908 (aged 75); Saint-Laurent-du-Maroni, French Guiana, France
- Other name: Joseph Paakiseli
- Occupations: explorer, village chief
- Known for: Founding of Apatou

Apatou (c. 1833 – 1 December 1908) was a guide, and Captain (village chief) of the Aluku Maroons in French Guiana. Apatou founded the village of Moutendé which has been renamed Apatou. He mediated between France and Suriname with regards to the border, and allied the Aluku with France.

== Biography ==
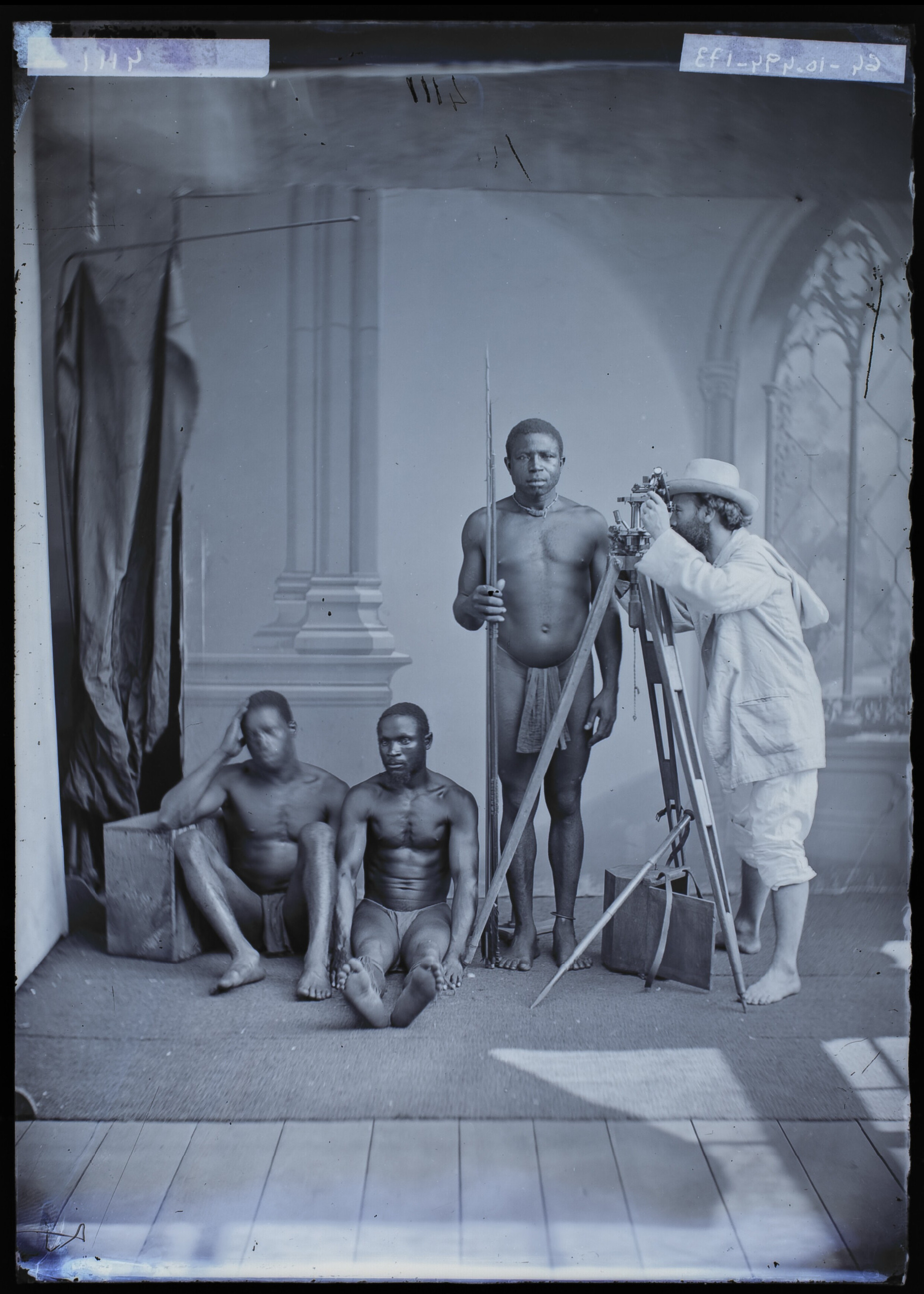
Apatou and Crevaux photographed in Brazil by Filipe Fidanza.

Apatou was born in about 1833 in L'Enfant Perdu on the Lawa River. He was of a Surinamese origins of Aluku people. In 1877, the French explorer Jules Crevaux embarked on an expedition of the Maroni River. During his journey, he met Apatou who joined him as one of his guides. Apatou accompanied Crevaux to the end of the river until they arrived at a village of Roucouyennes at the foot of the Tumuk Humak Mountains.

Crevaux returned to French Guiana in 1878 for a second expedition during which he wanted to explore the Oyapock River, Apatou agreed to join him on the condition that Crevaux would take him to France after the journey. Apatou, Crevaux, and a former pirate named Santa-Cruz, descended the Oyapock, crossed the Tumuk Humak Mountains and followed the Amazon River to the territory of the Ouitotos in Colombia. After the expedition, Apatou traveled to Paris. While in Paris, he was awarded a gold medal by the Société de Géographie.

He returned to his village as a celebrity for not only having explored the Amazon, but also having visited France. He became the main negotiator with the French. In 1881, he arranged that five children could go to school in Saint-Laurent-du-Maroni. His close contacts with the colonial government, were a source of jealousy and rivalry within the tribe, therefore Apatou founded the village Moutendé on the Maroni River in 1882 which quickly prospered. In 1883, Apatou accompanied Henri Coudreau on his exploration of French Guiana. On 7 September 1885, Jules Brunetti opened a Catholic mission in the village. In 1887, Apatou was officially appointed Captain (village chief) under Granman Anato. He was recognized and received a salary from the French colonial government.

The border between France and Suriname at the time was unclear. Both nations promised to respect the rights of the tribes living on the river, therefore the tribes had to choose their nationality. In 1891, Apatou mediated with regards to the border, and allied the Aluku with France. He also united all the different tribes on the French side. The same year, he was knighted in the Royal Order of Cambodia for his work with Casey who was station chief for the Lawa River.

Apatou died on 1 December 1908 in Saint-Laurent-du-Maroni at the age of 75. The village of Moutendé was later renamed Apatou in his honour. On 12 November 1976, Apatou became an independent commune. In 1998, a statue of Apatou was erected opposite the town hall.

== Gallery ==
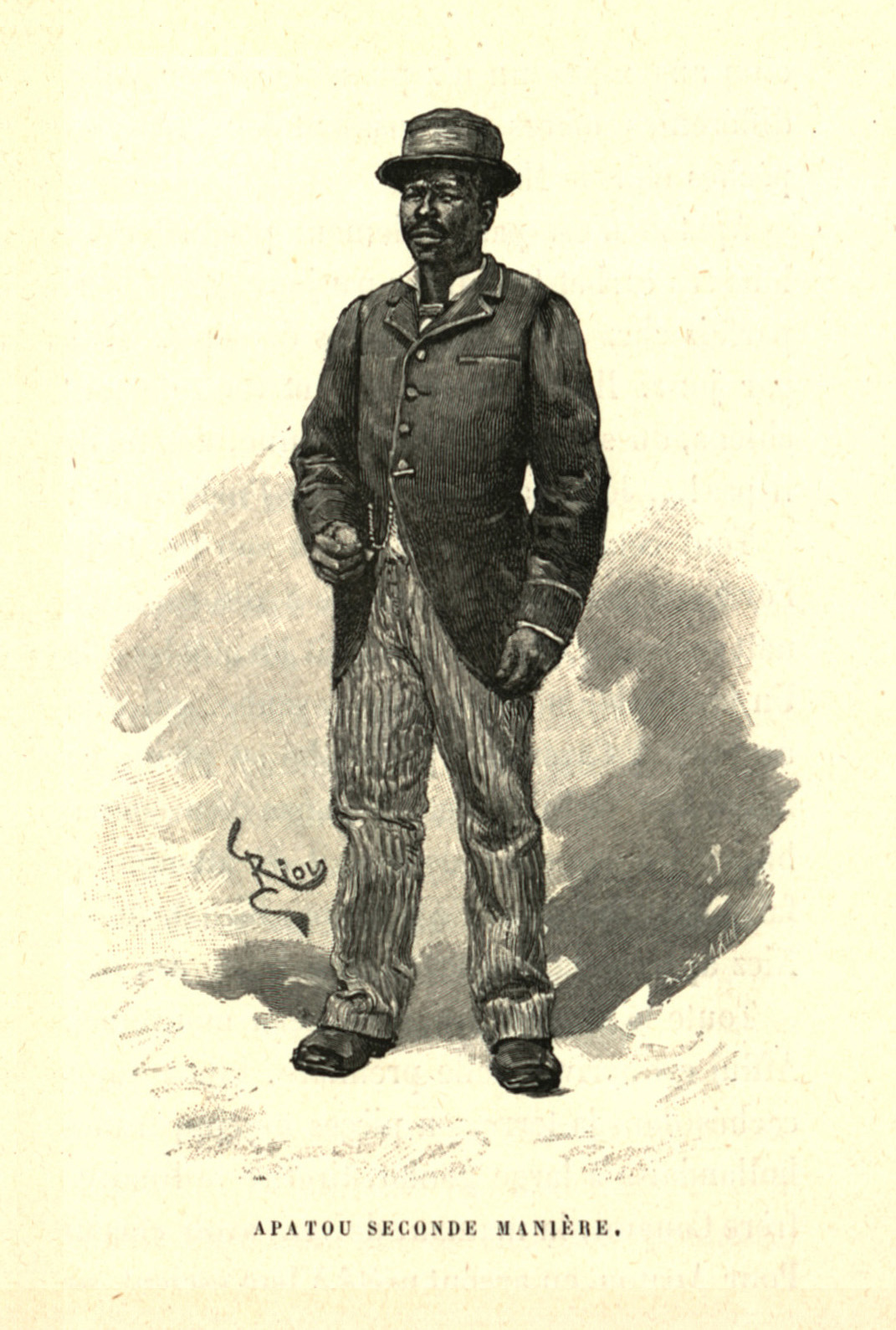
Drawing of Apatou by Édouard Riou

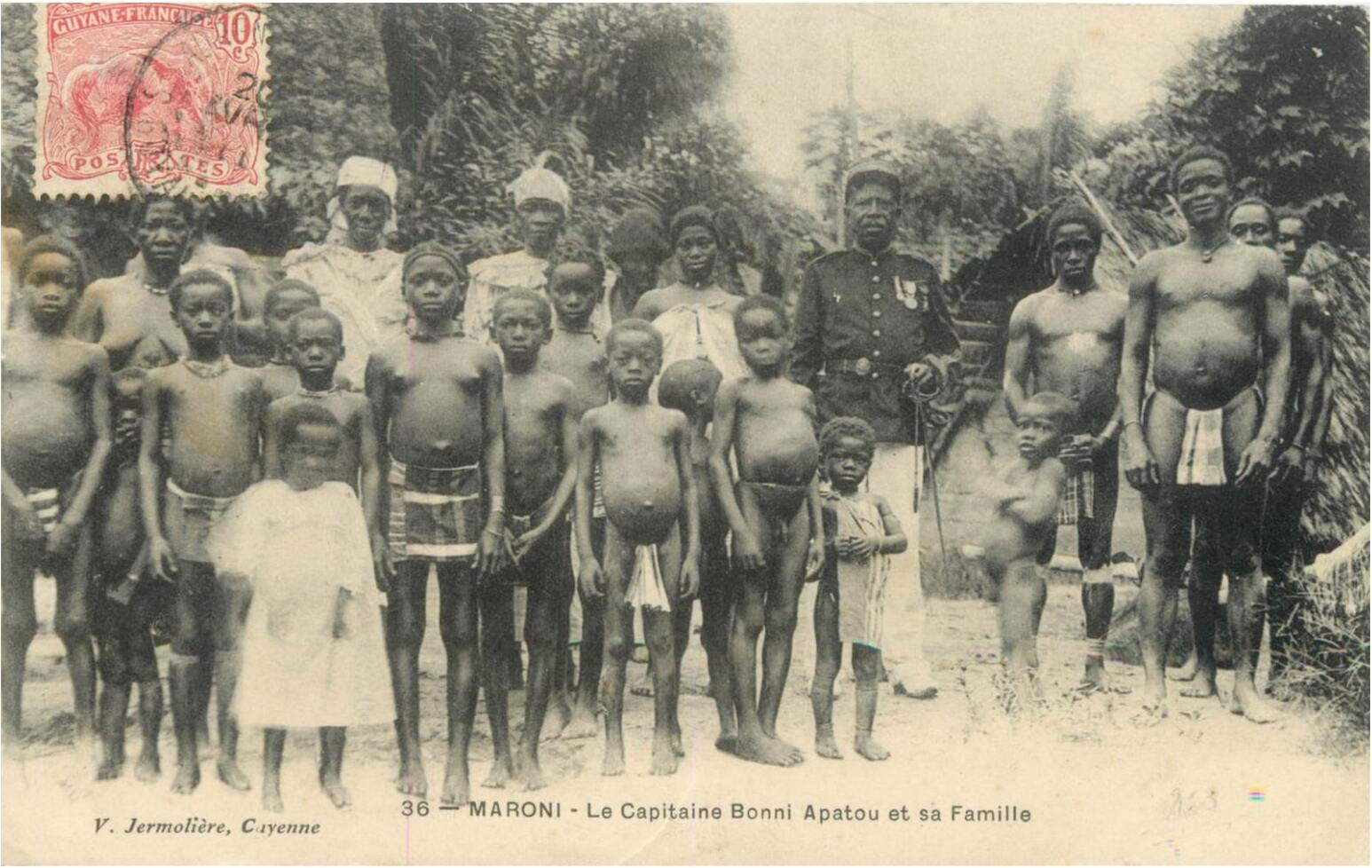
Apatou (in uniform) and his family

== Bibliography ==
- Bilby, Kenneth M. (2004). "The explorer as hero: 'Le Fidèle Apatou' in the French wilderness". New West Indian Guide / Nieuwe West-Indische Gids. 78 (3–4). Brill Publishers: 197–227. doi:10.1163/13822373-90002512.
- Crevaux, Jules Nicolas (1883). Voyages dans l'Amérique du Sud (in French). Paris: Hachette.
- Moomou, Jean (2009). "La mission du père Brunetti chez les Boni de la Guyane française à la fin du xixe siècle". Histoire Monde et Cultures Religieuses. Histoire et missions chrétiennes (in French). 12 (2009/4): 115–144. doi:10.3917/hmc.012.0115.
- Scholtens, Ben (1994). Bosneger en overheid in Suriname. Radboud University Nijmegen (Thesis) (in Dutch). Paramaribo: Afdeling Cultuurstudies/Minov. ISBN 9991410155.
