= France–Suriname border =

Partially disputed international border

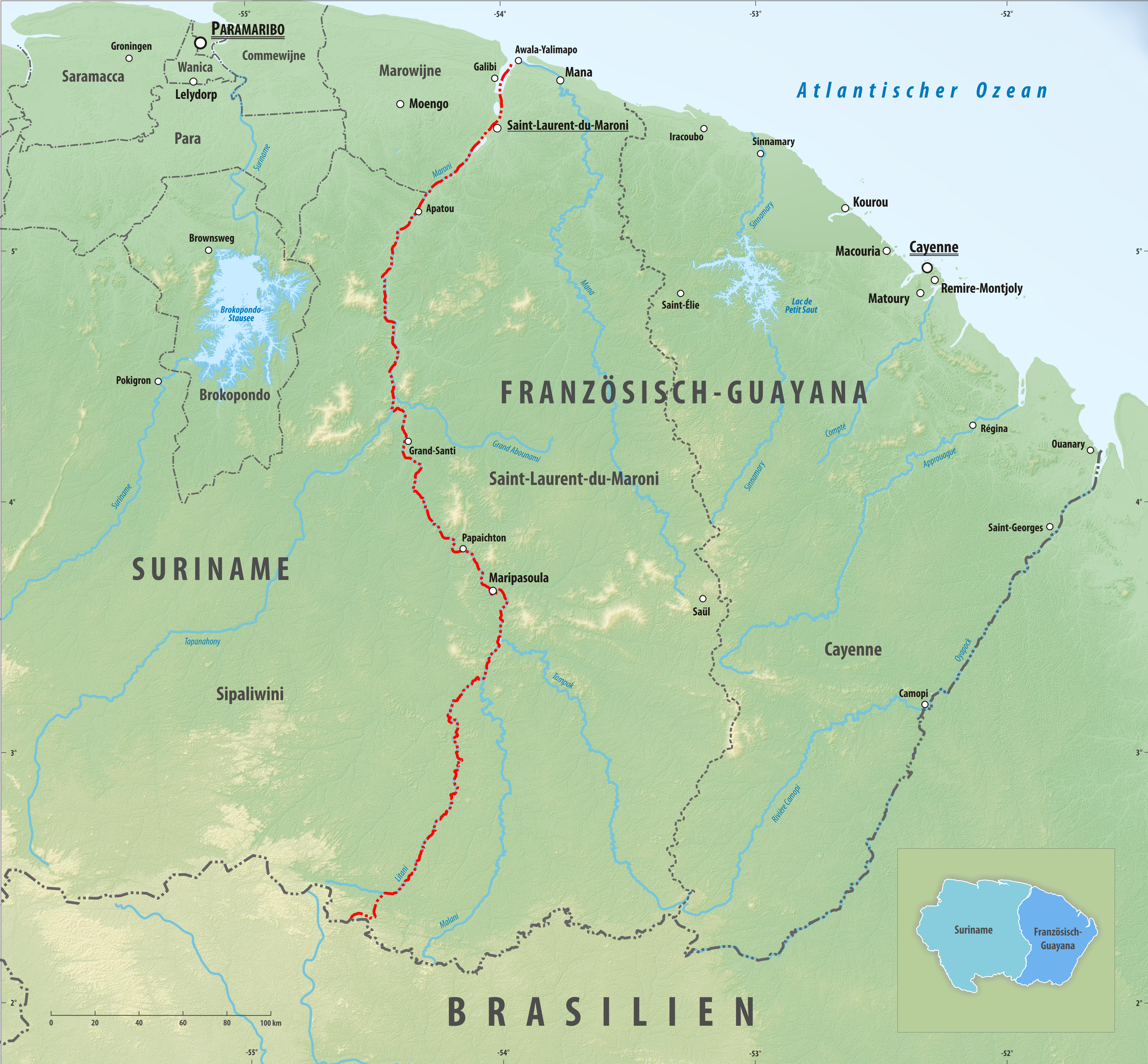
- The current border (disputed) between French Guiana and Suriname.

Characteristics
- Entities: France Suriname
- Length: 520 kilometres (320 mi)

History
- Established: 1915; Resolved dispute as arbitrated by Tsar Alexander III in 1891
- Current shape: 2021; Partially resolved dispute of the Lawa River portion of the border

The France–Suriname or French Guiana–Suriname border is a roughly 520-kilometer line that internationally separates French Guiana (an overseas department of France) and Suriname. In 1915, the border was decided upon, following the Maroni River for its northern portion, but the southernmost section of the border remains disputed despite numerous attempts to officially and formally demarcate it. Particularly, the debate is over which Lawa River sub-tributary should be considered the international border between the two nations. In addition to the land border, France, through its overseas department, and Suriname, share an approximately 200-nautical mile maritime border that was fully demarcated in 2017.

== Southern river tributary dispute ==
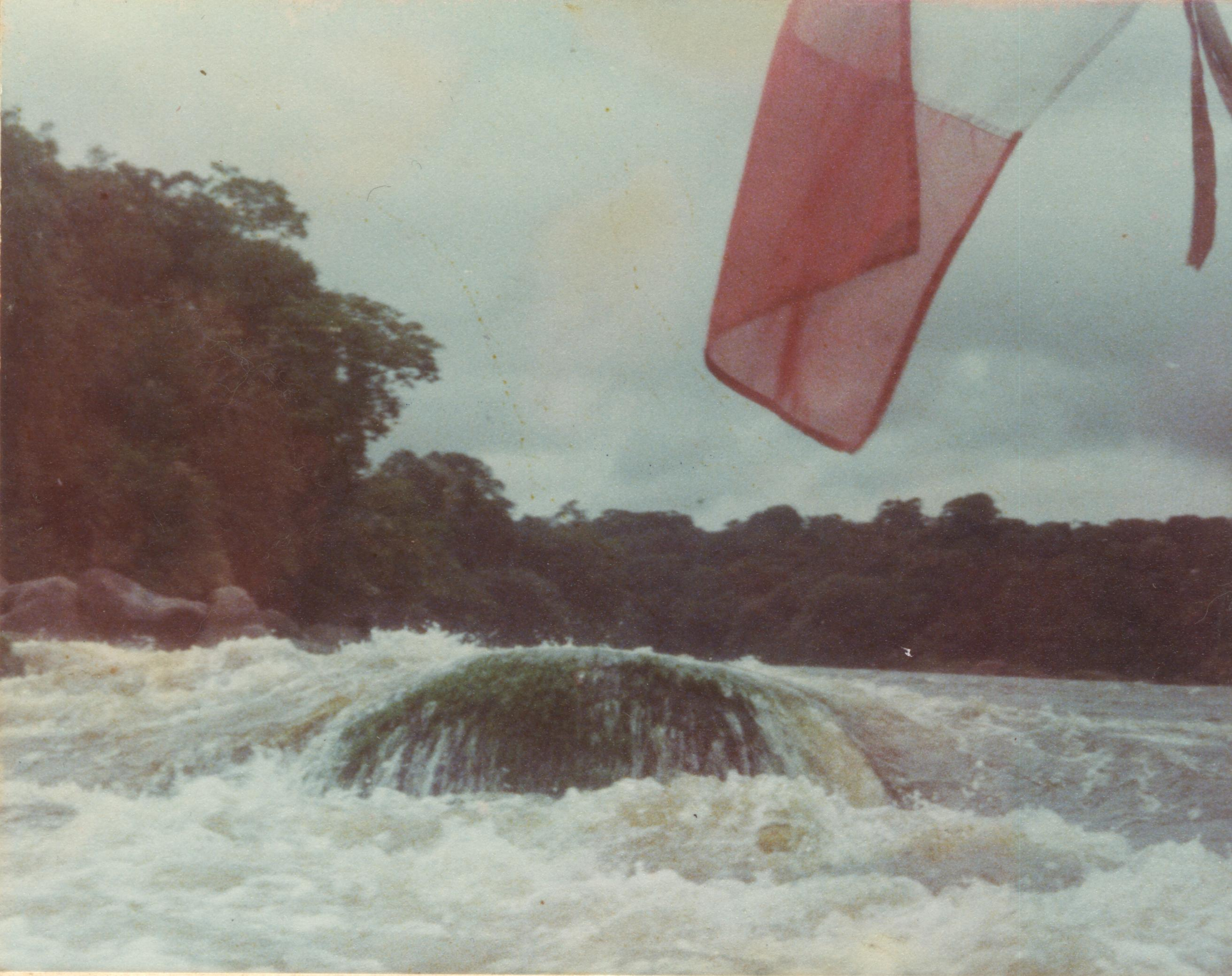
The Maroni River in 1979

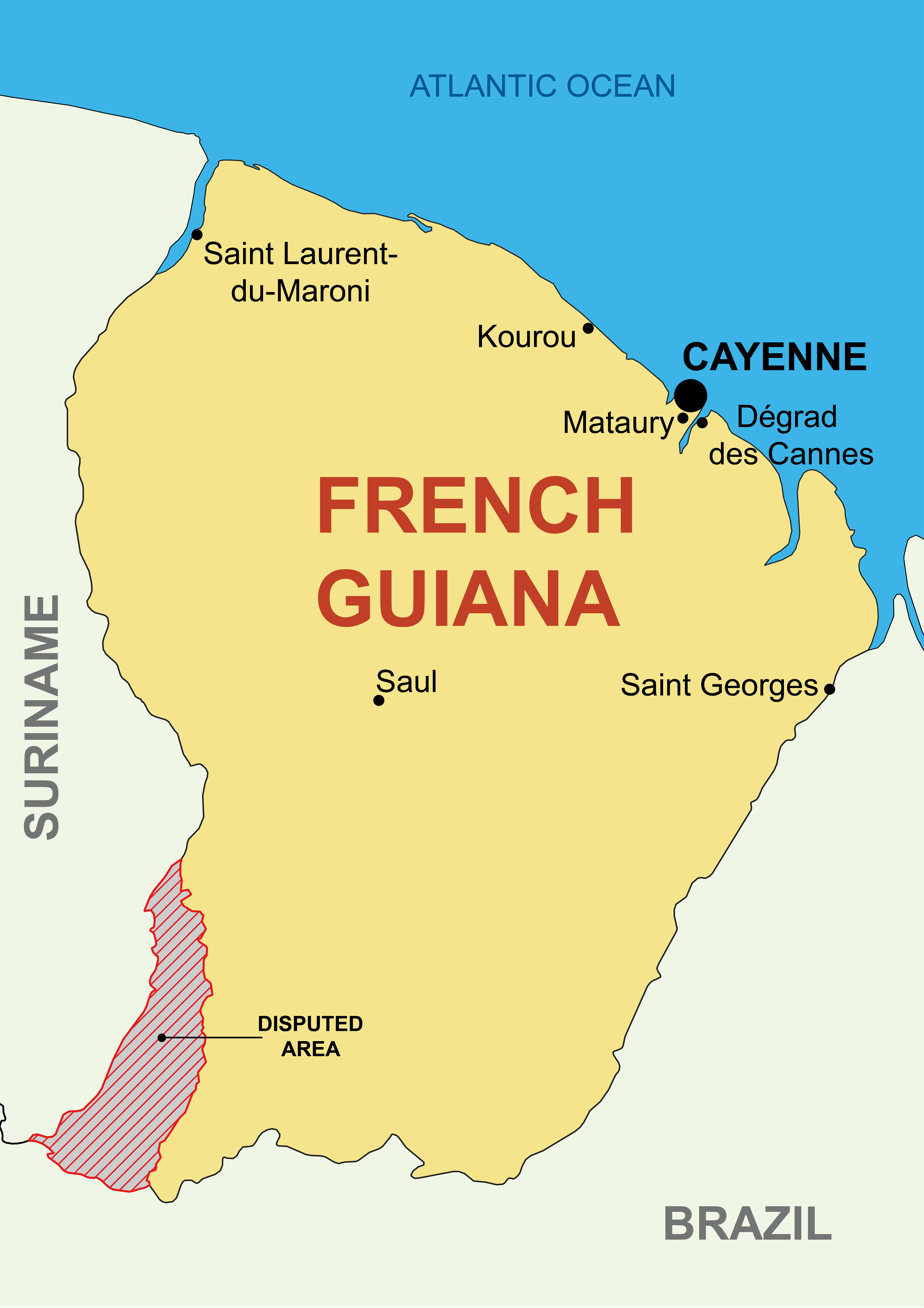
A map of French Guiana, with disputed territory between the Itany and Marouini sub-tributaries striped red.

There exists a dispute between France and Suriname about the tributary that forms the southern extension of the border, the Itany, a sub-tributary of the Lawa River, or the more eastern Marouini, another sub-tributary of the Lawa. Many maps depict the border along the Itany River, the easternmost tributary favored by France. However, Suriname disagrees with this decision, and recognizes the border as following the Marouini. The area between these two rivers is an approximately 5,000 square mile disputed territory commonly referred to as the Marouini River Tract, a rural and forested area with a small population; it is believed to hold potentially valuable mineral deposits despite neither government formally surveying the natural resources present in the area. Prior to 1975, Suriname was a Dutch colony.

In 1836, Dutch and French officials sat down to determine the border between their colonies. The Maroni was decided upon as the border from the Caribbean Sea to the now tripoint border with Brazil. However, the headwaters of the river were unknown to them, so it was to be decided between the Tapahoni or the Lawa tributaries as the southernmost portion of the border. This went unaddressed for 30 years until in 1861 another meeting was held to determine the dividing tributary. The Lawa was decided upon after the colonists' exploration into the river. However, this was only agreed upon by the colonists, and the governments of both nations disagreed with this resolution. 13 years later, in 1874 (and throughout the next couple decades), gold was discovered in the Marouini River Tract, leading to further attention to the area by the French and the Dutch, the latter requesting a third-party arbitrator to put an end to the dispute. Tsar Alexander III decided to take action, and in May of 1891 the Tsar ruled in favor of the Dutch government, stating the Lawa shall be the official border. However, a new question was to be answered; whether or not the Marouini or Itany sub-tributaries of the Lawa should act as a border, the dispute still partially unresolved to this day.

A major development in the dispute occurred in 2021, when both governments agreed upon two-thirds of the river boundary, from the mouth of the Maroni to the village of Antécume-Pata. However, a portion of the disputed territory remains uncertain as of 2025, specifically most of the Lawa dispute.

== List of border settlements ==
=== French Guiana ===
- Antécume-Pata (village)
- Apatou (commune)
- Grand-Santi (commune)
- Maripasoula (commune)
- Papaichton (commune)
- Saint-Laurent-du-Maroni (commune)

=== Suriname ===
- Albina (town)
- Benzdorp (village)
- Cottica Lawa (village)
- Kawemhakan (village)
- Stoelmanseiland (village)

== See also ==
- France–Suriname relations
- Borders of France
- Borders of Suriname
- List of territorial disputes
