= Cottica Mountain =

Mountain in French Guiana

- Lebi Dotsi
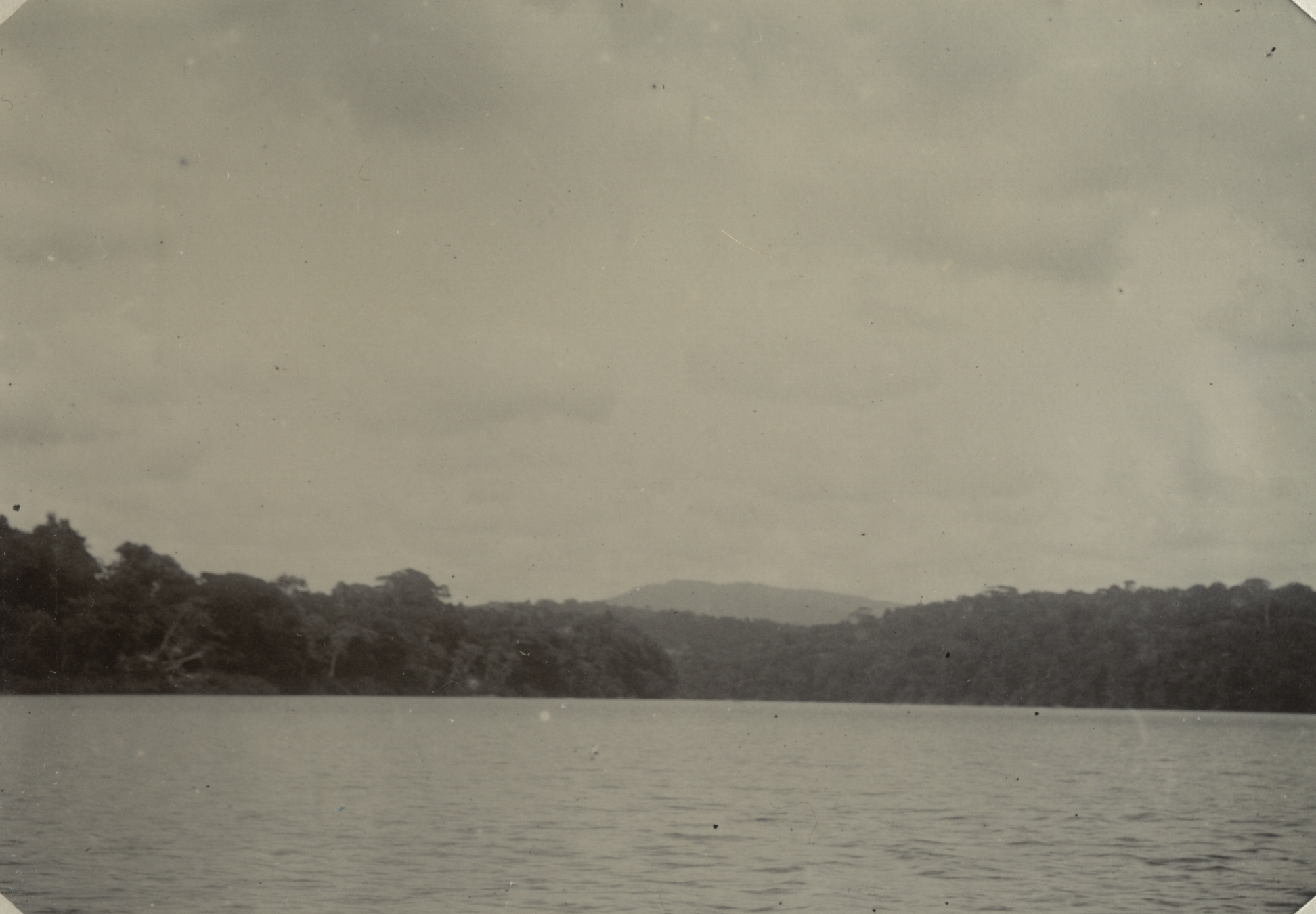
- The Cottica Mountain in the distance (1903)

Highest point
- Elevation: 744 m (2,441 ft)
- Coordinates: 3.9331°N 54.1850°W

Geography
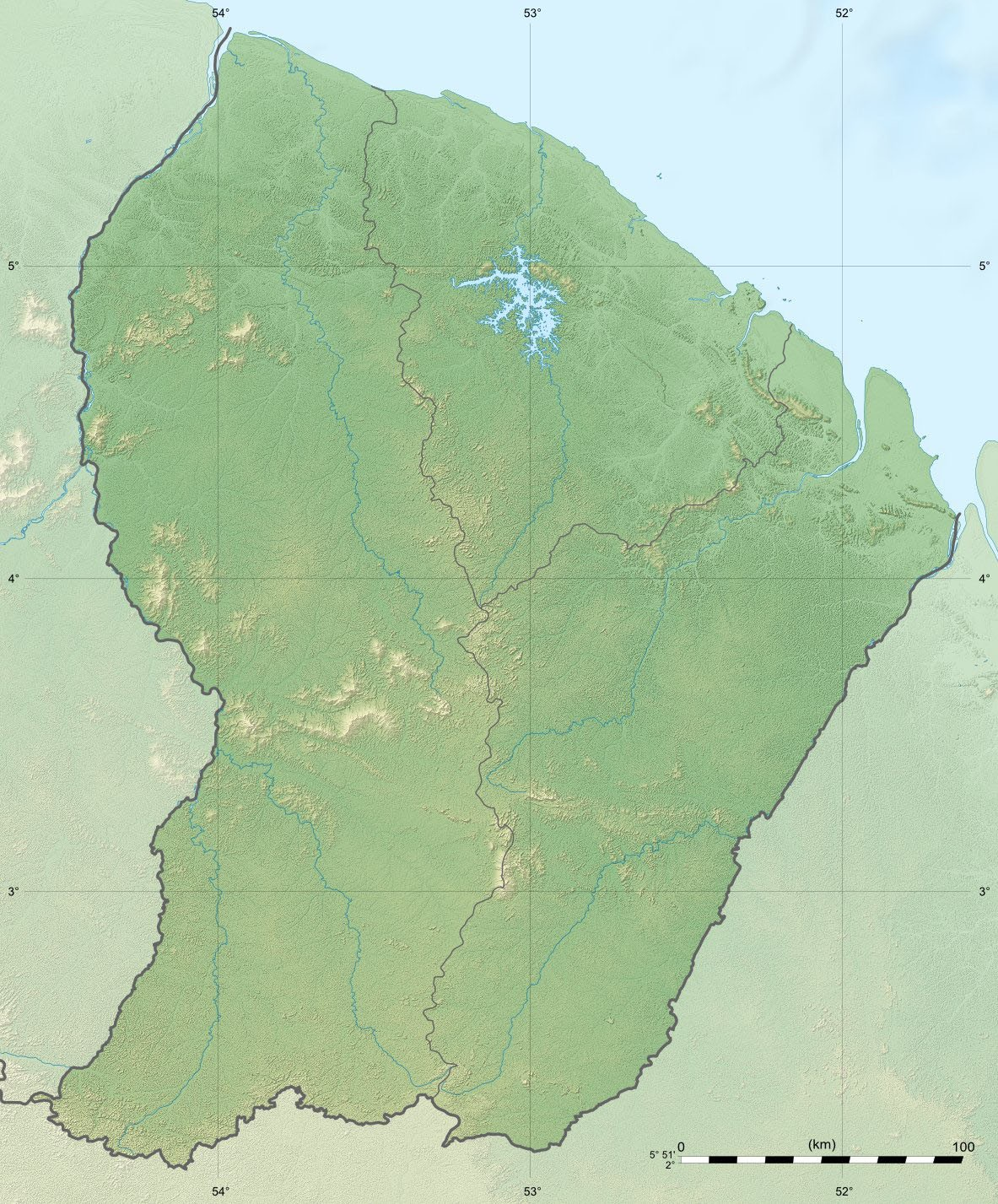
- Location within French Guiana
- Location: Papaichton, French Guiana

Cottica Mountain (also Kotika Mountain. French: Montagne Cottica. Aluku: Lebi Dotsi) is a 744-metre high (2,441 ft) mountain near the Lawa River in the commune of Papaichton in French Guiana, France.

== Overview ==
Cottica Mountain is close to the Surinamese village of Cottica. In both cases, the name refers to the Aluku Maroons who initially settled along the Cottica River, and were later driven to the interior of French Guiana. Cottica Mountain rises up from the Lawa River and dominates the area.

The mountain was ignored by scientists until 2005 when two naturalists started investigating the area, and discovered a remarkable biodiversity. The steep descend from the mountain to the river has resulted in a diverse number of plant species, and created wild streams descending through the rainforest. In 2014, an area of 4,813 hectares (11,890 acres) was designated as ZNIEFF, an important natural environment.
