= Apatou =

Commune in French Guiana, France

- Commune
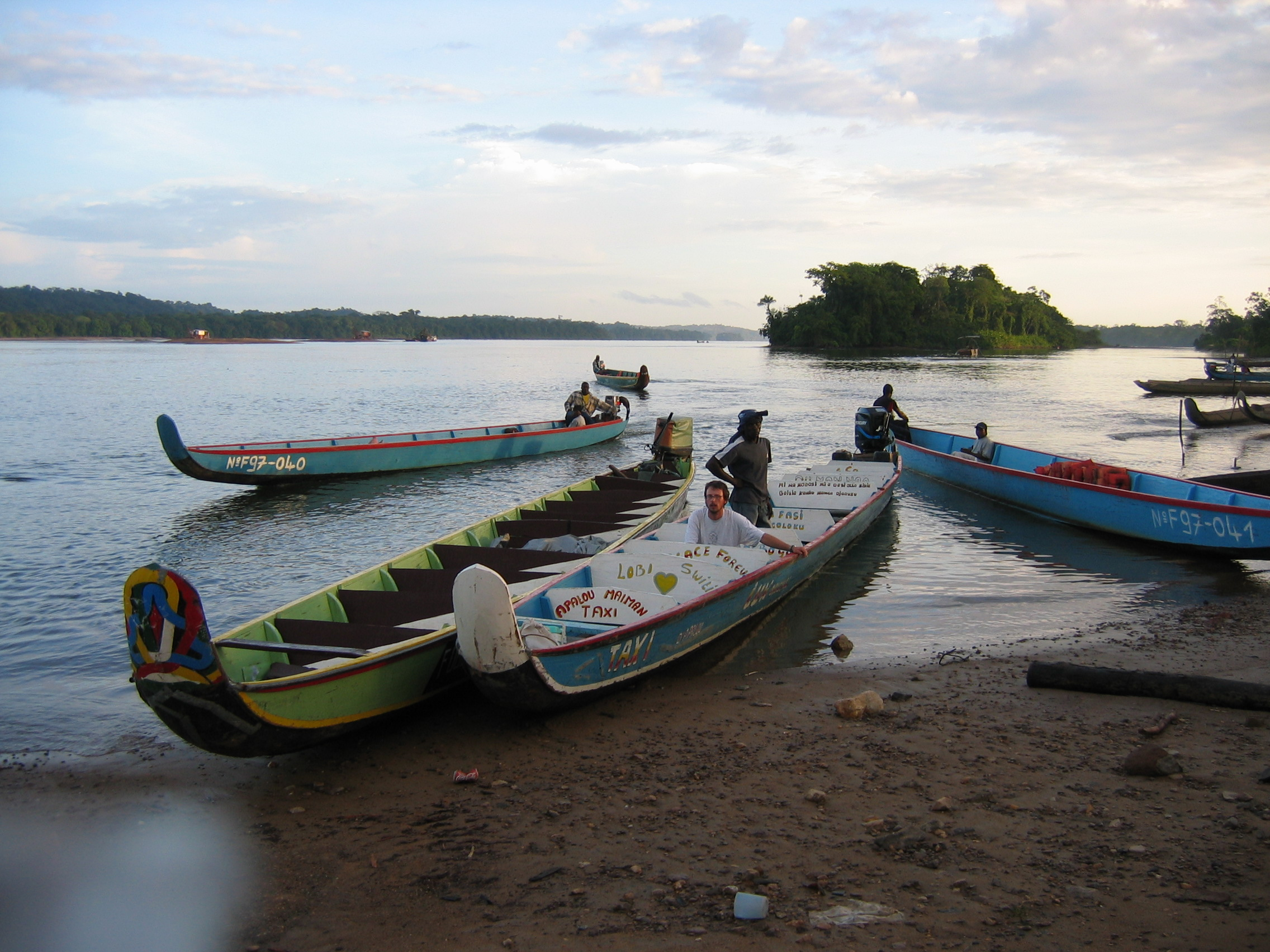
- Canoe taxis at Apatou

- Coat of arms

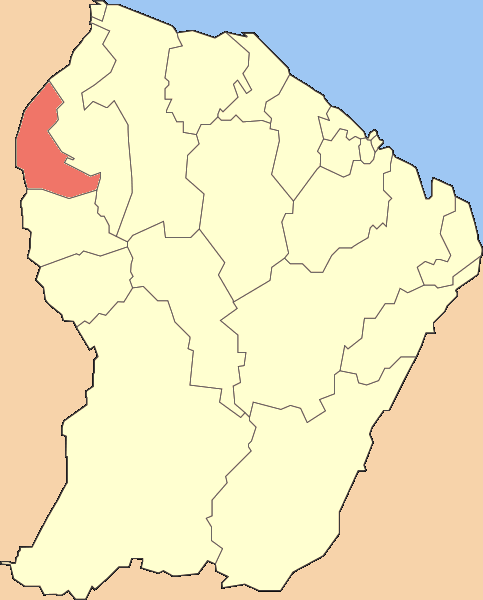
- Location of the commune (in red) within French Guiana
- Location of Apatou
- Location within France
- Coordinates: 5°09′12″N 54°20′10″W
- Country: France
- Overseas region and department: French Guiana
- Arrondissement: Saint-Laurent-du-Maroni
- Intercommunality: Ouest Guyanais

Government
  - Mayor (2021–2026): Moïse Edwin
- Area^{1}: 2,020 km^{2} (780 sq mi)
- Population (2023): 10,306
  - Density: 5.10/km^{2} (13.2/sq mi)
- Time zone: UTC−03:00
- INSEE/Postal code: 97360 /97317
- ^{1} French Land Register data, which excludes lakes, ponds, glaciers > 1 km^{2} (0.386 sq mi or 247 acres) and river estuaries.

Apatou (French pronunciation: [apatu]) is a commune in French Guiana, an overseas region and department of France in South America. Apatou is home to Maroons of the Aluku, Paramacca, Ndyuka, and Saramaka tribes.

== History ==
The town of Apatou was founded in 1882 as Moutendé. It was renamed after Captain Apatou of the Aluku. In the late 19th century, Apatou was a guide for the explorer Jules Crevaux. On 7 September 1885, Jules Brunetti opened a Catholic mission in the village. In 1891, Apatou mediated between France and the Colony of Suriname with regards to the border, and allied the Aluku with France. He also united all the different tribes on the French side.

Apatou was up to 1969 part of the Inini territory which allowed for an autonomous and self sufficient tribal system for the Maroons without clear borders. Along with the commune, came a government structure, and francisation. Most importantly, it led to the concentration in bigger villages and the near abandonment of smaller settlements.

The commune of Apatou was created on 12 November 1976 by detaching its territory from the commune of Grand-Santi-Papaichton (since then renamed Grand-Santi).

== Population ==
Historical population
| Year | Pop. | ±% p.a. |
|---|---|---|
| 1967 | 318 | — |
| 1974 | 453 | +5.18% |
| 1982 | 618 | +3.96% |
| 1990 | 2,451 | +18.79% |
| 1999 | 3,628 | +4.45% |
| 2007 | 6,357 | +7.26% |
| 2012 | 7,257 | +2.68% |
| 2017 | 9,241 | +4.95% |
| 2023 | 10,306 | +1.83% |
Source: INSEE

== Transport ==
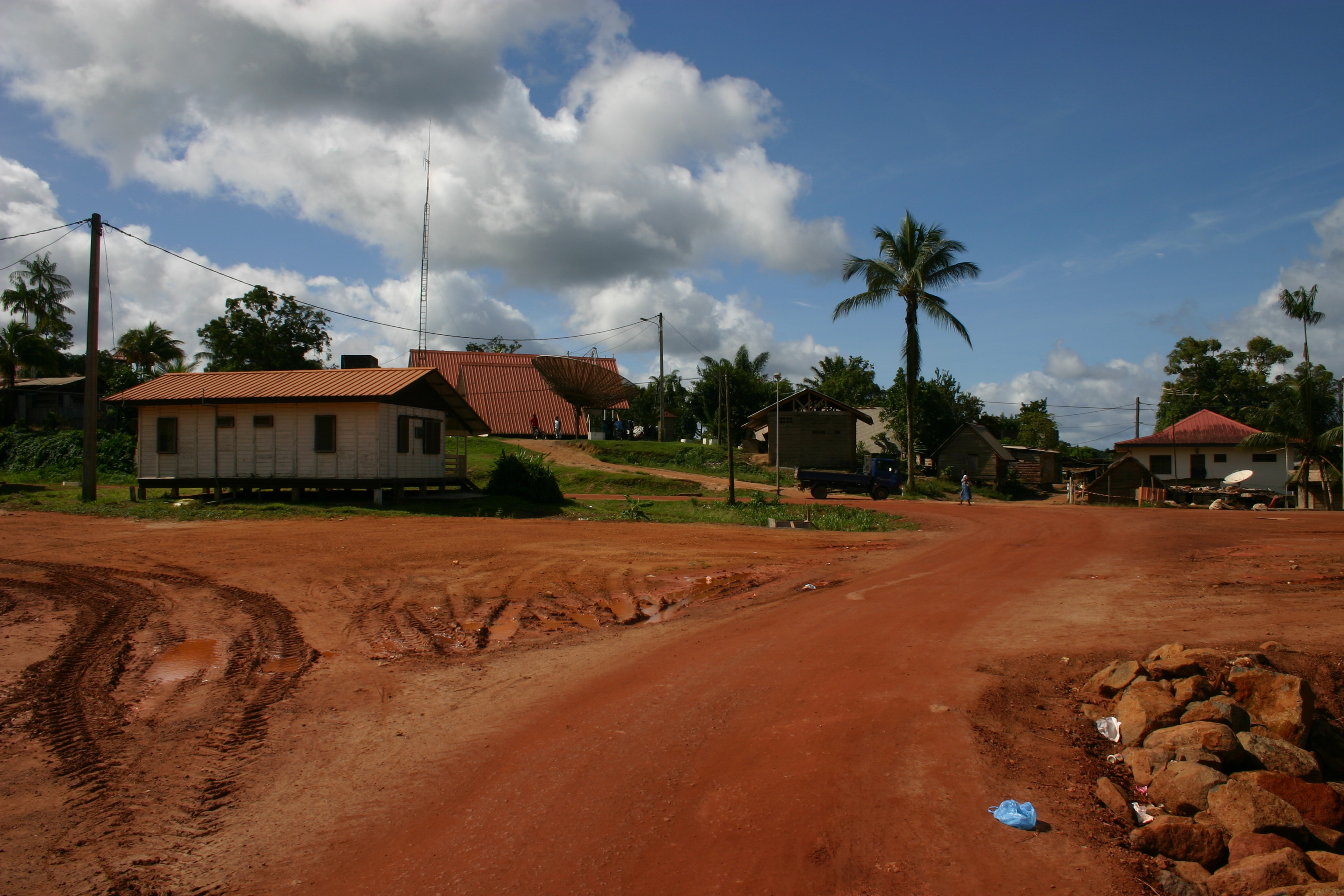
Apatou, 2004

The villages in the commune could only to be reached by boat from the Maroni River. In 2010, Route Nationale opened connecting Apatou with Saint-Laurent-du-Maroni, and the road network of French Guiana. The road was opened with the Tour of Guiana. The road is scheduled to be extended to Maripasoula. Construction work on the section to Papaïchton is planned to begin in 2021.

== Sports ==
Apatou is home to ASC Agouado football team who play at the Stade de Moutendé.

== See also ==
- Communes of French Guiana
- Lucifer Dékou-Dékou Biological Reserve, a wilderness area in the commune.
- Providence, a village in the commune.
