= Boniville =

Boniville Agoodé
- Village
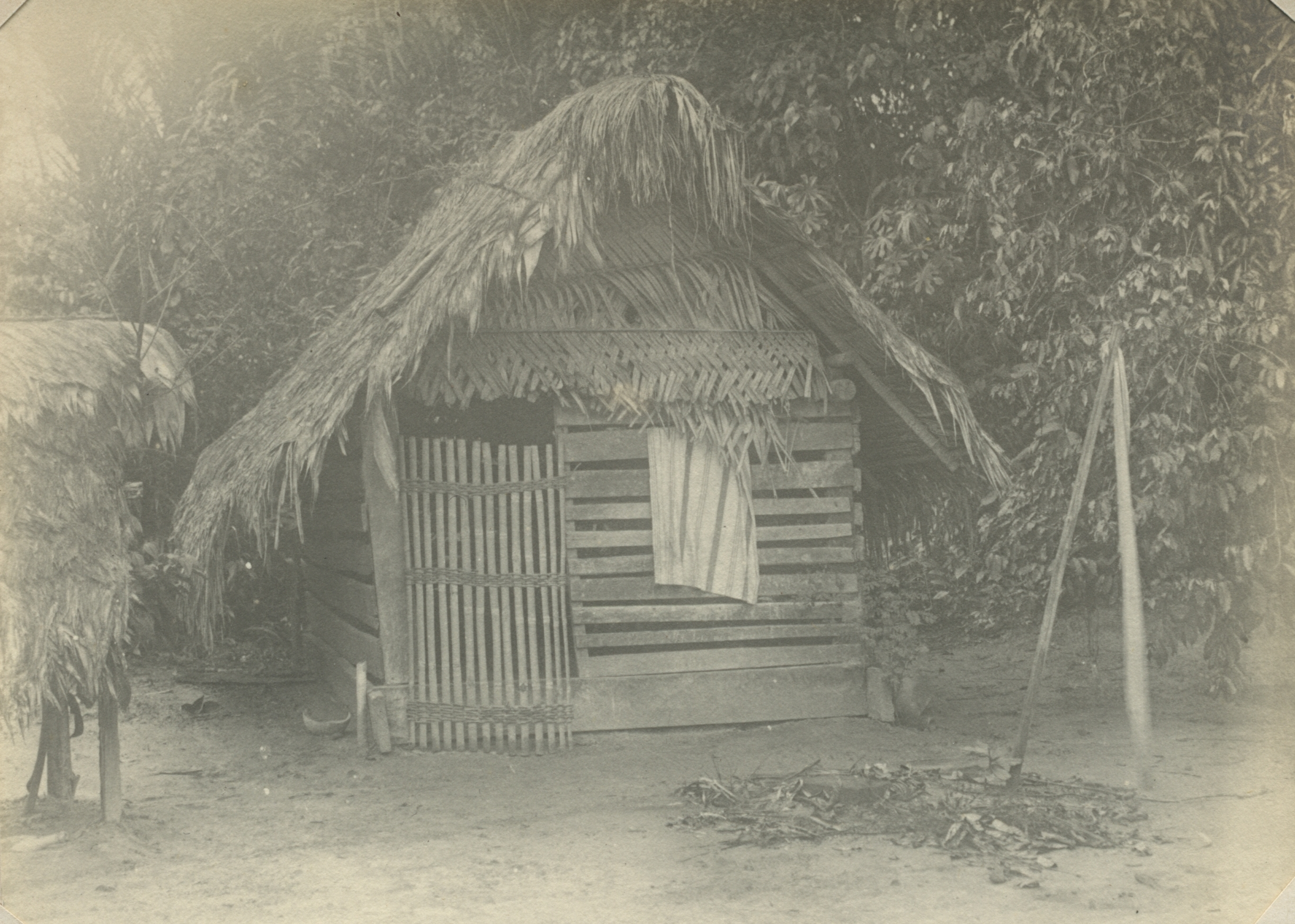
- Winti hut in Boniville (1903) (Note: The hut contained a clay statue of Granmama Gron (Grandmother Earth) who was the local god of the village.)

- Location in French Guiana
- Coordinates: 3.8339°N 54.1855°W
- Country: France
- Overseas region: French Guiana
- Arrondissement: Saint-Laurent-du-Maroni
- Commune: Papaïchton

Boniville (French pronunciation: [bɔnivil]; also Agoodé) is a village in the commune of Papaïchton located on the Lawa River in French Guiana. It was primarily inhabited by the Aluku people. The village lies upstream from the Cottica rapids.

== History ==
On 25 May 1891, the Aluku, a tribe of escaped slaves from Suriname, became French citizens, and Granman Ochi became the first officially recognized paramount chief of the tribe. The village was primarily inhabited by the Aluku people, also known as the Boni, one of the four main Maroon (Bushinengué) groups in the territory. Boniville was formerly known as Agoodé, a name believed to derive from the phonetic transformation of the name of French colonial governor Louis Albert Grodet, who officially recognized the Boni settlement between 1891 and 1893. The village was established as the political capital of the so-called "Boni country" in 1892, coinciding with the French colonial administration's recognition of the authority of Ochi (paramount chief). In 1895, Ochi founded the village of Boniville to serve as the administrative centre for the tribe.

In 1965, Granman Tolinga moved the capital from Boniville to Papaïchton, and as of 1993, Boniville is a village within the commune of Papaïchton. The village was closely associated with the lo Dikan clan, which has since become extinct. The village has lost its importance, and has been reduced to a small hamlet. Boniville is still characterised by traditional Aluku architecture with tembé (painted and carved wood work). In 2017, five traditional houses in Boniville and Loca were restored by the National Forests Office.

== Preservation ==
Boniville and neighboring Loka are home to traditional Aluku wooden houses (cases traditionnelles aluku), which are notable for their architectural and cultural value. These dwellings are typically small, constructed with round or sawn wood, and feature inverted V-shaped roofs with carved gables known as Koppo.

These structures form the historical and ceremonial core of the village, where ancestral rituals such as mortuary vigils, brokodé (mourning rites), and puu-baaka (lifting of mourning) continue to be practiced. However, the houses face deterioration due to climatic conditions and lack of maintenance.

Since the 1990s, local and regional actors have initiated preservation efforts. In 2008, the Papaïchton town hall, in partnership with Aluku customary authorities, began a project to inventory and restore traditional structures. The initiative received technical and financial support from the Guiana Amazonian Park (PAG) and the Regional Directorate of Cultural Affairs of Guyana (DAC). A comprehensive survey was conducted in 2012, followed by an architectural assessment in 2013 that identified 22 houses for potential historical classification.

A cultural mediation mission was carried out in 2014 to assess the community’s expectations regarding heritage preservation. A first phase of physical restoration began in 2016, combining traditional knowledge with modern techniques and involving apprentices to transmit ancestral building skills. As of 2019, the reconstructed house of Gran Man Awensaï, a former Aluku leader, serves as a meeting place for customary chiefs.

== Transport ==
Papaïchton can only be accessed by plane from the Maripasoula Airport, or by boat via the Lawa river. There is an unpaved path to Maripasoula. On 20 July 2020, construction has started on a proper road which is scheduled to be completed by 2021.

== Bibliography ==
- Fleury, Marie (2 March 2018). "Gaan Mawina, le Marouini (haut Maroni) au cœur de l'histoire des Noirs marrons Boni/Aluku et des Amérindiens Wayana1". Revue d'ethnoécologie (13). doi:10.4000/ethnoecologie.3534. ISSN 2267-2419.
- Scholtens, Ben (1994). Bosneger en overheid in Suriname. Radboud University Nijmegen (Thesis) (in Dutch). Paramaribo: Afdeling Cultuurstudies/Minov. ISBN 9991410155.
- Wood, Sarah; MacLeod, Catriona (1 November 2018). Locating Guyane. Liverpool University Press. doi:10.3828/liverpool/9781786941114.001.0001. ISBN 978-1-78694-111-4.
