= Cormotibo =

Cormotibo Cormontibo, Kormotibo
- Village
- Cormotibo, along the western border with Suriname on the Maroni River.
- Coordinates: 3.7951°N 54.1172°W
- Country: France
- Overseas region: French Guiana
- Arrondissement: Saint-Laurent-du-Maroni
- Commune: Papaïchton
- Elevation: 347 m (1,138 ft)
- Time zone: UTC-3

Cormotibo (Cormontibo, Kormotibo) is a village in western French Guiana, close to the border with Suriname, it is inhabited by Aluku Maroons. The village has been founded by Hervé Tolinga, the son of the granman.

In 1943, the village was described as being in decline. As of 2020, the village still exists near Papaichton.
