= Nouveau Wakapou =

Nouveau Wakapou Nouveau Wacapou
- Location in French Guiana
- Coordinates: 3°40′27.8″N 54°04′32.9″W
- Country: France
- Overseas region: French Guiana
- Arrondissement: Saint-Laurent-du-Maroni
- Commune: Maripasoula

Population (2022)
  - Total: 150

Nouveau Wakapou, also Nouveau Wacapou, is an Aluku maroon village situated on the Lawa River in French Guiana. The village is located across the Surinamese gold mining village of Benzdorp.

== Overview ==
In the early 20th century gold was discovered in the region which caused an exponential growth of Nouveau Wakapou. By 1938, the population was about 1,000 people and it was largest village of the region, however the village started to decline from the 1950s onwards. Around 2022, the population was around 150 people and it was mainly inhabited by Aluku maroons. Most of the inhabitants adhere to the Seventh-day Adventist Church.

In 2003, a school was built in Nouveau Wakapou. There are no shops in the village, and it is dependent on Maripasoula or Benzdorp. The Mankassiaba Soula rapids are located near the village in the Lawa River.

== Transport ==
Nouveau Wakapou is located about 20 minutes downstream from Maripasoula. It can also be reached by car from Maripasoula by taking the road to Papaichton, and taking a turn near the airport.
