= Cottica =

Cottica Cottica Lawa Cotticadorp
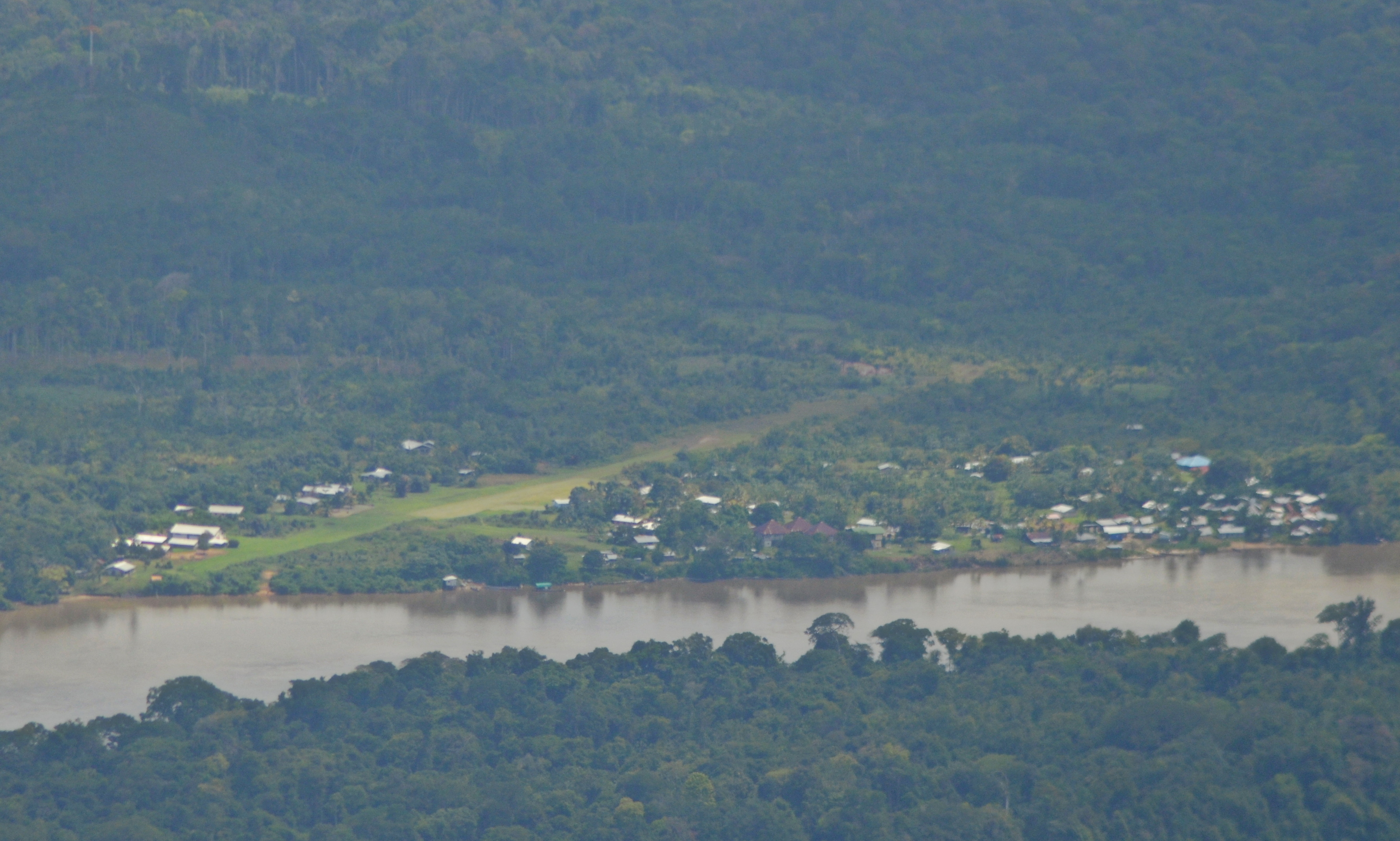
- Cottica viewed from the air

- Location in Suriname
- Coordinates: 3°51′15″N 54°13′41″W
- Country: Suriname
- District: Sipaliwini District
- Resort: Tapanahony

Cottica Lawa, often shortened to Cottica and also called Cotticadorp is a village in the district of Sipaliwini, Suriname. It is located in the east, along the Marowijne River and the border with French Guiana. The village has a school, and a clinic.

== History ==
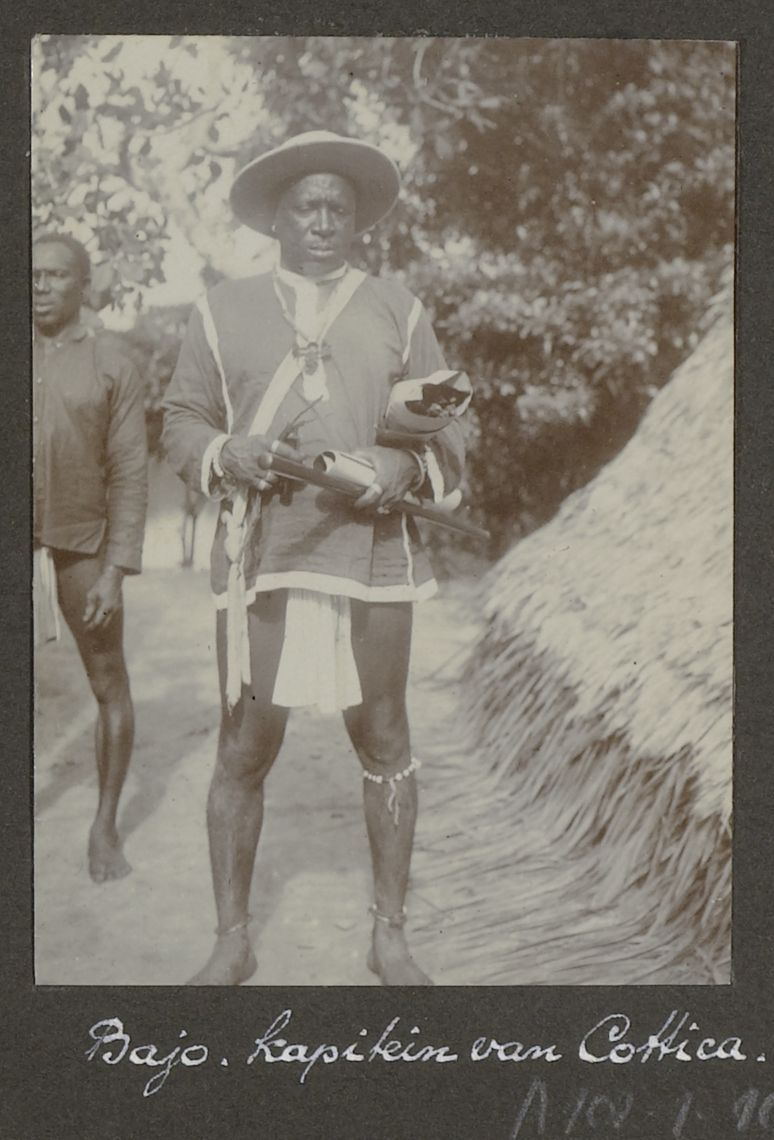
Captain Bayo (~1903)

During the 18th century, the Aluku people settled in Cottica. Boni became a major leader and conducted raids against Dutch plantations. Resulting intermittent warfare with Dutch militia, military and mercenaries, between 1768 and 1793, resulted in many Aluku seeking refuge in Papaïchton and other villages on the French side of the Marowijne River. On 25 May 1891, the Aluku people opted for French citizenship.

The village of Cottica was resettled in 1902, and is the only settlement in Suriname. The village is not under the authority of the granman of the Aluku. Captain Bayo, who was the chief at the time of the founding, asked permission from the Surinamese government to be officially installed. Op 21 April 1903, there was an official meeting with the Governor. Bayo insisted that his granman was Ochi of the Aluku and not granman Oseyse of the Ndyuka. This resulted in a stalemate which lasted until 1938 when Captain Nasinengee was officially installed as village chief.

The view from the village is dominated by the Cottica Mountain, which rises to a height of 744 metres (2441 feet).

== Bibliography ==
- Groot, Silvia, de (1970). "Rebellie der Zwarte Jagers. De nasleep van de Bonni-oorlogen 1788-1809". Digital Library of Dutch Literature. De Gids (in Dutch).
- Scholtens, Ben (1994). Bosneger and overheid in Suriname (Thesis) (in Dutch). Paramaribo: Radboud University Nijmegen. ISBN 9991410155.
