= Papaichton =

Commune in French Guiana, France

- Commune
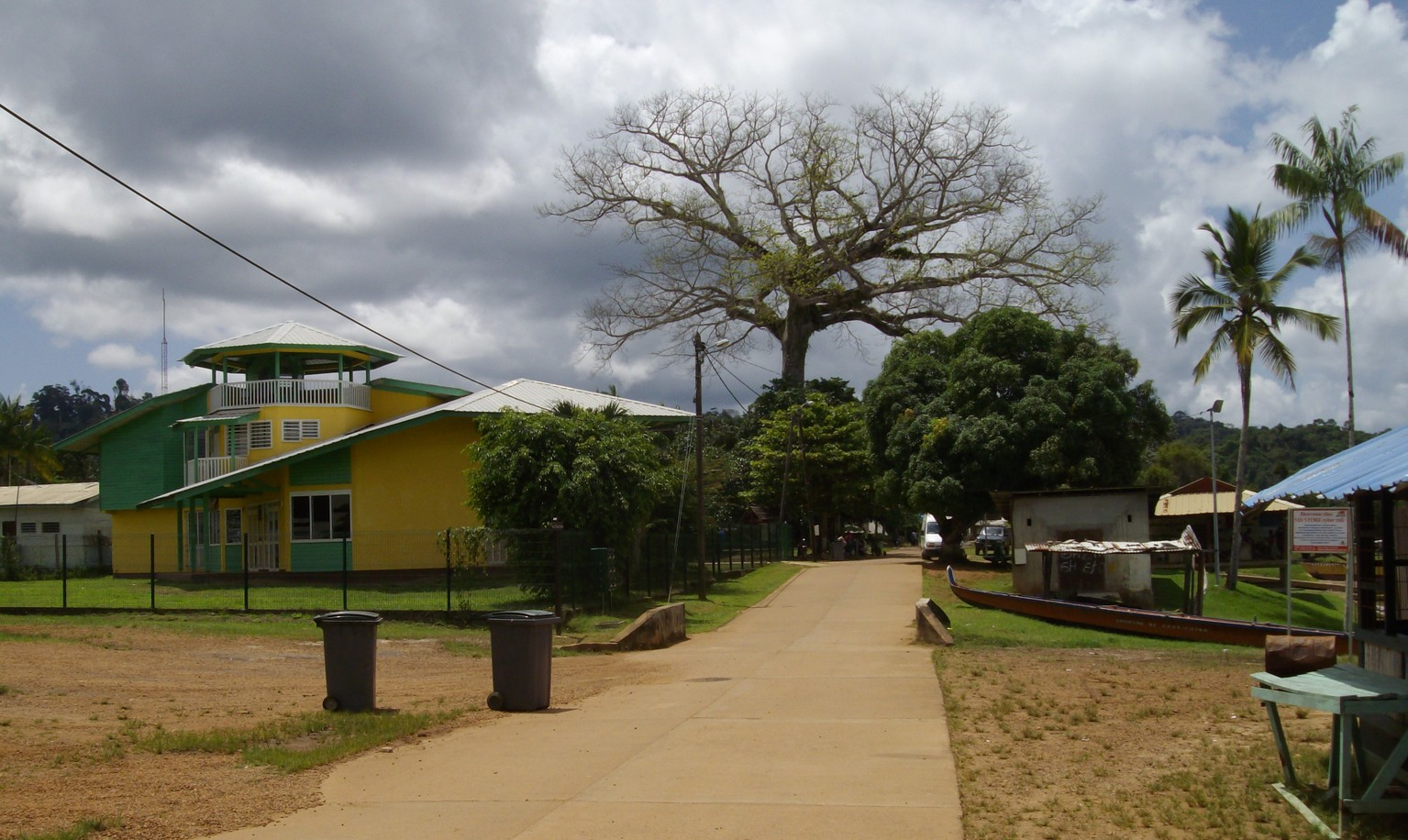
- A view of the Place de la Poste in the centre of Papaichton

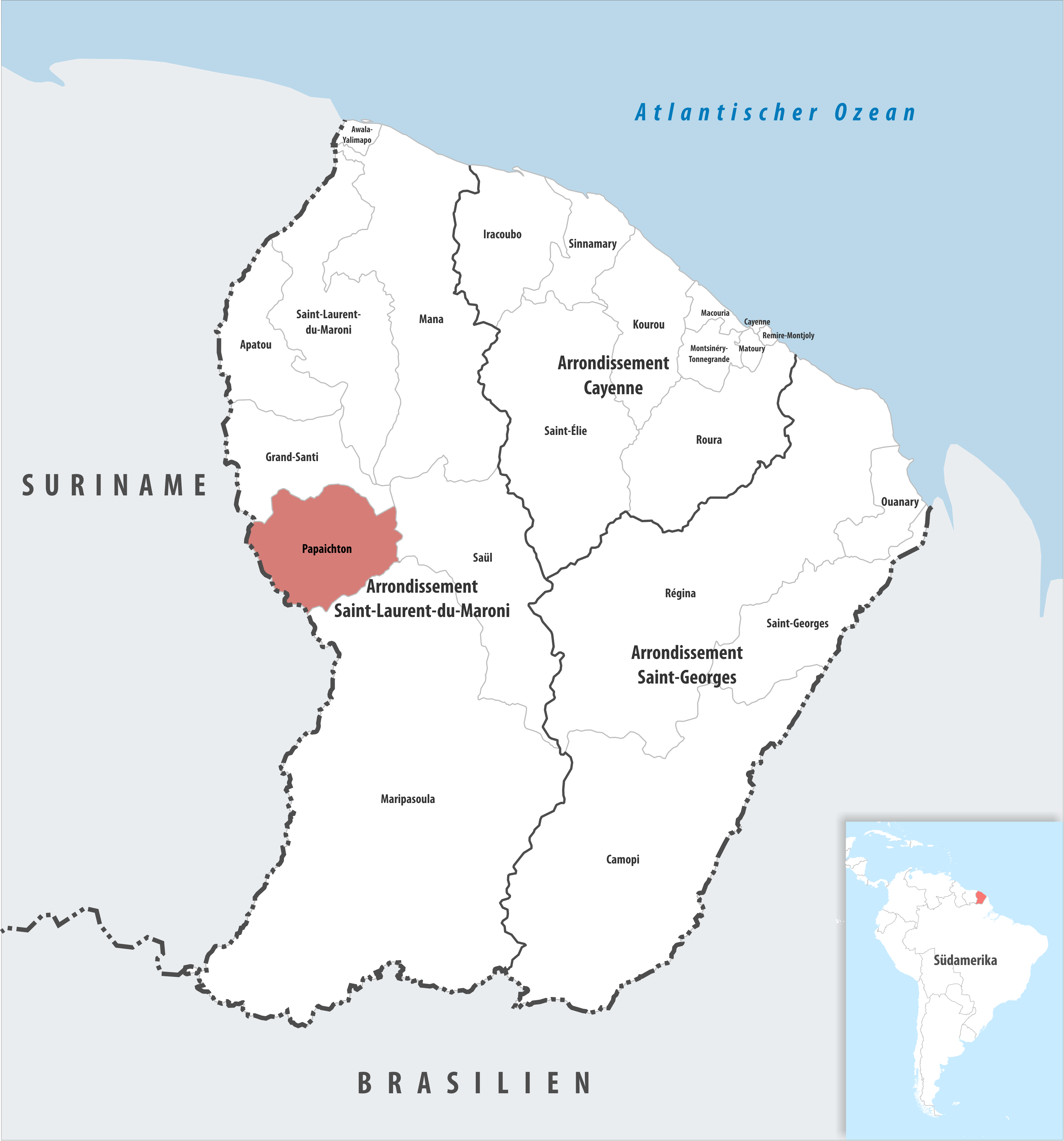
- Location of the commune (in red) within French Guiana
- Location of Papaichton
- Coordinates: 3°48′25″N 54°08′58″W
- Country: France
- Overseas region and department: French Guiana
- Arrondissement: Saint-Laurent-du-Maroni
- Intercommunality: Ouest Guyanais

Government
  - Mayor (2020–2026): Jules Deie
- Area^{1}: 2,628 km^{2} (1,015 sq mi)
- Population (2023): 5,006
  - Density: 1.905/km^{2} (4.934/sq mi)
- Time zone: UTC−03:00
- INSEE/Postal code: 97362 /97316
- ^{1} French Land Register data, which excludes lakes, ponds, glaciers > 1 km^{2} (0.386 sq mi or 247 acres) and river estuaries.

Papaichton (French pronunciation: [papajʃtɔ̃]; unofficial spelling Papaïchton with a trema; French Guianese Creole: Papaychton) is a commune in the overseas region and department of French Guiana. The village lies on the shores of the Lawa River. Papaichton is served by the Maripasoula Airport.

The village which is the seat of the commune was named Papaichton-Pompidouville in honour of the president Pompidou who invited Granman Tolinga to the Élysée in 1971. The commune is located on the border with Suriname.

Papaichton is home to some of the Aluku people and the seat of their granman (paramount chief).

== History ==
Around 1710, Slaves escape from the plantations in Suriname, and band together in tribes. A tribe calling itself Aluku settled in Cottica over the border in Suriname. In 1760, the Ndyuka, another Maroon tribe, signed a peace treaty with the Society of Suriname allowing them autonomy. Boni also desired a peace treaty, but the Society of Suriname, despite contrary advice from the Dutch government, wanted to persecute and destroy the Aluku. Between 1768 and 1793, the Boni wars started in which the Ndyuka side with the Dutch colonists, and it resulted in many Alukus seeking refuge in France on the other side of the Maroni River.

In 1895, the village was founded by Granman Ochi. At the time, Boniville was the capital of Aluku tribe. In 1930, the territory of Inini was founded, with Papaichton as one of the administrative divisions. The territory of Inini allowed for an autonomous and self sufficient tribal system for the Maroons without clear borders. In 1946, French Guiana departmentalised, and the territory of Inini became an arrondissement.

In 1965, Granman Tolinga moved the capital of the tribe from Boniville to Papaichton. In 1968, the municipal circle of Grand-Santi-Papaichton was created, and a year later became a commune. Along with the commune, came a government structure, and francisation. Most importantly, it led to the concentration in bigger villages and the near abandonment of smaller settlements. In 1976 the communes separated in Apatou and Grand-Santi-Papaichton, and finally in 1993, Papaichton became an independent commune.

== Population ==
Historical population
Year	Pop.	±% p.a.
1967	284	—
1974	410	+5.39%
1982	297	−3.95%
1990	750	+12.28%
1999	1,650	+9.16%
2007	2,296	+4.22%
2012	6,097	+21.57%
2017	6,668	+1.81%
2023	5,006	−4.67%
Source: INSEE

== Transport ==
Papaichton can only be accessed by air, or boat via the Maroni river. The unpaved path between Maripasoula and Papaichton will be turned into a proper road. Road work has commenced on 20 July 2020 and was scheduled to be completed by 2021. There are plans to extent the Route Nationale from Saint-Laurent-du-Maroni to Maripasoula, however the Route Nationale currently ends south of Apatou.

== Incident at Loka ==
Loka is a hamlet in the commune of Papaichton. In April 2006, 14 people from the same family, including 12 children, were found dead, believed to be the result of carbon monoxide poisoning.

== Nature ==
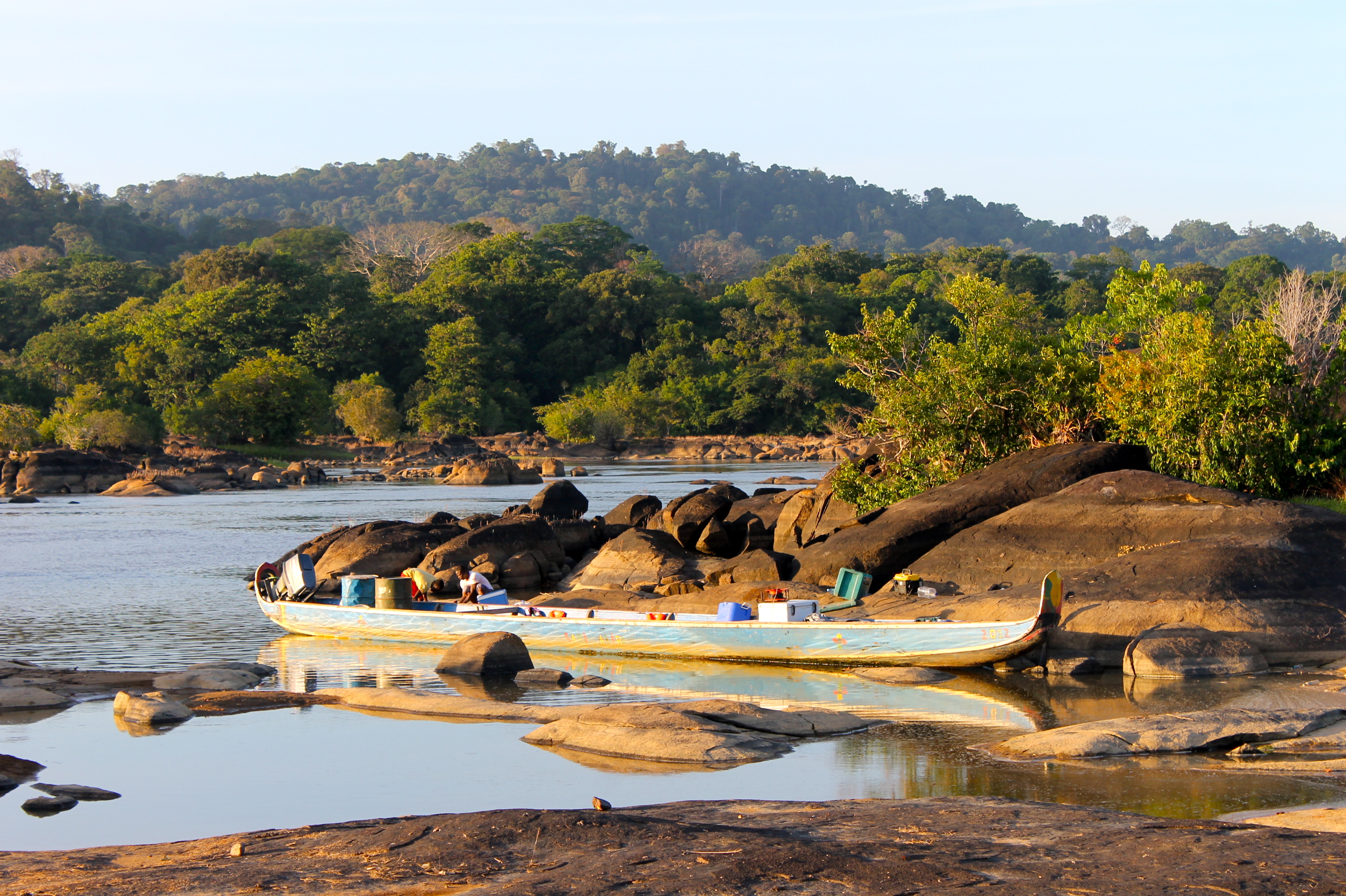
Abattis Cottica

The commune is dominated by the Cottica Mountain, which rises to a height of 744 metres. The mountain was ignored by scientists until 2005 when two naturalists started investigating the area, and discovered a remarkable biodiversity. In 2014, an area of 4,813 hectares (11,890 acres) was designated as ZNIEFF, an important natural environment.

The Lawa River narrows when it passes through the mountainous area around Cottica, and wild streams with waterfalls descend from the mountains through dense rainforest. The river widens to the north and splits in many streams with large river islands. The nature area around river is called Abattis Cottica.

== Villages ==
- Boniville
- Cormotibo

The commune is also home to several small hamlets which have a historic significance to the Aluku people. Between 1793 and 1837, the Aluku settled in Gaan Day (also: Gaa Daï; 4.02154°N 54.32157°W).

In 1860, a peace treaty was signed with the Ndyuka, and the Aluku were allowed to settle in the village of Abouna Sounga (also: Abunasunga; 4°3′34″N 54°21′38″W). The rapids of Abouna Sounga form the northern border of the Aluku area. The southern border is the Litani River.

L'Enfant Perdu (3.85785°N 54.21746°W) is a village on a river island across Cottica, Suriname. The Cottica mountain is located on the French side.

== Notable people ==
- Apatou (1833–1908), guide and captain (village chief)

== See also ==
- Communes of French Guiana
