= Lorquin =

- Commune
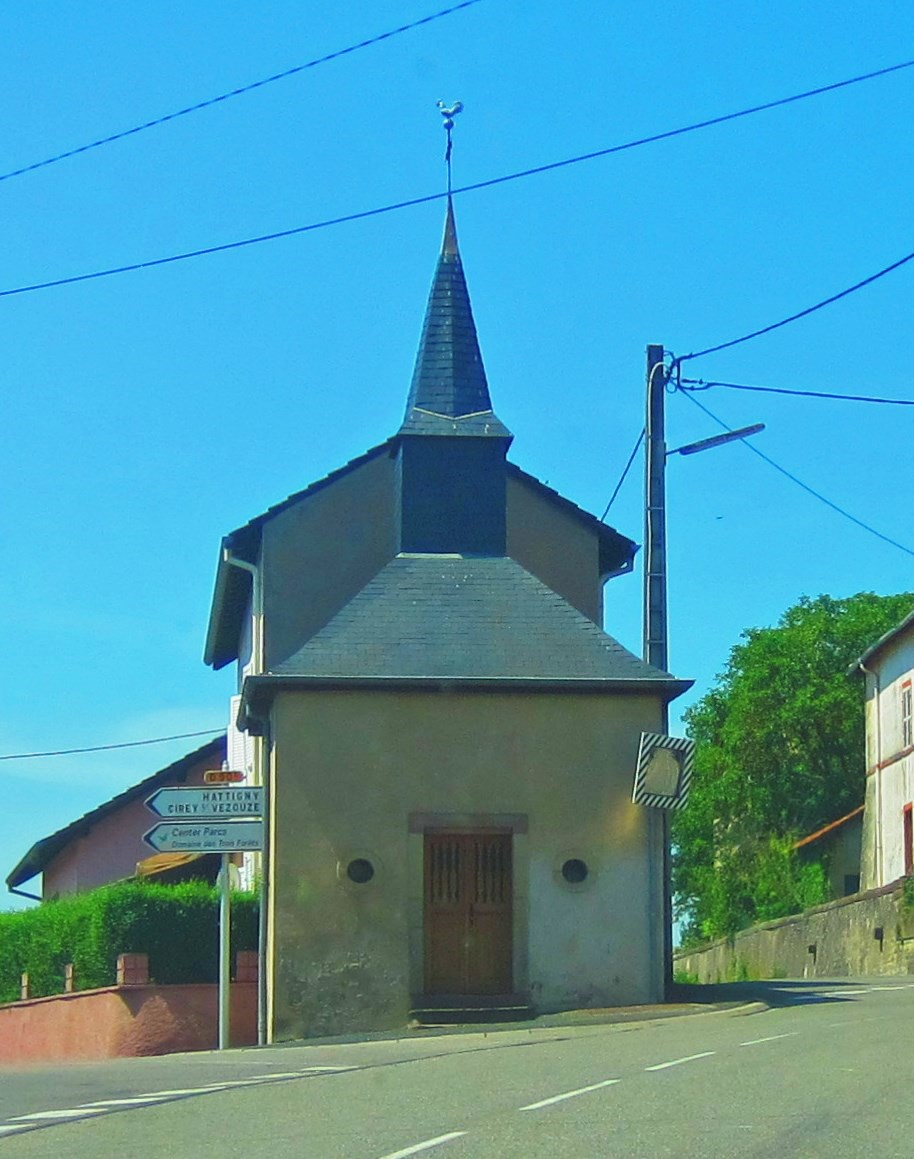
- The chapel in Lorquin

- Coat of arms
- Location of Lorquin
- Location within France Location within Grand Est
- Coordinates: 48°40′12″N 6°59′51″E
- Country: France
- Region: Grand Est
- Department: Moselle
- Arrondissement: Sarrebourg-Château-Salins
- Canton: Phalsbourg
- Intercommunality: Sarrebourg - Moselle Sud

Government
  - Mayor (2020–2026): Jean-Pierre Jully
- Area^{1}: 8.77 km^{2} (3.39 sq mi)
- Highest elevation: 341 m (1,119 ft)
- Lowest elevation: 260 m (850 ft)
- Population (2023): 1,150
  - Density: 131/km^{2} (340/sq mi)
- Time zone: UTC+01:00 (CET)
  - Summer (DST): UTC+02:00 (CEST)
- INSEE/Postal code: 57414 /57790
- ^{1} French Land Register data, which excludes lakes, ponds, glaciers > 1 km^{2} (0.386 sq mi or 247 acres) and river estuaries.

Lorquin (French pronunciation: [lɔʁkɛ̃]; German: Lörchingen; Lorraine Franconian: Lëëschinge) is a commune in the Moselle department in Grand Est in north-eastern France.

== See also ==
- Communes of the Moselle department
