= Litani (Maroni tributary) =

River in Suriname and French Guiana

Litani Itany
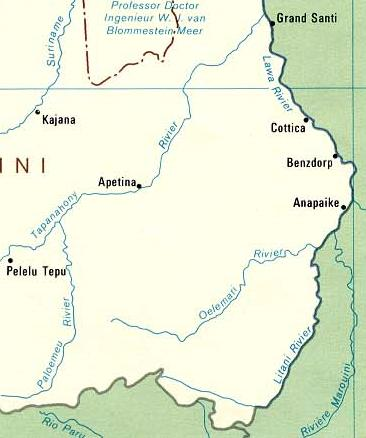
- Litani River

Location
- Countries: Suriname and French Guiana

Physical characteristics
- Source
  - coordinates: 2.5314°N 54.8646°W
- Mouth: Lawa
  - coordinates: 3.2997°N 54.0662°W

Basin features
- Progression: Lawa→ Maroni→ Atlantic Ocean

The Litani or Itany is a river which forms part of the boundary between Suriname and French Guiana. It is a tributary, or the upper course, of the Maroni. The boundary is disputed, with Suriname also claiming land to the east of the river.

The Litani river flows in the Lawa near Antécume-Pata, and is fed from the Loë and Ulemari creeks. The river was first explored in 1950 by A. Franssen Herderschee into the Tumuk Humak Mountains. The total length of Litani, Lawa and Maroni is 612 km (380 mi).

== See also ==
- Borders of Suriname
