= Tumuk Humak Mountains =

Mountain range in South America

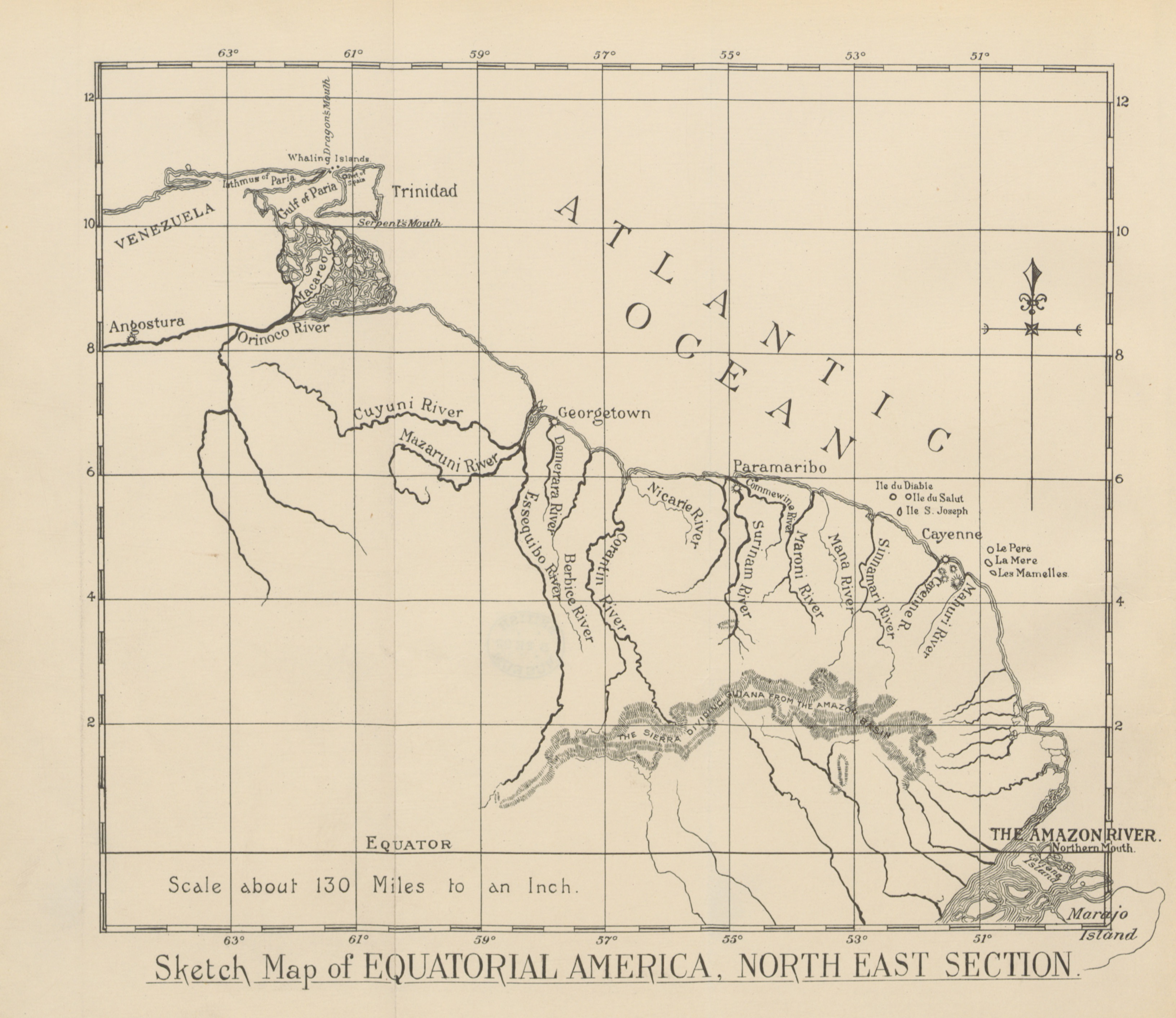
- Tumuk Humak Mountains on a map of 1891, described only as "The sierra dividing Guiana from the Amazon Basin".

Highest point
- Elevation: 956 m (3,136 ft)
- Coordinates: 2°20′N 55°0′W

Geography
- Location within Brazil
- Countries: Brazil, French Guiana and Suriname

The Tumuk Humak Mountains (Dutch: Toemoek-Hoemakgebergte, Portuguese: Serra do Tumucumaque, French: Monts Tumuc Humac) are a mountain range in South America, stretching about 120 kilometers (75 mi) east–west in the border area between Brazil in the south and Suriname and French Guiana in the north. In the language of the Apalam and Wayana peoples, Tumucumaque means "the mountain rock symbolizing the struggle between the shaman and the spirits". The range is very remote and almost inaccessible.

Both the Maroni and Oyapock rivers rise in the Tumuk Humak Mountains. The Maroni (Dutch: Marowijne) forms the entire (disputed) border between Suriname and French Guiana, and the Oyapock (Portuguese: Oiapoque) most of the border between French Guiana and Brazil.

The Tumuk Humak Mountains are part of the Tumucumaque Uplands of the Guiana Shield. They are geographically important because they form the divide between the biogeographical system of the Amazon Basin and that of the Atlantic coastal area of the Guianas. The Tumuk Humak plateau is covered primarily with lowland and plateau forests.

Brazil's Tumucumaque Mountains National Park is named after the Tumuk Humak Mountains and covers that country's section of the mountain range, in the states of Pará and Amapá. Created in 2002, it is Brazil's largest national park and the world's largest protected tropical forest. The highest point in the state of Amapá is located there, reaching 701 meters (2,300 ft).

The French film Tumuc Humac (1970), directed by Jean-Marie Périer, was named after the mountain range.

== Named points ==
- Knopaiamoi

== Sources ==
- Bruijning, CFA en J. Voorhoeve (eds.): Encyclopedie van Suriname. Amsterdam and Brussels 1977
- The Guiana Shield Initiative
