= Maroni (river) =

River in South America, forming the border between Suriname and French Guiana

Maroni Marowijne
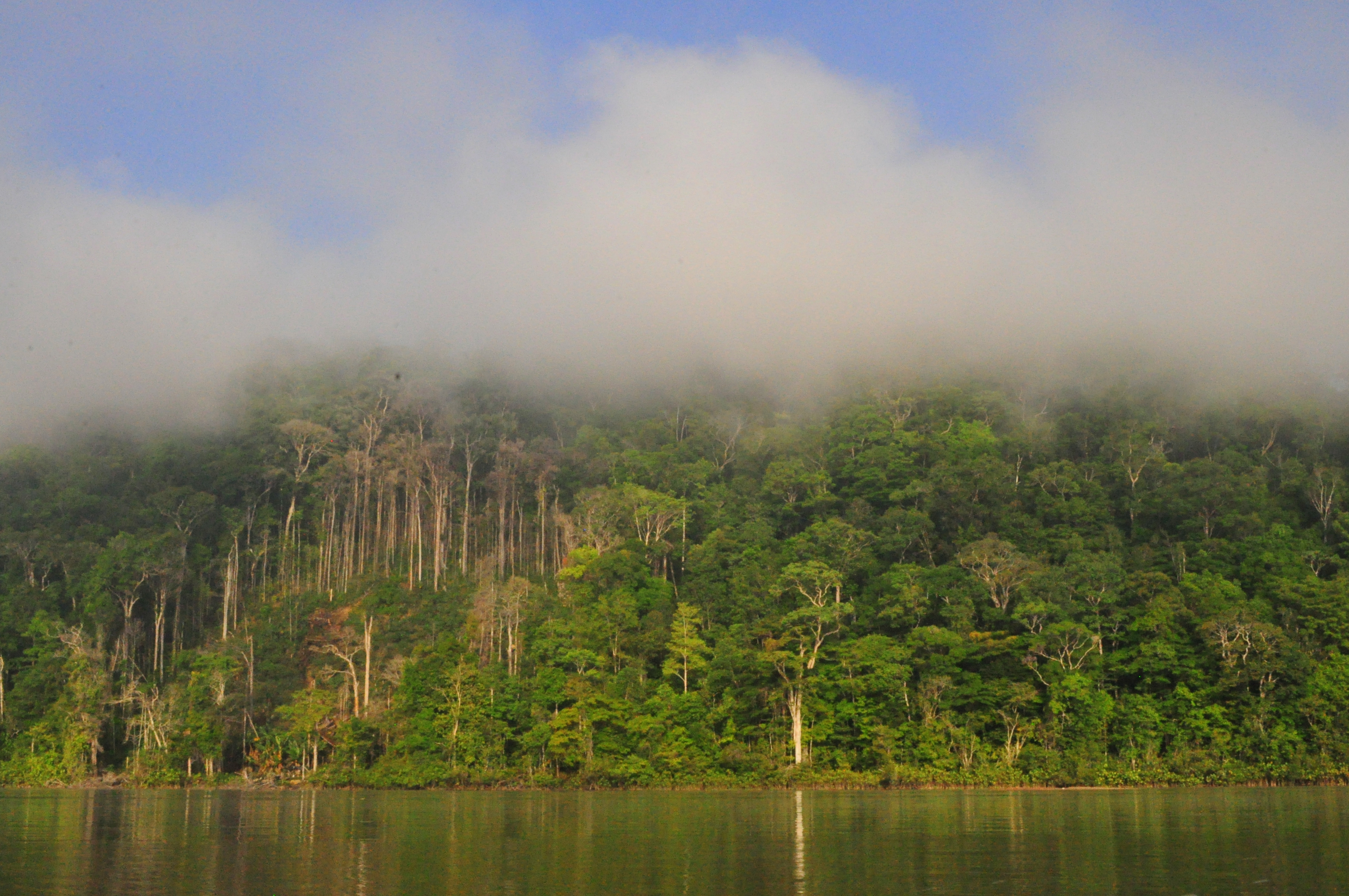

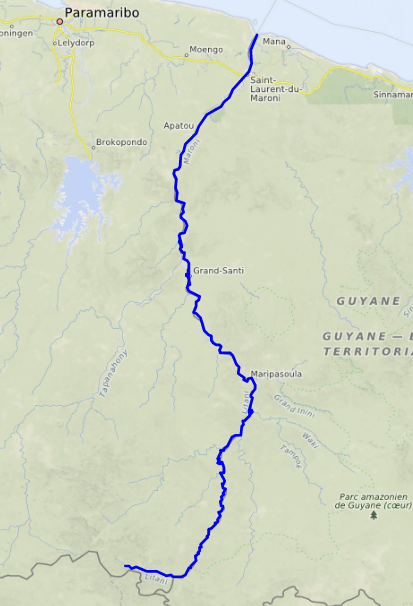
- Course of the Maroni
- Native name: Marwina-Liba (Sranan Tongo)

Location
- Countries: France and Suriname
- Cities: Albina (Suriname); Saint-Laurent-du-Maroni (France)

Physical characteristics
- Source
  - location: Suriname
  - coordinates: 2°N 54°W
- Mouth: Atlantic Ocean
  - coordinates: 5°44′45″N 53°58′06″W
  - elevation: 0 m (0 ft)
- Length: 611.7 km (380.1 mi)
- Basin size: 65,830 km^{2} (25,420 sq mi)
- Discharge
  - average: 1,700 m^{3}/s (60,000 cu ft/s) 2,586 m^{3}/s (91,300 cu ft/s)

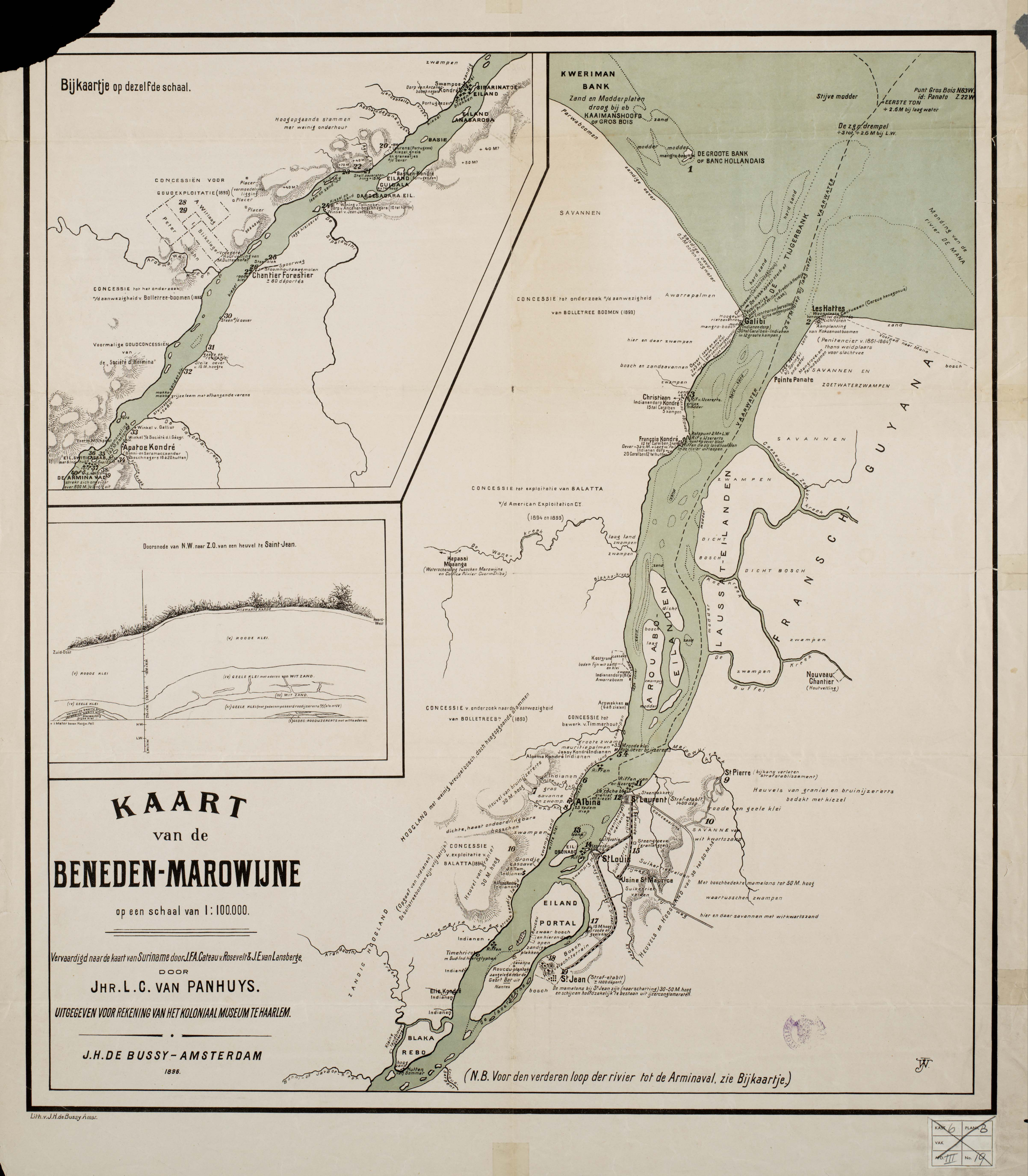
Map of the Maroni River from 1896

The Maroni (French: [maʁɔni]) or Marowijne (Dutch: [maːroːˈʋɛinə]; Sranan Tongo: Marwina-Liba) is a river in South America that forms the border between French Guiana and Suriname.

== Course ==
The Maroni runs through the Guianan moist forests ecoregion. It originates in the Tumuk Humak Mountains and forms the (disputed) border between France (region of French Guiana) and Suriname. In its upper reaches, it is also known as the Lawa, and close to its source it is known as the Litani. The total length of Litani, Lawa and Maroni is 612 km (380 mi).

There are two nature preserves located in the estuary region on the Surinamese side of the river, near the village of Galibi. They provide protection for the birds and the leatherback sea turtles that hatch there.

== Territorial dispute ==
In 1860, the question was posed from the French side, which of the two tributary rivers was the headwater, and thus the border. A joint French-Dutch commission was appointed to review the issue. The Dutch side of the commission consisted of J.H. Baron van Heerdt tot Eversberg, J.F.A. Cateau van Rosevelt and August Kappler. Luits Vidal, Ronmy, Boudet and Dr. Rech composed the French side. In 1861 measurements were taken, which produced the following result: the Lawa had a discharge of 35,960 m^{3}/minute at a width of 436 m; the Tapanahony had a discharge of 20,291 m^{3}/minute at a width of 285 m. Thus, the Lawa River was the headwater of the Maroni River.

There were no problems with this decision until 1885. However, the discovery of gold in the area between the Lawa and the Tapanahony created a new border conflict. On 29 November 1888, France and the Netherlands reached an agreement that the conflict should be subject to arbitration. Czar Alexander III of Russia, acting as the arbitrator, decided that the Lawa was the headwater of the Maroni, and thus should be considered the border.

However, this decision created another issue as to which river is the source of the Lawa. The Netherlands considered the Malani (Marowijnekreek in Dutch) to be the source of the Lawa; the French considered the Litani, located further to the west, to be the source of the Lawa. This issue has still not been resolved.

The Litani originates in the Tumuk Humak Mountains at approximately 2 1/2° N 55° W; along its path it is fed by Koele Koelebreek, the Lokereek, the Mapaonikreek and the Oelemari River.

The Malani also has its source in the Tumuk Humak Mountains, at approximately 2° N, 54° W; it also absorbs the Koelebreek, among others.

== Numbers ==
The Maroni basin is 68,700 km^{2}; above the island Langatabbetje (110 km away from the mouth of the river) this area is 63,700 km^{2}. Between 1952 and 1973, the average discharge near Langatabbetje was about 1,700 m^{3}/second. The minimum was 95 m^{3}/second, the maximum 6,550 m^{3}/second. The estuary is approximately 90 km long; the average tidal range in the estuary is 2 m; in the dry season, the salt reaches about 40 km upstream to the town of Albina.

The estimated potential hydro power for Suriname is between 1150 and 1250 megawatts.

== Exploration ==
The Maroni is the most extensively studied of all the rivers in Suriname. In the 16th century, there were already ships exploring the estuary, by Lawrence Keymis, Thomas Masham, Antonio de Berrio and Adriaen Cabeliau and in the 17th century, by Harcourt, Fisher and De Vries. In the 18th century, more extensive excursions took place by Mentell, Patris, Le Blond and Heneman. In the 19th century, further excursions were made by Zegelaar, Jules Crevaux, Coudreau, Ten Kate, Joost and others.

Of importance in the 20th century were the Gonini and Tapanahony expeditions, and the Tumuk Humak and Southern Border Expeditions. From these arose the research of the Geologisch Mijnbouwkundige Dienst (GMD) and the Centraal Bureau voor Luchtkartering (CBL).

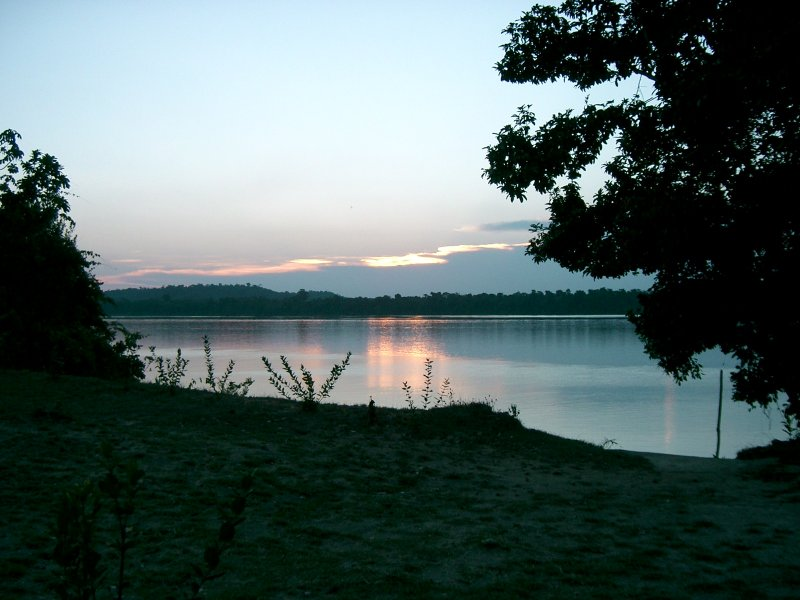
Sunrise over the Maroni River

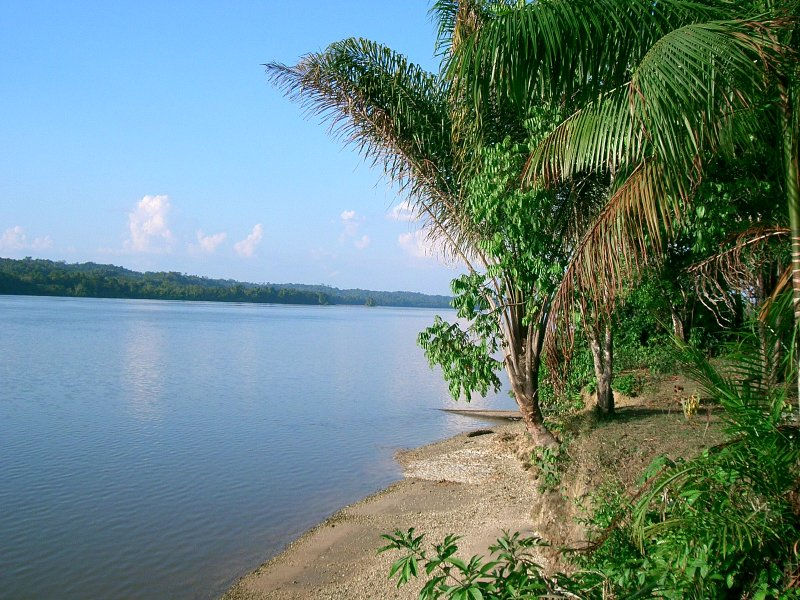
Maroni River, view from French Guiana to Suriname
