= Mont Itoupé =

Mountain in French Guiana

- Sommet Tabulaire
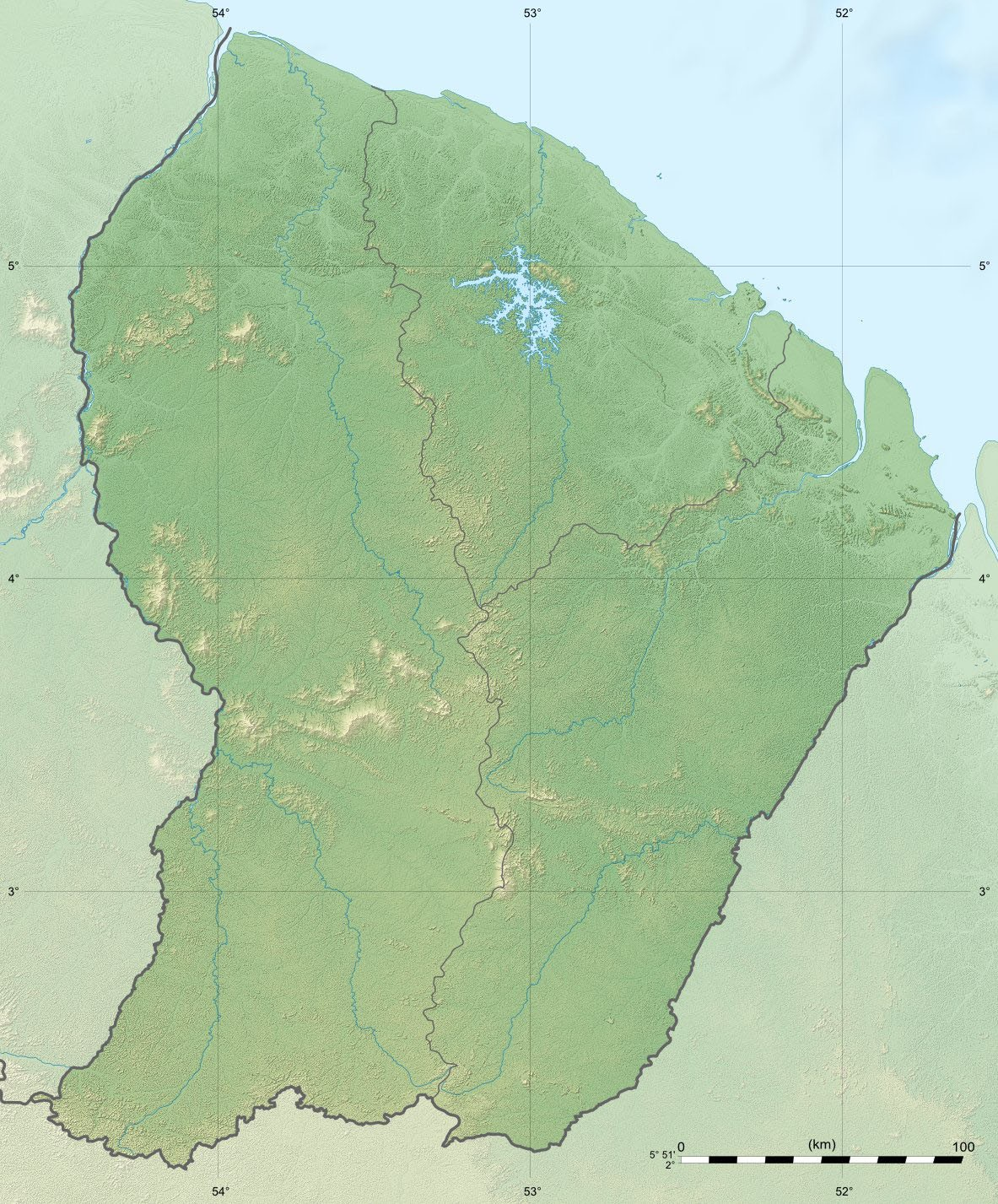
- Location within French Guiana

Highest point
- Elevation: 826 m (2,710 ft)
- Prominence: 637 m (2,090 ft)
- Coordinates: 3.02278°N 53.08387°W

Geography
- Location: Camopi/Maripasoula, French Guiana

Mont Itoupé (also Sommet Tabulaire) is an 826-metre high (2,710 ft) mountain on the border of the Camopi and Maripasoula communes in French Guiana, France. It is the second highest mountain in French Guiana after Bellevue de l'Inini. The mountain is located in the Guiana Amazonian Park, and is about 80 kilometres (50 mi) south of Saül.

== Overview ==
Mont Itoupé is a mountain covered in cloud forests. Often the top of the mountain is literally covered in clouds. To the west of the mountain are the Waki Plains, a vast nearly unexplored land. To the south is a Teko trail which links the Maroni to the Oyapock river. Even though the mountain stands in a very remote area, some trees bear witness to the Balatá harvesting of the late 19th century.

There is a remarkable difference between the eastern and western slope of the mountain. The eastern slope has an open canopy with dense undergrowth, while on the western side the undergrowth is less dense or even absent and contains endemic species in the canopy.

More than 130 plant species have been identified including the rare Chamaecostus curcumoides, and Pitcairnia sastrei. As of 2014, around twenty plant species new to science and not yet described have been discovered around the mountain.
