= Bienvenue, French Guiana =

Abandoned village and gold mine

Bienvenue
- Abandoned village and gold mine
- Location in French Guiana
- Coordinates: 3°7′N 52°41′W
- Country: France
- Overseas region: French Guiana
- Arrondissement: Cayenne
- Commune: Camopi

Population (1950)
  - Total: 0

Bienvenue was a village in southeastern French Guiana in the Camopi commune, and is located where the Alicorne Creek flows into the river Camopi. The village used to be inhabited by the Wayampi tribe. It is located in a protected zone (ZNIFF). The village was abandoned in 1950. In 1953, the village was listed as near the site of a gold mine.
