= Trois Sauts =

Trois Sauts Ɨtu wasu
- Cluster of villages
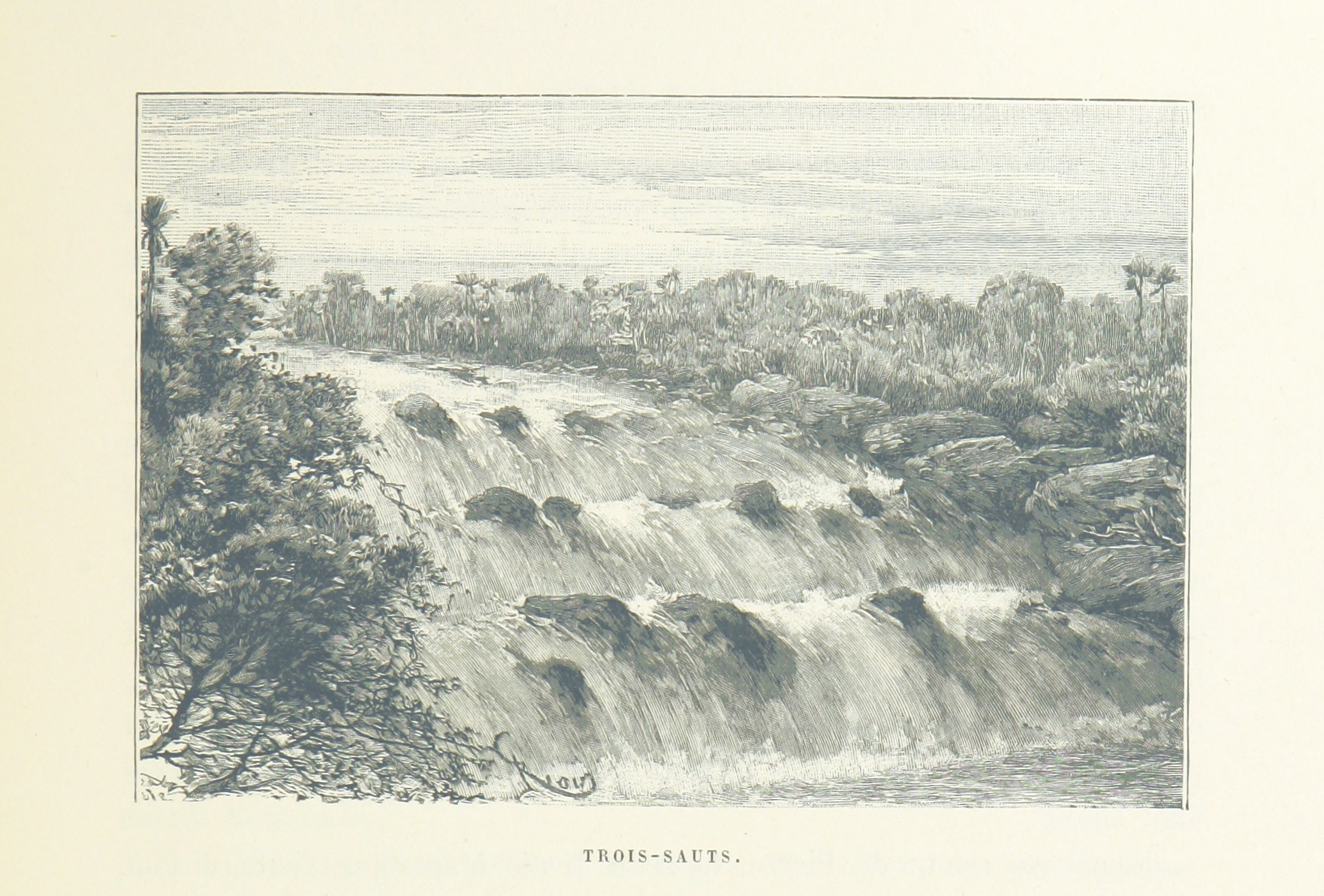
- Drawing of the Trois Sauts waterfalls (1893)

- Location in French Guiana
- Coordinates: 2.24589°N 52.87343°W
- Country: France
- Overseas region: French Guiana
- Arrondissement: Saint-Georges
- Commune: Camopi

Government
  - Chief: Jacky Pawey
- Elevation: 138 m (453 ft)

Population (2012)
  - Total: c. 590
- Time zone: UTC-3

Trois Sauts (English: three waterfalls) or Ɨtu wasu is a cluster of four Amerindian Wayampi and Teko villages on the Oyapock River in French Guiana near the border with Brazil. Trois Sauts contains the villages of Roger, Zidock (also Zidok), Yawapa, and Pina.

== History ==
Trois Sauts has been established in the 1950s, and named after a waterfall near the source of river. The name was a mistranslation, because the waterfall has four levels making it impossible to pass by boat, and thus isolating the upstream area in Brazil from the downstream in French Guiana. The people living in Trois Sauts came from the upstream areas. It was not until 1969, that the villages of Roger and Zidock were established. As of 2012, the villages are in a sustainable local development area of the Guiana Amazonian Park and has a park office.

Even though Trois Sault is an isolated community and far from the gold fields of Camopi, the population of the villages had the highest contamination with mercury, because they live on cassave, hunting and fishing without access to supermarkets.

== Overview ==
Trois Sauts has a school, a clinic, and since 2013, an annex of the commune. In 2020, a hydroelectric power plant in the waterfall was completed in order to provide electricity for the villages.

== Transport ==
The villages can only be reached via the river. It is located two days by boat from Saint-Georges or one day from Camopi. The villages may only be accessed with a special permit from the Prefecture.

== Bibliography ==
- Grenand, Pierre; Grenand, Françoise Grenand (2017). "Pour une histoire de la cartographie des territoires teko et wayãpi (Commune de Camopi, Guyane française)". Open Edition. Revue d’ethnoécologie (in French) (11). doi:10.4000/ethnoecologie.3007.
