= Bienvenu =

Bienvenu is the name of:

== Surname ==
- Alberto Bienvenu (1916–2004), Mexican basketball player
- Bernard Bienvenu (1920–1993), French footballer
- Henri Bienvenu (born 1988), Cameroonian footballer
- Léon Bienvenu (1835–1910), French journalist and writer

== Given name ==
- Bienvenu de Miollis (1753–1843), Bishop of Digne
- Bienvenu Eva Nga (born 1993), Cameroonian footballer
- Bienvenu Mbida, Congolese judoka
- Bienvenu Sawadogo (born 1995), Burkinabé sprinter

== See also ==
- Bienvenue (disambiguation)
