= Guiana Amazonian Park =

French national park in French Guiana

Parc amazonien de Guyane
- Guiana Amazonian Park
- IUCN category II (national park)
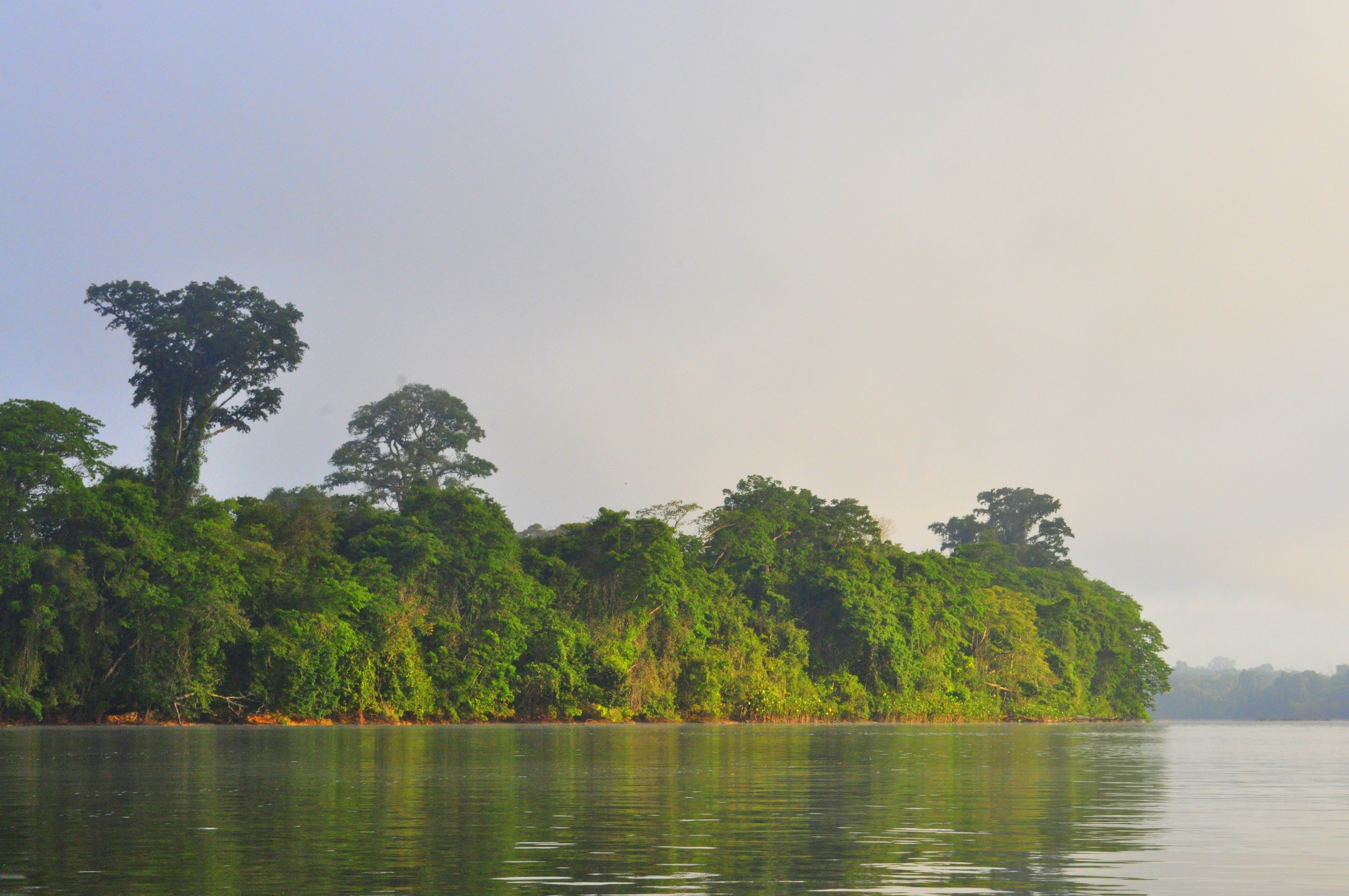
- View from the Maroni River

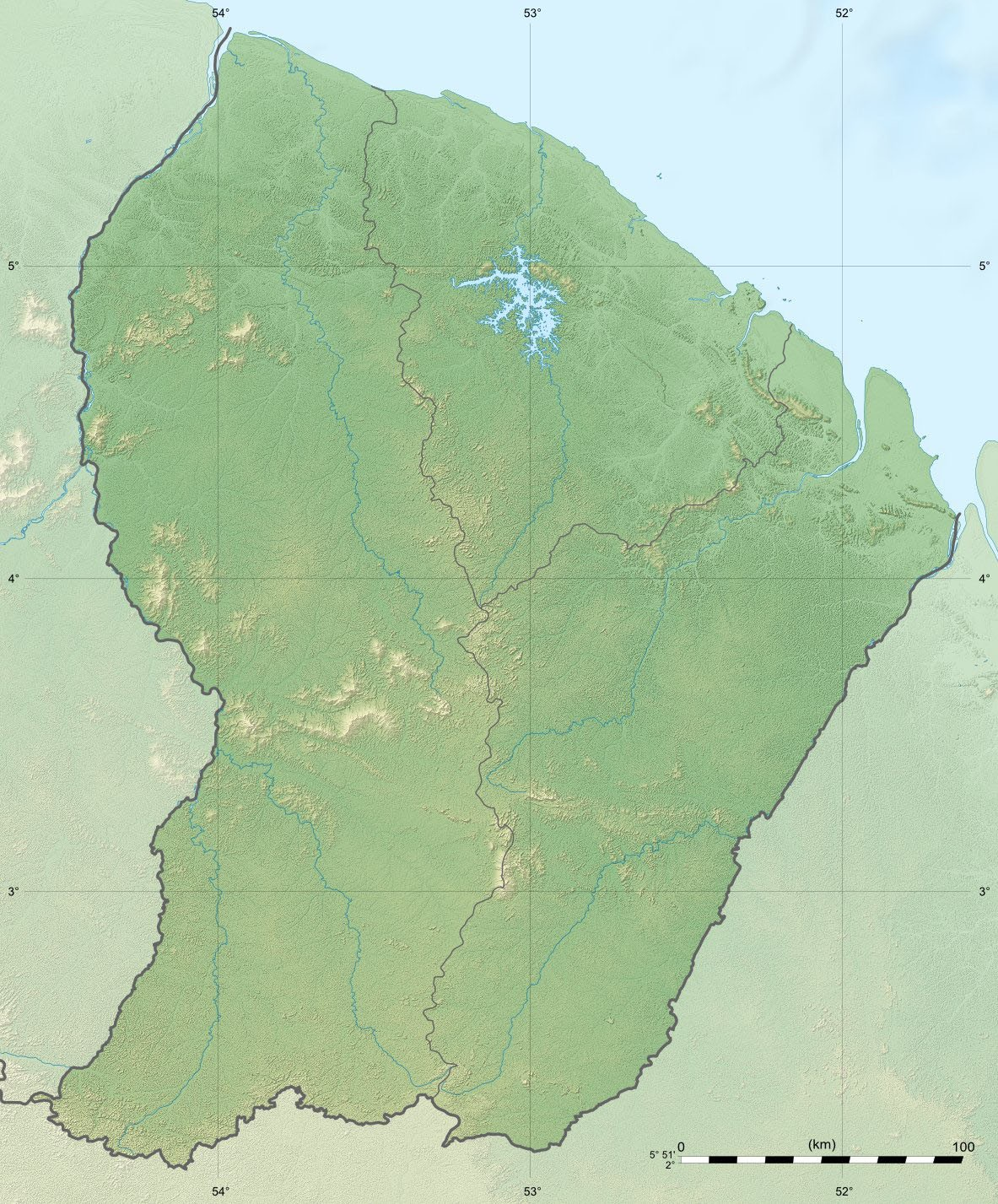
- Location within French Guiana
- Nearest city: Maripasoula
- Coordinates: 2°50′18″N 53°46′20″W
- Area: 20,300 km^{2} (7,838 sq mi)
- Established: February 27, 2007
- Governing body: French Office for Biodiversity
- Website: Parc-Amazonien-Guyane.fr

Guiana Amazonian Park (French: Parc amazonien de Guyane) is the largest national park of France, aiming at protecting part of the Amazonian forest located in French Guiana which covers 41% of the region. It is the largest park in France as well as the largest park in the European Union and one of the largest national parks in the world.

It cannot be accessed from the seashore or by any means other than airplane or pirogue via the Maroni and Oyapock rivers.

The protected area covers some 20,300 square kilometres (7,840 sq mi) for the central area (where full protection is enforced) and 13,600 square kilometres (5,250 sq mi) for the secondary area. Thus, the overall protected area represents some 33,900 square kilometres (13,090 sq mi) of rain forest.

The park has been built on territories belonging to the communes of Camopi, Maripasoula, Papaïchton, Saint-Élie, and Saül.

Like other Parcs nationaux de France, the park is overseen by the French Office for Biodiversity.

== History ==
In the framework of the Earth summit in Rio de Janeiro in 1992, the project of a national park in French Guiana was initiated on June 4, 1992, with the impetus provided by François Mitterrand. This was formalised through a draft agreement signed by the presidents of the general council and of the regional council of French Guiana, and also by the French Ministers of the Environment, of the Overseas Departments and Territories and of Agriculture and Forestry. Following this, in 1993 the Mission for the Creation of the French Guiana National Park was created.

A first project was proposed in late 1995 but was finally rejected in December 1997.

On June 21, 1998, the Twenké agreement led to the recognition of the rights of the native Amerindians and of the Businengue (Maroons) living within the future park's boundaries.

The final project was presented in early 2006. On March 6, 2006, the decree relating to the project of the national park being taken into account was published in the Official Journal of the French Republic. Within it, the national park's name was switched to Guiana Amazonian Park.

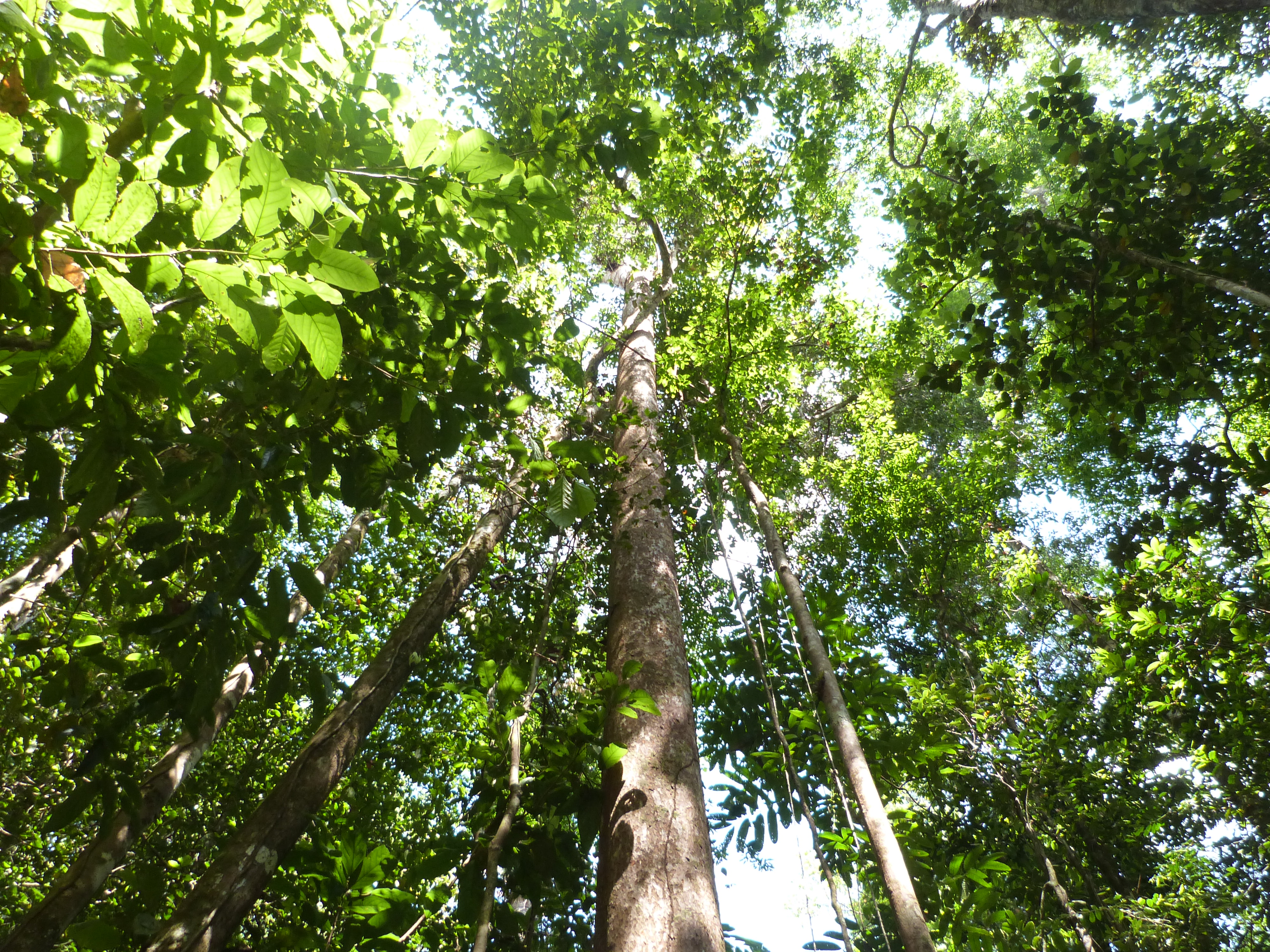
Forest canopy

The creation of the park was made effective by decree on February 28, 2007, despite the reluctance of several protagonists involved (general council and regional council of French Guiana). The park's governing body met for the first time on June 7, 2007.

== Extent ==
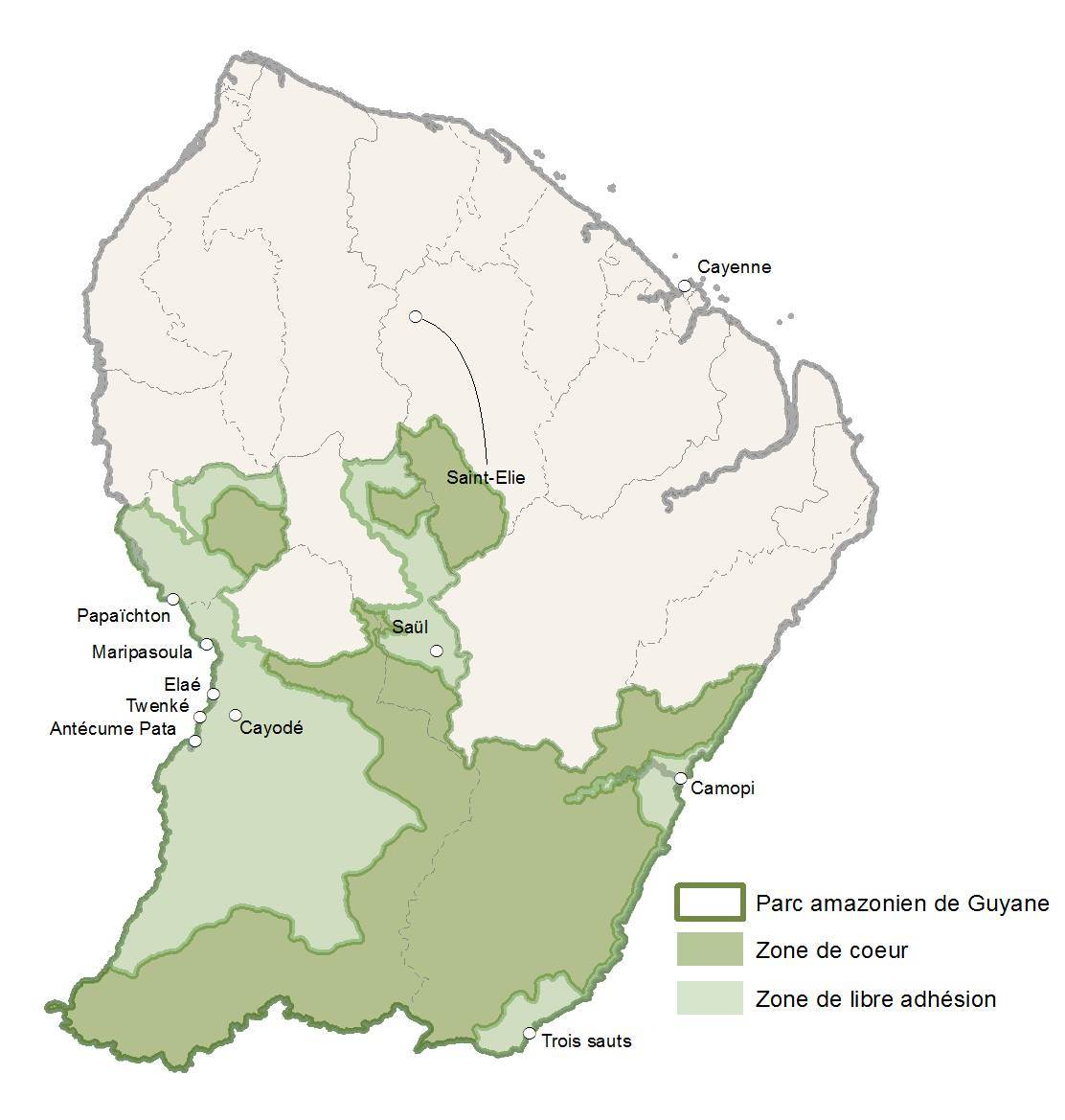
Extent of the park

Within the 20,300 square kilometres (7,840 sq mi) central area, maximal protection is enforced and gold mining is strictly forbidden. However, the lands of the Aluku, Wayana, Wayampi and Teko tribes in Camopi, Maripasoula and Papaïchton do not belong to this core area. The Teko considered it a restriction of their free movement, and the Aluku objected to restrictions to their sacred areas. The restriction of all previously acquired rights of the tribal inhabitants resulted the exception of the inhabited tribal zone.

Put together with Tumucumaque National Park (covering some 38,800 square kilometres (14,980 sq mi) in neighbouring Brazil), the Guiana Amazonian Park represents the biggest rain forest protected area in the world.

== Fauna ==
In the park there are 90 species of amphibians, 133 reptiles, 520 birds and 182 mammals (including many species of bats) and more than 200 species of freshwater fish

=== Mammals ===
==== New World Primates ====
The park includes several new world primates including the Guyanan red howler (Alouatta macconnelli), wedge-capped capuchin (Cebus olivaceus), tufted capuchin (Sapajus apella), white-faced saki (Pithecia pithecia), golden-handed tamarin (Saguinus midas), and red-faced spider monkey (Ateles paniscus).

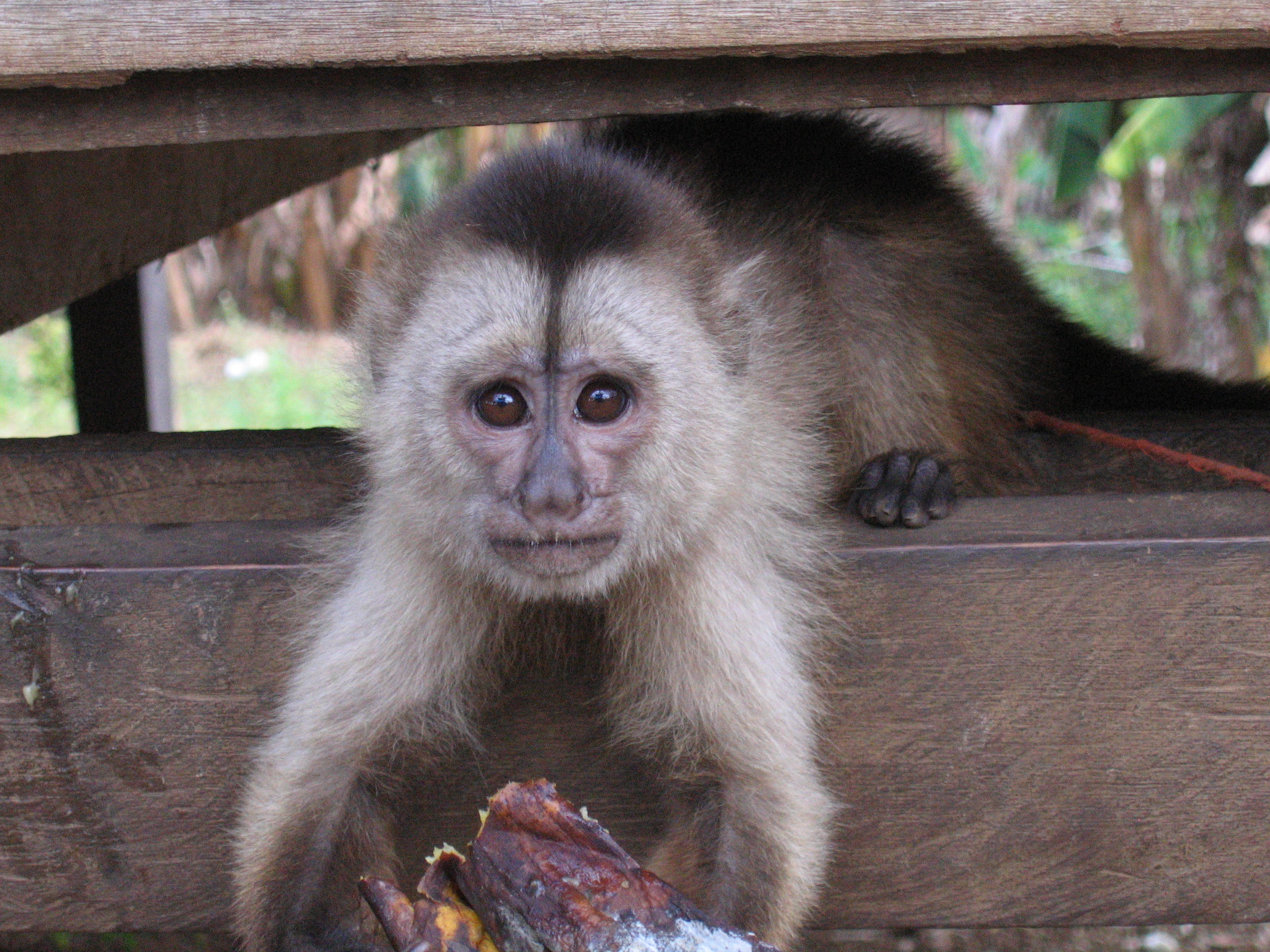
Wedge-capped capuchin

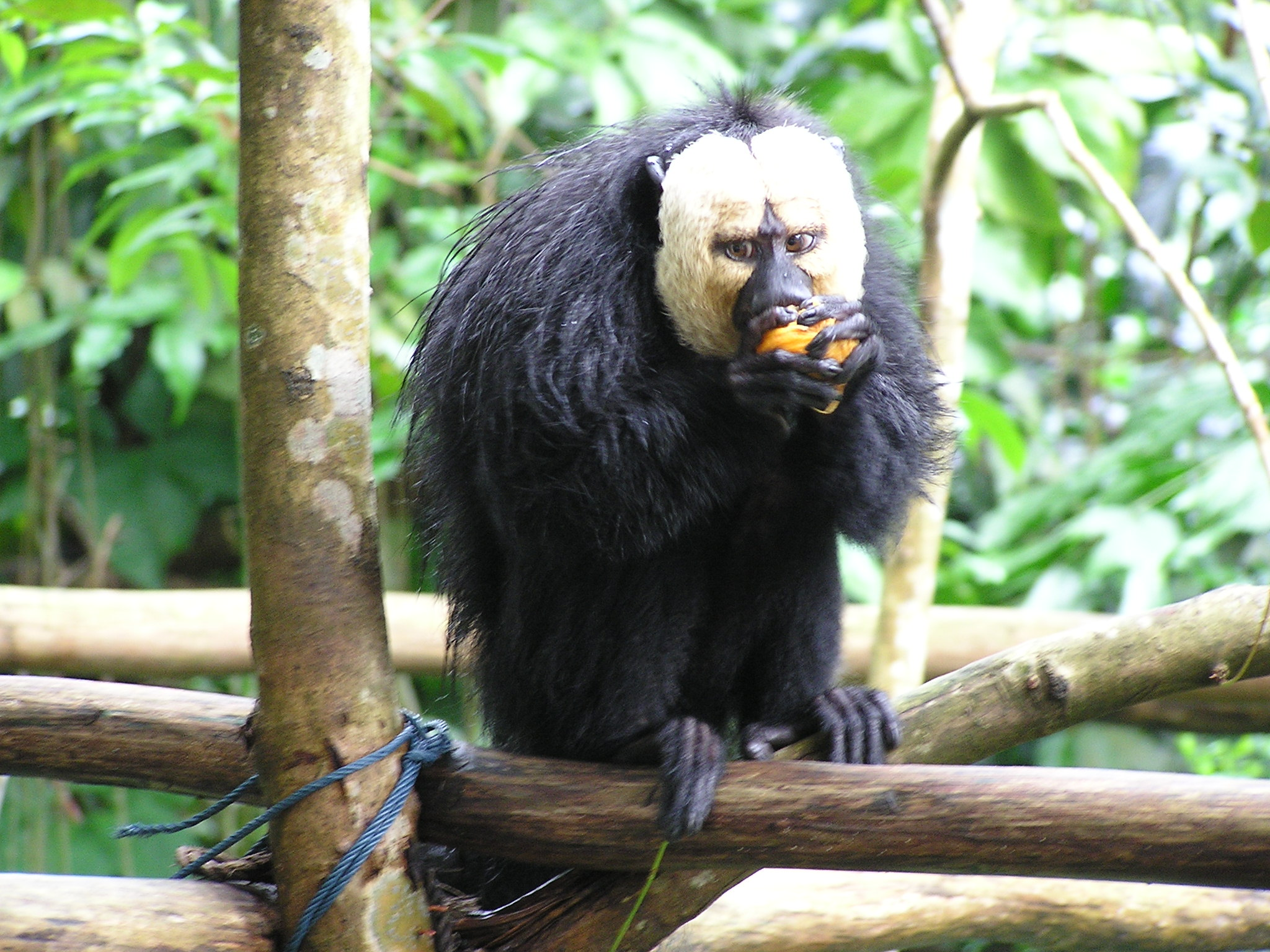
white-faced saki

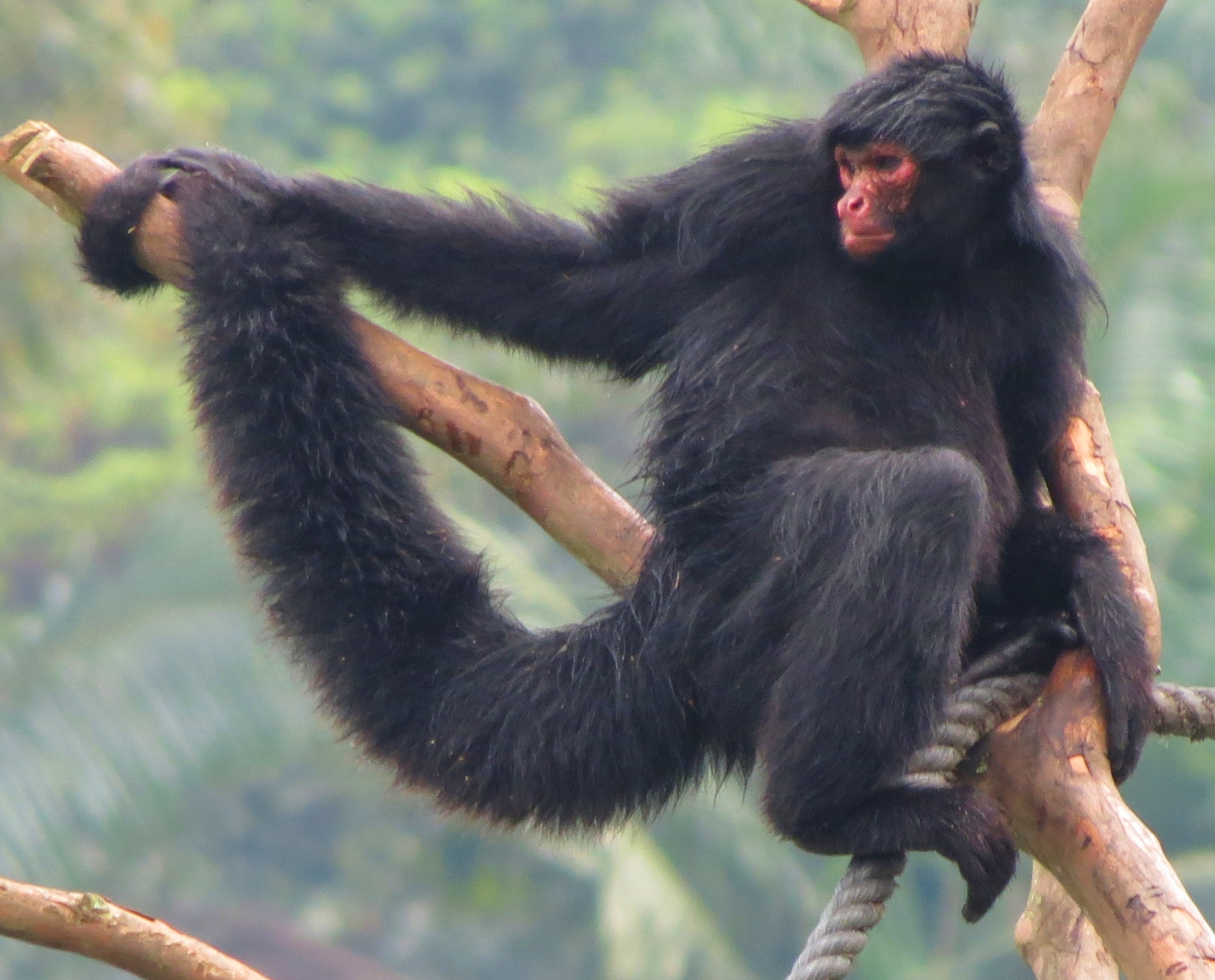
red faced spider monkey

==== Possums ====
Possum species include the bare-tailed woolly opossum (caluromys philander), Guianan white-eared opossum (didelphis imperfecta). common opossum (didelphis marsupialis), woolly mouse opossum (marmosa demerarae). Linnaeus's mouse opossum (marmosa murina), delicate slender opossum (marmosops parvidens), Pinheiro's slender opossum (marmosops pinheiroi), brown four-eyed opossum (metachirus nudicaudatus), Touan short-tailed opossum (monodelphis touan), Gray four-eyed opossum (philander opossum). The water opossum (chironectes minimus), bushy-tailed opossum (glironia cf. venusta), Kalinowski's mouse opossum (Hyladelphys kalinowskii), and Rufous mouse opossum (Marmosa lepida) have been found but are rare or have unknown numbers.

==== Cats and Canines ====
Many cat and canine species are found in the park including the ocelot (Leopardus pardalis), margay (Leopardus wiedii), jaguarundi (Herpailurus yagouaroundi), and bush dog (Speothos venaticus).

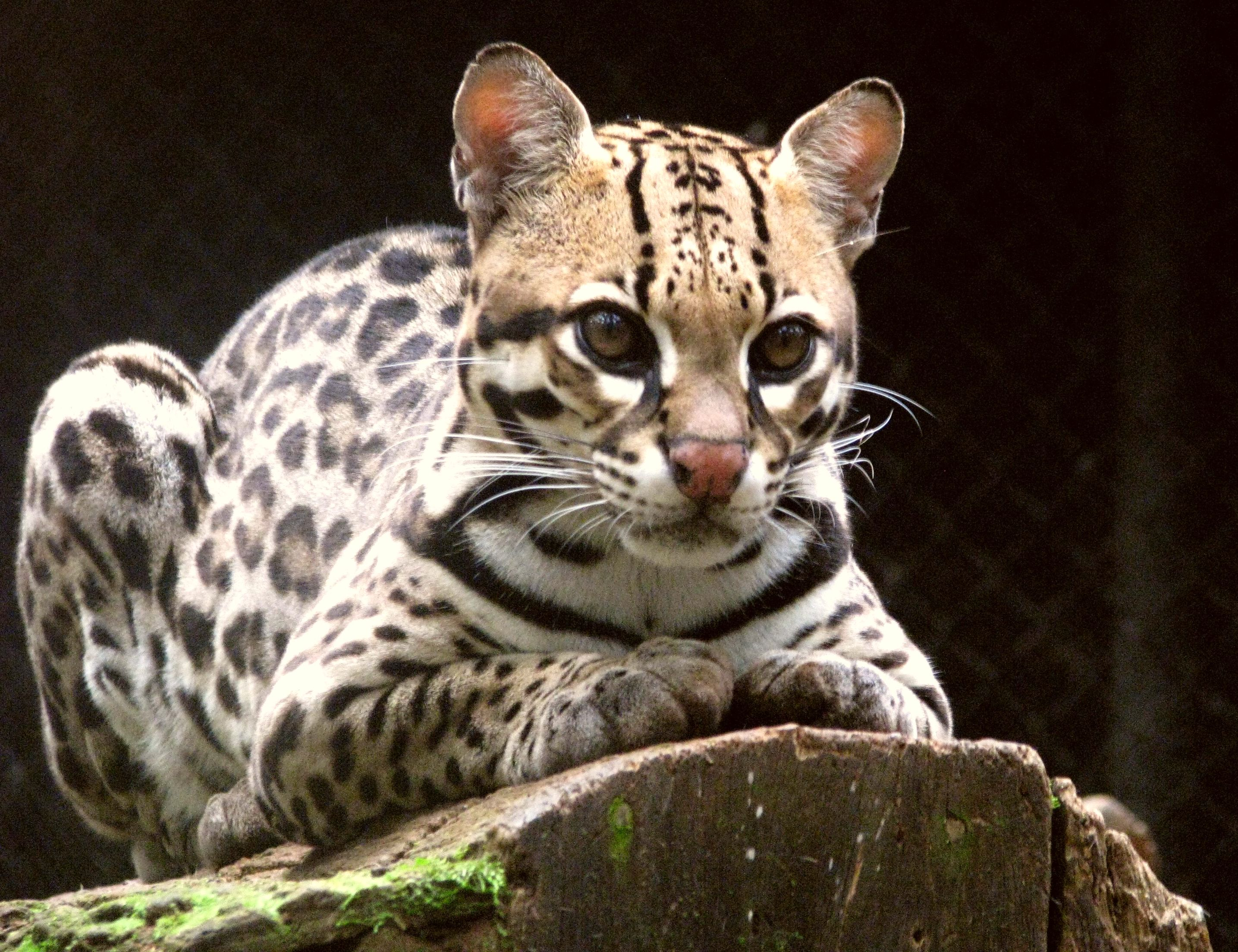
Ocelot

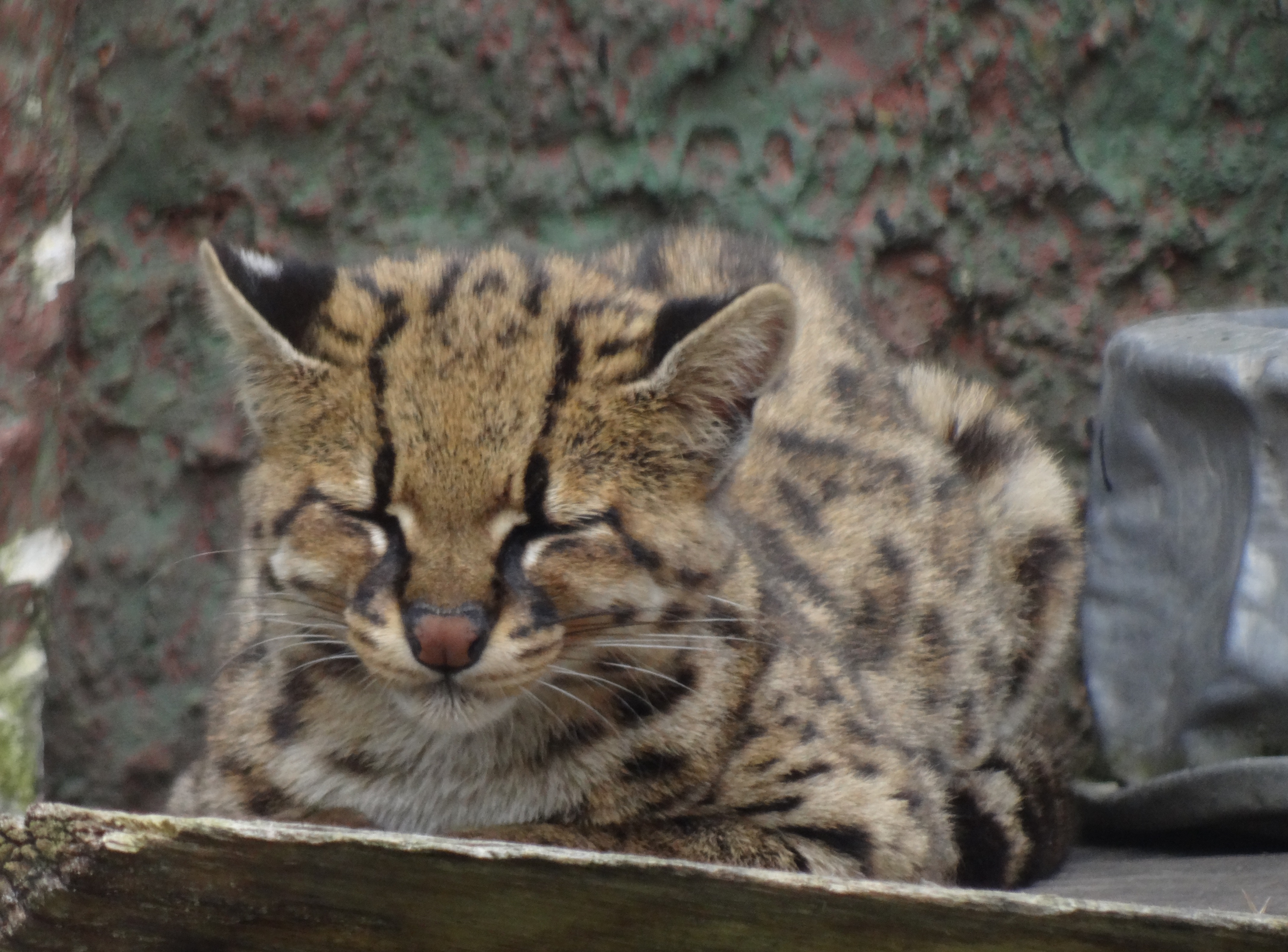
Margay

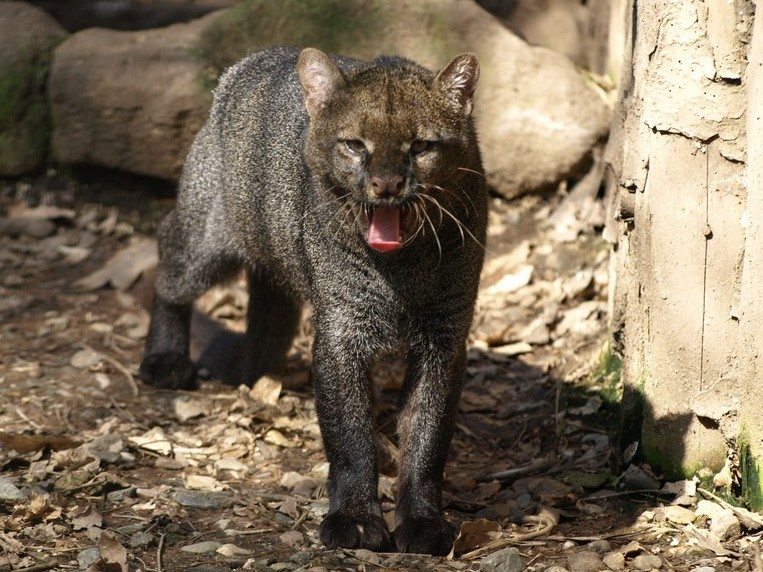
jaguarund

==== Mustelids ====
Mustelids include the tayra (Eira barbara), greater grison (Galictis vittata), and neotropical river otter (Lontra longicaudis).

==== Procyonidae ====
Procyonidae include the South American coati (Nasua nasua), kinkajou (Potos flavus), and crab-eating raccoon (Procyon cancrivorus).

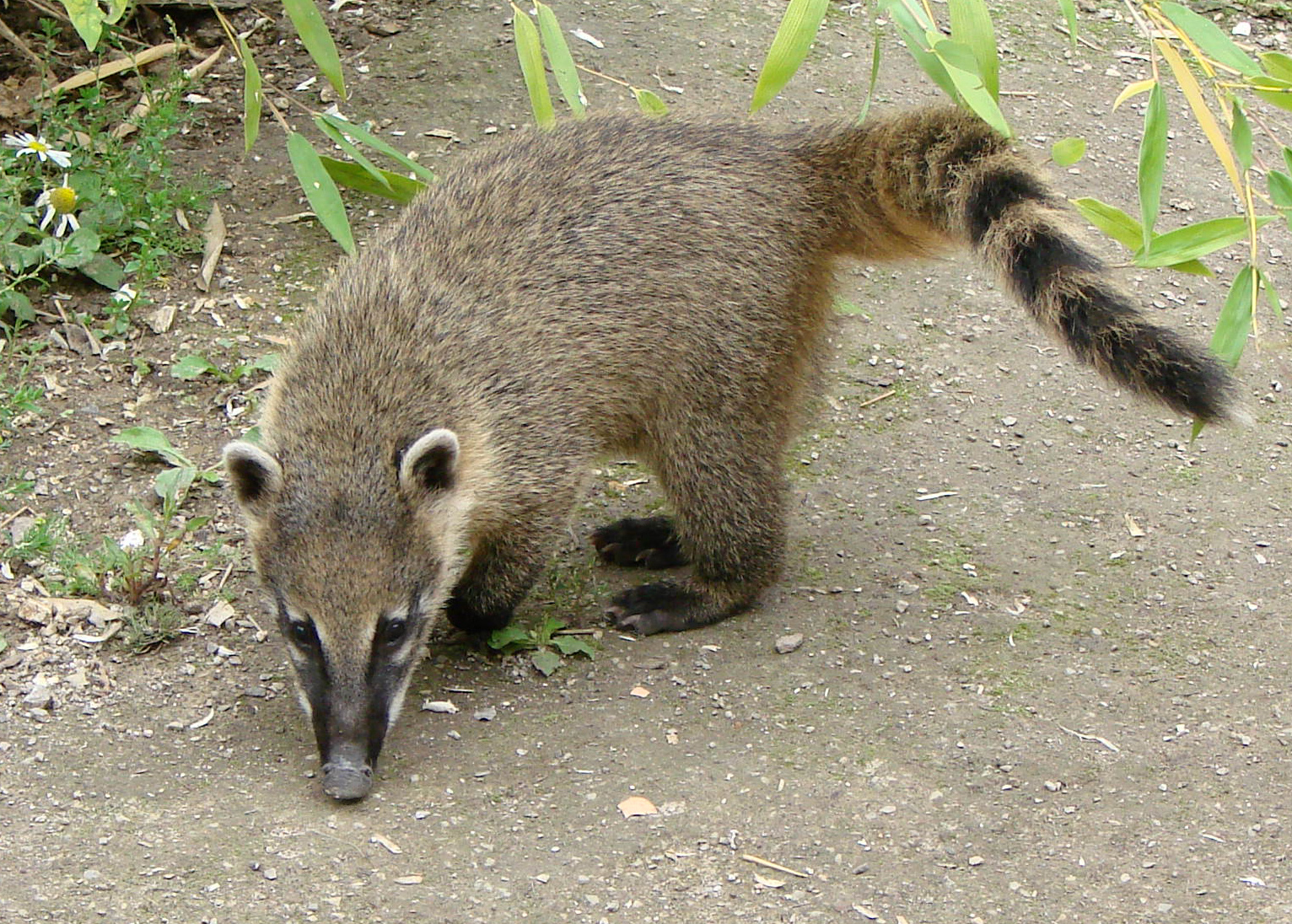
South American coati

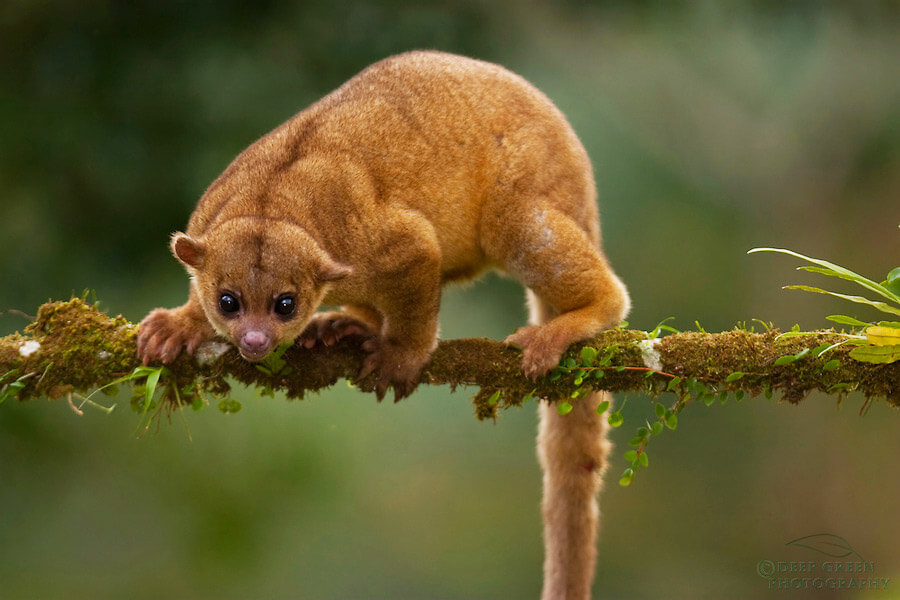
Kinkajou

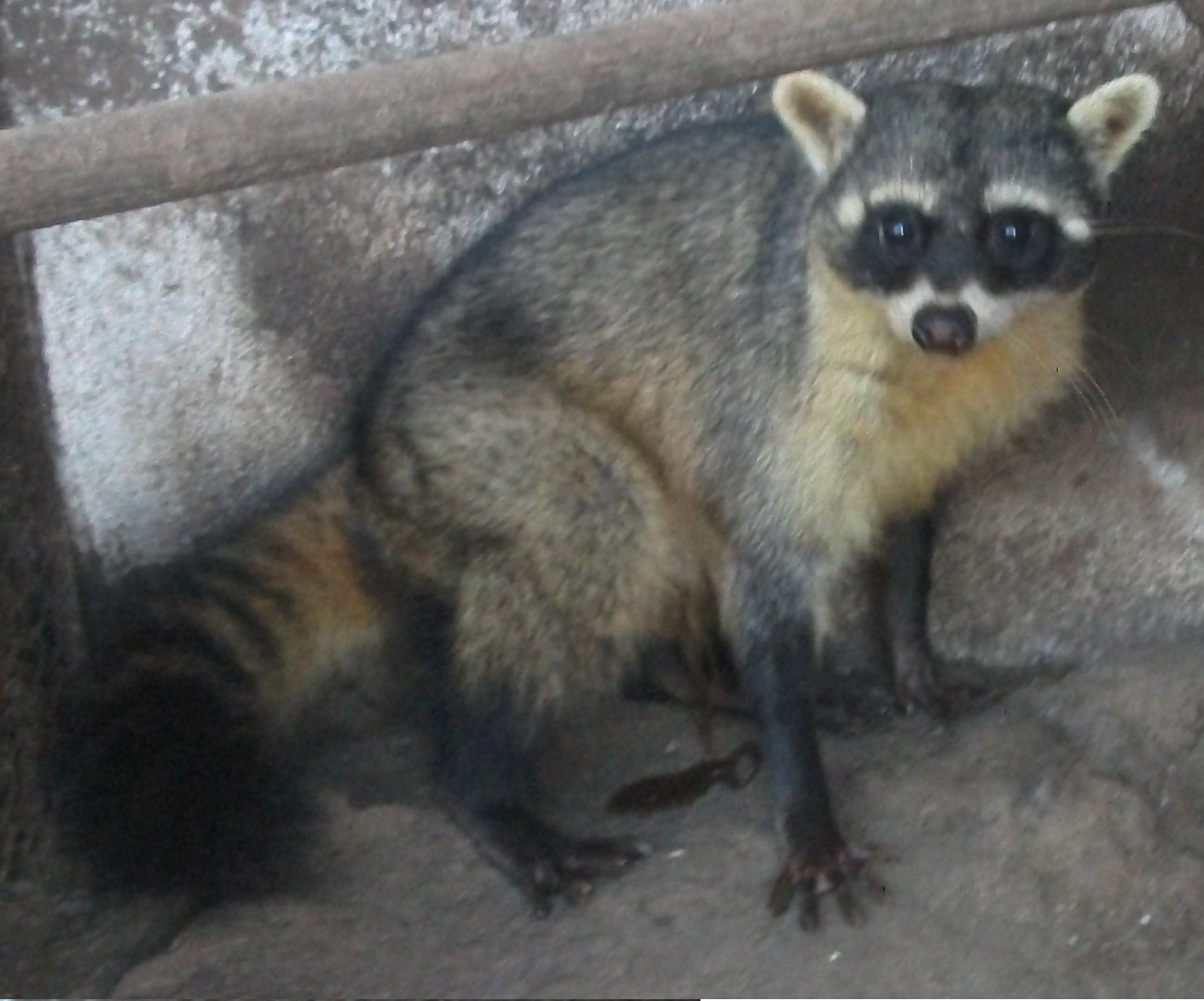
Crab-eating racoon

==== Porcupines ====
Porcupines include the black-tailed hairy dwarf porcupine (Coendou melanurus) and Brazilian porcupine (Coendou prehensilis).

==== Armadillo ====
Armadillos include the greater long-nosed armadillo (Dasypus kappleri), nine-banded armadillo (Dasypus novemcintus), giant armadillo (Priodontes maximus).

==== Anteater ====
Anteaters include the silky anteater (Cyclopes didactylus), giant anteater (Myrmecophaga tridactyla), and southern tamandua (Tamandua tetradactyla)

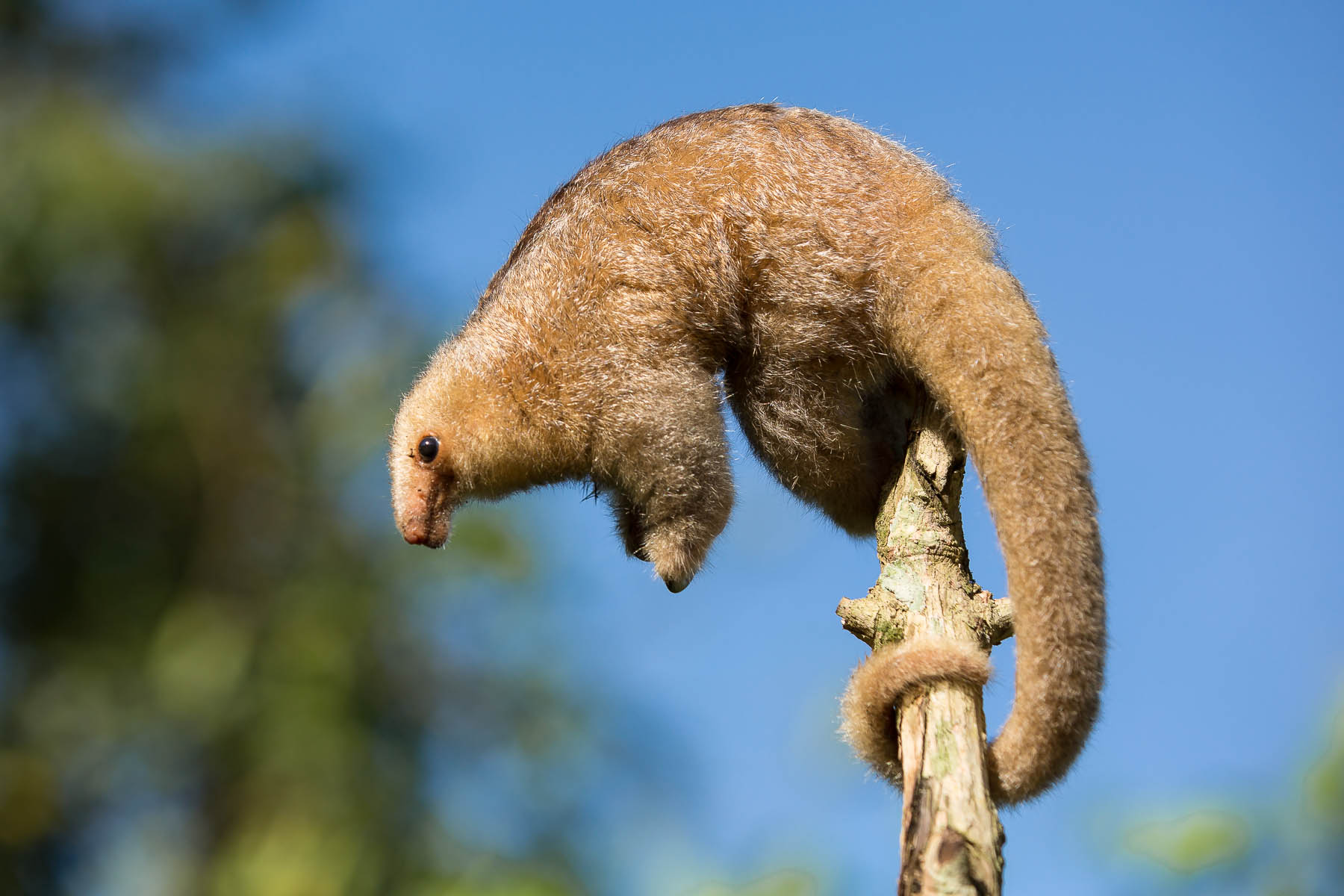
Silky Anteater

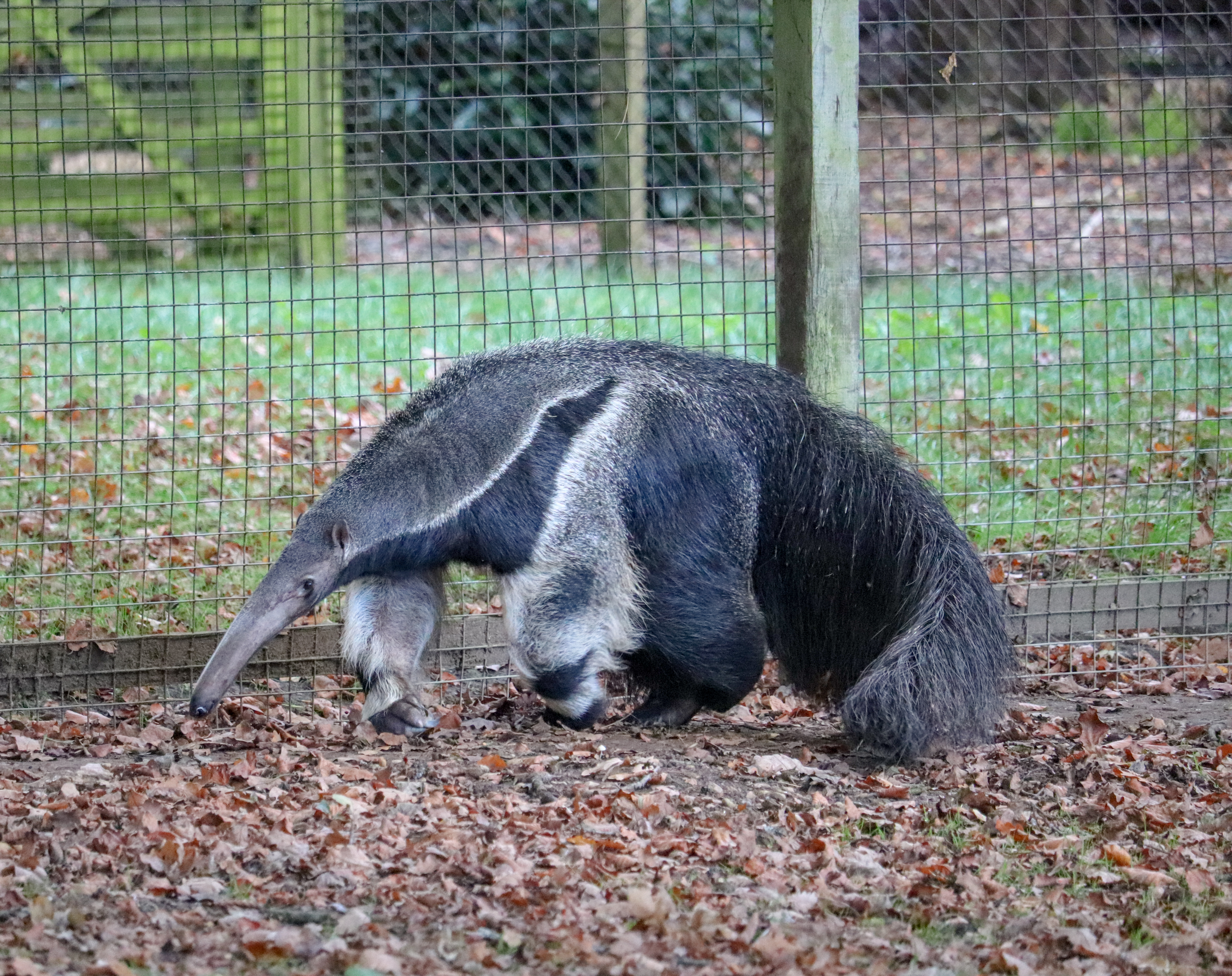
Giant anteater

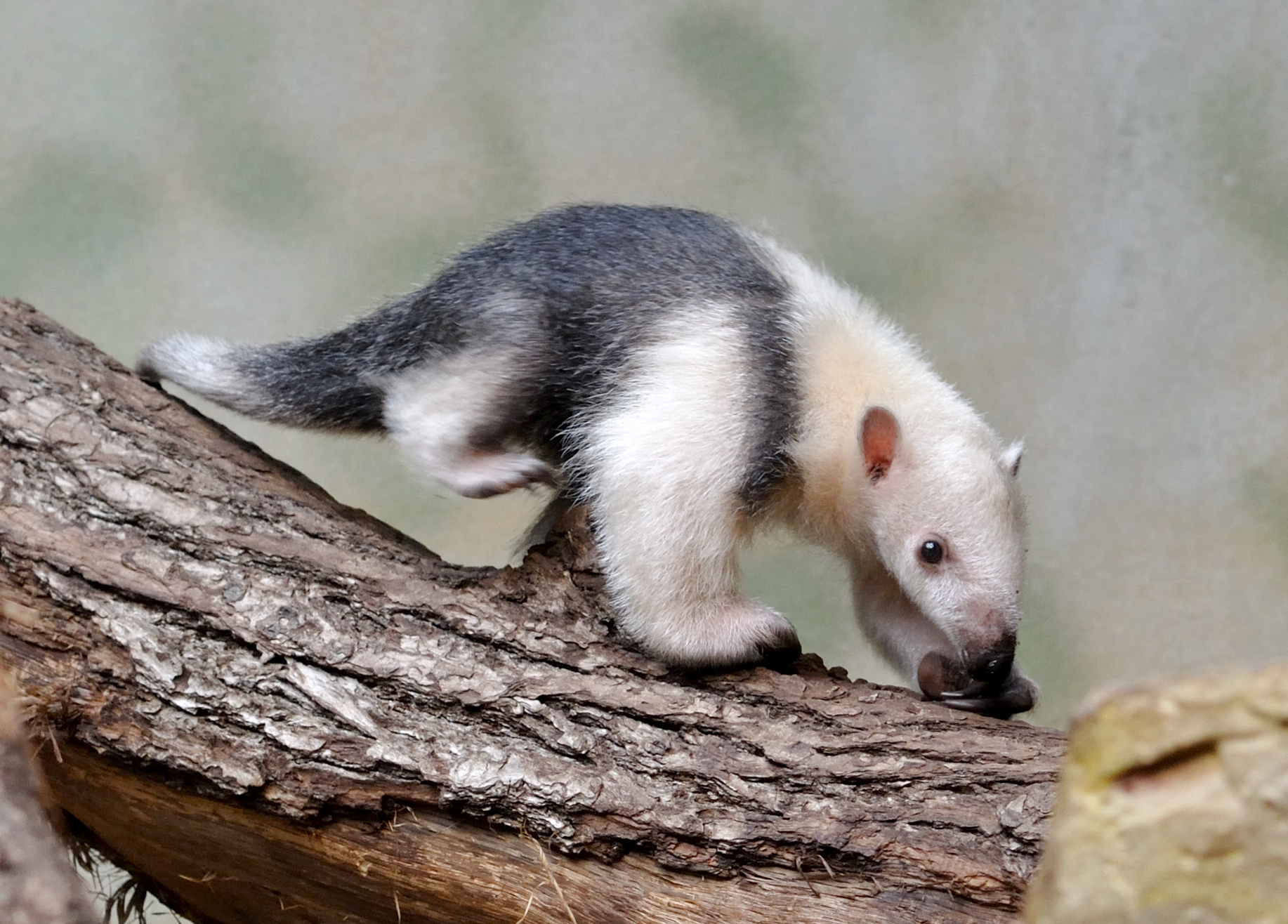
Southern tamandua

==== Bats ====
There are more than 100 species of bat in French Guyana. These bats play an important role in the dispersal of seeds especially in the dispersal of seeds in open areas. For example, the seeds plants including Cecropia, Solanum, and Vismia are often the first plants to grow in large open areas are readily dispersed by bats. Once the bat dispersed plants begin to grow, conditions improve for other seed dispersing animals such as birds and mammals who will then introduce the seeds of plants they transport into the area. While bats are vital to reforestation efforts, deforestation threatens bat species richness in the region. Forest corridors and forest blocks can effectively improve species richness.

==== Other Mammals ====
Other mammals in the park include collared peccary (Dicotyles tajacu), red brocket (Mazama americana), Amazonian brown brocket (Mazama nemorivaga), Guianan squirrel (Sciurus aestuans), Neotropical pygmy squirrel (Sciurillus pusillus), capybara (Hydrochoerus hydrochaeris), red-rumped agouti (Dasyprocta leporina), red acouchi (Myoprocta acouchy), lowland paca (Cuniculus paca), three-toed sloth (Bradypus tridactylus), two-toed sloth (Choloepus didactylus), and several species of rodents.

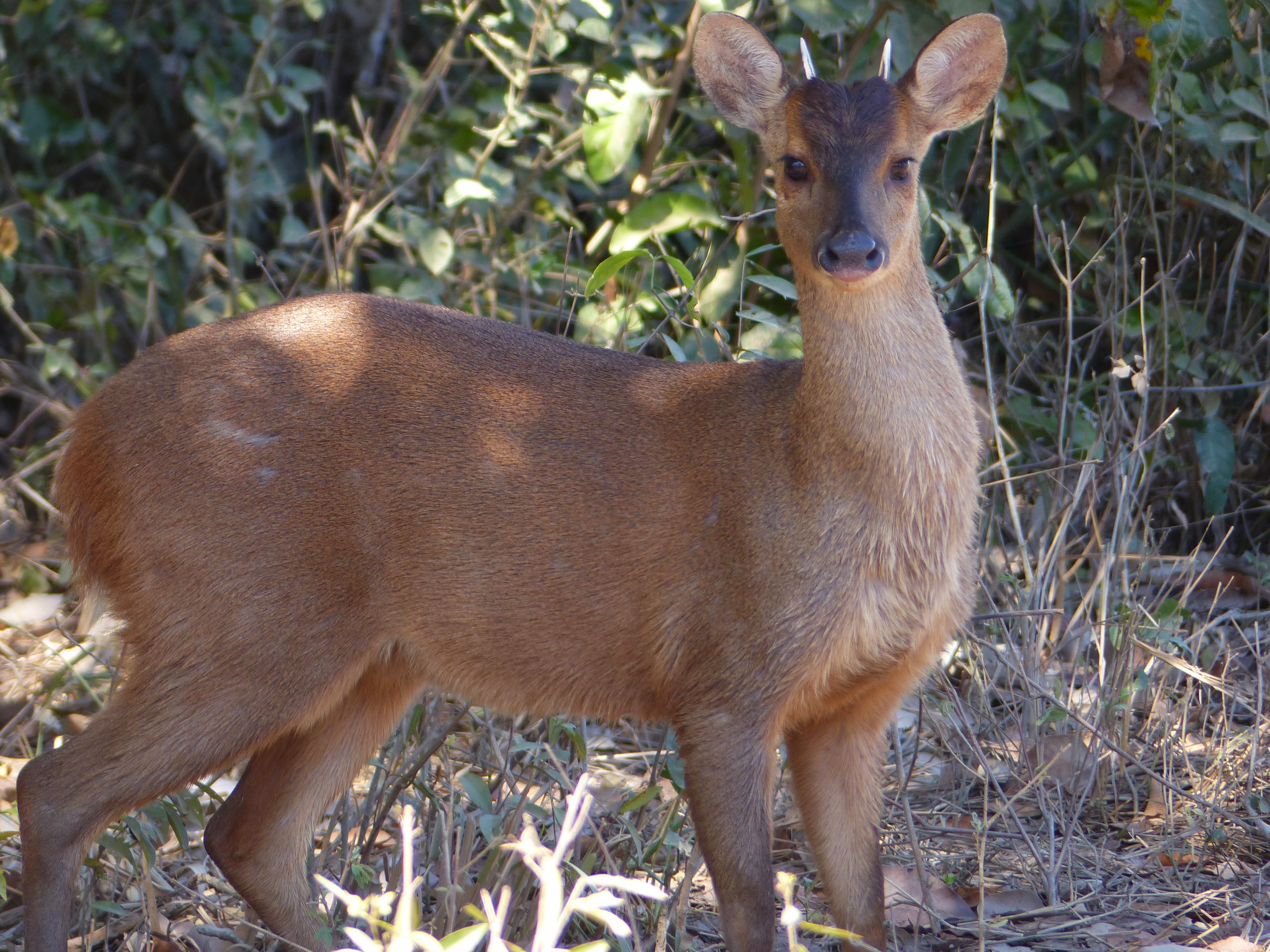
Red brocket

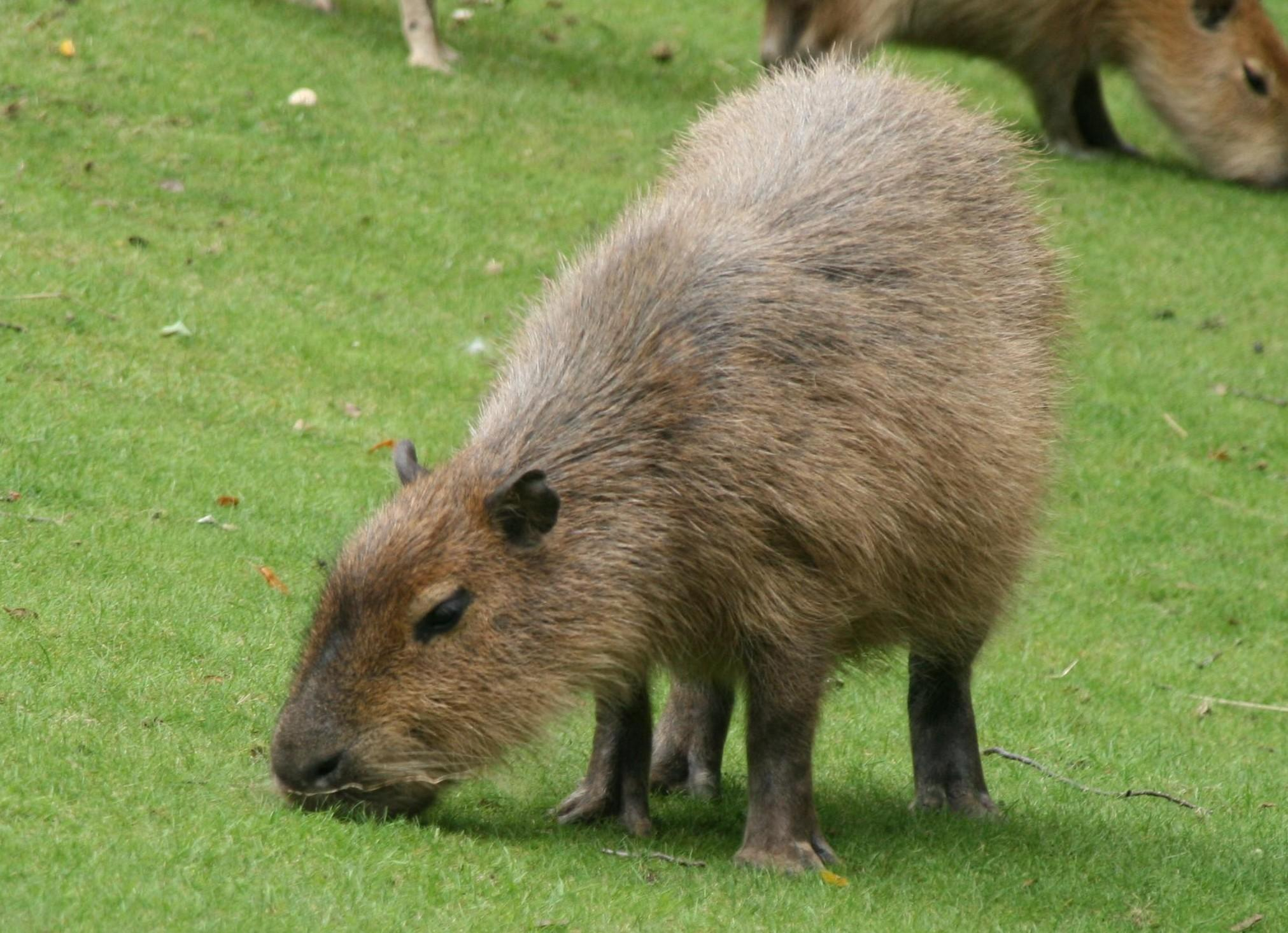
capybara

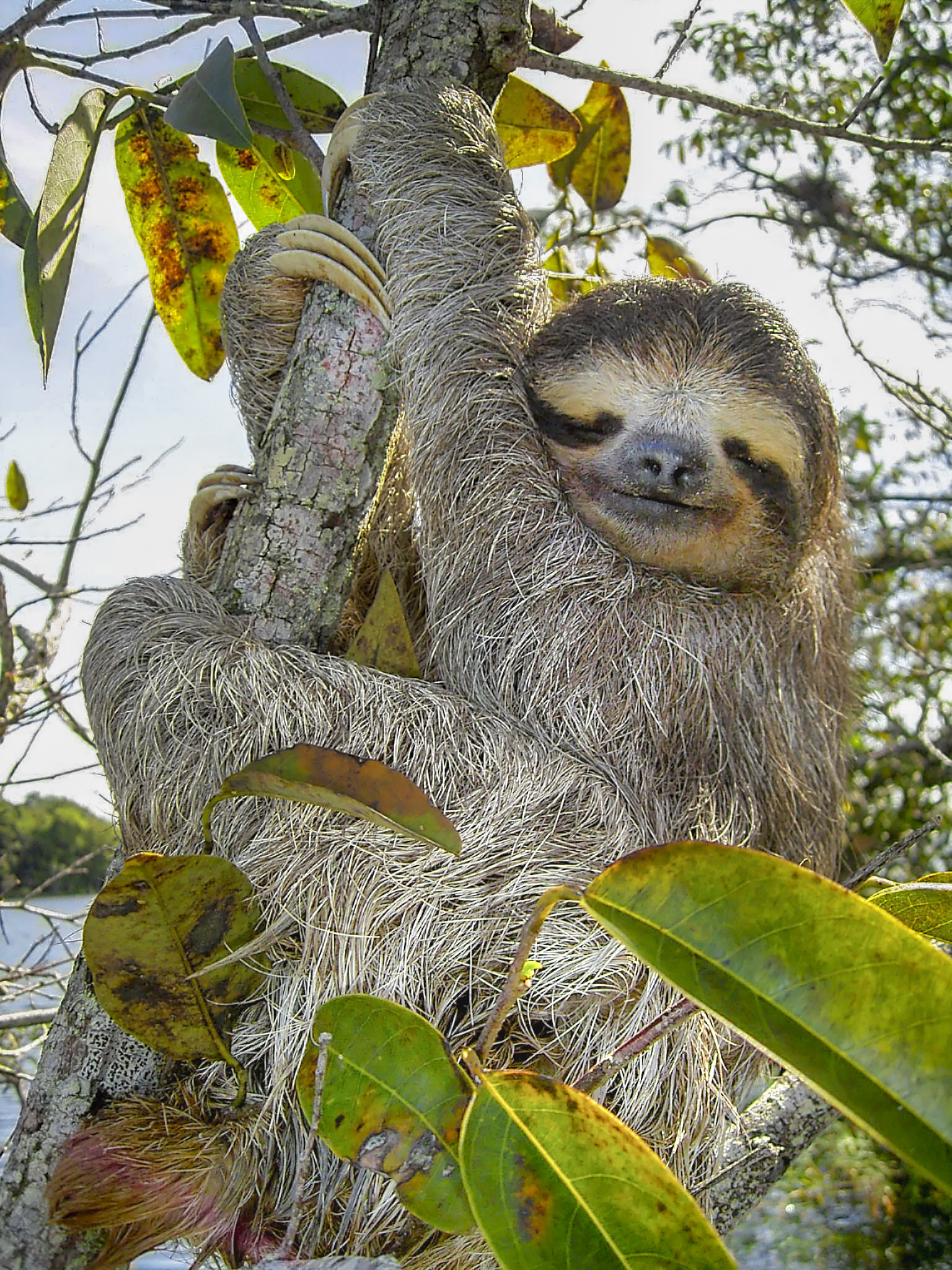
Three-toed sloth

=== Birds ===
There are more than 700 species of birds in French Guyana with more than 500 species located within the Park.

== Flora ==
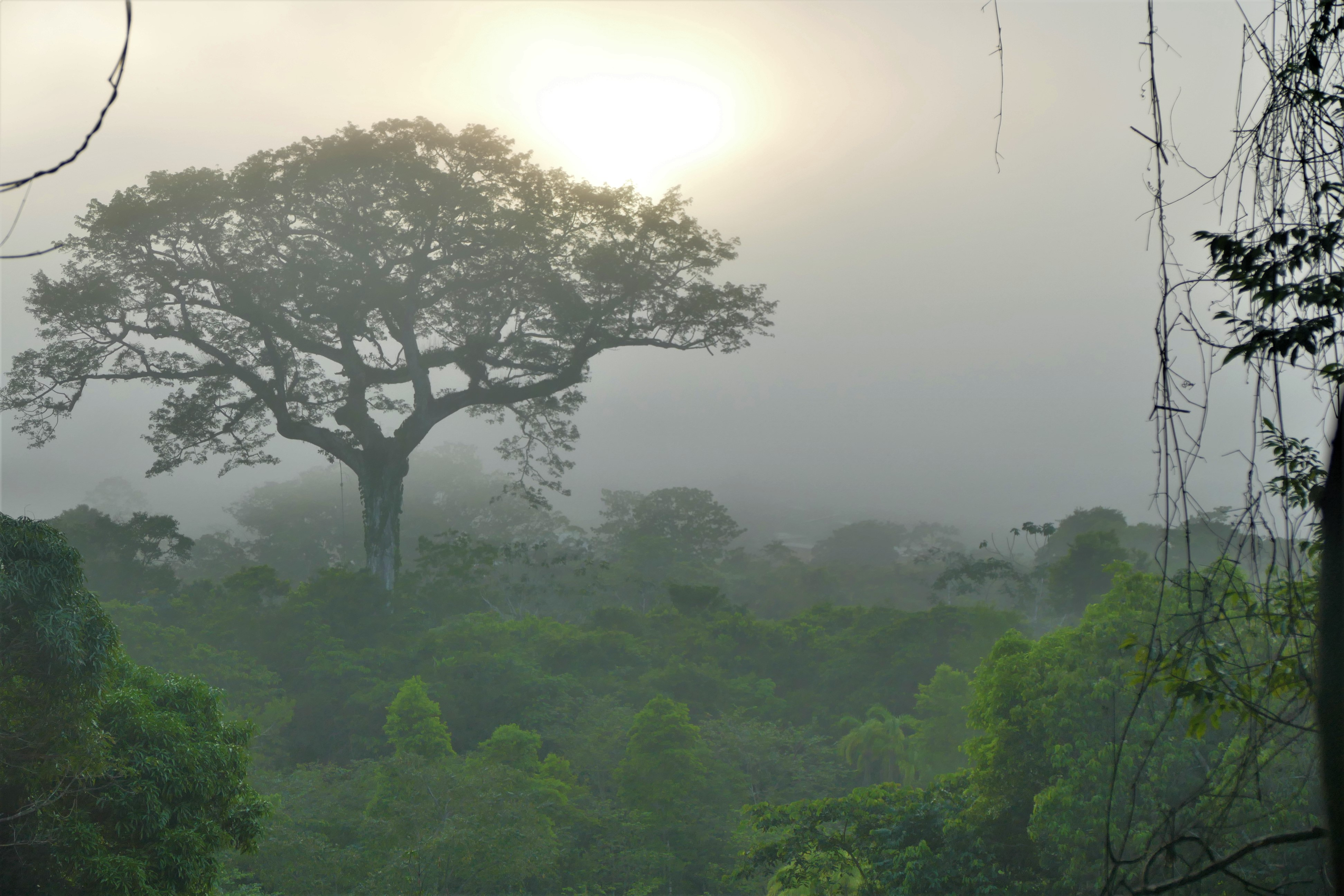
Forest view from Saül

Tropical forest covers most of the territory of the Park where the number of vascular plants present is estimated at between 4,000 and 5,000 species (including more than 1,000 trees), or a tenth of the world's plant biodiversity. The tallest trees such as the Hura crepitans and Ceiba pentandra can reach 55 to 65 meters in height. A single hectare of forest frequently contains more different species of trees than the entire flora of Metropolitan France.

== Tourism ==
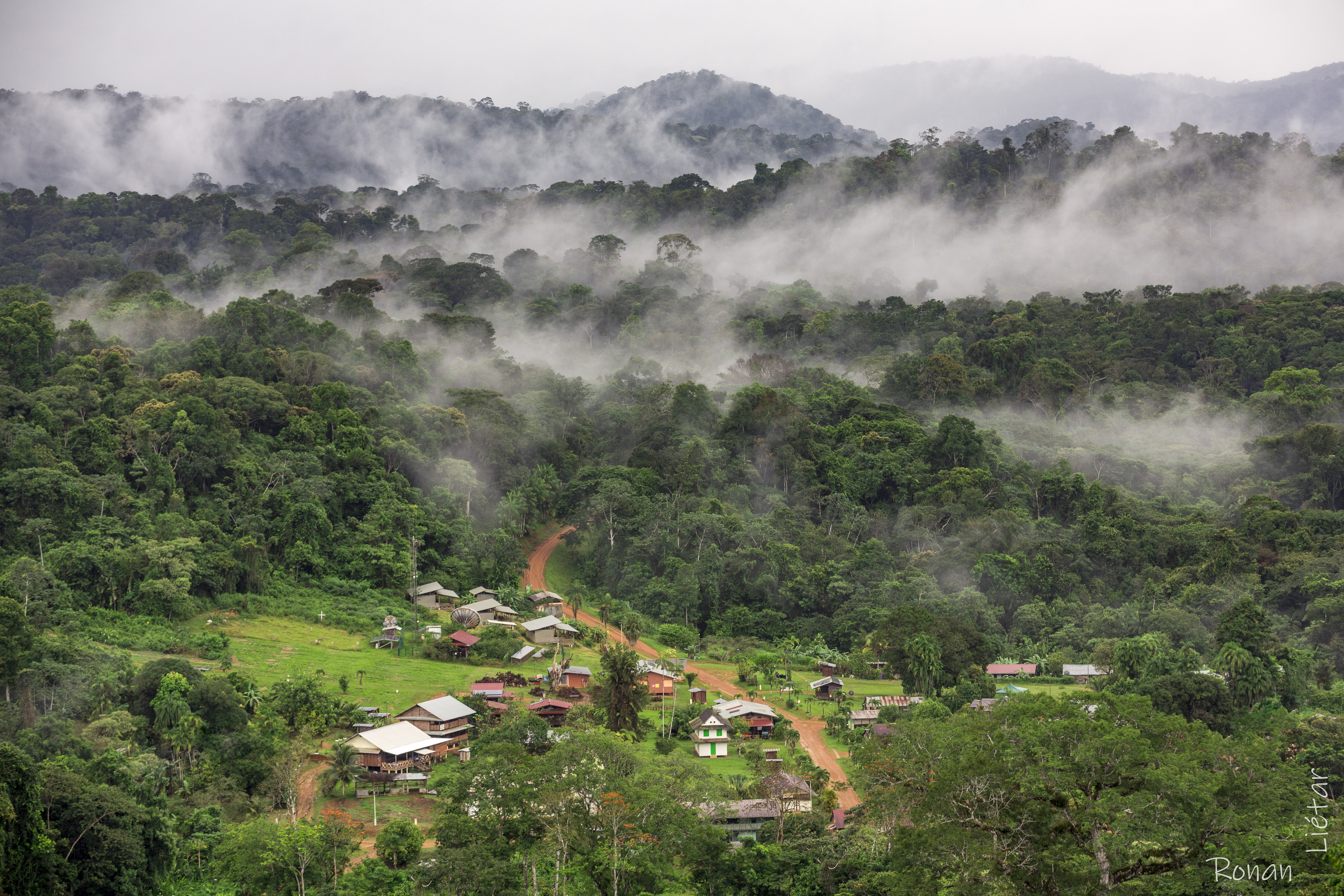
Village of Saül, the main entry point for tourists

Part of the National Parks of France, tourists can access the park. The park includes more than 130 km of trails with different levels of accessibility. Near the village of Saül there are 45 km of signposted trails designed for tourists. Five trails have been designed for visitors with reduced mobility as part of France's "Amazon for All" program. Other hiking and tourist opportunities exist including trails leading up to Mont Galbao, the inselberg Susu Bella, or Gobaya Soula falls.

== Bibliography ==
- Fleury, Marie; Karpe, Philippe (2006). "Le parc national de Guyane : un arbitrage difficile entre intérêts divergents". Open Edition. Journal de la Société des américanistes (in French). 92 (92-1 et 2). doi:10.4000/jsa.3210.
