= Wayampi =

Ethnic group in French Guiana and Brazil

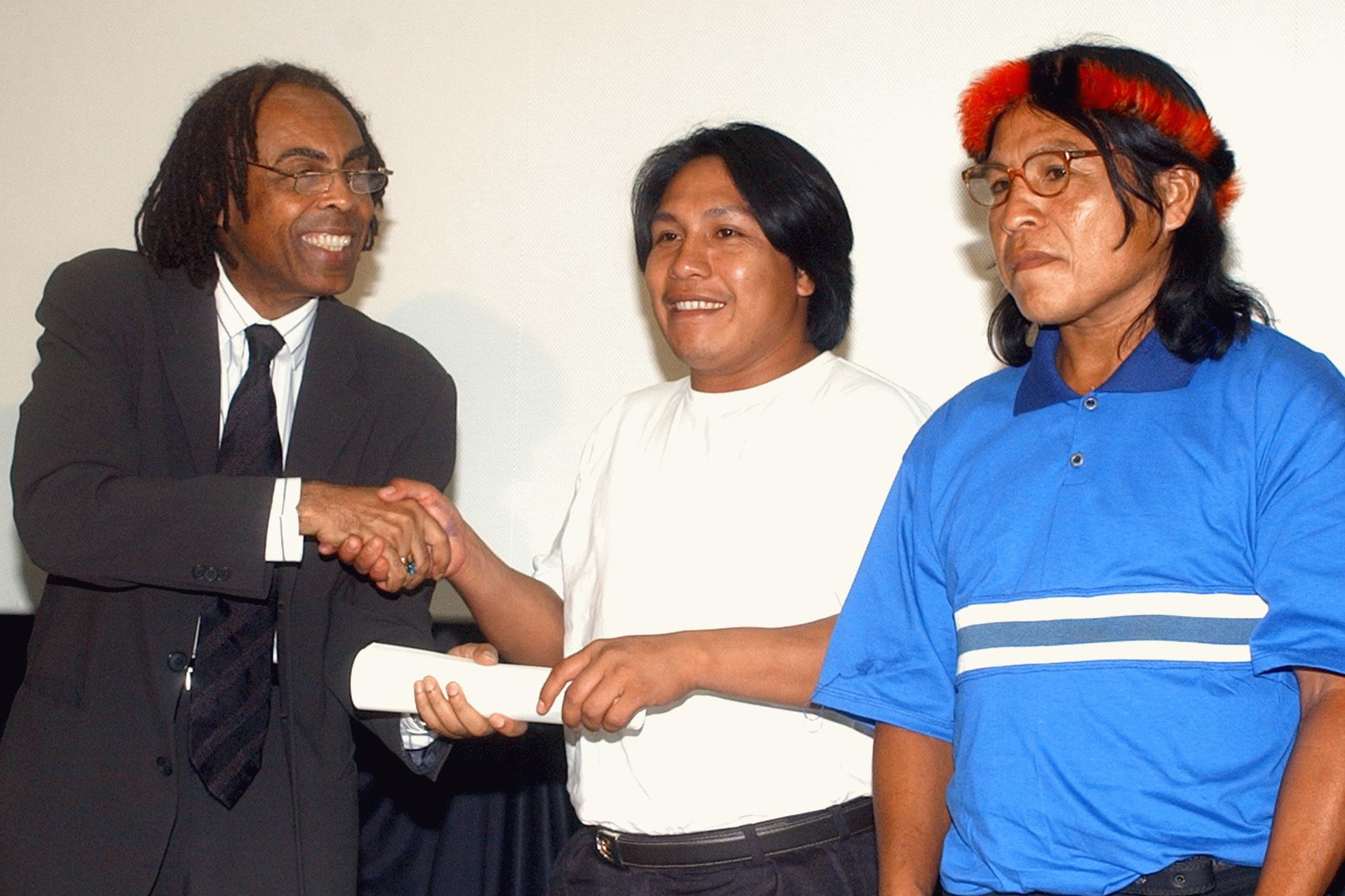
- Delivery of the UNESCO Certificate of Protection to the Wayampi

Total population
- 2,171

Regions with significant populations
- Brazil: 1,221 (2014)
- French Guiana: 950 (2009)

Languages
- Wayampi, French Guiana Creole, Portuguese

Religion
- traditional tribal religion

Wayampi or Wayãpi are an Indigenous people located in the south-eastern border area of French Guiana at the confluence of the rivers Camopi and Oyapock, and the basins of the Amapari and Carapanatuba Rivers in the central part of the states of Amapá and Pará in Brazil. The number of Wayampi is approximately 2,171 individuals. Approximately 950 live in French Guiana in two main settlements surrounded by little hamlets, and 1,221 live in Brazil in 49 villages.

== Names ==
The Wayampi are also known as the Wajãpi, Wayapi, Wajapi, Oiampi, Barnaré, Oyampi, Oyampik, Waiapi, Walãpi, Guaiapi, Guayapi, Oiampipucu, Oyampí, Oyampipuku, Oyanpík, Waiampi, Wajapae, Wajapuku, Wayapae, and Wayãpi people.

== Language ==
The Wayampi people speak the Wayampi language, which belongs to Subgroup VIII of the Tupi-Guarani languages. Wayampi has three dialects: Amapari Wayampi, Jari, and Oiyapoque Wayampi. The language is written phonetically based on the International Phonetic Alphabet, and not according to the French or Portuguese orthography. The literacy rates are low.

== History ==
The first Western documents about the Wayampi are Portuguese sources from 1690 mentioning the group's migration from the lower Xingu River to the Jari River, then northward along the Jari and Amapari rivers. The Wayampi had been fighting with the French colonialists. In 1738, a Jesuit mission opened on the river Oyapock near the current town of Camopi. The missionaries brought European diseases and caused a depopulation. In 1763, the Jesuits left and most of the population dispersed. From then on they became totally isolated. Reports from 1770 show a total population of 6,000, as compared with 835 in 1990. From 1820, some northern groups began making contact with French officials and Maroons, but most of the Wayampi continued their isolation in the Amazonian forest throughout the 18th and 19th centuries. The isolation was such that only temporary canoes could be built.

Only in the 1940s were the villages of French Guiana contacted by geographers; the Wayampi were in bad shape, diseases had ravaged the community, and the population was estimated at 230 people. Two schools were built in 1956 and 1971. In the 1960s, attempts were made in French Guiana to group the population into two bigger villages where the Wayampi had to live with the Teko. The attempts at concentration had limited success. The Wayampi did not have a tribal government, therefore a granman (paramount chief) was installed according to the Maroon hierarchy, but failed to catch on. In the 1960s, the French Government contacted all tribes to ask them whether they wanted French citizenship. The Wayampi and the Teko were the only tribes who decided against citizenship. In 2000, they accepted French citizenship.

In the late 1980s, gold was discovered near the river Camopi. Illegal gold miners moved into the area, and the villages of Vila Brasil and Ilha Bela were established opposite the town of Camopi where the majority of the French Wayampi were concentrated. With the gold prospectors came alcohol, prostitution and drugs. In the early 21st century, the tribe started to build hamlets with subsistence farms several kilometres from the main settlements. By 2010, there were 45 hamlets, and most had left the main town of Camopi.

The Fundação Nacional dos Povos Indígenas did not establish contact with the Wayampi in Brazil until 1973. Today, the various Wayampi communities are moderately acculturated at best. In 1976, the construction of highway BR-210 passed through Wayampi territory which had limited contact to the outside world. In the 1980s, the tribe attacked and construction of the highway halted and will probably never be completed. Air reconnaissance has identified two subgroups of Wayampi which are probably uncontacted. The majority of the Brazilian population lives in the Terra Indígena Waiãpi (Wayampi Indigenous Territory), an autonomous district with restricted access, which had been established in 1996.

== Economy ==
The Wayampi practice slash-and-burn agriculture and subsist primarily on cassava, sweet potatoes, yams, and bananas. Among the groups of the Amapari and upper Oyapok rivers hunting is the most important, while bow- and arrow-fishing is predominant for the northernmost group. With the exception of the Mariry community, which carries out limited exploitation of gold claims, there is little participation in the cash economy.

The Wayampi were part of the great commercial link of the Wayana Indians which extended form the Amapari river in Brazil as far as the Tapanahoni river in Suriname. They traded cotton thread, hunting dogs and feather crowns mainly for tools. Today this network has been disrupted by the increased control of national boundaries, though it remains alive between various Wayampi groups. Since the late 1970s Western goods replaced local manufactures, with the exception of baskets and cotton-woven hammocks. Such products as ammunition, fishhooks, pans, and glass beads are increasingly traded.

== Villages ==
French Guiana (Note: Estimation based on the total population of 590 for Trois Sauts, and 1,677 for the commune in 2012. The figures do not distinguish tribe, however the figures show that 35% of the commune lives in/around Trois Saults and 65% in/around Camopi.)
Place	Population	Comment
Camopi	600–650	main town
Trois Sauts	300–350	cluster of four villages: Roger, Zidock, Yawapa, and Pina.

Brazil:
Place	Inhabitants
Akaju	33
Aruwã'ity	49
Cinco Minutos	60
Jakareãkagokã	47
Jovem de Deus	32
Karapijuty	55
Karavovõ	48
Kupa'u	45
Kwapoywyry (Aramirã II)	57
Mogywyry (Piaui)	54
Najaty	53
Okakai	36
Pairakae	42
Suisuimënë	11 (minority)
Tabokal	57
Takweniwi (Note: Located inside the Tumucumaque Mountains National Park.)	133
Yululuwi	50
Ytawa	65
Ytuwasu	117
Yvytõtõ	38
