= Tumucumaque =

Tumucumaque can refer to:

- The Tumuk Humak Mountains, also known as the Sierra Tumucumaque
- The Tumuk Humak Uplands of the Guiana Shield
- Tumucumaque Mountains National Park, Brazil's largest national park
- codename for Mozilla Firefox 4 web browser
