= Clevelândia do Norte =

- District and village
- Location in Brazil Clevelândia do Norte (Brazil)
- Coordinates: 3.8142°N 51.8655°W
- Country: Brazil
- Region: North
- State: Amapá
- Municipality: Oiapoque

Population (2010)
  - Total: 1,253
- Time zone: UTC−3 (BRT)

Clevelândia do Norte is a district of the Brazilian city of Oiapoque, Amapá, by the Oyapock River.

== History ==
In 1922 an agricultural outpost called the Núcleo Colonial Cleveland was transformed into a political and criminal concentration camp during the presidency of Artur Bernardes (1922–1926). Many Brazilian anarchist militants were sentenced to hard labour here. Of the 946 prisoners interned at Clevelândia between 1924 and 1927, 491 died. Many of the survivors returned to São Paulo and Rio de Janeiro permanently sickened with malaria.

Since 1940, the 34th Infantry Battalion of Selva is stationed at Clevelândia do Norte.

== Vila Brasil ==
The village of Vila Brasil is located in the district on the Oiapoque River opposite Camopi, French Guiana. The village is inside the Tumucumaque Mountains National Park. Vila Brasil was founded in the 1930s as a tiny hamlet around the post of the Indian Protection Service.

In the 1980s, it developed into a commercial centre catering to the French town of Camopi, because of significantly lower prices. In 2002, the Tumucumaque Mountains National Park was created, and even though the area was supposed to be uninhabited, it was decided to allow the village. In 2019, the population was estimated at 200 people.

== Ilha Bela ==
Later, the village of Ilha Bela emerged next to Vila Brasil as a garimpeiros (illegal gold prospector) settlement. The population was estimated at almost 400 people in 2019. The village operates a safe haven for the gold prospectors who do their exploration in French Guiana. The French 3rd Foreign Infantry Regiment has been stationed across the river to protect the border and prevent gold exploration. Ilha Bela was raided by the Brazilian police and army in May 2019, however everybody had left the village, and only supplies were confiscated.
