= Waki (river) =

Waki Ouaqui
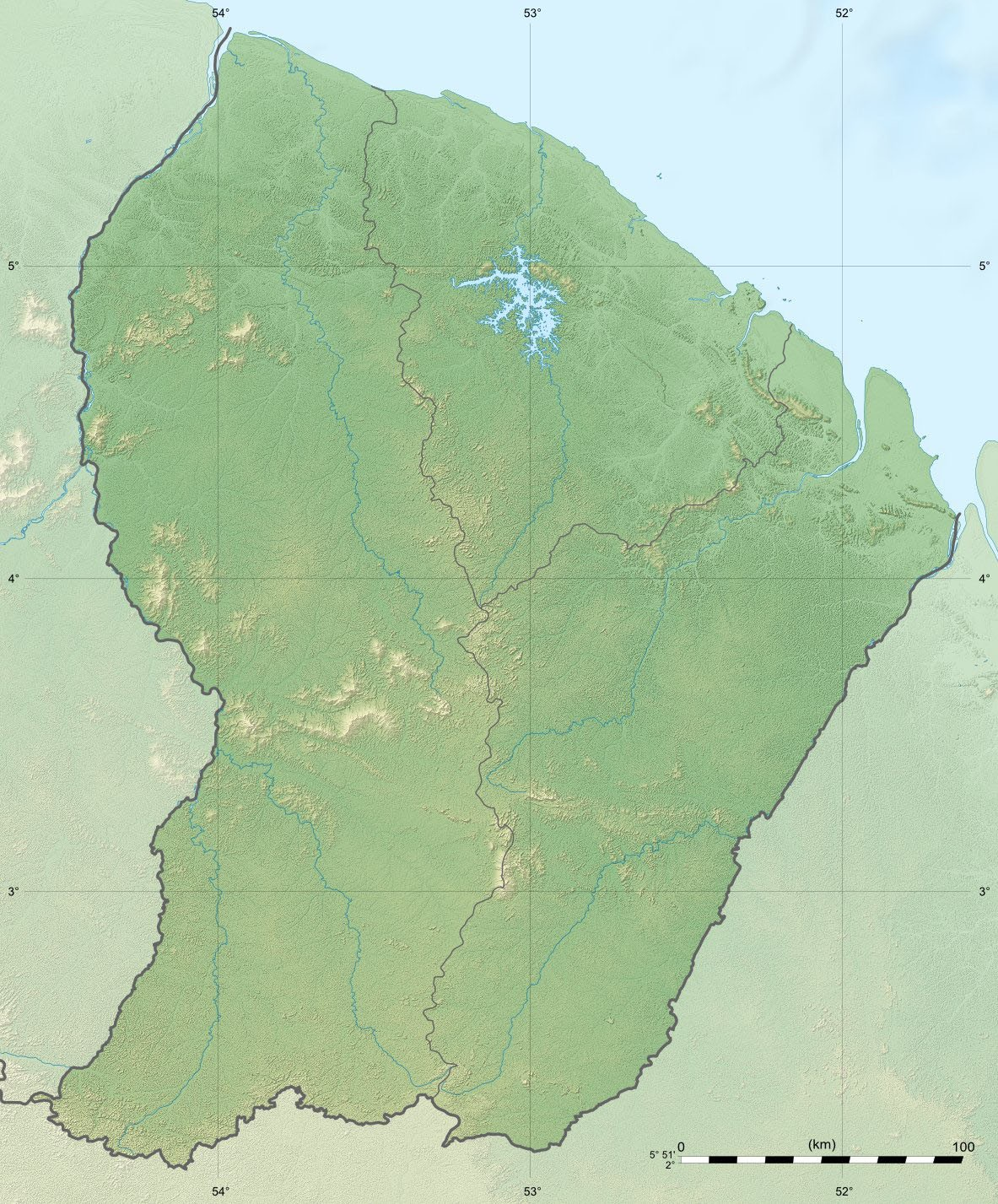
- Location within French Guiana

Location
- Country: France
- Region: French Guiana

Physical characteristics
- Source
  - location: Confluence of the Grande Waki and Petite Waki
  - coordinates: 3.1848°N 53.4793°W
- Mouth: Tampok
  - coordinates: 3.4074°N 53.8295°W
- Length: 147 km (91 mi)

Basin features
- Progression: Tampok→ Lawa→ Maroni→ Atlantic Ocean

The Waki (or Ouaqui) is a river in western French Guiana. It is a right tributary of the Tampok (Maroni basin). It is 147 km (91 mi) long. The river has its source as the confluence of the southern Grande Waki which has its source in the Arawa Mountains, and the northern Petite Waki which has its source in the Sommet Tabulaire.

Waki was at the heart of a late 19th century gold rush, and the banks of river contain gold mining settlements like Grigel. In the 1970s, the area was completely abandoned. Yet traces of Amerindian presence and Balatá harvesting by the Aluku Maroons is still visible. In the early 21st century, garimpeiros (illegal gold miners) have been active on the river again.

== Bibliography ==
- Blancaneaux, Philippe; Rostan, J. J. (1974). Reconnaissance pedologique de la Guyane Française (PDF) (in French). Office de la recherche scientifique et technique outre-mer.
