= Bienvenue =

Bienvenue may refer to:

- Fulgence Bienvenüe (1852–1936), French civil engineer largely known for construction of Paris underground railway
- Bienvenue, French Guiana, a town in French Guiana
- Bayou Bienvenue, a bayou in Louisiana
- Bienvenue was a 28-gun French warship launched in 1788. She was captured by the British in 1794 and renamed HMS Undaunted.
