= Teko people =

Ethnolinguistic group native to French Guiana

Teko
Emerillon
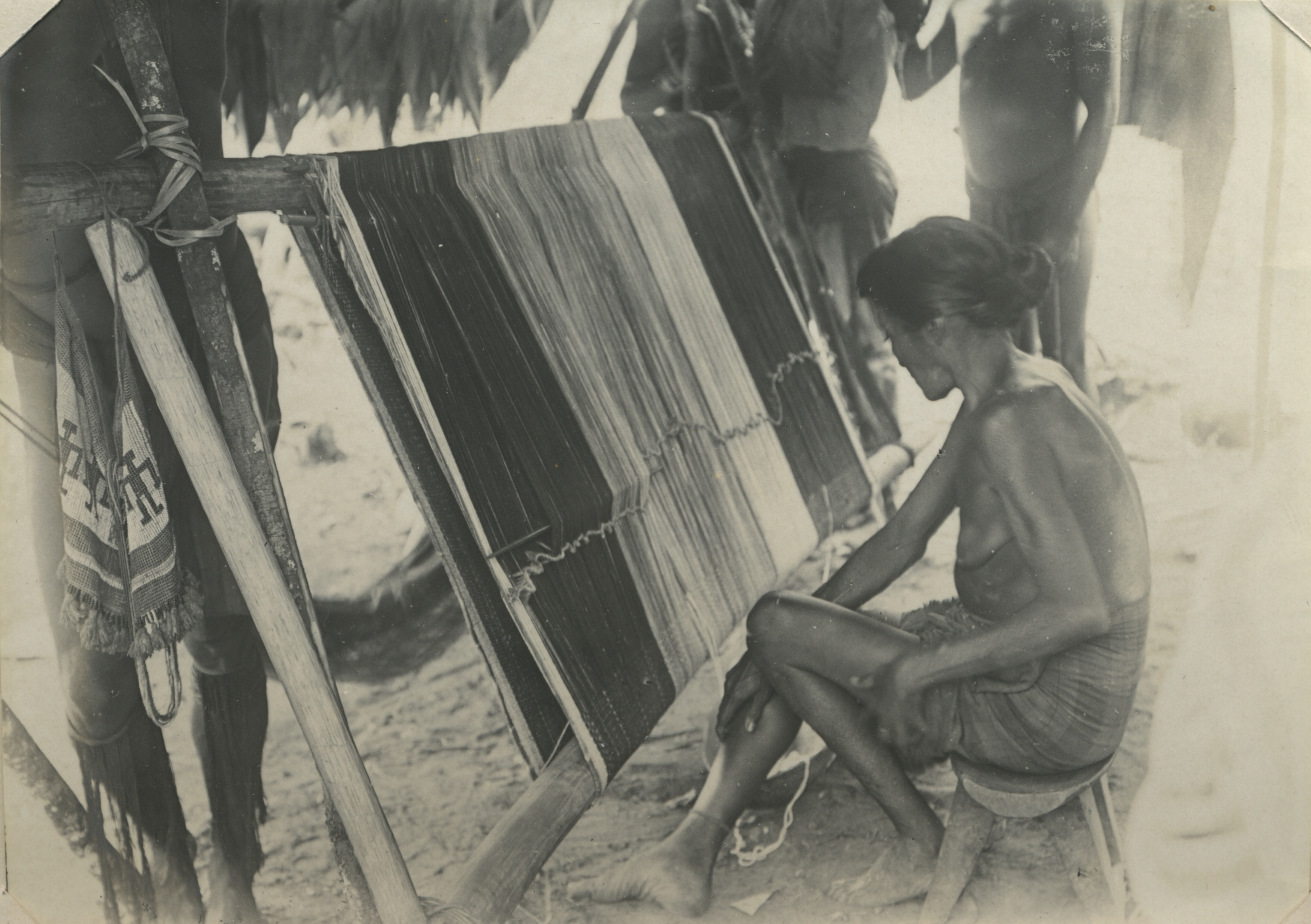
- Teko woman weaving a hammock (1903)

Total population
- 410 (2010, est.)

Regions with significant populations
- Camopi, French Guiana

Languages
- Emerillon, French

Religion
- Traditional Amerindian

Related ethnic groups
- Wayampi, Wayana

The Teko (also called Emerillon, Emerilon, Emerion, Mereo, Melejo, Mereyo, Teco) are a Tupi–Guarani-speaking people in French Guiana living on the banks of the Camopi and Tampok rivers. Their subsistence is based on horticulture, hunting and various fishing techniques. As of 2010 they numbered about 410 individuals.

== History ==
The Teko constitute one of the six now-living ethnic groups of French Guiana already present before colonization. More nomadic than the other ethnic groups of the area, the Teko resided on different rivers in French Guiana during the colonial period, notably on the Approuague and, more recently, they settled within the surroundings of the rivers Tampok and Maroni near the border with Suriname, and the river Camopi near the border with Brazil. Their villages, usually located at a distance from the rivers for protection from raids, were moved frequently due to soil exhaustion, warfare, and several customary reasons, like the death of a chief.

The Teko's first contact with the Europeans occurred in 1767 when an expedition led by Patris, came across the tribe. The number of people was estimated at 350 to 400. They were in continuous warfare against the Kalina people who often raided their territory. By the 19th century internal and intertribal warfare had weakened the Teko to the point of being collective slaves to the Wayampi. The tribal warfare ended after the French government had threatened a military intervention. The fighting, along with the epidemics, greatly reduced their numbers. In 1849, Bagot estimated their numbers around 100 people.

By the late 1960s, the Teko were in a poor state of health, however due to general health improvements and various demographic strategies, they have since grown to the number of approximately 400. In the 1960s, the French Government contacted all tribes to ask them whether they wanted French citizenship. The Wayampi, who did accept citizenship in 2000, and the Teko were the only tribes who decided against citizenship. During the same period, the French government tried to concentrate the population in larger villages with limited success. The government installed male captains, based on the Maroon hierarchy, to head the villages, however being a matrilocality, the position was often inherited by the widow. In 2012, the Teko resisted the creation of the Guiana Amazonian Park as a restriction to their free movement.

== Lifestyle ==
The Teko practice slash-and-burn agriculture and complement the food supply with hunting, gathering and fishing. Many of the villagers live in wooden huts with palm leaves, however concrete houses are becoming more common.

The tribe is matrilocal, i.e. the husband moves into the wife's village. In the 1960s polygamy was still being practised, but in decline. Marriages with other tribes and ethnic groups was on the rise.

== Language ==
Emerillon is the eponymous term for their language which belongs to the Tupi–Guarani family. An identifying characteristic of the language is nasal harmony. The language is still being passed on to the children as the native language, however French, Portuguese and Wayampi are becoming secondary languages. The effect is mainly limited to borrowing of the lexicon of the European languages, however the language is considered endangered.

== Villages ==
Teko settlements

The Teko are in a minority in the following Wayana villages:

- Antécume-Pata
- Élahé
- Kayodé

The Teko are in a minority in the following Wayampi villages:

- Camopi
- Trois Sauts

== Bibliography ==
- Daby, Damien; Tritsch, Isabelle (2012). "Construction et restructuration territoriale chez les Wayãpi et Teko de la commune de Camopi, Guyane française". Research Gate (in French).
- Rose, Françoise (2008). "A typological overview of Emerillon, a Tupí-Guaraní language from French Guiana". Linguistic Typology. 12 (3): 431–460. doi:10.1515/LITY.2008.044. S2CID 55224396.
- Hurault, Jean (1963). "Les Indiens Émerillon de la Guyane française". Persee. Journal de la société des américanistes (in French). 52 (1): 133–156. doi:10.3406/jsa.1963.1998.
- Møhl, Perle (2012). Omens and Effect: Divergent Perspectives on Emerillon Time, Space and Existence. Semeïon Editions. ISBN 979-10-90448-02-5.
- Wilbert, Johannes; Levinson, David (1994). Encyclopedia of World Cultures. Volume 7: South America. Boston: G. K. Hall. ISBN 0-8161-1813-2
