= Tumucumaque Mountains National Park =

National park of Brazil

- IUCN category II (national park)
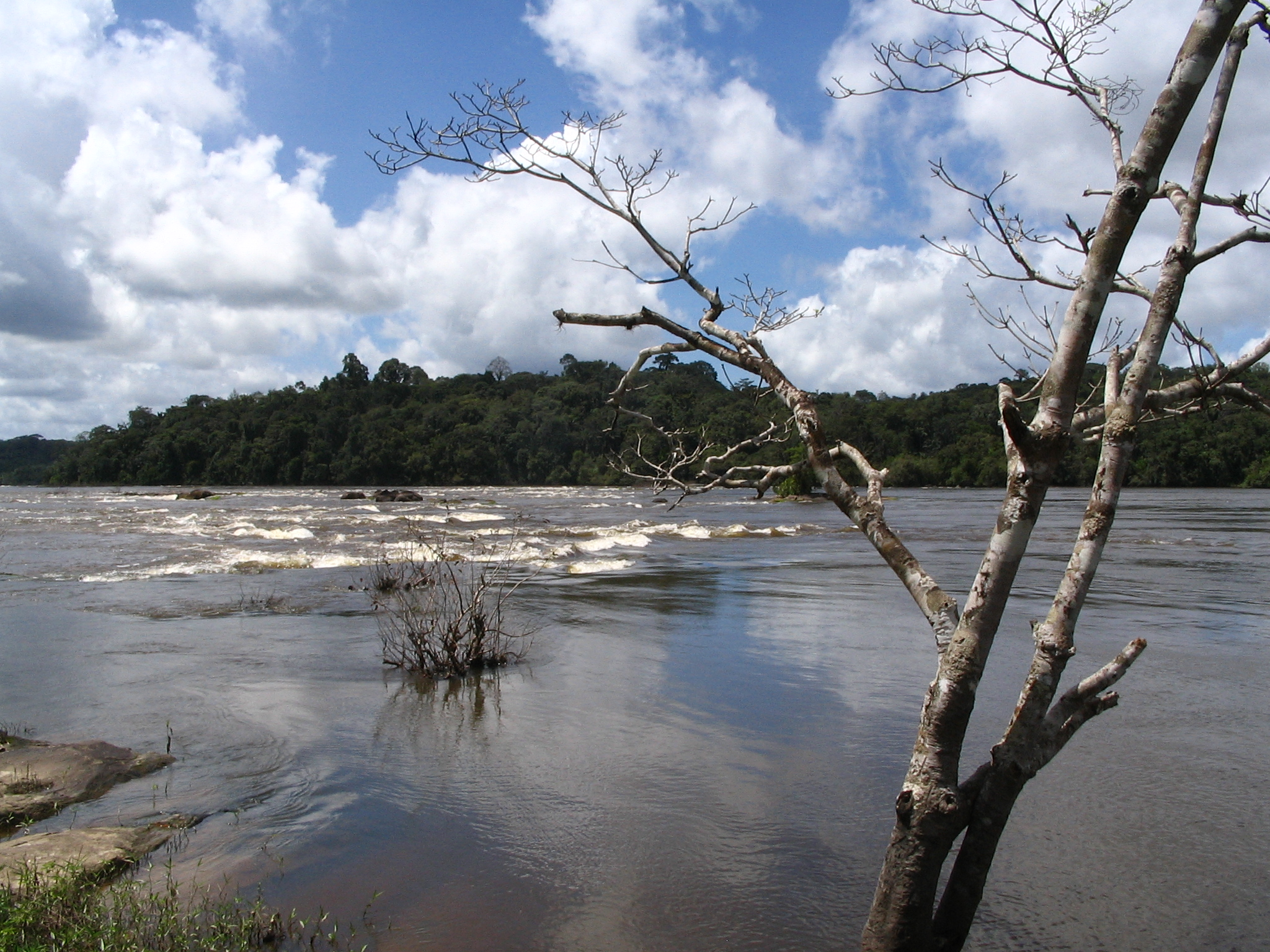

- Location within Brazil
- Interactive map of Tumucumaque Mountains National Park
- Location: Amapá and Pará, Brazil
- Nearest city: Serra do Navio, Pedra Branca do Amapari, Oiapoque
- Coordinates: 1°50′N 54°0′W
- Area: 38,874 km^{2} (15,009 sq mi)
- Established: August 23, 2002
- Governing body: Chico Mendes Institute for Biodiversity Conservation

The Tumucumaque Mountains National Park (Portuguese: Parque Nacional Montanhas do Tumucumaque; Portuguese pronunciation: [tumukuˈmaki]) is situated in the Amazon rainforest in the Brazilian states of Amapá and Pará. It is bordered to the north by French Guiana and Suriname.

== History ==
Tumucumaque was declared a national park on August 23, 2002, by the Government of Brazil, after collaboration with the WWF. It is part of the Amapá Biodiversity Corridor, created in 2003. The conservation unit is supported by the Amazon Region Protected Areas Program. Its Management Plan was published on March 10, 2010.

== Geography ==
Tumucumaque Mountains National Park has an area of more than 38,800 square kilometres (14,980 sq mi), making it the world's largest tropical forest national park and larger than Belgium. This area even reaches 59,000 square kilometres (22,780 sq mi) when including the bordering Guiana Amazonian Park, a national park in French Guiana. This combination of protected areas is still smaller than the three national parks system in the Brazil-Venezuelan border, where the Parima-Tapirapeco, Serranía de la Neblina and Pico da Neblina national parks have a combined area of over 73,000 square kilometres (28,190 sq mi).

But the latter is certainly smaller if the Tumucumaque Mountains National Park (Brazil) and the adjacent Guiana Amazonian Park (France) is combined with large neighbouring protected areas in northern Pará, Brazil, such as Grão-Pará Ecological Station, Maicuru Biological Reserve, and many others. The importance is that this makes the Guiana Shield one of the best protected and largest ecological corridor of tropical rainforests in the world. It is an uninhabited (Note: The villages of Vila Brasil and Ilha Bela are inside the park, and are home to an estimated 600 people in 2019.) region and is of high ecological value: most of its animal species, mainly fish and aquatic birds, are not found in any other place in the world. It is a habitat for jaguars, primates, aquatic turtles, and harpy eagles.

The highest point of the Brazilian state of Amapá is located there, reaching 701 meters.

=== Climate ===
The climate is tropical monsoon (Köppen: Am), common in areas of northern Brazil in transition from biomes to the Amazon Forest. It has an average temperature of 25 °C (77 °F) and accumulated rainfall ranging from 2,000 (78.84 in) to 3,250 mm (127.95 in) per year.

Climate data for Tumucumaque Mountains National Park (border with Suriname), elevation: 325 m or 1,066 ft, 1961-1990 normals and extremes
Month	Jan	Feb	Mar	Apr	May	Jun	Jul	Aug	Sep	Oct	Nov	Dec	Year
Mean daily maximum °C (°F)	29.0 (84.2)	28.8 (83.8)	29.2 (84.6)	29.4 (84.9)	29.5 (85.1)	29.6 (85.3)	29.9 (85.8)	30.8 (87.4)	31.7 (89.1)	32.2 (90.0)	31.6 (88.9)	30.3 (86.5)	30.2 (86.3)
Daily mean °C (°F)	24.2 (75.6)	24.1 (75.4)	24.3 (75.7)	24.5 (76.1)	24.5 (76.1)	24.4 (75.9)	24.4 (75.9)	24.7 (76.5)	25.2 (77.4)	25.8 (78.4)	25.7 (78.3)	25.0 (77.0)	24.7 (76.5)
Mean daily minimum °C (°F)	20.7 (69.3)	20.8 (69.4)	21.0 (69.8)	21.4 (70.5)	21.3 (70.3)	21.0 (69.8)	20.7 (69.3)	20.6 (69.1)	20.4 (68.7)	20.9 (69.6)	21.0 (69.8)	21.0 (69.8)	20.9 (69.6)
Average precipitation mm (inches)	111.2 (4.38)	116.3 (4.58)	168.1 (6.62)	226.7 (8.93)	348.5 (13.72)	231.1 (9.10)	189.4 (7.46)	105.8 (4.17)	76.9 (3.03)	38.4 (1.51)	43.8 (1.72)	75.9 (2.99)	1,732.1 (68.21)
Average relative humidity (%)	84.0	84.0	85.0	85.0	87.0	85.0	85.0	82.0	76.0	74.0	75.0	79.0	81.8
Mean monthly sunshine hours	121.7	109.6	112.0	104.0	129.7	165.8	171.5	207.3	218.9	220.4	199.4	163.8	1,924.1
Source: NOAA

== Tourism ==
Tourism in the Park takes place in two different sectors: Amapari Sector and Oiapoque Sector.

At Amaparí Sector, the Park is accessed by Serra do Navio city (most common) or by a community in Pedra Branca do Amapari (usually in the summer). The trip is made by the Amapari River, using aluminum boats (90 km from Serra do Navio) to the park's rustic base, where it is possible to stay in a camping structure adapted to Amazonian conditions (hammocks) and do activities such as trails, bathing in rivers and animal and plants watching.

At Oiapoque Sector, you can camp at Cachoeira do Anotaie, which is located on the Anotaie River, a tributary of the Oiapoque River. This waterfall is 40 km from the city of Oiapoque, on a trip using aluminum boats. There is also the possibility to visit Vila Brasil, a community located on the right bank of the Oiapoque River and located in front of the French-Guyanese indigenous community of Camopi. In this location there are small hotels and it is possible to understand its socio-cultural context, where the residents, mostly traders, provide services to the indigenous people of the neighboring country.

== Legacy ==
Mozilla Firefox code-named the beta of Firefox 4 Tumucumaque.

== Sources ==
- Corredor de Biodiversidade do Amapá Biodiversity Corridor (PDF), Belém: CI-Brasil, Governo do Amapá, Fundação Lee & Gund, 2007
- Full list: PAs supported by ARPA, ARPA
