= Camopi (river) =

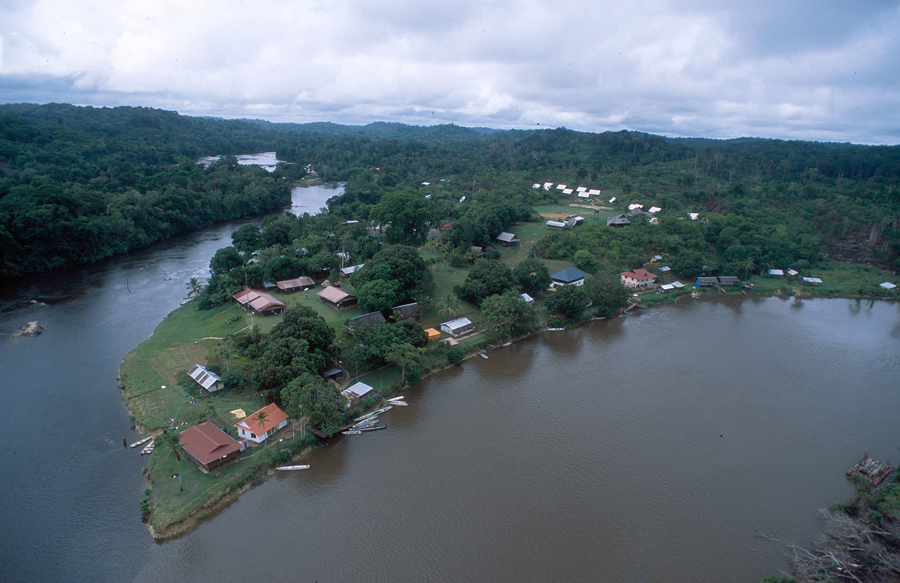

Location
- Country: French Guiana

Physical characteristics
- Source
  - location: French Guiana
  - coordinates: 2.3406°N 53.311°W
- Mouth
  - location: Oyapock
  - coordinates: 3°10′15″N 52°19′53″W
- Length: 244 km (152 mi)

Basin features
- Progression: Oyapock→ Atlantic Ocean

The Camopi (French pronunciation: [kamɔpi]) is a 244 kilometres (152 mi) long river in French Guiana. It rises in the south of the country, flowing northeast until it reaches the river Oyapock at the town of Camopi, on the border with Brazil.
