= Camopi =

Commune in French Guiana, France

- Commune
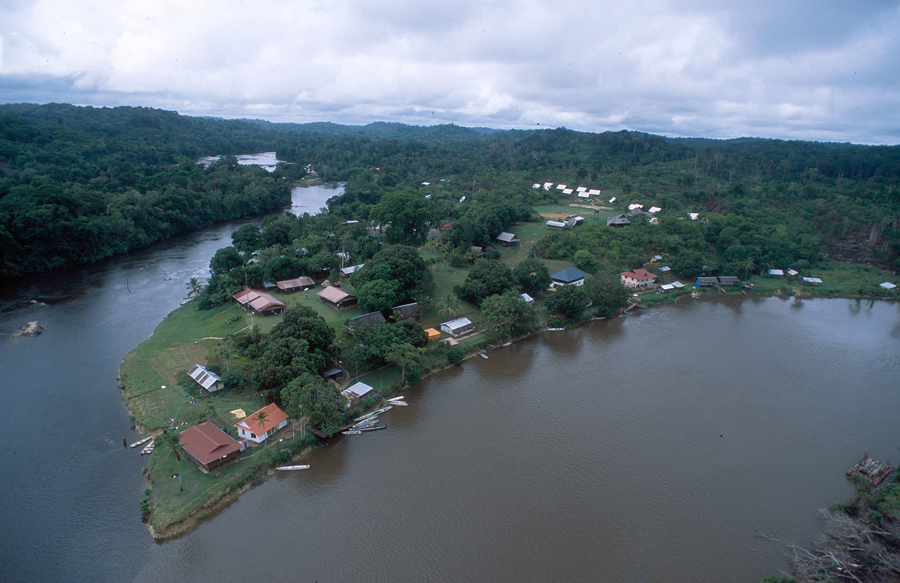
- Aerial view of Camopi

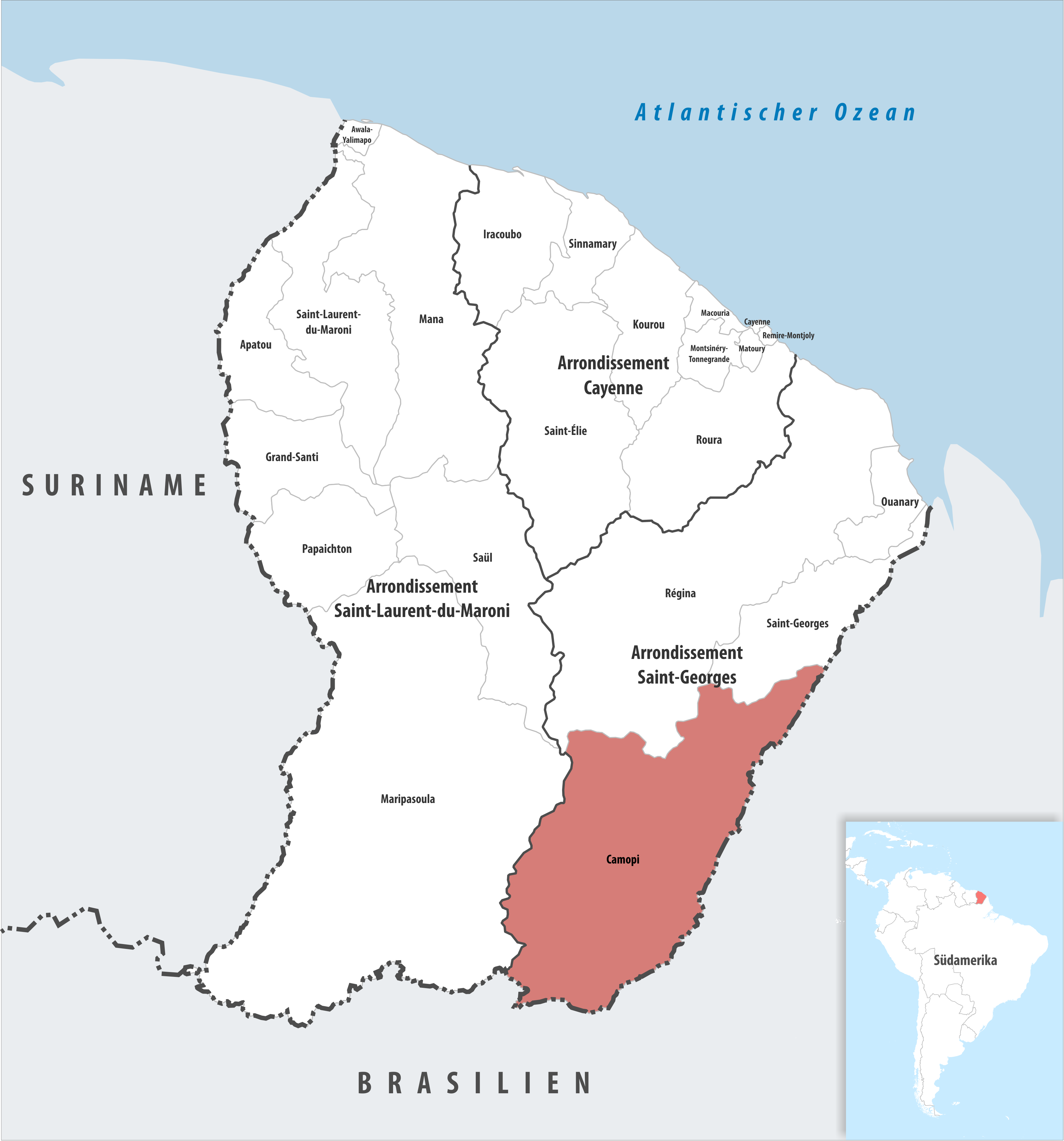
- Location of the commune (in red) within French Guiana
- Location of Camopi
- Location within France
- Coordinates: 3°09′56″N 52°20′28″W
- Country: France
- Overseas region and department: French Guiana
- Arrondissement: Saint-Georges
- Intercommunality: Est Guyanais

Government
  - Mayor (2020–2026): Laurent Yawalou
- Area^{1}: 10,030 km^{2} (3,870 sq mi)
- Population (2023): 2,189
  - Density: 0.2182/km^{2} (0.5653/sq mi)
- Time zone: UTC−03:00
- INSEE/Postal code: 97356 /97330
- ^{1} French Land Register data, which excludes lakes, ponds, glaciers > 1 km^{2} (0.386 sq mi or 247 acres) and river estuaries.

Camopi (French pronunciation: [kamɔpi]; French Guianese Creole: Kanmopi) is a commune of French Guiana, an overseas region and department of France located in South America. Camopi is mainly inhabited by Amerindians of the Wayampi and Teko tribes.

== History ==
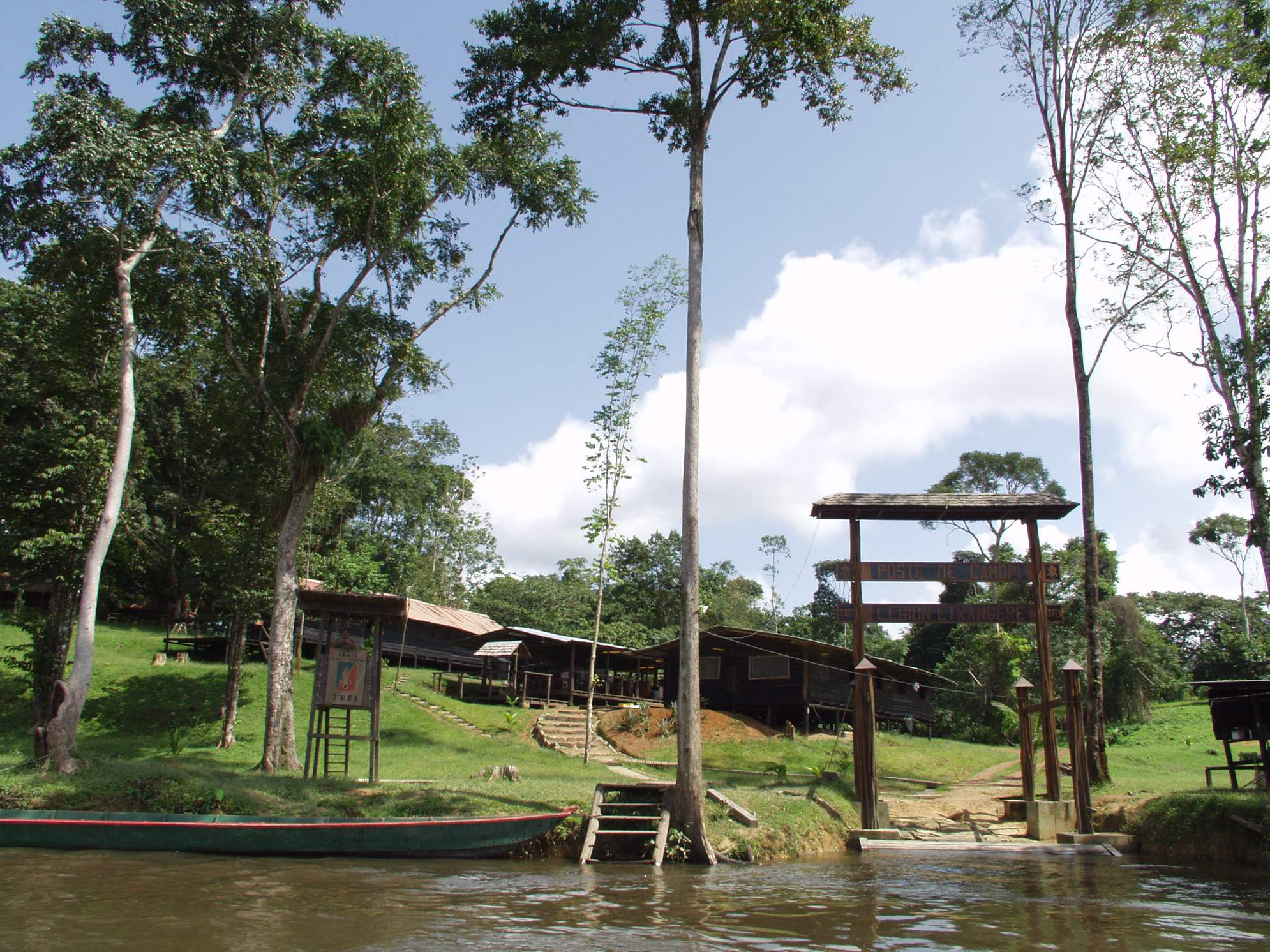
Entrance to the Camopi encampment of the 3rd Foreign Infantry Regiment.

In 1738, a Jesuit mission opened on the river Oyapock near the current town of Camopi. The missionaries brought European diseases and caused a depopulation. In 1763, the Jesuits left and most of the population dispersed.

During the 18th and 19th century, the Teko had moved into the area which had been home to the Wayampi, and by the 1830s, their territories overlap, however the tribes remained isolated. In 1930s, France and Brazil renewed their interest in the area, and wanted to establish borders. Medical facilities were established in the mid-1950s followed by a school. In the 1960s attempts were made to group the population into bigger villages with limited success. A granman (paramount chief) was installed according to the Maroon hierarchy, but failed to catch on.

In 1969, the town of Camopi was established. Parts of the tribes rejected the modernisations, and in 1970 access to the commune had been restricted. In 1987, Jacques Chirac as Prime Minister had established Zones of Collective Use Rights (ZDUC). ZDUC means that the villages have communal land for hunting, fishing, agriculture and gathering.

In the late 1980s, gold had been discovered around the river Camopi. Illegal gold miners have moved into area, and villages of Vila Brasil and Ilha Bela had been established opposite the town of Camopi on the other side of the river Oyapock. The 3rd Foreign Infantry Regiment has set up a camp to protect the border. Even though Vila Brasil had been built illegally in a nature reserve, Brazil designated Vila Brasil as a district of the municipality in 2011. In 2013, the access to the village of Camopi was no longer restricted, and the town had slowly opened for tourism. The southern village cluster of Trois Sauts still requires a special permit from the Prefecture. In the early 21st century, the Amerindians started to build hamlets with subsistence farms several kilometres from the town of Camopi. By 2010, there were 45 hamlets, and most had left the main town.

== Geography ==
With a land area of 10,030 km^{2} (3,870 sq mi), it is the third-largest commune of France.

The village of Camopi, seat of the commune, lies on the border with Brazil at the confluence of the rivers Camopi and Oyapock. The commune can only be reached by boat or via the air. It is served by Camopi Airport.

Mont Itoupé, the second highest mountain of French Guiana, is located within the commune.

=== Climate ===
Camopi has a tropical monsoon climate (Köppen climate classification Am). The average annual temperature in Camopi is 27.2 °C (81.0 °F). The average annual rainfall is 2,696.5 mm (106.16 in) with May as the wettest month. The temperatures are highest on average in October, at around 28.6 °C (83.5 °F), and lowest in February, at around 26.4 °C (79.5 °F). The highest temperature ever recorded in Camopi was 38.5 °C (101.3 °F) on 30 October 2018; the coldest temperature ever recorded was 16.8 °C (62.2 °F) on 14 September 1978.

Climate data for Camopi (1991–2020 averages, extremes 1955−present)
Month	Jan	Feb	Mar	Apr	May	Jun	Jul	Aug	Sep	Oct	Nov	Dec	Year
Record high °C (°F)	35.5 (95.9)	35.3 (95.5)	36.1 (97.0)	35.5 (95.9)	36.9 (98.4)	35.6 (96.1)	35.9 (96.6)	37.0 (98.6)	37.8 (100.0)	38.5 (101.3)	38.2 (100.8)	37.0 (98.6)	38.5 (101.3)
Mean daily maximum °C (°F)	30.7 (87.3)	30.4 (86.7)	30.9 (87.6)	31.0 (87.8)	30.7 (87.3)	31.2 (88.2)	31.7 (89.1)	32.9 (91.2)	34.1 (93.4)	35.0 (95.0)	34.3 (93.7)	32.1 (89.8)	32.1 (89.8)
Daily mean °C (°F)	26.6 (79.9)	26.4 (79.5)	26.7 (80.1)	27.0 (80.6)	26.8 (80.2)	26.9 (80.4)	26.8 (80.2)	27.4 (81.3)	28.0 (82.4)	28.6 (83.5)	28.4 (83.1)	27.3 (81.1)	27.2 (81.0)
Mean daily minimum °C (°F)	22.5 (72.5)	22.5 (72.5)	22.6 (72.7)	22.9 (73.2)	23.0 (73.4)	22.4 (72.3)	21.9 (71.4)	22.0 (71.6)	22.0 (71.6)	22.1 (71.8)	22.4 (72.3)	22.6 (72.7)	22.4 (72.3)
Record low °C (°F)	18.0 (64.4)	18.3 (64.9)	18.0 (64.4)	18.9 (66.0)	17.5 (63.5)	17.5 (63.5)	18.6 (65.5)	18.0 (64.4)	16.8 (62.2)	18.0 (64.4)	18.0 (64.4)	18.0 (64.4)	16.8 (62.2)
Average precipitation mm (inches)	313.1 (12.33)	311.5 (12.26)	310.0 (12.20)	388.1 (15.28)	384.0 (15.12)	264.8 (10.43)	190.8 (7.51)	109.9 (4.33)	46.6 (1.83)	56.9 (2.24)	86.0 (3.39)	234.8 (9.24)	2,696.5 (106.16)
Average precipitation days (≥ 1.0 mm)	24.4	21.9	23.0	24.1	25.9	23.3	19.8	12.3	6.8	6.7	10.7	20.5	219.5
Source: Météo-France

== Villages ==
- Alikoto Tapele
- Trois Sauts

== Population ==
Historical population
Year	Pop.	±% p.a.
1968	276	—
1975	399	+5.41%
1982	554	+4.80%
1990	748	+3.82%
1999	1,032	+3.64%
2007	1,469	+4.51%
2012	1,665	+2.54%
2017	1,805	+1.63%
2023	2,189	+3.27%
Source: INSEE

== See also ==
- Communes of French Guiana
- List of French communes by surface area

== Bibliography ==
- Davy, Damien; Tritsch, Isabelle (2012). "Construction et restructuration territoriale chez les Wayãpi et Teko de la commune de Camopi, Guyane française". Research Gate (in French).
