= Oyapock =

River in French Guiana and Ampa, Brazil

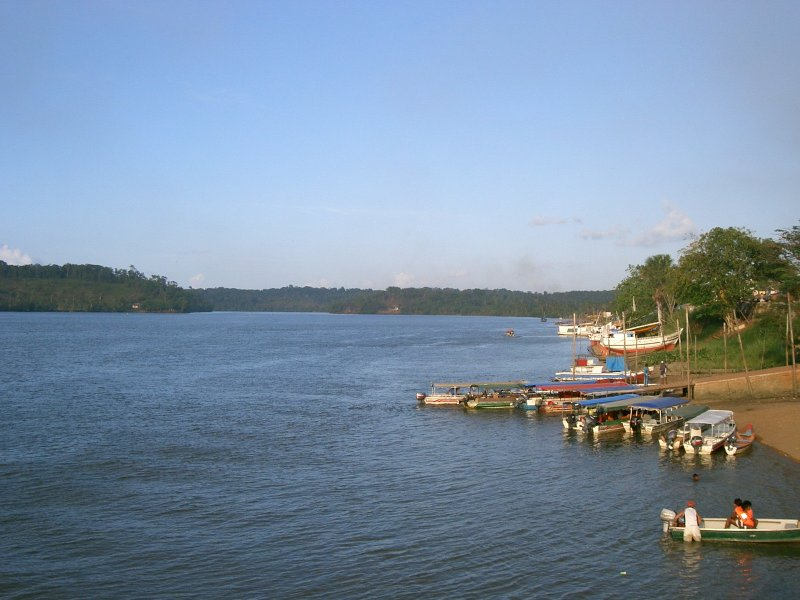
- View of the Oyapock River from Brazil toward French Guiana

- Guyane Oyapock River map

Location
- Countries: Brazil and France

Physical characteristics
- Source
  - location: Tumuk Humak Mountains
- Mouth
  - location: Atlantic Ocean
  - coordinates: 04°14′08″N 51°36′53″W
- Length: 403 km (250 mi)
- Basin size: 30,869 km^{2} (11,919 mi^{2})
- Discharge
  - location: Near mouth
  - average: 1,457 m^{3}/s (51,500 cu ft/s)

Basin features
- Bridges: Oyapock River Bridge

The Oyapock or Oiapoque (Note: /ˈɔɪ.əpɒk, ˌɔɪ.əˈpoʊki/ OY-ə-pok, OY-ə-POH-kee; French: Fleuve Oyapock [flœv ojapɔk]; Portuguese: Rio Oiapoque [ˈʁi.u ojaˈpɔki]) is a 403-kilometre (250 mi) long river in South America that forms most of the border between the French overseas department of French Guiana and the Brazilian state of Amapá.

== Course ==
The Oyapock runs through the Guianan moist forests ecoregion. It rises in the Tumuk Humak (Portuguese: Tumucumaque) mountain range and flows into the Atlantic Ocean, where its estuary forms a large bay bordering on Cape Orange.

The mouth of the Oyapock is the northern end of Brazil's coastline, as it is where the border between Brazil and French Guiana meets the ocean, but nearby Cape Orange, which separates the Bay of Oyapock from the Atlantic Ocean, is the northernmost point of the Brazilian coast. In Brazil, both the cape and the mouth of the Oyapock are often mistaken for the whole country's northernmost point (rather than just of its coastline), and in the past this information could even be found in geography schoolbooks. Yet the true northernmost point in Brazil is actually far inland, on Monte Caburaí, in the state of Roraima, hundreds of kilometers from the Oyapock and almost a full degree more to the north.

== History ==
Vicente Yáñez Pinzón was said to be the first European person to see the Oiapoque River in the first years of the 16th century. It has been rendered Japoc, Yapoc, Iapoco, Wiapoco, and even called the Vicente Pinzón River. Early European colonists referred to the river as the Wiapoco, and it was the site of early settlements by the Englishman Robert Harcourt in 1608 and the Dutchman Jan van Ryen in 1627. The name Oiapoque has been officially used from 1900, when a territorial dispute between Brazil and France was resolved through Swiss diplomatic arbitration.

== Settlements ==
In addition to the small towns of Oiapoque (Amapá) and Saint-Georges de l'Oyapock (French Guiana), there are some small villages scattered along the bank of the Oyapock, such as Camopi and Clevelândia do Norte.

== Bridge ==
The Oyapock River Bridge has been built across the river to connect the Brazilian town of Oiapoque and the French town of Saint-Georges-de-l'Oyapock. It is the first international land border connection of French Guiana; although completed since 2011, as of February 2017, it had remained closed to traffic due to payment delays for construction and building crews, staffing issues within the Brazilian customs facilities, plus some minor disagreements between the Brazilian and French governments. The inauguration ceremony of the bridge finally took place on 18 March 2017. Starting from 08:00 on 20 March 2017, the bridge has been open to members of the public.

== In popular culture ==
The widespread Brazilian Portuguese expression "do Oiapoque ao Chuí" ("from the Oyapock to the Chuí [rivers]") is used to refer to the whole nation, by mentioning the waterways that mark respectively the northern and southern extremities of the Brazilian coastline (as noted above, they are often mistaken for the entire country's northern and southern extreme points). Thus, the saying is used in the same way as Americans use the expression "from coast to coast." 'Oyapok' is a Micronation on TikTok based around this area.

== See also ==
- Rings of Chariklo, one of which is named "Oiapoque" after the river.
- List of rivers of French Guiana
- List of rivers of the Americas by coastline
