= Kawemhakan =

Kawemhakan Anapaikë
- Location in Suriname
- Coordinates: 3°24′42″N 54°01′33″W
- Country: Suriname
- District: Sipaliwini District
- Resort (municipality): Tapanahony

Government
  - Head captain: Ipomadi Pelenapïn
  - Captain: Dosu
- Elevation: 112 m (366 ft)

Population (2020)
  - Total: 200

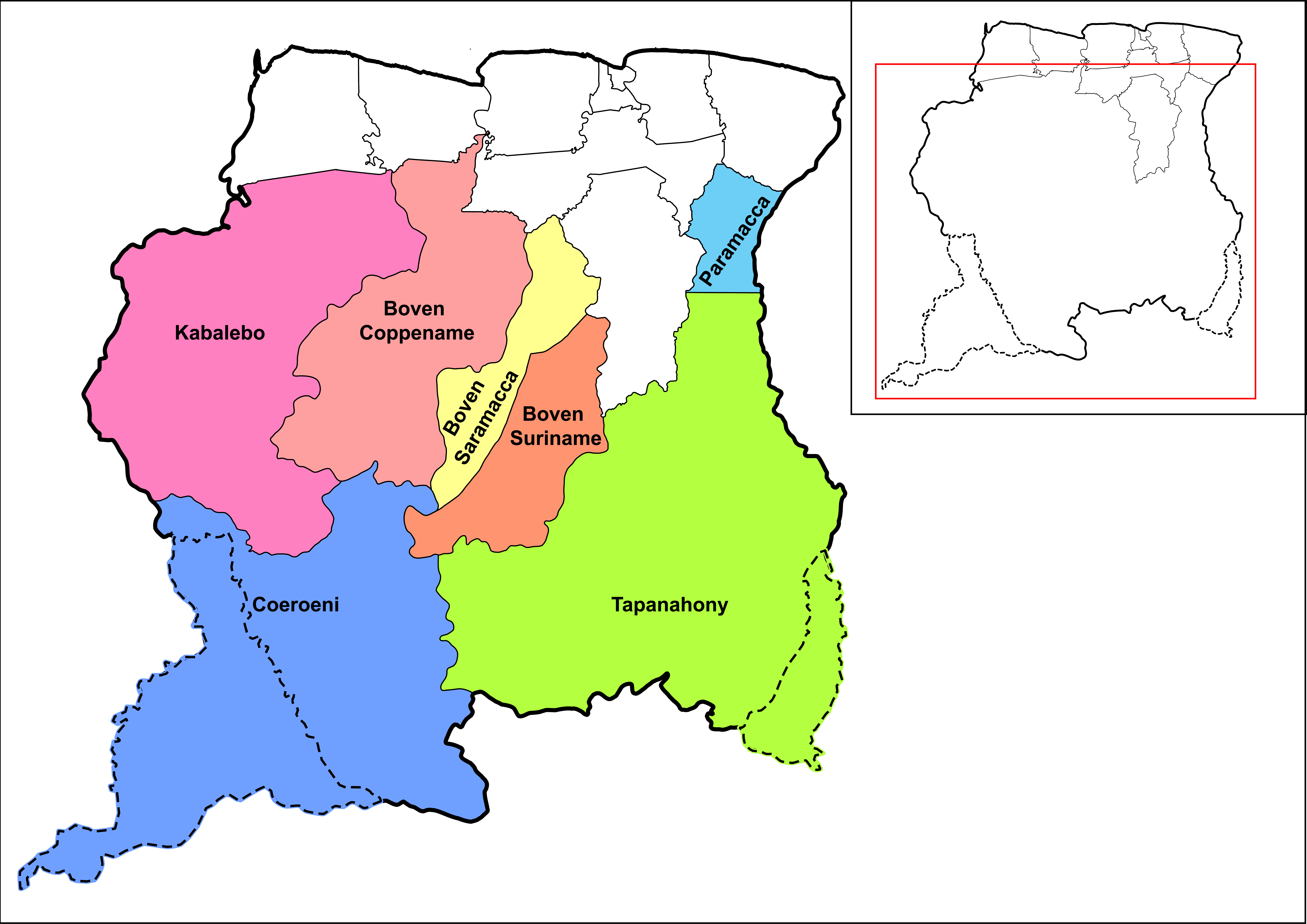

Kawemhakan, formerly also known as Anapaikë, is a Wayana village in the Sipaliwini District of Suriname. The village lies on the banks of the Lawa River, which forms the border with French Guiana.

== Name ==
The indigenous name of the village is Kawemhakan, which translates to "high riverbank" in the Wayana language. The village is also known by the name Anapaikë, which is the name of the late granman of the Wayana in Suriname, who died end july 2002. The Baptist missionaries called the village Lawa Station, and many Wayana still refer to the village as "Lawa".

== History ==
Historical population
Year	Pop.	±% p.a.
1969	359	—
1991	157	−3.69%
1993	169	+3.75%
2006	82	−5.41%
2020	200	+6.58%
Source: Boven 2006, pp. 128–129 (1969–1993); Heemskerk et al. 2007, p. 21 (2006)

Kawemhakan was founded in 1958, primarily by people who lived in the village of the local chief Janomalë, which was situated further upstream the Lawa River. It was common practice by Wayana to relocate to another village after the death of a chief, but Janomalë's death coincided with the arrival of Baptist missionaries to the area. Both the American missionaries and the Surinamese government wanted to concentrate the Wayana in a central location, as that would make their missionary and development efforts easier. At the instigation of the Baptist missionaries, Anapaikë was installed by the Surinamese government as the first granman of the Wayana.

Kawemhakan soon flourished as the main Wayana village in Suriname. The Surinamese government built a modern prefabricated Bruynzeel house for Anapaikë, with amenities such as a toilet, a shower and a kitchen, which were considered very modern by the Wayana in the 1960s. An airstrip was built to provide transport to Paramaribo and a clinic was established to provide basic healthcare.

During the COVID-19 pandemic in Suriname, the border to French Guiana was closed. The locally-based Mulokot Foundation under Jupta Itoewaki organised supply flights from other parts of Suriname instead.

== Education ==
In the early 1970s, a primary school was built in Kawemhakan. This school closed its doors at the start of the Surinamese Interior War, and was only temporarily reopened in the early 1990s as part of an international emergency aid package. After the emergency aid expired, the teachers left Kawemhakan again, and children from Kawemhakan have been going to the French school in Talhuwen ever since. Schoolchildren of Kawemhakan and Kumakahpan are transported to Talhuwen every school day by boat.

== Healthcare ==
Kawemhakan is home to a Medische Zending healthcare centre, which in 1968 took over the provision of basic healthcare services from the Baptist missionaries. The clinic was funded by Dutch NGO Simavi and Surinamese businesses.

== Geography ==
Kawemhakan lies about 4.5 km (2.8 mi) downstream the Lawa River from the villages of Kulumuli, Taluwen, Epoja and Alawataimë enï, and 6.5 km (4.0 mi) upstream the Lawa River from the village of Élahé, which both lie on the east bank of the river and hence are in French Guiana.

== Transport ==
=== By air ===
Kawemhakan is served by Lawa Anapaike Airstrip, offering scheduled services to and from Paramaribo.

== Communications ==
Since August 2016, a telecommunications and broadcasting tower is operational in Kawemhakan, offering ATSC broadcasts of STVS and ATV television networks, as well as GSM coverage on the Telesur network.

== Notable people ==
- Jupta Itoewaki (1988), Wayana activist and politician.
