= Maluwana =

Traditional cultural artifact

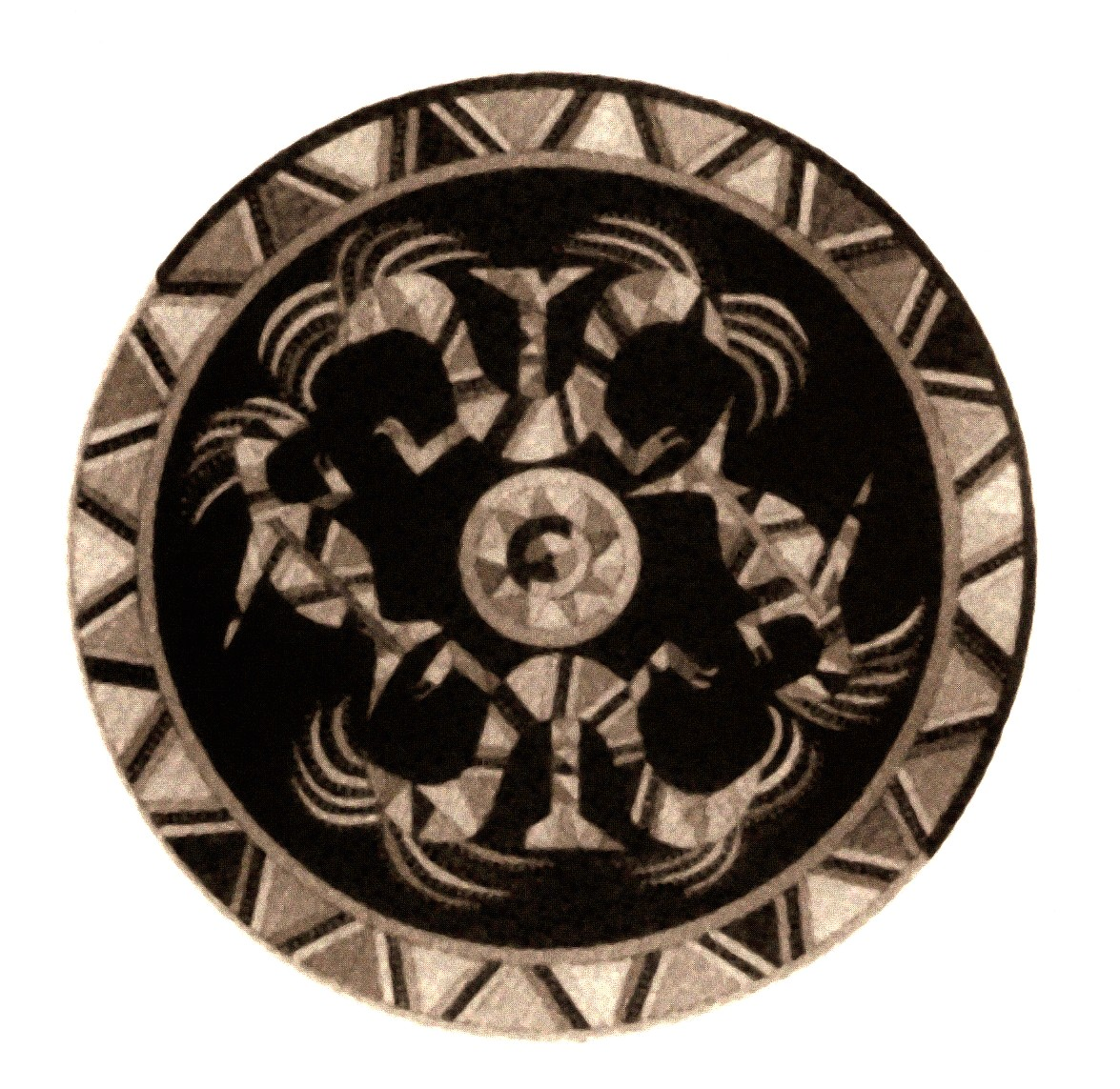
A maluwana

A maluwana or maluana is a decorated wooden disc that forms the centre point of a tukusipan, a traditional community house of the Wayana and Aparai Native American peoples, who can be found in Guyana, Suriname and Brazil.

Maluwanas are made from the wood of the Ceiba tree C. pentandra, also known as the silk-cotton tree. The name means "house sky" in the Wayana language.

The motifs of the maluwana are traditional, and represent evil animal spirits enclosed by a liminal border. They were traditionally painted using colored clay, but are now painted using acrylic paints or an admixture of colored clay and superglue.

The appropriation of maluwana imagery for commercial purposes is controversial.
