= List of rivers of French Guiana =

This is a list of rivers in French Guiana.

== By drainage basin ==
This list is arranged by drainage basin, with respective tributaries indented under each larger stream's name.

=== Atlantic Ocean ===
- Oyapock
  - Camopi
  - Yaloupi
- Approuague
  - Arataï
- Mahury (Oyak, Comté)
  - Orapu
- Rivière de Cayenne (Rivière des Cascades)
  - Tonnegrande
  - Montsinéry
- Kourou
- Sinnamary
  - Koursibo
- Counamama
- Iracoubo
- Mana
  - Kokioko
  - Arouani
- Maroni
  - Lawa
    - Grand Abounami
    - Inini
    - Tampok
      - Waki (Ouaqui)
    - Litani
    - Malani (Marouini)
      - Wanapi

== See also ==
- List of rivers of the Americas by coastline
