= Jupta Itoewaki =

Surinamese indigenous activist and politician

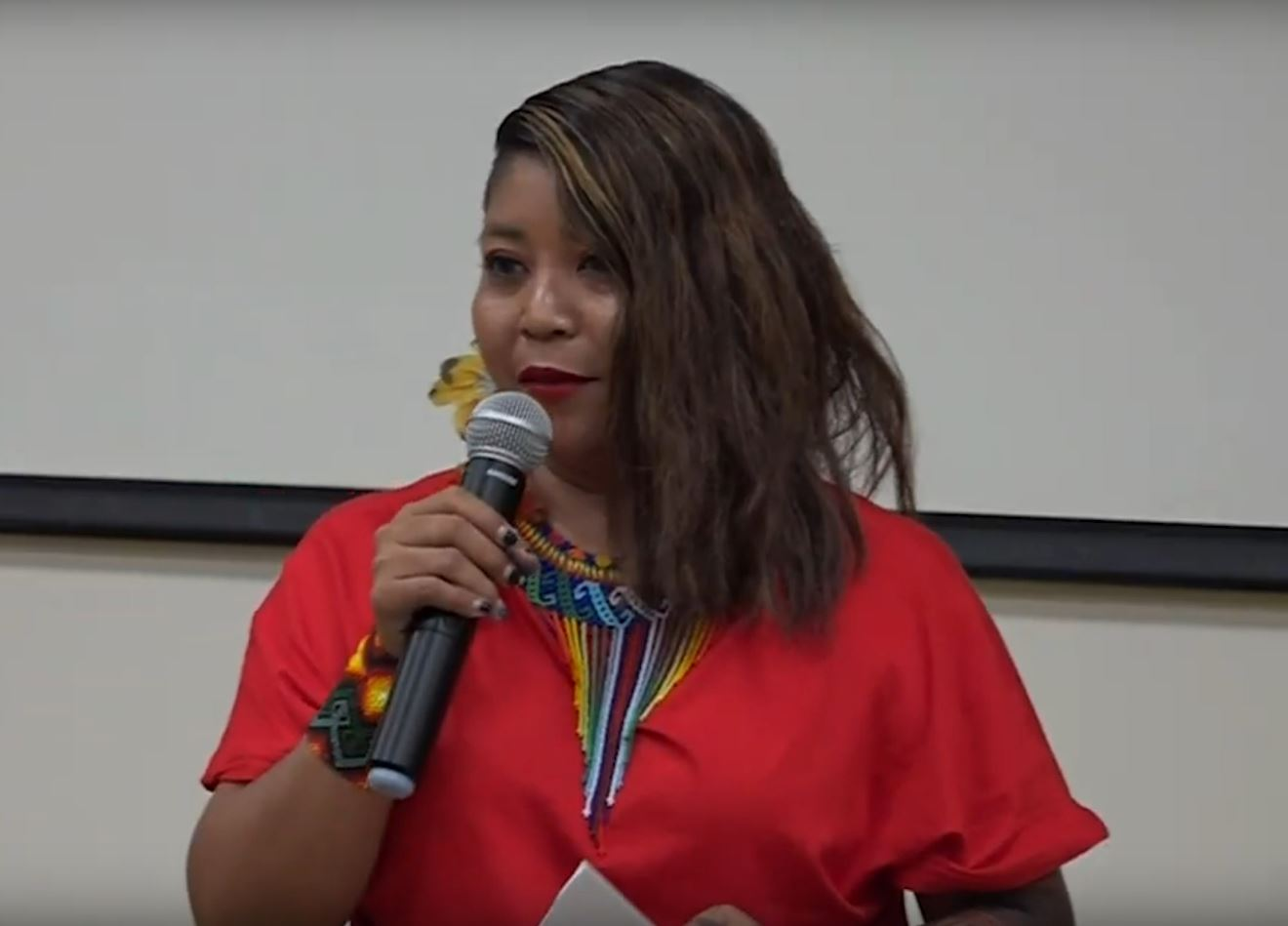
- Jupta Itoewaki, 2022

Personal details
- Born: Jupta Lilian Itoewaki; 18 February 1988 (age 38) Kawemhakan, Sipaliwini, Suriname
- Party: Amazon Party Suriname (APS)
- Occupation: Activist, politician

Jupta Lilian Itoewaki (born 18 February 1988) is a Wayana activist and politician from Suriname. Since 2018, she has been the founding president of Mulokot, an organisation representing the interests of the Wayana people. She had previously worked from 2010 with groups focused on preserving the culture and habitat of indigenous Surinamese.

Itoewaki is a member of the Amazon Party Suriname (APS). During the 2020 elections, she was the lead candidate on the APS list for Sipaliwini District.

== Biography ==
Itoewaki was born in Kawemhakan and partly grew up there. She attended Algemene Middelbare School, and began working as a self-employed Wayana language interpreter in 2010. She also worked for the Suriname office of the Amazon Conservation Team from 2010 to 2013. Since 2017, she has worked on projects of the Association of Indigenous Village Leaders Suriname (VIDS).

In April 2018, with the support of Wayana Chief (Granman) Ipomadi Pelenapin, Itoewaki founded the Mulokot Foundation to represent the Wayana people and became its president. A few months later, on the recommendation of the VIDS, she was accepted into a course in Geneva at the Office of the United Nations High Commissioner for Human Rights (OHCHR). Here she received training on human rights in general as well as in the context of indigenous people: fundamental rights, self-determination, prior and informed consent, legal protection mechanisms and traditional knowledge. This month-long training coincided with the annual meeting of the UN Expert Mechanism on the Rights of Indigenous Peoples (EMRIP).

Itoewaki represented her people at several protest events: in February 2019, in front of the Royal Torarica hotel in Paramaribo when the government hosted a climate conference; and in April 2019, in front of the United Nations Permanent Forum on Indigenous Issues (UNPFII) in New York City. On both occasions, she would shine a hand in front of her mouth. She was able to give a speech to the UNPFII. In November 2019, she gave a presentation at the International Conference for Population and Development (ICPD) in Nairobi, Kenya.

In April 2019, Itoewaki organized several five-day meetings (krutus) in Kawemhakan, Apetina, and Paloemeu, with the goal of developing a common vision for Wayana communities. In 2020, authorities in French Guiana closed the border with Suriname due to the COVID-19 pandemic, cutting off the Wayana villagers from their customary trading posts in Maripasoula. Due to the lack of road connections with urban Suriname, Itoewaki organised flights of food and medical supplies through Mulokot for all Wayana villages.

In February 2020, Itoewaki and environmentalist Loes Trustfull were co-recipients of the Golden Gavel Award. This award has been given by the Politically Active Women Platform foundation since 2016 to female leaders in the struggle to protect the environment.

Itoewaki is a member of the Amazon Party Suriname (APS). For the 2020 elections, she was the lead candidate on the APS list for Sipaliwini District. Her party did not win any seats.
