= André Cognat =

French Guianese chief (1938–2021)

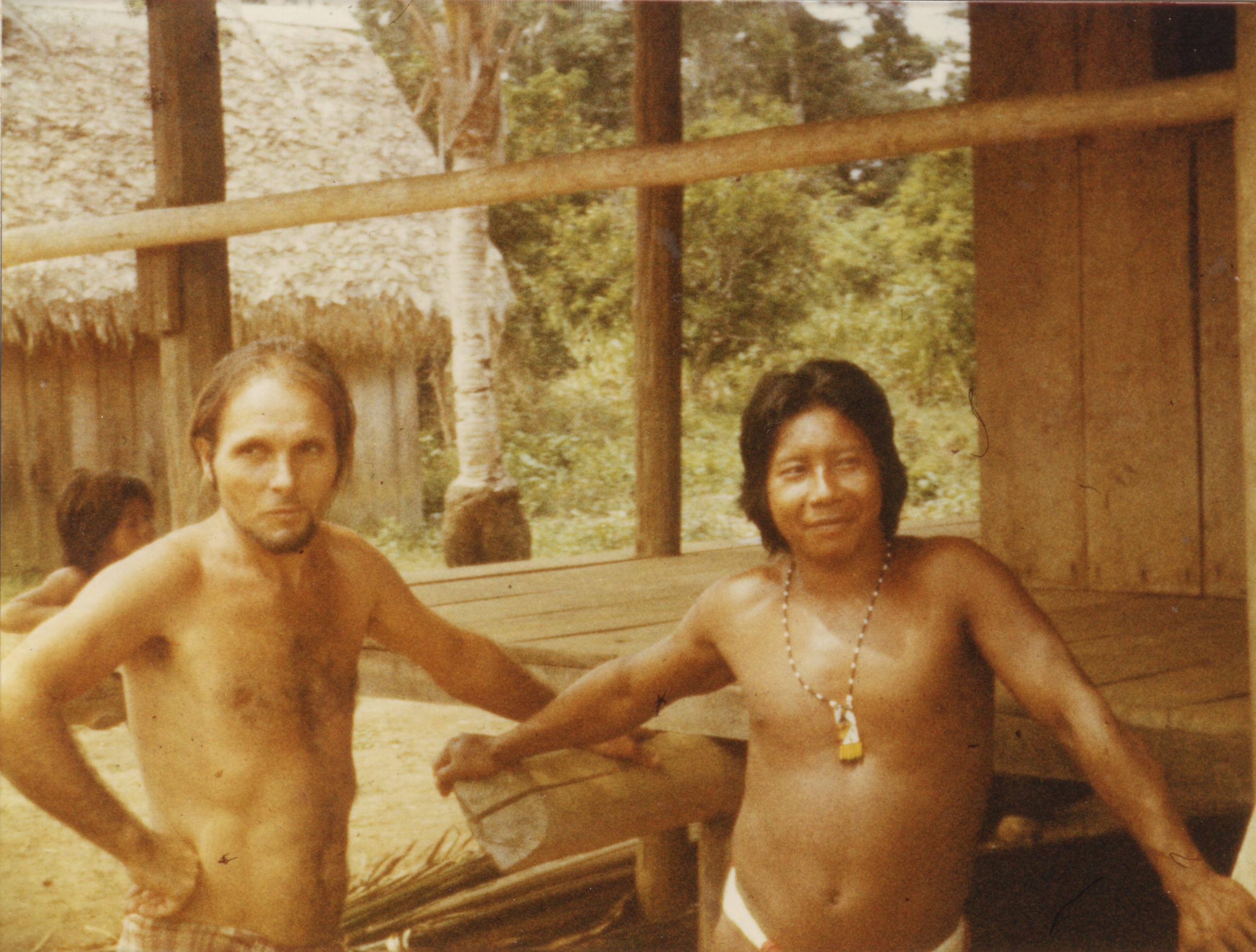
- Cognat (left) in 1979
- Born: 21 February 1938; Pierre-Bénite, Metropolitan Lyon, France
- Died: 15 October 2021 (aged 83); Antécume-Pata, French Guiana, France
- Occupations: Tribal chief, memoirist

André Cognat, also known as Antecume, (21 February 1938 – 15 October 2021) was the French Guianese chief of a Wayana tribe in Antécume-Pata, French Guiana, France.

== Early life ==
André Cognat was born on 21 February 1938 in Pierre-Bénite near Lyon, in metropolitan France.

== Adult life ==
Cognat moved to French Guiana in 1961, at the age of 23. His boat capsized on the Litani near Maripasoula, and he was rescued by a Wayana from the Amazonia. Cognat decided to stay there, and he married a Wayana woman called Alasawani in 1973; they had a son and a daughter. By 1985, he had taken the name of Antecume. He also founded a new settlement called Antécume-Pata, and he became the chief of the local Wayana tribe.

Cognat founded Yepe, a non-profit organization to protect the rights of the Wayanas, in 1990. In particular, he had interceded for them in Cayenne to retain their access to water against Brazilian gold dredgers.

Cognat is the author of two memoirs about his life as a tribal chief.

== Death ==
Cognat died on 15 October 2021 at the age of 83 at his home in Antécume-Pata, French Guiana, France.

== Works ==
- Cognat, André (1988). Antecume ou une autre vie. Paris: Robert Laffont. ISBN 9782221012604. OCLC 743077769.
- Cognat, André (1995). J'ai choisi d'être indien. Paris: Éditions L'Harmattan. ISBN 9782738405845. OCLC 634356286.
