= Talhuwen =

- Location in French Guiana
- Coordinates: 3°22′54″N 54°03′01″W
- Country: France
- Overseas region: French Guiana
- Arrondissement: Saint-Laurent-du-Maroni
- Commune: Maripasoula

Government
  - Chief: Kawet Sintaman

Population (2009)
  - Total: 110

Talhuwen, also spelt as Taluwen, Taluhen and Taluen, is a Wayana village situated on the Lawa River in French Guiana.

== Education ==
Talhuwen features the only primary school in the immediate vicinity. Children from the villages of Kawemhakan and Kumakahpan, which both lie on the other side of the river in Suriname, are transported every day by boat to the school.

The school in Talhuwen was inaugurated in 1991 as an annex to the school in Kulumuli, which itself was established in 1973 by the French teacher Jean-Paul Klingelhofer. The school was extended in 2004.

== Geography ==
Talhuwen lies opposite the island on which Kulumuli is situated and has on the landside merged with the villages of Epoja and Alawataimë enï. In the 1990s, a village by the name of Esperance was founded between Talhuwen and Epoja by Wayana migrating from Suriname.
