= Kayodé =

- Location in French Guiana
- Coordinates: 3°23′23″N 53°55′29″W
- Country: France
- Overseas region: French Guiana
- Arrondissement: Saint-Laurent-du-Maroni
- Commune: Maripasoula

Population (2020)
  - Total: circa 350

Kayodé or Cayodé is a Teko and Wayana village on the Tampok River in French Guiana.

The Tampok River is heavily polluted by illegal gold mining, causing adverse affects among the Kayodé population which uses the river for fishing and bathing.

== Education ==
A primary school opened in Kayodé in 1988, which was extended in 1997.
