= Palasisi =

Palasisi Mapahpan
- Location in French Guiana
- Coordinates: 3°17′27″N 54°5′1″W
- Country: France
- Overseas region: French Guiana
- Arrondissement: Saint-Laurent-du-Maroni
- Commune: Maripasoula

Population (2009)
  - Total: 15

Palasisi, also named Mapahpan or Palassisi, is a Wayana village on an island in the Litani River. The village was founded by Wayanas who emigrated from Brazil.

== Name ==
Palasisi means "white man" in the Wayana language and is usually reserved for the French. Wapahpan means "place of the Wapa tree".

== Geography ==
Palasisi lies about 700 m (2,300 ft) downstream the Litani River from the village of Pëleya and 1.5 km (0.93 mi) upstream the Litani River from the village of Antécume-Pata.
