= Tedamali =

Tedamali Telamali
- Location in French Guiana
- Coordinates: 3°39′6″N 54°0′28″W
- Country: France
- Overseas region: French Guiana
- Arrondissement: Saint-Laurent-du-Maroni
- Commune: Maripasoula

Population (2009)
  - Total: c. 100

Tedamali, also known as Telamali, is a Wayana village on the Lawa River in French Guiana.

== Geography ==
Tedamali lies about 2.5 kilometres (1.6 mi) upstream the Lawa river from Maripasoula.

== Notable people ==
- Wayana Boy, a musician whose real name is David Khana, lives in Tedamali.
