= Kumakahpan =

- Location in Suriname
- Coordinates: 3°21′40″N 54°3′31″W
- Country: Suriname
- District: Sipaliwini District
- Resort (municipality): Tapanahony

Government
  - Basya: Anita Alijana

Population (2020)
  - Total: 27

Kumakahpan is a Wayana village in the Sipaliwini District of Suriname. The village lies on the banks of the Lawa River, which forms the border with French Guiana.

== Name ==
Kumakahpan means "place of the kumakah". Kumakah and Kankantri are local names for Ceiba pentandra, the kapok tree.

== Geography ==
Kumakahpan lies about 7 km (4.3 mi) downstream the Lawa River from the village of Antécume-Pata and 5.5 km (3.4 mi) upstream the Lawa River from the villages of Kulumuli and Pïleike.
