= Aparai people =

Ethnic group

Apalai
Total population
- 564

Regions with significant populations
- Brazil (Amapá, Pará): 514 (2014)
- French Guiana: 40 (2011)
- Suriname: 10 (2011)

Languages
- Aparai, Wayana, Portuguese

Religion
- traditional tribal religion

The Aparai or Apalai are an Indigenous people of Brazil, who live in Amapá and Pará states. A little community is located in French Guiana, in Antécume-Pata. They were sedentary slash-and-burn farmers, necessitating periodic relocation as soil became exhausted, but also hunters and gatherers. They spoke a Carib language and in the 20th century their subsistence shifted towards craftwork as they adapted to modern Brazil and the cash economy.

== Name ==
The tribe calls themselves Aparai. They have been known by Apalai, Appirois, Aparathy, Apareilles, Apalaii, Aparis and Apalaís.

== Language ==
Most Aparai people are multi-lingual, and many speak Aparai, Wayana, Portuguese, and Tiriyó, as well as Wajãpi, Aluku, and Criollo. The Aparai language is one of the Karib languages.

== Population ==
In 1993, they numbered 450, and in 2014, there are 564 Apalai people. They usually live with the Wayana. The main group lives along the East Paru River in Brazil within Tumucumaque Indigenous Park and the East Paru Indigenous Land. A small group lives along the Maroni River in French Guiana. An even smaller group lives along the Tapanahoni River in Suriname.

Most settlements are small except for Aldeia Bona which was founded by FUNAI to concentrate the population of the Apalaí and Wayana. There are 18 settlements.

- Aldeia Bona, Pará
- Antécume-Pata, French Guiana
- Missão Tiriyó, Pará
- Paloemeu, Suriname
- Suisuimënë, Pará
- Twenkë, French Guiana
