= Geography of French Guiana =

Coordinates: 4°00′N 53°00′W

French Guiana is an overseas region of France, located on the northern coast of South America between Suriname and Brazil. The country is part of Caribbean South America and borders the North Atlantic Ocean. It has low-lying plains with small mountains to the south. Its climate is split between tropical rainforest and tropical monsoon.

French Guiana is situated on the northeast coast of South America between 2° and 5° latitude north and covers an area of 90,999 km^{2} (35,135 square miles). It is separated from Surinam (Dutch Guiana) by the Maroni River and two of its tributaries, the Aoua and Itany, in the west, and from Brazil by the Tumuc Humac Mountains in the south and the Oyapock River in the east. Its 320-km (200-mile) Atlantic coastline is bordered by several rocky islands – the Îles du Salut (Devil's Island, Royale and Saint-Joseph), the Père and Mère Islands, Malingre Island and Rémire Island, and the two Connétables—which are all part of French Guiana.

== Statistics ==
=== Area ===
Land: 83,534 km^{2}

=== Land boundaries ===
Total: 1,183 km
Border countries: Brazil 673 km, Suriname 510 km (disputed)
Coastline: 378 km

=== Maritime claims ===
Exclusive economic zone: 200 nmi (370.4 km; 230.2 mi) territorial sea: 12 nmi (22.2 km; 13.8 mi).

=== Land cover ===
Primary Forest: 95%

=== Natural resources ===
Bauxite, timber, gold (widely scattered), cinnabar, kaolin, fish, shrimp, rice, bananas.

Köppen climate classification map of French Guiana.

== Climate ==
French Guiana's climate is tropical and hot with a Köppen climate classification of tropical rainforest (Af) throughout most of the country. Heavy showers, severe thunderstorms, and floodings are frequent, as is intense heat and humidity.

Although French Guiana is very close to the equator, the trade winds which blow almost the year round refresh the coastal region and prevent the formation of great tropical storms. The annual mean temperature on the coast is 80 °F (27 °C). There are two principal seasons: "summer" from July to December and the "rainy season" the rest of the year, broken only by a Short "March Summer."

Climate data for Cayenne (Köppen Am/Af)
Month	Jan	Feb	Mar	Apr	May	Jun	Jul	Aug	Sep	Oct	Nov	Dec	Year
Record high °C (°F)	32.5 (90.5)	32.3 (90.1)	32.2 (90.0)	33.0 (91.4)	33.2 (91.8)	33.7 (92.7)	34.5 (94.1)	35.0 (95.0)	35.2 (95.4)	35.1 (95.2)	34.6 (94.3)	34.1 (93.4)	35.2 (95.4)
Mean daily maximum °C (°F)	29.1 (84.4)	29.2 (84.6)	29.6 (85.3)	29.9 (85.8)	29.9 (85.8)	30.2 (86.4)	30.8 (87.4)	31.6 (88.9)	32.1 (89.8)	32.2 (90.0)	31.5 (88.7)	30.1 (86.2)	30.5 (86.9)
Daily mean °C (°F)	26.2 (79.2)	26.3 (79.3)	26.5 (79.7)	26.8 (80.2)	26.7 (80.1)	26.6 (79.9)	26.6 (79.9)	27.0 (80.6)	27.2 (81.0)	27.3 (81.1)	27.0 (80.6)	26.6 (79.9)	26.7 (80.1)
Mean daily minimum °C (°F)	23.3 (73.9)	23.4 (74.1)	23.5 (74.3)	23.7 (74.7)	23.5 (74.3)	22.9 (73.2)	22.4 (72.3)	22.4 (72.3)	22.2 (72.0)	22.3 (72.1)	22.5 (72.5)	23.1 (73.6)	22.9 (73.2)
Record low °C (°F)	17.4 (63.3)	18.9 (66.0)	18.5 (65.3)	19.0 (66.2)	18.8 (65.8)	18.9 (66.0)	19.0 (66.2)	19.0 (66.2)	18.7 (65.7)	18.6 (65.5)	17.2 (63.0)	18.0 (64.4)	17.2 (63.0)
Average rainfall mm (inches)	451.2 (17.76)	309.4 (12.18)	334.3 (13.16)	448.4 (17.65)	579.4 (22.81)	411.4 (16.20)	245.7 (9.67)	143.6 (5.65)	55.7 (2.19)	63.3 (2.49)	133.4 (5.25)	340.5 (13.41)	3,516.3 (138.44)
Average rainy days (≥ 1.0 mm)	23.6	20.0	20.7	22.2	26.4	25.2	20.6	14.2	7.1	7.6	11.9	21.6	221.1
Average relative humidity (%)	82	80	82	84	85	82	78	74	71	71	76	81	79
Mean monthly sunshine hours	95.1	92.4	120.0	123.5	122.4	150.4	200.5	234.4	253.4	256.4	211.5	143.3	2,003
Source: Meteo France

== Tree cover extent and loss ==
Global Forest Watch publishes annual estimates of tree cover loss and 2000 tree cover extent derived from time-series analysis of Landsat satellite imagery in the Global Forest Change dataset. In this framework, tree cover refers to vegetation taller than 5 m (including natural forests and tree plantations), and tree cover loss is defined as the complete removal of tree cover canopy for a given year, regardless of cause.

For French Guiana, country statistics report cumulative tree cover loss of 91,912 ha (919.12 km^{2}) from 2001 to 2024 (about 1.1% of its 2000 tree cover area). For tree cover density greater than 30%, country statistics report a 2000 tree cover extent of 8,162,754 ha (81,627.54 km^{2}). The charts and table below display this data. In simple terms, the annual loss number is the area where tree cover disappeared in that year, and the extent number shows what remains of the 2000 tree cover baseline after subtracting cumulative loss. Forest regrowth is not included in the dataset.

Annual tree cover loss in French Guiana, 2001–2024. View chart definition.
Tree cover extent in 2000 minus cumulative tree cover loss in French Guiana, 2001–2024 (loss-only residual; does not account for gain). View chart definition.

Annual tree cover extent and loss
Year	Tree cover extent (km2) (Note: This residual measure does not include forest regrowth.)	Annual tree cover loss (km2)
2001	81,597.21	30.33
2002	81,572.24	24.97
2003	81,553.35	18.89
2004	81,505.31	48.04
2005	81,476.90	28.41
2006	81,451.55	25.35
2007	81,418.26	33.29
2008	81,366.03	52.23
2009	81,337.41	28.62
2010	81,305.36	32.05
2011	81,278.26	27.10
2012	81,180.53	97.73
2013	81,150.85	29.68
2014	81,108.90	41.95
2015	81,080.22	28.68
2016	81,018.95	61.27
2017	80,977.49	41.46
2018	80,940.11	37.38
2019	80,907.12	32.99
2020	80,864.24	42.88
2021	80,842.19	22.05
2022	80,803.79	38.40
2023	80,753.35	50.44
2024	80,708.42	44.93

== Terrain ==
French Guiana extends almost 400 km (250 miles) into the continent and is divided into two natural zones: a small, low, swampy coastal area called the "Terres Basses," varying from 16 to 48 km in width, and a granite peneplain called the "Terres Hautes," worn down by erosion into steps forming a series of low steep hills. Almost the entire country is covered by rain forest and its many large rivers and streams, although their courses are broken by rapids, constitute the only natural means of penetration into the interior. The main rivers, flowing in a general south–north direction, are the Maroni, the Mana, the Iracoubo, the Sinnamary, the Kourou, the Mahury, the Approuague and the Oyapock.

== Extreme Points ==
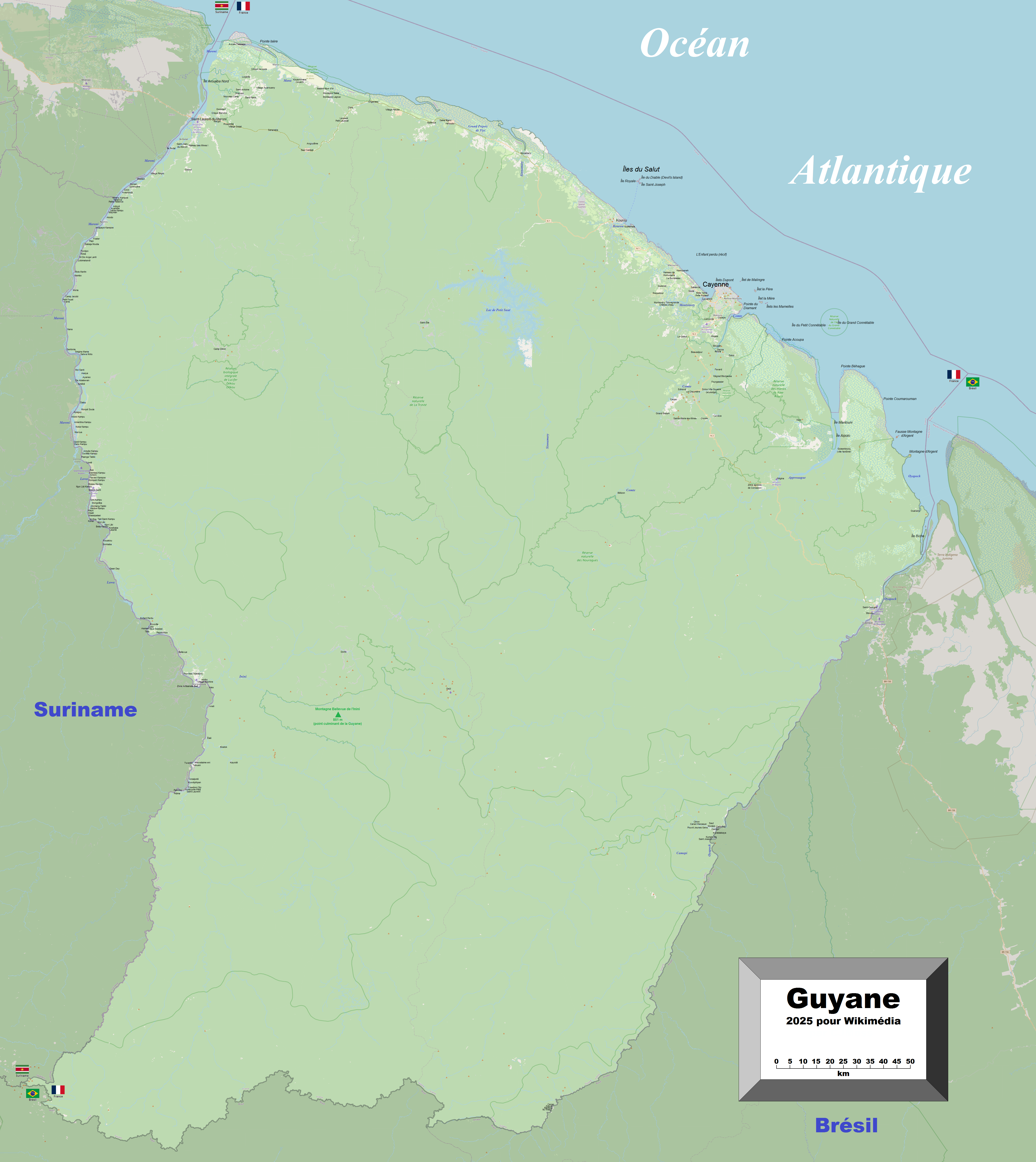
Detailed map of French Guiana

- Northernmost point – Pointe Isère
- Southernmost point – border with Brazil, Maripasoula
- Westernmost point – disputed, see France–Suriname relations
  - assuming France's claim: tripoint with Suriname and Brazil, Maripasoula
  - assuming Suriname's claim: point on Maroni, Apatou
- Easternmost point – mouth of Oyapock, Saint-Georges commune (but near the village of Ouanary)
- Highest point – Bellevue de l'Inini: 851 m
- Lowest point – Atlantic Ocean: 0 m

== See also ==
- Geography of Suriname
- Guiana Shield
