= Élahé =

Élahé Malipahpan
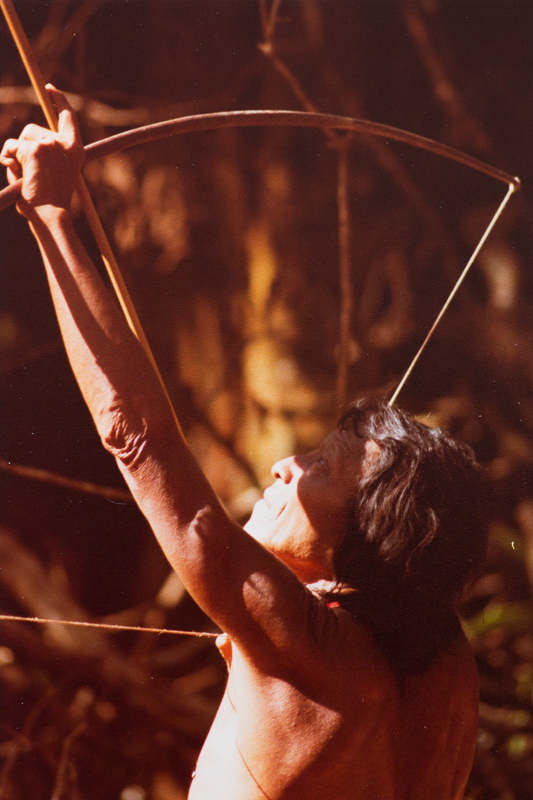
- Wayana Village

- Location in French Guiana
- Coordinates: 3°27′54″N 54°00′17″W
- Country: France
- Overseas region: French Guiana
- Arrondissement: Saint-Laurent-du-Maroni
- Commune: Maripasoula

Population (2016)
  - Total: 120

Élahé, also known by the names Malipahpan and Maripahpan, is a Wayana village on the Tampok River in French Guiana. A minority of Teko also live in the village.

== Education ==
A primary school opened in Élahé in 1985.

== Geography ==
Élahé is situated about 6.5 km (4.0 mi) downstream the Lawa River from the village of Kawemhakan, which lies on the west bank of the river and hence is in Suriname.
