= Pilima =

Pilima Pidima
- Location in French Guiana
- Coordinates: 3°17′11″N 54°6′35″W
- Country: France
- Overseas region: French Guiana
- Arrondissement: Saint-Laurent-du-Maroni
- Commune: Maripasoula

Population (2009)
  - Total: 40

Pilima, also known as Pidima, is a Wayana village situated on the Litani River in French Guiana.

== History ==
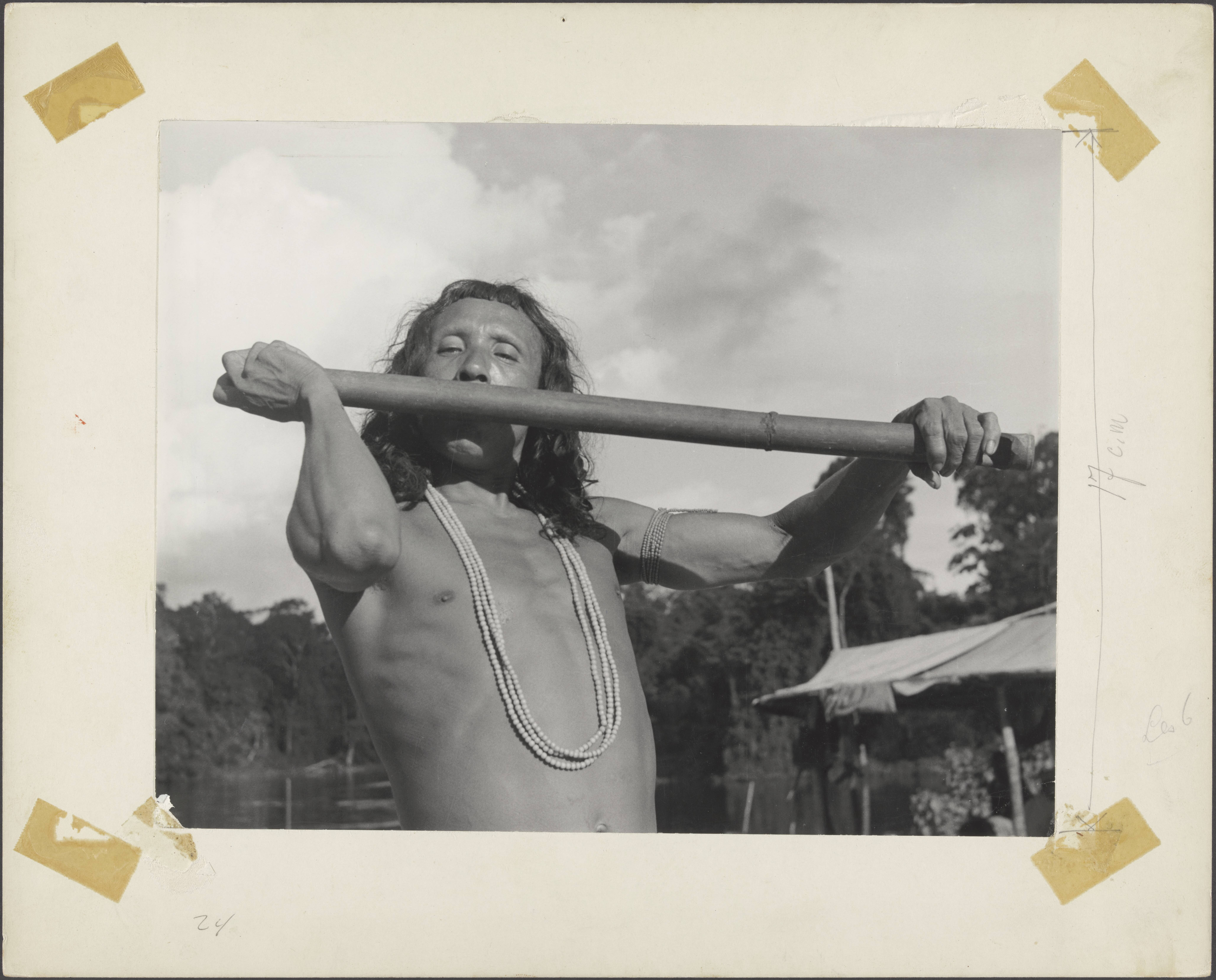
The Wayana prophet Pilima.

Pilima was founded by the shaman or pïyai Pilima, son of former head captain Janomalë. Pilima sometimes clashed with the new head captain of Kawemhakan, Anapaikë, who, according to Pilima, pandered too much to the wishes of the Baptist missionaries. As a reaction to the missionary activities, Pilima started a prophetic movement that had the characteristics of a syncretic Christian cult: Pilima claimed to be in contact with Aramawali, a great spirit from the heavens who would send "heaven boats" from the sky to gather the Wayana who believed in him, and who would bring them to heaven where they would live an eternal life. Pilima imitated church rites and attempted to sing songs during ceremonies. A central aspect of the cult was the jumping in the water from a springboard, in an apparent reference to Christian baptism, which, according to Pilima, would help the Wayana overcome their fears, which stood in the way of their salvation by Aramawali. The cult died out after a while, and Pilima and the village returned to their earlier lives.

== Education ==
A primary school opened in Pilima in 1997.

== Geography ==
Pilima is the southernmost of all Wayana villages currently inhabited on the Litani River. It lies about 2.5 km (1.6 mi) upstream of the village of Palimino.
