= Bellevue de l'Inini =

Mountain in French Guiana

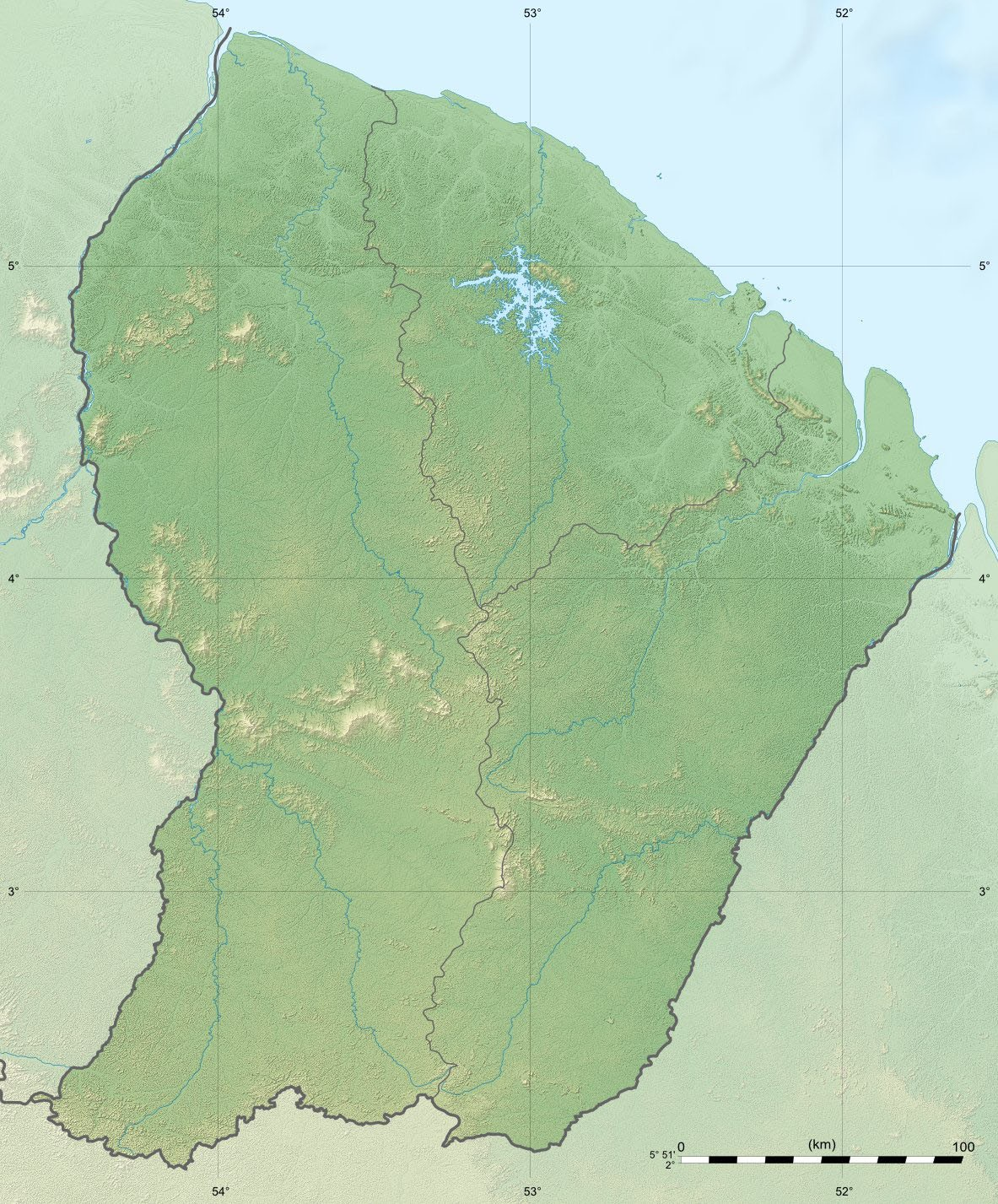
- Location within French Guiana

Highest point
- Elevation: 851 m (2,792 ft)
- Coordinates: 3°32′26″N 53°34′24″W

Geography
- Location: Maripasoula, French Guiana

Bellevue de l'Inini, also known as Mont Bellevue, Montagne Bellevue, and Montagne Bellevue de l'Inini, is the highest point of French Guiana, an overseas department of France, with an elevation of 851 metres (2,792 ft).

== See also ==
- Geography of French Guiana
