= Epoja =

Epoja Opoya
- Location in French Guiana
- Coordinates: 3°22′50″N 54°3′1″W
- Country: France
- Overseas region: French Guiana
- Arrondissement: Saint-Laurent-du-Maroni
- Commune: Maripasoula

Epoja, also known as Opoya, is a Wayana village situated on the Lawa River in French Guiana.

== Geography ==
Epoja is conjoined with the village of Taluwen and Alawataimë enï and lies clies to the island village of Kulumuli. In the 1990s, a village by the name of Esperance was founded by Wayana migrating from Suriname next to Epoja and Taluwen.
