= Counamama =

River in French Guiana

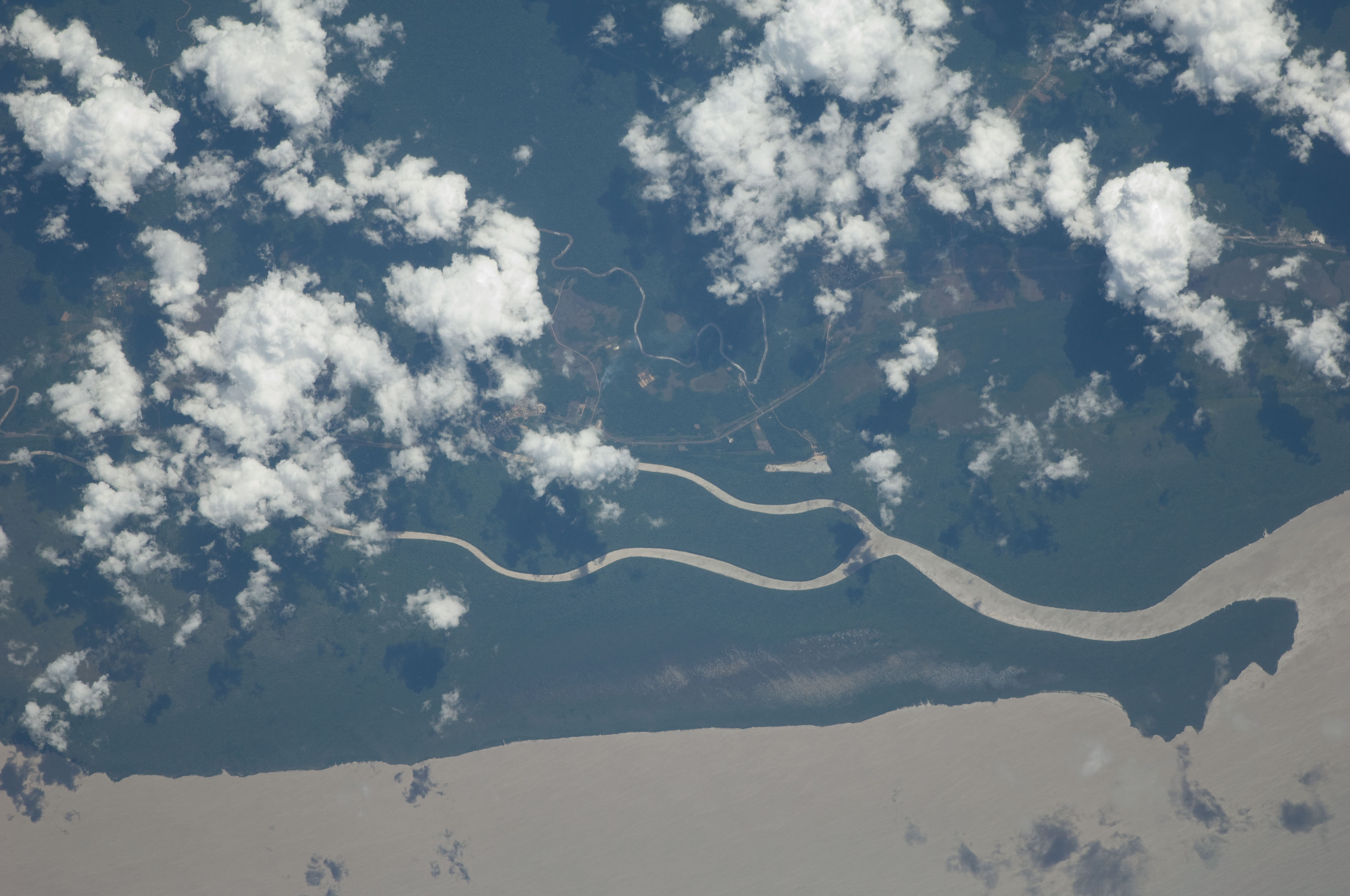

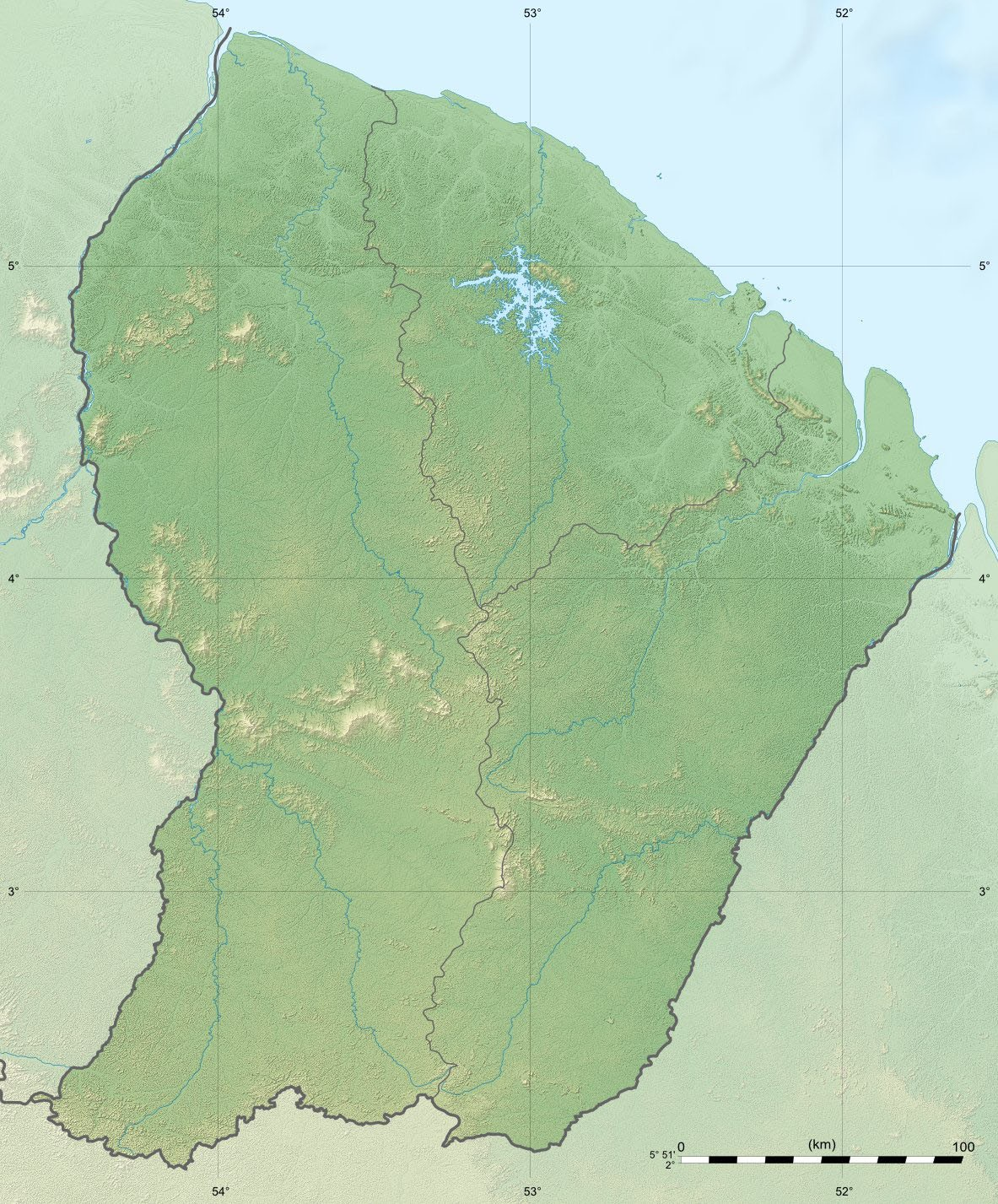
- Location of mouth
- Native name: La Counamama Rivière (French)

Location
- Country: France
- Territory: French Guiana
- Commune: Iracoubo

Physical characteristics
- Source
  - coordinates: 4.98111°N 53.34419°W
- Mouth: Atlantic Ocean
  - coordinates: 5.518678°N 53.246188°W
- Length: 106 km (66 mi)

Basin features
- Progression: Iracoubo River → Atlantic Ocean

Counamama is a river in French Guiana that has its source in the mountains in the south of the Iracoubo municipality. It passes the eponymous town, and flows into the Iracoubo River near the coast. The Iracoubo empties into the Atlantic Ocean 5 kilometres (3.1 mi) later. The Counamama is 106 kilometres (66 mi) long.

In 1598 the Counamama was first explored by De Zeeridder and described by Abraham Cabeliau.

== See also ==
- List of rivers of French Guiana
- List of rivers of the Americas by coastline
