= Pëleya =

Pëleya Péléa
- Location in French Guiana
- Coordinates: 3°17′34″N 54°5′22″W
- Country: France
- Overseas region: French Guiana
- Arrondissement: Saint-Laurent-du-Maroni
- Commune: Maripasoula

Pëleya, also spelt as Péléa, is a Wayana village on an island in the Litani River.

== Geography ==
Pëleya lies about 800 m (2,600 ft) downstream the Litani River from the village of Palimino and 700 m (2,300 ft) upstream the Litani River from the village of Palasisi.
