= Pïleike =

- Location in Suriname
- Coordinates: 3°23′13″N 54°3′11″W
- Country: Suriname
- District: Sipaliwini District
- Resort (municipality): Tapanahony

Population (2009)
  - Total: 0

Pïleike was a Wayana village in the Sipaliwini District of Suriname. The village lies across the Lawa River from the island village of Kulumuli, which is considered to lie in French Guiana. As of 2009, the village is abandoned.

== History ==
Pïleike was the village of the influential shaman or pïyai of the same name. When he died in the late 1990s, he ordered his fellow villagers to cross the river and join Kulumuli.
