= Suisuimënë =

Suisuimënë Xuixuimënë
- Location in Brazil Suisuimënë (Brazil)
- Coordinates: 0°51′12″N 54°38′46″W
- Country: Brazil
- State: Pará
- Municipality: Almeirim

Government
  - Chief: Jehje Wayana

Population (2018)
  - Total: 74

Suisuimënë or Xuixuimënë is an Apalaí-Wayana village on the Eastern Paru River in the state of Pará in Brazil. Suisuimënë is one of the larger villages along the Paru river and has an airstrip.

Jehje Wayana is the chief of the village.

Apart from its Apalaí-Wayana majority, the village also has a small Wayampi community.

== Geography ==
Suisuimënë lies about 23.5 kilometres (14.6 mi) downstream the Paru river from the village of Kurupohpano and about 37 kilometres (23 mi) upstream from the village of Jolokoman.

== Demographics ==
In June 2016, Suisuimënë had 69 inhabitants, of whom 41 were Wayana, 17 were Apalaí and 11 were Wayampi.
