= Kulumuli =

Kulumuli Twenkë
- Location in French Guiana
- Coordinates: 3°23′01″N 54°03′16″W
- Country: France
- Overseas region: French Guiana
- Arrondissement: Saint-Laurent-du-Maroni
- Commune: Maripasoula

Government
  - Granman: Amaipotï

Population (2009)
  - Total: 90

Kulumuli, also known by the name Twenkë, is a Wayana village situated on an island in the Lawa River in French Guiana. Kulumuli is the residence of the granman of the Wayana in French Guiana.

== Name ==
The indigenous name for the village is Kulumuli, which means reed. The alternative name Twenkë refers to the late chief of the village, who was installed as granman of the Wayana in French Guiana by the French authorities.

== History ==
Halfway through the twentieth century, Surinamese and French authorities tried to gain a firmer grip on the interior of Suriname and French Guiana, respectively. The indigenous inhabitants of the interior were registered in the civil registry of both colonies, and the Wayana, as inhabitants of the border between Suriname and French Guiana, were given the choice to register as either a Dutch or as a French subject. Twenkë chose the French side and founded a village on the right riverbank of the Lawa River. Twenkë was recognised by the French as the granman of the Lawa River. After his death, he was succeeded by his son Amaipotï.

In 1973, the Alsatian Jean-Paul Klingelhofer was sent by the French authorities to Kulumuli to establish a school and to work as a teacher. His wife Françoise would later start a nursery in the village.

== Geography ==
Kulumuli lies opposite the villages of Taluwen on the French east river bank and Pïleike on the Surinamese west river bank. Taluwen itself is conjoined with the village of Epoja. Pïleike was the village of shaman Pïleike. When he died in the late 1990s, he ordered his fellow villagers to cross the river and join Kulumuli.

Kulimuli lies about 10 km (6.2 mi) downstream the Lawa River from the village of Antécume-Pata and 4.5 km (2.8 mi) upstream the Lawa River from the village of Kawemhakan in Suriname.
