= Inini (river) =

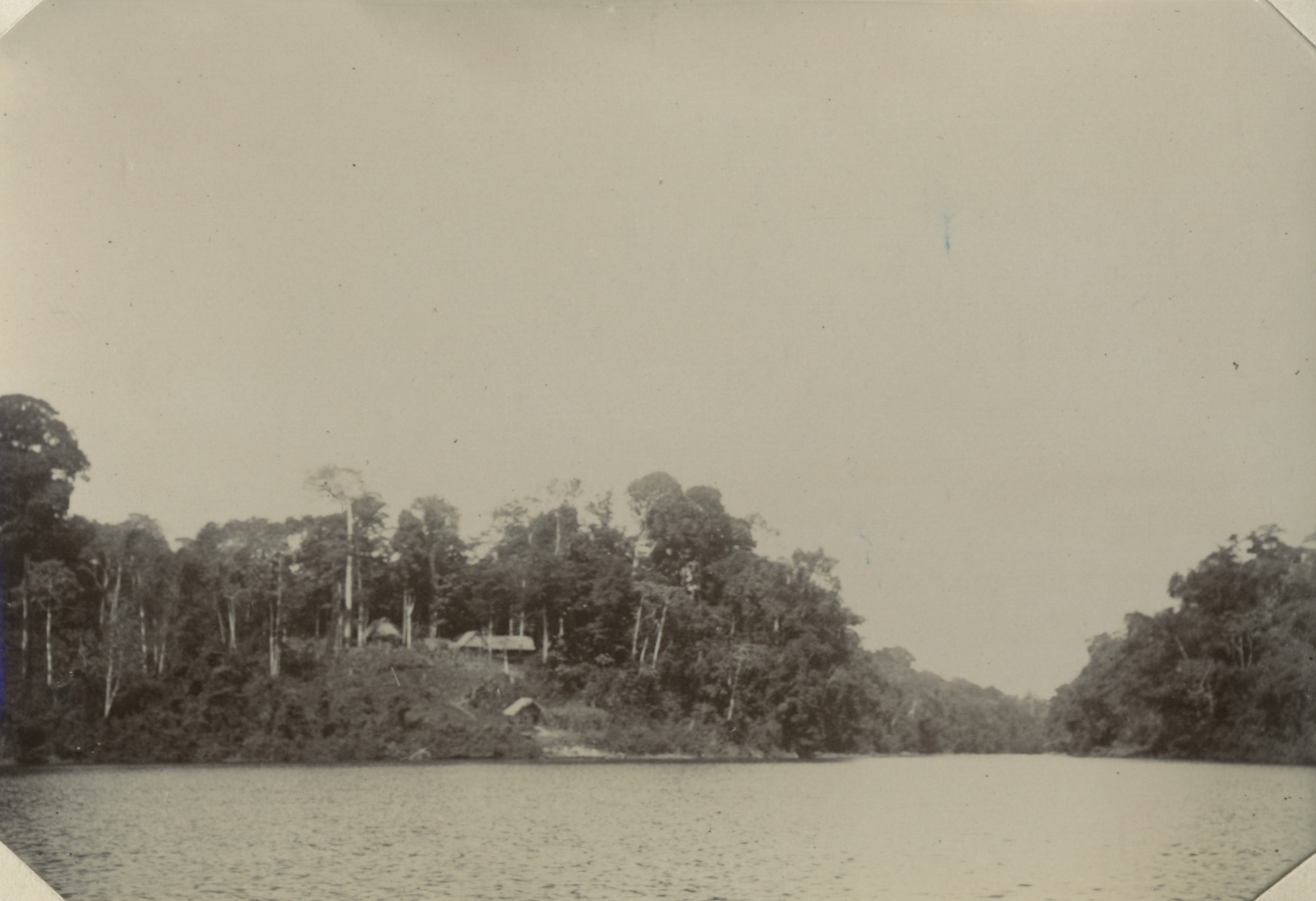
- Confluence of the Inini River with the Lawa River (1903)

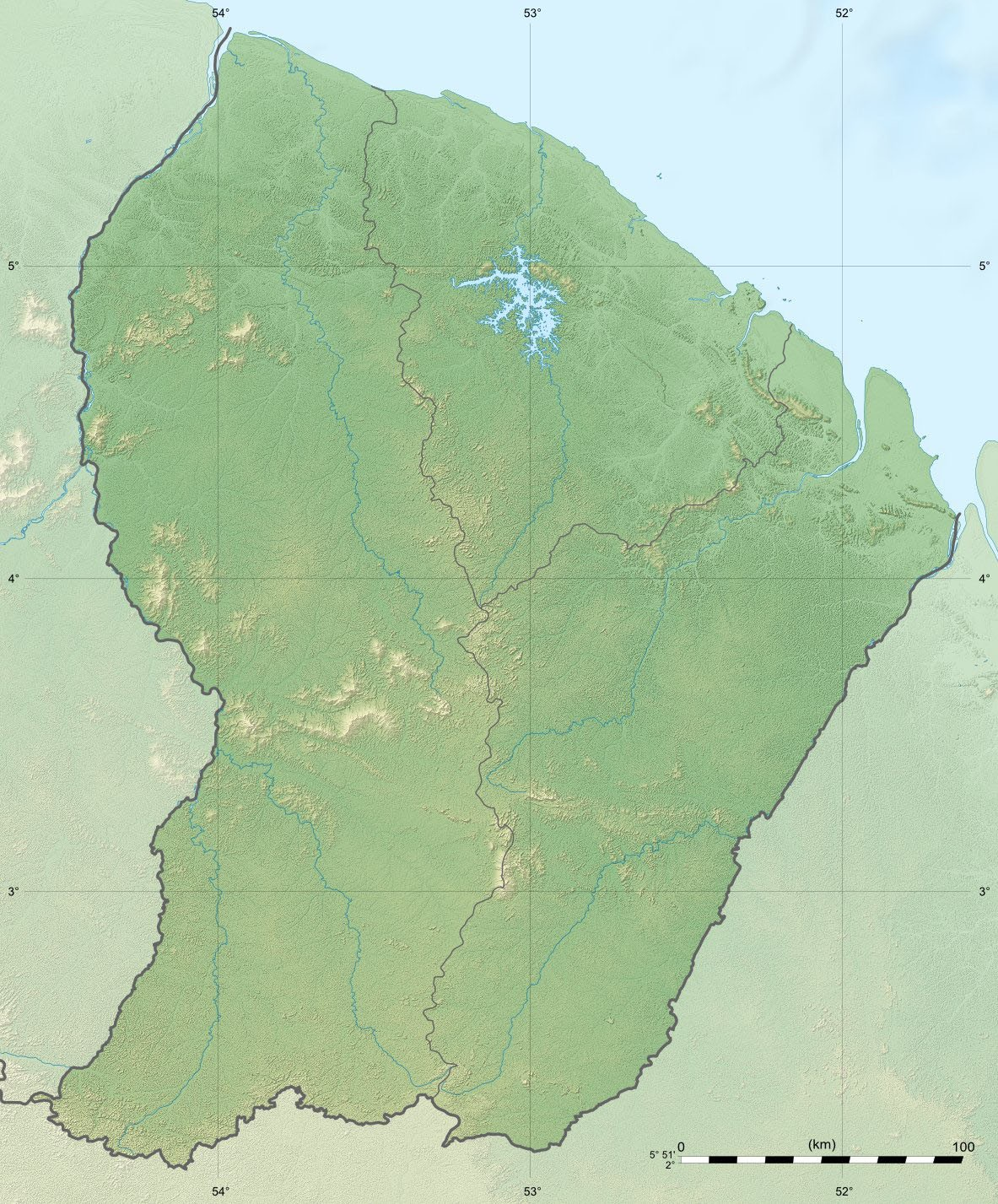
- Location within French Guiana

Location
- Commune: Saül & Maripasoula, French Guiana

Physical characteristics
- Source
  - location: Confluence of the Emerillon Creek and the Limonade Creek
  - coordinates: 3.3969°N 53.2408°W
- Mouth
  - location: Confluence with Lawa
  - coordinates: 03°38′55″N 54°00′15″W
- Length: 215 km

Basin features
- Progression: Lawa→ Maroni→ Atlantic Ocean

The Inini or Grand Inini is a river in western French Guiana. It is a tributary of the Lawa, the upper course of the Maroni. The river is 215 km (134 mi) long (including its upper course Limonade) and non-navigable. The Inini is the only major river in French Guiana which runs east to west, unlike the other major rivers which run south to north. In the beginning of the 20th century, it was the site of a gold rush, and the gold prospectors have become active in the region again since the 1990s. The Inini territory which has existed between 1930 and 1946 was named after this river.
