= Alawataimë enï =

- Location in French Guiana
- Coordinates: 3°23′8″N 54°2′36″W
- Country: France
- Overseas region: French Guiana
- Arrondissement: Saint-Laurent-du-Maroni
- Commune: Maripasoula

Government
  - Captain: Kulienpë

Population (2009)
  - Total: 88

Alawataimë enï is a Wayana village situated on the Lawa River in French Guiana.

== Geography ==
Alawataimë enï lies to the northeast of the village of Taluwen and Epoja.
