= Aldeia Bona =

Aldeia Bona Karapaeukuru Aldeia Apalaí
- Location in Brazil Aldeia Bona (Brazil)
- Coordinates: 1°12′54″N 54°39′21″W
- Country: Brazil
- State: Pará
- Municipality: Almeirim

Population (2018)
  - Total: 288

Aldeia Bona or Aldeia Apalaí, sometimes also known by its Native name Karapaeukuru, is an Apalaí-Wayana village on the Eastern Paru River in the state of Pará in Brazil.

== History ==
Aldeia Bona was founded in 1970 by the Fundação Nacional do Índio (FUNAI) in an effort to halt the socio-cultural disintegration that was taking place among the Apalaí and Wayana in Brazil. An airstrip was constructed by the Brazilian Air Force to ease access to the remote area.

Shortly after its creation, Aldeia Bona housed about 60% of the Apalaí and Wayana population of the region. The concentration of the population mostly served the interests of the Brazilian government employees stationed in the village, however, and did not adhere to the criteria the indigenous Apalaí and Wayana use for founding a village. Consequently, traditional settlement patterns, i.e. small villages of a few households spread out along a large area, reemerged after a while. Still, Aldeia Bona remains the largest Apalaí-Wayana settlement on the Paru River and continues to serve as the access point to the area.

== Demographics ==
Historical population
Year	Pop.	±% p.a.
1972	55	—
1978	94	+9.34%
1981	161	+19.65%
1982	111	−31.06%
2016	267	+2.62%
Source: Ricardo 1983, p. 140

In June 2016, Aldeia Bona had 267 inhabitants, of whom 157 were Apalaí, 105 were Wayana and 5 were Tiriyó.
