= Palimino =

- Location in French Guiana
- Coordinates: 3°17′35″N 54°5′50″W
- Country: France
- Overseas region: French Guiana
- Arrondissement: Saint-Laurent-du-Maroni
- Commune: Maripasoula

Palimino is a Wayana village on the Litani River.

== Geography ==
Palimino lies about 800 m (2,600 ft) upstream the Litani River from the village of Pëleya and about 2.5 km (1.6 mi) downstream from the village of Pilima.
