= Grand Abounami =

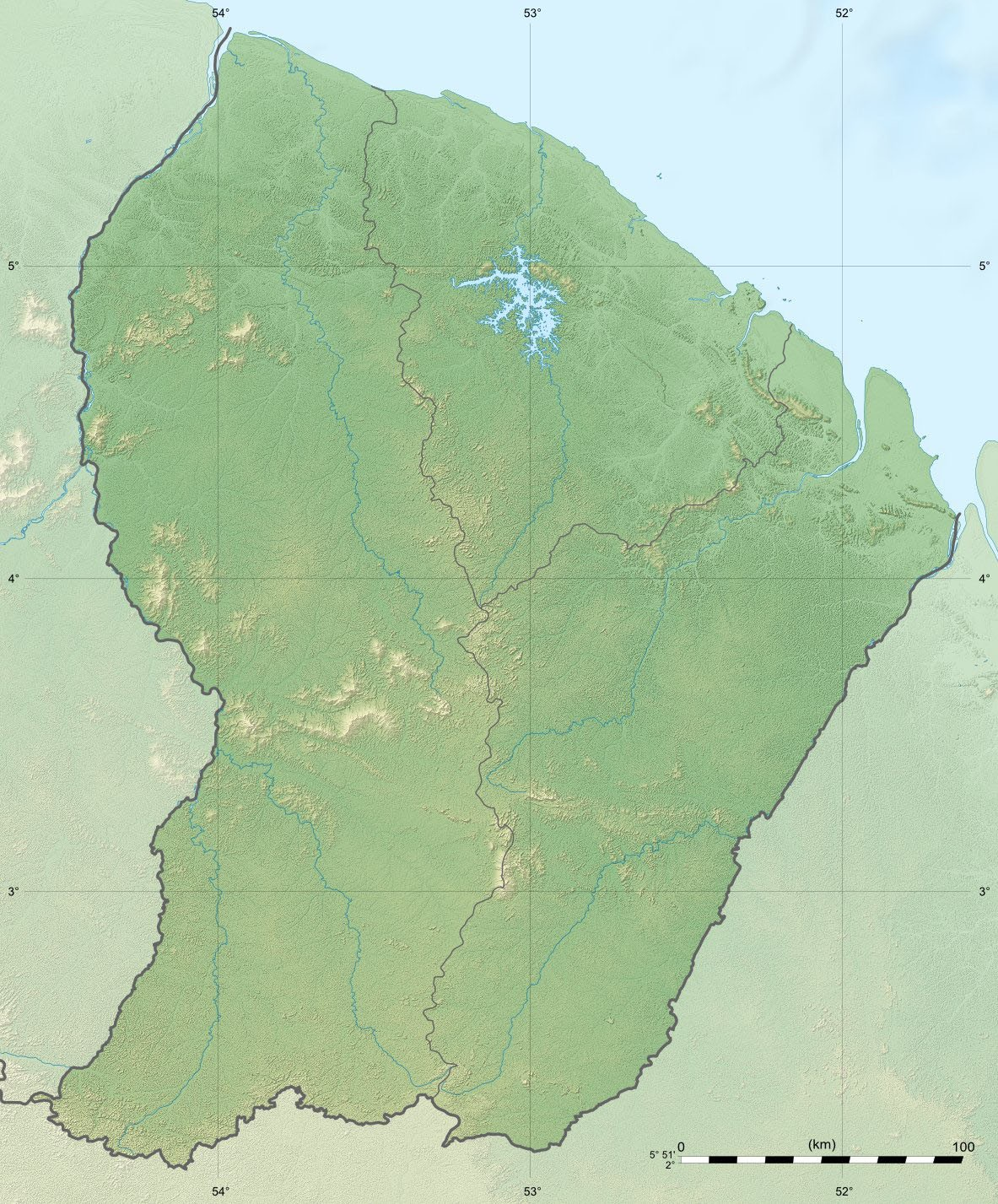
- Location within French Guiana

Location
- Country: France
- Region: French Guiana

Physical characteristics
- Mouth: Lawa
  - coordinates: 4.4013°N 54.4053°W
- Length: 159 km (99 mi)

Basin features
- Progression: Lawa→ Maroni→ Atlantic Ocean

The Grand Abounami is a river in western French Guiana. It is a right tributary of the Lawa (the upper course of the Maroni). It is 159 km (99 mi) long.
