= Wayana =

Indigenous people located in the Guiana highlands

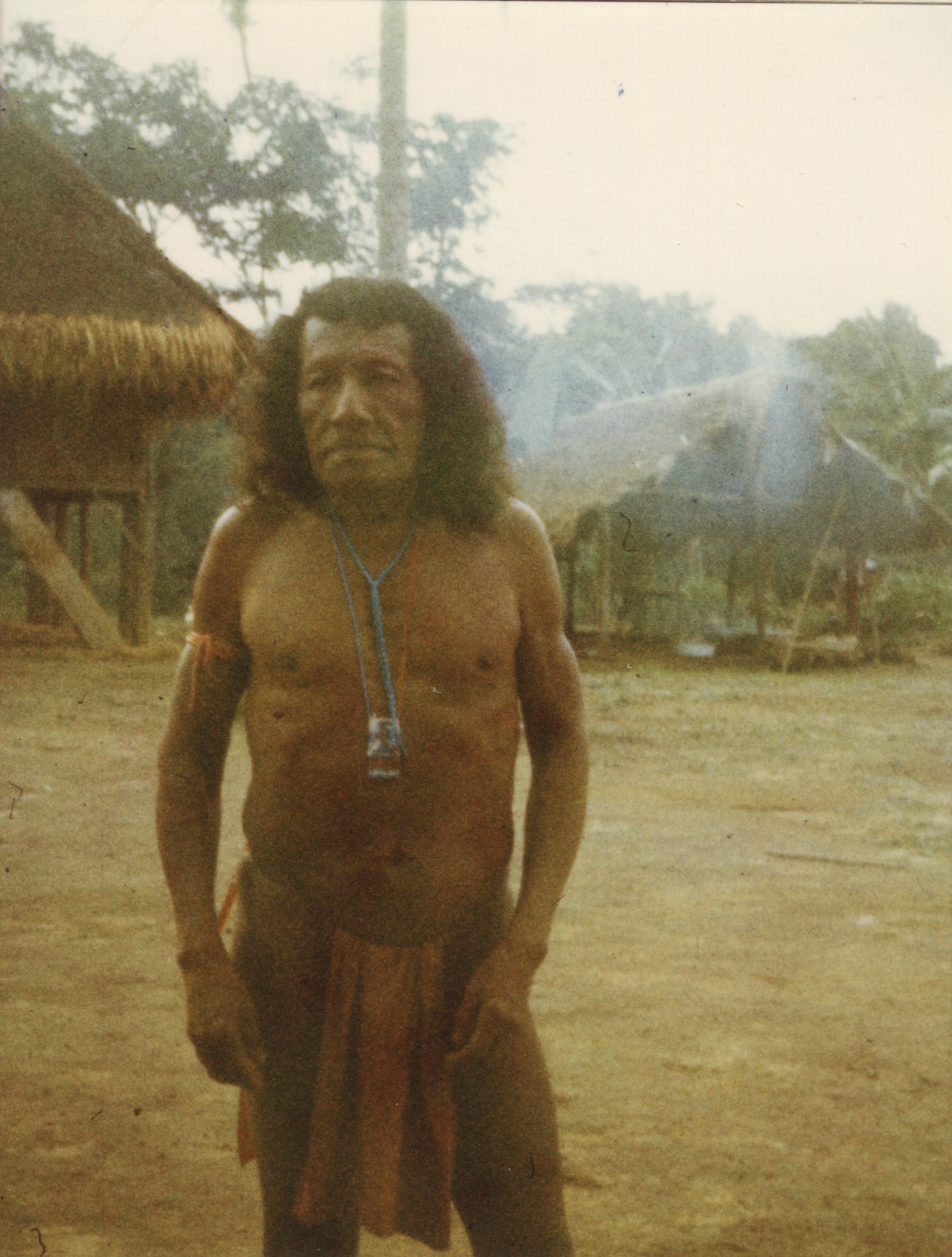
- Wayana man, 1979

Total population
- 1,500 (2006)

Regions with significant populations
- French Guiana; Suriname; Brazil

Languages
- Wayana

Related ethnic groups
- Aparai

The Wayana (Note: Also known as the Ajana, Uaiana, Alucuyana, Guaque, Ojana, Oyana, Orcocoyana, Pirixi, Urukuena or Waiano people) (Portuguese: Uaiana; Eastern Maroon Creole: Alukuyan) are a Carib-speaking people located in the southeastern part of the Guiana highlands, a region divided between Brazil, Suriname, and French Guiana. In 1980, when the last census took place, the Wayana numbered some 1,500 individuals, of which 150 in Brazil, among the Apalai, 400 in Suriname, and 1,000 in French Guiana, along the Maroni River. About half of them still speak their original language.

== History ==
According to both oral tradition and descriptions by 20th century European explorers, the Wayana emerged fairly recently as a distinctive group; contemporary Wayana are considered an amalgation of smaller ethnic groups such as the Upului, Opagwana, and Kukuyana. In the eighteenth century, the ancestors of the Wayana lived along the Paru and Jari rivers in contemporary Brazil, and along the upper tributaries of the Oyapock river, which nowadays forms the border between French Guiana and Brazil.

The first recorded mentioning of the tribe was in 1769 across a Wayana village. By the late 18th century, the ancestors of the Wayana were involved in an almost continuous military struggle with Tupi peoples such as the Wayampi, which drove them across the Tumuk Humak Mountains to the upper tributaries of the Litani river. Around the same time, the Aluku maroons, who had fled plantations in Suriname, were driven up the Litani river by Dutch colonial forces aided by Ndyuka maroons, who had settled for peace with the colonial authorities in return for military assistance against "incursions" from new maroon groups. From that moment on, an intensive trade relationship developed between the Wayana and the Aluku, and both tribes often living together in the same villages. In 1815, the Aluku and Wayana became blood brothers.

Over time, the Wayana migrated with the Aluku further downstream the Litani and Lawa rivers to end up in their contemporary position. In 1865, the Ndyuka granman Alabi invited a Wayana group still living along the Paru river in Brazil to join them along the Tapanahony river in Suriname, probably inspired by the arrangement with the Wayana that the Aluku had. This particular group still lives in villages along the Tapanahony and Palumeu rivers.

Despite limited contacts with outsiders, imported diseases ravished the tribe in the early 20th century, and reduced the population to an estimated 500 to 600 people. From 1962 onward, American missionaries from the West-Indies Mission, who had previously worked with the Tiriyó, encouraged the population to concentrate in larger villages and provided access to health care, schooling, and to make it easier to convert the population. The French part of the interior used to be the Territory of Inini which allowed for an autonomous and self sufficient tribal system for the native population without clear borders. In 1968 the Wayana settlements in France became part of the Grand-Santi-Papaïchton community circle of French Guiana which became separate communes a year later. Along with the commune, came a government structure, and francisation. In the late 1980s, the Surinamese Interior War stopped development on the Suriname side and many fled to the French side of the border. The late 20th and early 21st century marked the beginning of (eco)tourism, but also illegal gold mining. Along with miners came the bars, prostitution, and gambling. The Maripasoula commune is sometimes referred to as "Far West" in the mainstream French media, because of its high crime rate.

== Society and culture ==
Wayana society is characterized by a rather low degree of social stratification. Villages often comprise not more than one extended family and are rather loosely linked to their neighbouring villages by kinship ties, marital exchanges, shared rituals and trade. Missionaries and representatives of the state have only partially succeeded in grouping the Wayana together in larger settlements, and despite the fact that the Wayana are not as nomadic as before, villages are by no means permanent, and are often abandoned after the death of a leader.

Villages are often led by a shaman or pïyai, who mediate Wayana contact with the world of spirits and deities, act as healers, and who are consulted in matters concerning hunting and fishing. Many Wayana villages still feature a community house or tukusipan.

=== Ëputop ===
Coming of age was for a long time associated with a ritual called ëputop or maraké, in which a wicker frame full of stinging ants or wasps was applied to the bodies of adolescent boys and girls, who emerged from the ceremony as adult men and women. While older Wayana still to a degree define their Wayanahood by the number of ëputop they underwent during their lifetime, many younger Wayana reject the necessity of undergoing ëputop to become a valued member of society. As a result, few ëputop ceremonies occur today. One of the more recent ëputop ceremonies took place in 2004 in the village of Talhuwen, organized by Aïmawale Opoya, grandson of Wayana leader Janomalë, in consultation with French film director Jean-Philippe Isel, who made a documentary about the ritual.

In spite of its demise, ëputop was listed on the inventory of intangible cultural heritage drawn up by the French Ministry of Culture in 2011.

== Political organisation ==
Granman of the Wayana

Suriname
- Incumbent; Aptuk Noewahe since 1976
- Residence: Pïlëuwimë

French Guiana
- Incumbent; Amaipotï since 1985
- Residence: Kulumuli

Before contact with missionaries and state representatives, the Wayana did not recognise a form of leadership that transcended the village level. The Surinamese, French, and Brazilian states preferred to centralise their dealings with the Wayana, however, and, for this purpose, installed captains, head captains, and granman among the Wayana leaders. The Wayana's traditional institutions and expectations often limited the authority of these captains beyond their own villages.

In Suriname, Kananoe Apetina was made "head captain" of the Wayana on the Tapanahony river in 1937, while Janomalë was made "head captain" of the Wayana on the Lawa and Litani rivers in 1938. After the death of Janomalë in 1958, Anapaikë was installed as his successor, and served as the leader of the Wayana on the Surinamese side of the Lawa river until he died in 2003. Kananu Apetina died in 1975 and was succeeded by Aptuk Noewahe, who was recognised by the Surinamese government as the granman of all Wayana in Suriname until his death in 2023. The current head captain on the Lawa river is Ipomadi Pelenapïn, who was installed in August 2005.

The current granman of the Wayana in French Guiana is Amaipotï, son of first granman Twenkë, who resides in the village of Kulumuli.

== Contemporary settlements ==
Wayana settlements in Suriname and French Guiana and the northernmost villages in Brazil. In the, by Wayana standards, densely populated region of the Litani and Upper Lawa rivers only the most important settlements are indicated with a label.

Place	Coordinates	Inhabitants	River	Country
Lensidede	4°1′36″N 54°19′58″W	50	Lawa	Suriname
Tedamali	3°39′6″N 54°0′28″W	100	Lawa	France
Élahé (Malipahpan)	3°27′54″N 54°0′17″W	50	Tampok	France
Kayodé	3°23′23″N 53°55′29″W	70	Tampok	France
Kawemhakan (Anapaikë)	3°24′42″N 54°1′33″W	200	Lawa	Suriname
Alawataimë enï	3°23′8″N 54°2′36″W	25	Lawa	France
Talhuwen (Epoja)	3°22′54″N 54°3′1″W	146	Lawa	France
Kulumuli (Twenkë)	3°23′1″N 54°3′16″W	88	Lawa	France
Pïleike	3°23′13″N 54°3′11″W	0	Lawa	Suriname
Kumakahpan	3°21′40″N 54°3′31″W	27	Lawa	Suriname
Antécume-Pata	3°17′53″N 54°4′16″W	175	Lawa	France
Palasisi (Wapahpan)	3°17′27″N 54°5′1″W	15	Litani	France
Pëleya	3°17′34″N 54°5′22″W	15	Litani	France
Palimino	3°17′35″N 54°5′50″W	15	Litani	France
Pilima	3°17′11″N 54°6′35″W	40	Litani	France
Tutu Kampu (Kulumuli)	3°34′38″N 54°57′5″W	22	Tapanahony	Suriname
Apetina (Pïlëuwimë)	3°30′37″N 55°3′7″W	324	Tapanahony	Suriname
Akani Pata	3°29′50″N 55°3′53″W	20	Tapanahony	Suriname
Paloemeu	3°20′43″N 55°26′35″W	283	Tapanahony	Suriname
Iyaherai	1°42′23″N 54°59′22″W	43	Paru	Brazil
Manau	1°35′11″N 54°55′14″W	16	Paru	Brazil
Iliwa	1°22′36″N 54°44′40″W	11	Paru	Brazil
Maxipurimoine	1°16′41″N 54°40′33″W	33	Paru	Brazil
Aldeia Bona / Apalaí (Karapaeukuru)	1°12′54″N 54°39′21″W	288	Paru	Brazil
Murei	1°12′39″N 54°37′47″W	21	Paru	Brazil
Kapuimënë	1°11′43″N 54°37′15″W		Paru	Brazil
Tawaeukulu	1°9′8″N 54°35′17″W	8	Paru	Brazil
Aramapuku	1°7′4″N 54°36′58″W	20	Paru	Brazil
Arawaka	1°2′57″N 54°37′51″W	37	Paru	Brazil
Tapauku	1°2′20″N 54°38′37″W	54	Paru	Brazil
Aliwemënë	1°1′57″N 54°39′28″W		Paru	Brazil
Kurupohpano	0°59′1″N 54°36′5″W	38	Paru	Brazil
Suisuimënë (Xuixuimënë)	0°51′12″N 54°38′46″W	74	Paru	Brazil
Jolokoman	0°41′59″N 54°32′24″W	20	Paru	Brazil
Ananapiareh	0°37′16″N 54°25′51″W	36	Paru	Brazil
Kurimuripano	0°38′38″N 54°20′39″W	37	Paru	Brazil
Itapeky	0°34′50″N 54°14′47″W	25	Paru	Brazil
Purureh	0°35′13″N 54°12′32″W	60	Paru	Brazil
Parahparah	0°29′15″N 54°6′7″W	46	Paru	Brazil
