= Antécume-Pata =

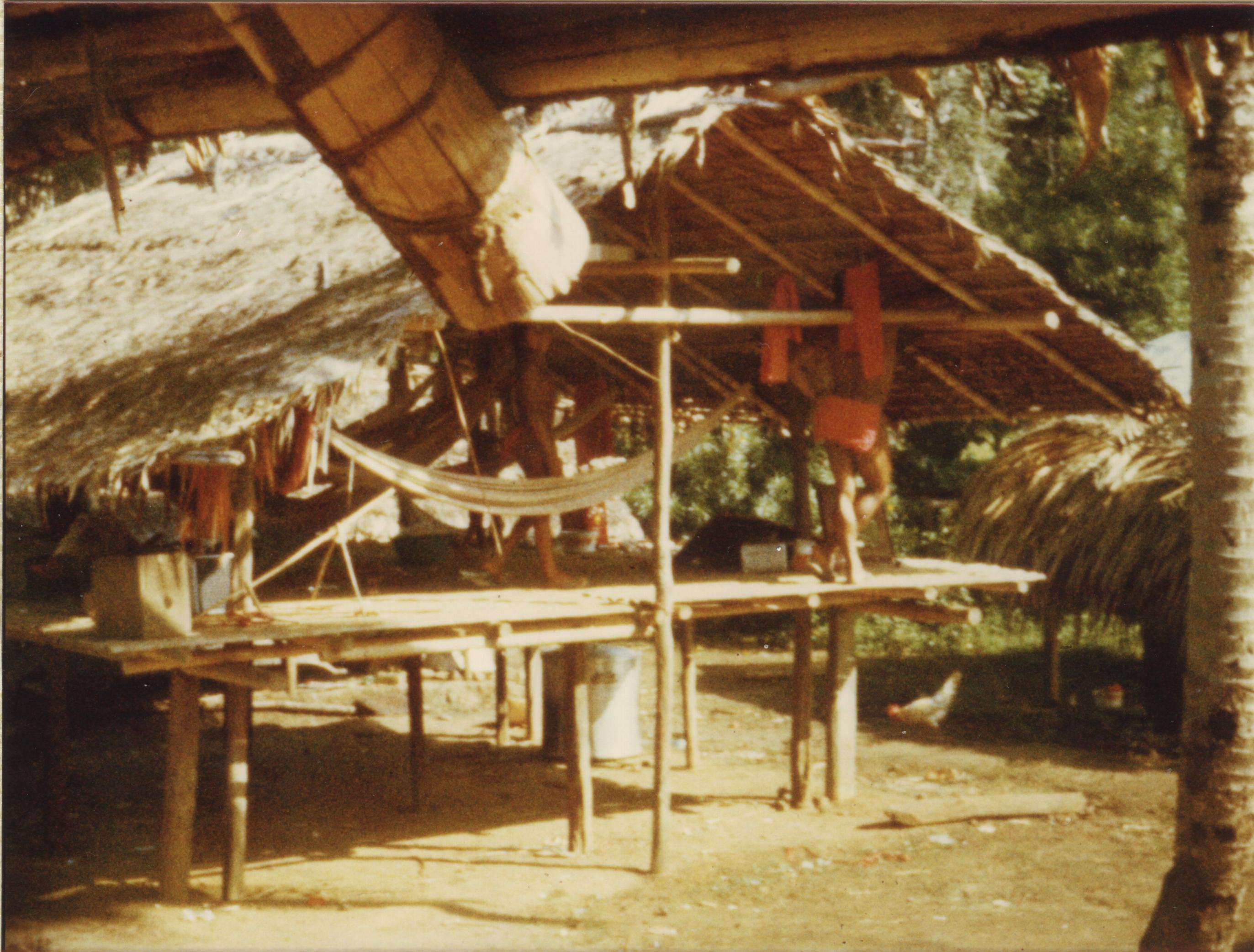
- A traditional house in Antécume-Pata.

- Location in French Guiana
- Coordinates: 3°17′48″N 54°04′19″W
- Country: France
- Overseas region: French Guiana
- Arrondissement: Saint-Laurent-du-Maroni
- Commune: Maripasoula

Population (2009)
  - Total: 150

Antécume-Pata is a village in French Guiana, France. It was founded by André Cognat, a Pierre-Bénite-born Wayana tribal chief. It is home to a nursery and primary state school. Even though French is taught at the school, Sranan Tongo is still the lingua franca (common language) in the region.

== Geography ==
Antécume-Pata lies about 7 km (4.3 mi) up the Lawa River from the village of Kumakahpan and 1.5 km (0.93 mi) down the Lawa River from the village of Palasisi.
