= Maripasoula =

Commune in French Guiana, France

- Commune
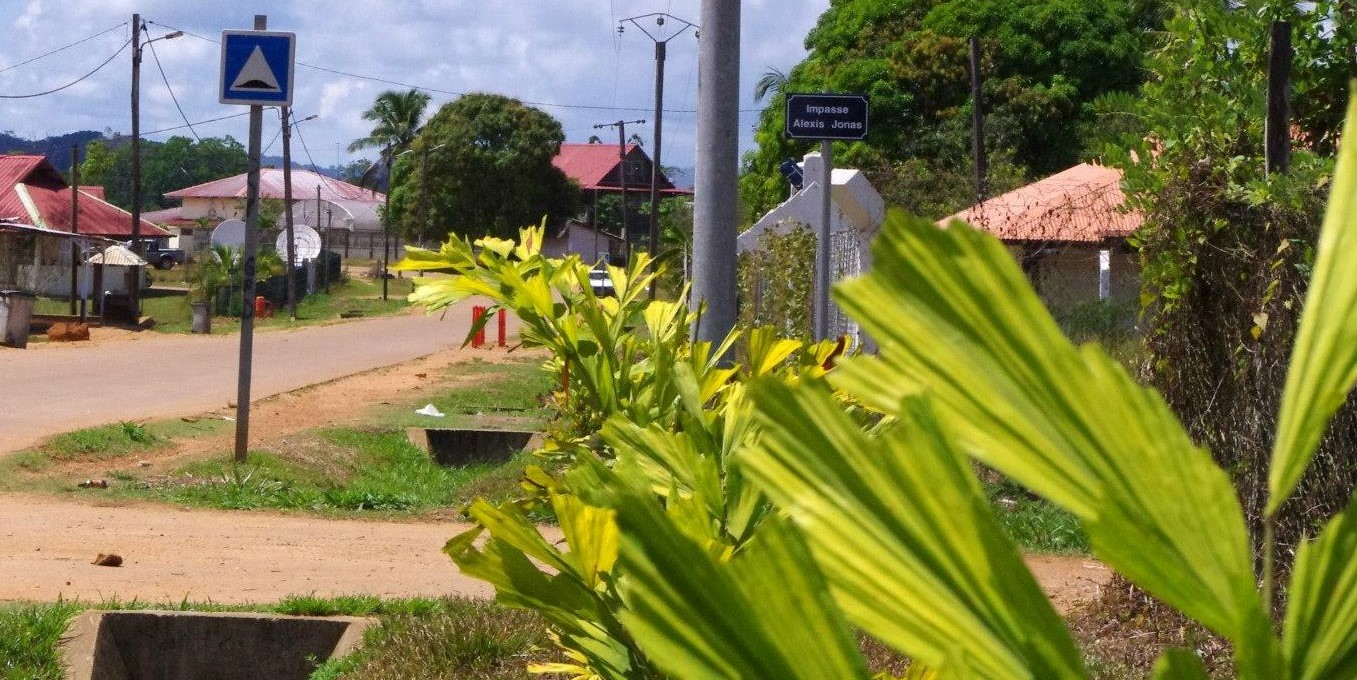
- A view of Maripasoula post office

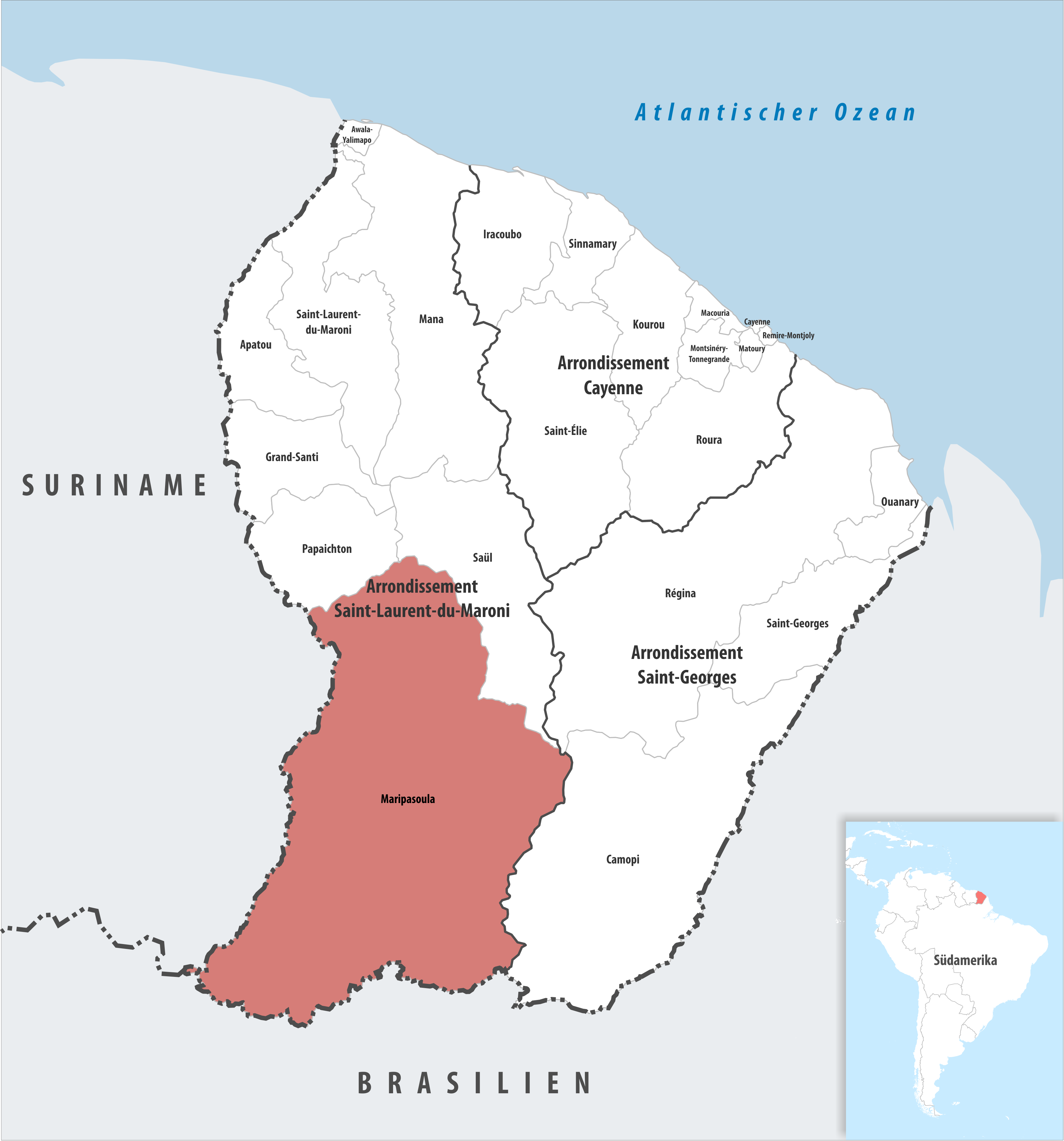
- Location of the commune (in red) within French Guiana
- Location of Maripasoula
- Coordinates: 3°38′40″N 54°02′02″W
- Country: France
- Overseas region and department: French Guiana
- Arrondissement: Saint-Laurent-du-Maroni
- Intercommunality: Ouest Guyanais

Government
  - Mayor (2020–2026): Serge Anelli
- Area^{1}: 18,360 km^{2} (7,090 sq mi)
- Population (2023): 9,579
  - Density: 0.5217/km^{2} (1.351/sq mi)
- Time zone: UTC−03:00
- INSEE/Postal code: 97353 /97370
- ^{1} French Land Register data, which excludes lakes, ponds, glaciers > 1 km^{2} (0.386 sq mi or 247 acres) and river estuaries.

Maripasoula (French pronunciation: [maʁipasula]), previously named Upper Maroni, is a commune of French Guiana, an overseas region and department of France located in South America. With a land area of 18,360 km^{2} (7,090 sq mi), Maripasoula is the largest commune of France. The commune is slightly larger than the country of Kuwait or the U.S. state of New Jersey.

== Geography ==
The Lawa and Maroni Rivers form a natural border with Suriname on the west, and with Brazil on the south.

About a tenth of the Maripasoula commune is claimed by Suriname. A bilateral commission has been set up to resolve the dispute. Suriname, contends that the boundary follows the Marowini River to the east, while France asserts that the border follows the Litani River and Coulé-Coulé Creek to the west.

=== Villages ===
- Alawataimë enï
- Antécume-Pata
- Élahé
- Epoja
- Kayodé
- Kulumuli
- Nouveau Wakapou
- Palasisi
- Palimino
- Pëleya
- Pilima
- Talhuwen
- Tedamali

=== Transport ===
Maripasoula is served by Maripasoula Airport, with services on one commercial passenger airline.

The commune can be accessed only by air, or by boat via the Maroni river. The unpaved path between Maripasoula and Papaïchton will be turned into a proper road. Road work has commenced on 20 July 2020 and is scheduled to be completed by 2021. There are plans to extend the Route Nationale from Saint-Laurent-du-Maroni to Maripasoula, however the Route Nationale currently ends south of Apatou.

=== Climate ===
Maripasoula has a tropical monsoon climate (Köppen Am) and is very warm to hot and humid all year round. Although there is a decline in rainfall between August and November, this is much less marked than in Cayenne and Kourou.

Climate data for Maripasoula (1991–2020 averages, extremes 1955−present)
Month	Jan	Feb	Mar	Apr	May	Jun	Jul	Aug	Sep	Oct	Nov	Dec	Year
Record high °C (°F)	34.4 (93.9)	34.6 (94.3)	35.7 (96.3)	35.4 (95.7)	35.1 (95.2)	35.1 (95.2)	35.4 (95.7)	36.3 (97.3)	36.8 (98.2)	37.6 (99.7)	38.2 (100.8)	36.4 (97.5)	38.2 (100.8)
Mean daily maximum °C (°F)	31.1 (88.0)	31.1 (88.0)	31.6 (88.9)	31.7 (89.1)	31.7 (89.1)	31.9 (89.4)	32.2 (90.0)	33.0 (91.4)	33.9 (93.0)	34.3 (93.7)	33.7 (92.7)	32.2 (90.0)	32.4 (90.3)
Daily mean °C (°F)	26.8 (80.2)	26.8 (80.2)	27.1 (80.8)	27.4 (81.3)	27.4 (81.3)	27.3 (81.1)	27.3 (81.1)	27.6 (81.7)	27.9 (82.2)	28.2 (82.8)	28.1 (82.6)	27.4 (81.3)	27.4 (81.3)
Mean daily minimum °C (°F)	22.5 (72.5)	22.5 (72.5)	22.7 (72.9)	23.0 (73.4)	23.2 (73.8)	22.8 (73.0)	22.3 (72.1)	22.2 (72.0)	22.0 (71.6)	22.2 (72.0)	22.5 (72.5)	22.7 (72.9)	22.6 (72.7)
Record low °C (°F)	16.9 (62.4)	17.7 (63.9)	18.0 (64.4)	18.6 (65.5)	18.4 (65.1)	19.4 (66.9)	18.5 (65.3)	17.9 (64.2)	17.5 (63.5)	16.9 (62.4)	17.6 (63.7)	18.2 (64.8)	16.9 (62.4)
Average precipitation mm (inches)	223.1 (8.78)	235.3 (9.26)	238.7 (9.40)	284.7 (11.21)	354.0 (13.94)	280.8 (11.06)	204.8 (8.06)	159.7 (6.29)	58.1 (2.29)	69.8 (2.75)	111.9 (4.41)	194.7 (7.67)	2,415.6 (95.10)
Average precipitation days (≥ 1.0 mm)	20.9	19.5	19.1	21.1	25.6	23.2	20.3	16.0	8.0	7.8	11.1	18.9	211.6
Mean monthly sunshine hours	—	113.4	132.7	129.8	—	—	181.9	214.4	240.7	253.0	207.8	169.6	—
Source 1: Météo-France
Source 2: Meteociel (sunshine 1981–2010)

== History ==
The town of Maripasoula was officially founded as Upper Maroni at the end of the 19th century when gold was discovered. In 1953, the residents decided to change the name to Maripasoula. Since the beginning of the 21st century, Maripasoula has been at the heart of a gold rush. The majority of fortune seekers are illegal Brazilian garimpeiro. Efforts by the French gendarme and military to stop the illegal gold mining have resulted in illegal settlements across the Lawa River in Suriname where villages like Antonio do Brinco have sprung up. These villages contain a string of supermarkets, restaurants, bars and brothels, and cater to both the gold prospectors and the town of Maripasoula because of significantly lower prices and convenience.

Because of problems with crime in the region, the town was often referred to as "Far West" in the early 2000's, in a reference to the United States' historical Wild West. In August 2020, the development of the first Lycee de Maripasoula for 820 students was announced, and €32 million for construction work between Maripasoula and Papaïchton.

== Population ==
Maripasoula City's inhabitants are known in French as Maripasouliens and Maripasouliennes. They are mainly the Maroon tribes Aluku (aka Boni), the Amerindian Wayana tribe, and the Saint Lucian and Guadeloupean Creoles. Except for residents of the city centre, the commune has a largely tribal population. The town is very ethnically diverse. In 1945, the town centre was home to 45 people, and the entire region was home to 952 people.

Historical population
Year	Pop.	±% p.a.
1967	636	—
1974	884	+4.82%
1982	1,007	+1.64%
1990	1,748	+7.14%
1999	3,710	+8.72%
2007	5,545	+5.15%
2012	9,970	+12.45%
2017	13,227	+5.82%
2023	9,579	−5.24%
Source: INSEE

== Sites of interest ==
=== Protected buildings and historical monuments ===
Near the Maroni River, petroglyphs have been found depicting many animals and humans. Other monuments are the Roches gravées de la crique du Marouini à Maripasoula.

=== National park ===
Most of the southern territory of Maripasoula makes up most of the area dedicated to the Guiana Amazonian Park (French: Parc amazonien de Guyane). The Biodiversity of the region of the Amazonian rainforest is one of the richest in the world. Bellevue de l'Inini, the highest mountain in French Guiana, is located in Maripasoula.

== Notable residents ==
- Cyrille Regis – former West Bromwich Albion, Coventry City, and England national football team player, born in Maripasoula.
- Jacobin Yoma – professional boxer.

== See also ==
- Communes of French Guiana
