= Tampok =

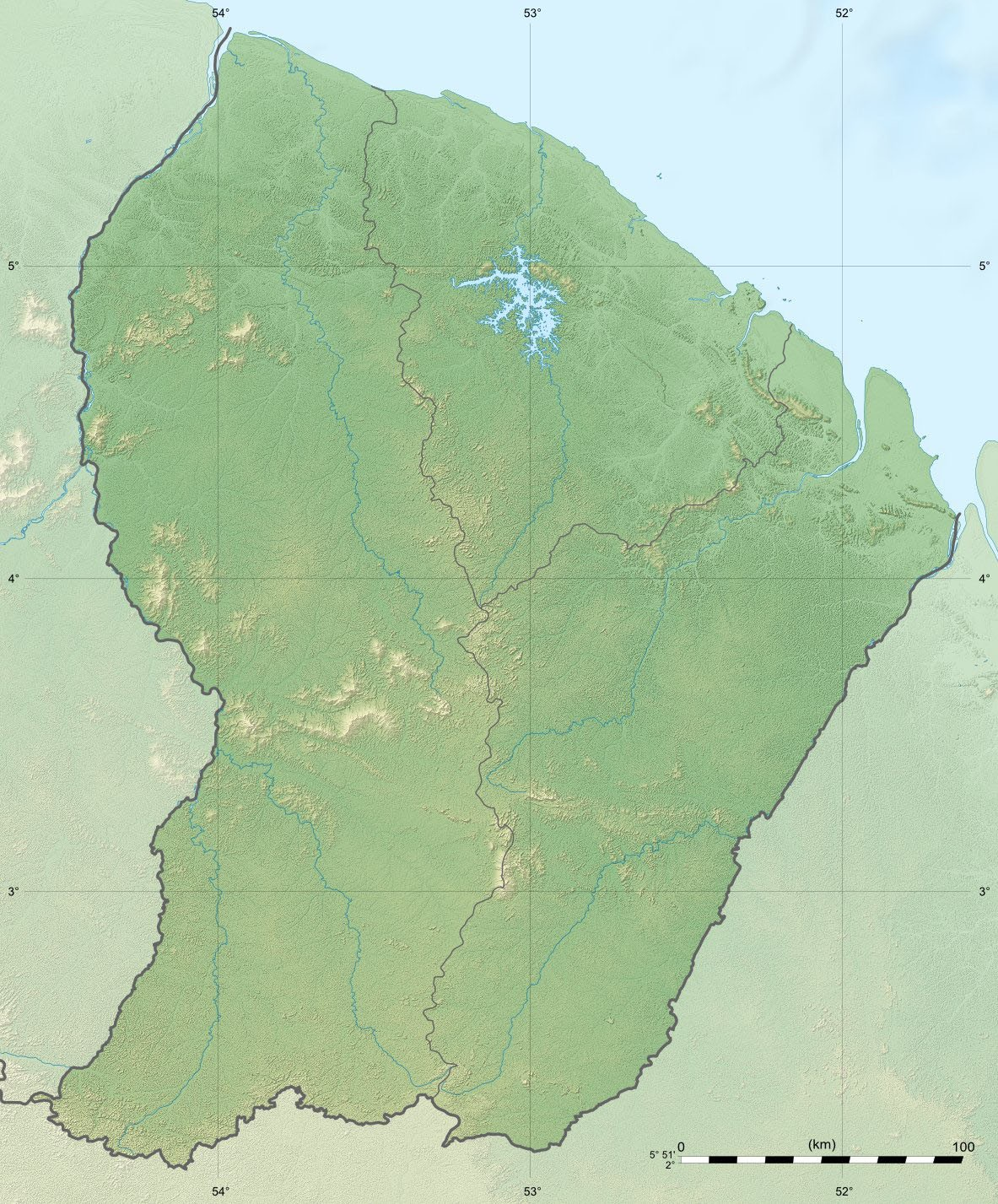
- Location within French Guiana

Location
- Country: France
- Region: French Guiana

Physical characteristics
- Mouth: Lawa
  - coordinates: 3.4511°N 53.9992°W
- Length: 268 km (167 mi)

Basin features
- Progression: Lawa→ Maroni→ Atlantic Ocean

The Tampok is a right tributary of the river Lawa (the upper course of the Maroni) in western French Guiana. It is 268 km (167 mi) long.
