= Wayana language =

Cariban language spoken in South America

Wayana
- Urukuyana, Roucouyenne
- Native to: Suriname, French Guiana, Brazil
- Ethnicity: Wayana people
- Native speakers: 1,700 (2012)
- Language family: Cariban: Guianan Carib; Wayana–Apalaí?; Wayana

Language codes
- ISO 639-3: way
- Glottolog: waya1269
- ELP: Wayana
- Linguasphere: 80-AED-a
- Wayana is classified as Vulnerable by the UNESCO Atlas of the World's Languages in Danger

Cultural objects from the Wayana people in Suriname

Wayana (Note: Also referred to as Ojana, Ajana, Aiana, Ouyana, Uajana, Upurui, Oepoeroei, Roucouyen, Rucuyene, Oreocoyana, Orkokoyana, Urucuiana, Urukuyana, and Alucuyana in the literature) (Portuguese: uaiana, Eastern Maroon Creole: Alukuyantongo) is a language of the Cariban family, spoken by the Wayana people, who live mostly in the borderlands of French Guiana, Brazil, and Suriname.

In Brazil, they live along the Paru and Jari rivers, in Suriname, along the Tapanahoni and Paloemeu rivers, and in French Guiana, along the upper Maroni River and its tributaries.

The exact number of Wayana is unclear. The issue is complicated because counts are done on a per-country basis. Ethnologue lists 1,700 users of the language as of 2012 and 1,900 ethnic Wayana in all countries, using counts from 2006 and 2012. Instituto Socioambental, a Brazilian NGO, lists 1,629 ethnic Wayana, using counts from 2002 and 2014. The count of ethnic Wayana individuals is further complicated due to the close ties that the Wayana share with other ethnic groups in the region, especially the Aparai in Brazil, to the extent that they are sometimes considered one group, the Wayana-Aparai.

== History ==
The Wayana are considered to be an amalgamation of several smaller ethnic groups, having subsumed the Upurui, Kukuyana, Opagwana, and Kumarawana, among others. They have extremely close ties with the Aparai, with whom they have lived and intermarried for at least 100 years in Brazil, though both the Aparai and Wayana consider themselves separate ethnic groups, differentiating themselves linguistically and through cultural practices. There are few Aparai in Wayana territory outside of Brazil.

This unique situation is a result of European contact and interethnic conflict in the past four centuries. Disease forced dwindling populations of smaller ethnic groups to amalgamate with the Wayana in the 18th century for increased survival. Also in the 18th century, around the time of European arrival in the Brazilian interior, the Wayana, whose original territory is considered to be Northern Brazil, started to migrate to Suriname and French Guiana due to conflicts resulting indirectly from colonization. As a result, there are three distinct Wayana territories today. The remaining Wayana in Brazil forged ties with the Aparai, who had migrated to their territory, and continue to maintain kinship and trade ties with Wayana in Suriname and French Guiana.

The Wayana (and Aparai) were involved heavily with trade, especially with the meikolo (Black Maroons), as well as Brazilian and Surinamese traders until the end of the 19th century. In the 20th century, Wayana started working in rubber extraction, and started to settle in villages, ending their traditionally nomadic way of life. By mid-century, missionaries (including a SIL project from 1962 to 1992) and government institutions started to gain presence in Brazilian Wayana-Aparai territory, implementing government health and education services. FUNAI has maintained a post, and has granted assistance in the region since 1973.

== Classification ==
The Cariban languages—to which Wayana belongs—are distributed throughout Northern South America, in Northern Brazil, Venezuela, Guyana, French Guiana, and Suriname, with speakers also in Colombia and Central Brazil. There are an estimated 25 remaining Cariban languages, with references to over 100 in the historical literature. Many of the Cariban languages referenced in the literature, and others unknown to Europeans, have gone extinct due to European contact. The number of speakers of all Cariban languages is estimated to be 60,000 to 100,000, though more than half speak the Carib language proper, Makushi, Pemong, or Kapong (the last three are closely related). Most Cariban languages have 100 to 3,000 speakers.

Documentation of both the extinct and remaining languages is scant in many cases, consisting of wordlists with flawed phonetic transcription and little grammatical description. Classification of Cariban languages into branches is therefore difficult, though many recent descriptive research projects are rectifying the lack of accurate data of the living Cariban languages. Wayana is considered by Kaufman (1994, as cited by Gildea, 2003) to be part of his proposed central branch, but a more recent classification (Gildea, 2005) considers it unclassified.

== Research ==
Wayana, compared to its many of its Cariban peers, is very well described. The first work on Wayana was wordlists by Crevaux (1882, as cited by Tavares, 2005), Coudreau (1892), and De Goeje (1909, as cited by Tavares, 2005). De Goeje also published an incomplete grammar detailing some morphological aspects of Wayana in 1946 (as cited by Tavares, 2005). Walter Jackson's 1972 "A Wayana Grammar" builds on this grammar and clarifies some of the flaws in De Goeje's description of morphology and phonology, but still leaves many morphological and syntactic distinctions untouched.

Kenneth Howell's 1982 MA thesis describes a specific aspect of Wayana syntax – constituent order. The most comprehensive work on Wayana is the 2005 PhD dissertation of Petronila Tavares, "A Grammar of Wayana", which is a descriptive grammar of Wayana's phonology, morphology, and syntax. Wayana is morphologically rich, and thus, most emphasis is given to morphology. The grammar provides little theoretical elaboration, "hop[ing] that future researchers will fill this gap" (Tavares, 2005, pp. 6).

Eliane Camargo, who started fieldwork among the Wayana at the same time as Tavares, has also significantly contributed to the study of Wayana language, with many descriptions of specific features of Wayana, such as nominal possession, postpositions, word order, and nominative aspect markers. She wrote a Wayana–Portuguese dictionary in 1997, as well as a Wayana–French dictionary in 2010. Lastly, she has written several works of linguistic anthropology, concerning bi-/multi-lingualism amongst the Wayana.

Much anthropological work has been conducted regarding the Wayana. Early ethnographic studies include de Goeje and Huralt, among others. The Wayana's relationship with the Aparai has also elicited many ethnographic studies on subjects such as their bilingualism (Camargo 1997), their kinship (Koehn 1975) and their exchange patterns (Barbosa 2007). More recently, the Wayana-Aparai were also part of ProDocult, which is an effort from the Brazilian government to document indigenous culture, by creating digital archives and training indigenous peoples in documentary filmmaking and anthropological research. The Wayana-Aparai project focused on food systems and traditional knowledge of flora and fauna. As well, Karen Hough (2008) published an MPhil thesis in ethnolinguistics on spatial perception in Wayana, taking up Tavares' urge for more theoretical elaboration of Wayana grammar.

== Language status ==
The vitality of the language is also variant in different areas. In Brazil it is considered moribund by Ethnologue, with grandparents being the only active users; however, Tavares (2005) mentions some villages on the Paru river where the language is in active use by children and adults, though the general trend is toward Aparai bilingualism and dominance. While Tavares does not consider the language healthy, it is possibly not moribund everywhere. According to Ethnologue, in French Guiana it is vigorous. In Suriname, it is developing, with all generations using it and some use of standardized literature.

== Phonology ==
The phonemic inventory of Wayana's consonants and vowels are presented below. That is, all distinct phonemes in Wayana. Several other segments are allophonically realized. For example, /h/ is realized as [ʃ] in some contexts. However, these are only surface realizations, and therefore not phonemes.

Consonants
		Labial	Coronal	Dorsal	Glottal
Occlusive	nasal	m	n		
Occlusive	oral	p	t	k	
Continuant	voiceless		s		h
Continuant	voiced	w	ɽ	j	

Modified from Grimes (1972), p. 48

Vowels
	Front	Central	Back
High	i	ɨ	u
Mid	e	ə	o
Low		a	

Modified from Grimes (1972), p. 48

== Morphology ==
=== Overview ===
Wayana's morphology, like that of other Cariban languages, is very rich, and makes extensive use of affixes. There are five major speech classes in Wayana: nouns, verbs, postpositions, adverbs, and particles. Each class can be distinguished by the presence (or absence) of specific affixes. Particles take no affixes, and are not morphologically bound. They "expres[s] many different meanings such as evidentiality, negation … [and] emotivity …". Barring particles, all members of each speech class are clearly recognizable by the affixes that they can take. In her "Grammar of Wayana", Tavares addresses the major aspects of each speech class in-depth. In regards to nouns, she discusses possessive, personal, and number affixes, Wayana pronouns, and special cases such as sound symbolic words. For verbs, she outlines the two "sets" of verbs found in Wayana ("Set I" –on which tense, aspect, and mood are marked through affixes, and t-V-(he) verbs – so-called due to their characteristic ambifix). She also addresses valence-changing morphemes, and gerundive verb forms. For postpositions, Tavares examines the personal prefixes, and spatial suffixes, as well as semantic classes of postpositions (including spatial postpositions). Derivational morphology is addressed for all classes, as class change (e.g. nominalization, verbalization) through affixes occurs often. Derivation is especially important for adverbs, as most adverbs are derived from other speech classes. Tavares presents the few underived adverbs that exist, as well the processes of adverbialization.

==== Possession ====
Possession in Wayana occurs in only one way. It consists of three elements – the possessed noun, the possessor, and the possessive suffix. The possessor comes before the possessed noun as either a free noun or free pronoun, or a personal prefix, and the possessed noun is necessarily inflected by one of four suffixes. For example, we have:

i-malija-n
3-knife-POSS
'his/her knife'

Nila-malija-n
Nila-knife-POSS
'Nila's knife'

*Nila i-malija-n

Data from Tavares (2005), pp. 121

Note: -n indicates the possessive suffix.

As we can see from 1c., the possessor cannot be expressed as both a personal prefix and a noun/pronoun, or else it is ungrammatical. The personal prefixes differ based on the succeeding environment. They are summarized in the table below:

	Preceding a vowel	Preceding a consonant	Preceding [w]
1st person	j-	ï-	ï-
2nd person	ëw-	ë-	ë-
1st+2nd person	k-, ik-	ku-	ku-
3rd person	ø	i-	a-, o-, e-
3rd person reflexive	t-	tï-	tï-

Modified from Tavares (2005), pp. 121

As mentioned previously, there are four allomorphs of the possessive suffix that inflect the possessed noun: -n(u), -(lï), -t(ï), -ø. The full form of the suffixes are realized only in some phonological environments. -n(u) is "the most productive" (Tavares, 2005, pp. 127) allomorph, as it is applied to loanwords (2c.). -t(ï-) can only be applied to three nouns (ëmi, ëlek, ëpi – 'face', 'boil', 'medicine'). Both -(lï) and -ø occur after specific nominalizing affixes; each occurs after a different nominalization affix (for example the ones in 3b., 5b, though there are several others).–ø also occurs after some inherently possessed nouns (5a.), and nouns with the devaluative suffix (-tpë, -tpï(lï)) (5c.).

-n(u)	i-pakolo-n 3-house-POSS 'his house'	j-emeku-nu psik 1-wrist-POSS small 'my small wrist'	ï-kuje-n 1-spoon-POSS 'my spoon' (kuje from Port. "colher")
-(lï)	ku-tamu-(lu); 1+2-grandfather-POSS 'our grandfather'	tulihi epï-ø-lï pëkë fruit.sp eat.vegetable-SpecEvntNmlz-POSS[1] about 'He was eating tulii' (Alawaka 027, as cited by Tavares)	
-t(ï)	his/her-face-POSS 'his/her face'		
-ø	ï-jumï-ø 1-father-POSS 'my father'	j-ïnïkï-topo-ø 1-sleep-CircnstNmlz-POSS 'my object for sleeping' (Jolokoc 488, as cited by Tavares)	ï-hapatu-tpïlip-ø 1-shoe-DVL-POSS 'my old, useless shoe'

Data from Tavares (2005) pp. 126 – 136

Importantly, nouns in Wayana fall under three classes, in regards to possessibility: unpossessable, optionally possessable, and inherently possessed. Unpossessable nouns do not take possessive prefixes or suffixes. Optionally possessed nouns are semantically diverse, and can occur in either possessed or unpossessed form (most examples given use optionally possessed nouns). Inherently possessed nouns "denote entities that stand in a stable, intrinsic relationship with another entity" (Tavares, 2005, pp. 136), and must always be possessed. Kinship terms (such as in 5a.) and some body parts fall under this category. Inherently possessed nouns often, but not always, take –ø as the possessive suffix.

==== Valence-changing morphemes ====
Valency refers to the number of participants that a verb takes. In Wayana, the subject of an intransitive sentence (S) is distinguished from subject of a transitive sentence (A) and the object of a transitive sentence (O). The valency on a verb stem can be decreased or increased by using certain affixes. Valence can be decreased by only one affix – the detransitivizing prefix – but can be increased by four different suffixes. Causational morphemes (such as the Wayana –po) are not considered as valence-increasing, since the participants they introduce are optional.

The detransitivizing prefix is realized as e-, ëh-, ët-, depending on the succeeding phonological environment. The prefix can be taken by a transitive verb stem to detransitivize it, so that only one argument can be taken; the verb is then "marked as an SA intransitive verb" (Tavares, 2005, pp. 253), meaning that it only takes one argument, which is the subject and agent. For example, 6a. and b. demonstrate how a verb stem that usually requires another participant can be satisfied by just one acting as an agent, in the presence of the detransitivizing prefix.

Verb stem	Gloss	Detransitivized verb stem	Gloss
6a. ulu	'talk to O'	ëtulu	'talk'
maa ku-tamulu-ø n-ët-ulu-ø j-epe-ø So 1+2-grandfather-POSS 3S.A-DET-talk.to.O-REC 1-friend-POSS 'So, our grandfather has talked, my friend.'

Data from Tavares (2005), pp. 254

Conversely, intransitive verbs can be made to take new participants by using transtivizing suffixes: -ka, -nëp(ka), -nïp(ka), ma, and lë. These suffixes only "occur on SO intransitive stems", "adding a new nuclear participant to the event described by the verb" (Tavares 2005, pp. 254). The new participant becomes the agent and subject of the transitive sentence, and the old S, the object. The suffixes do not occur on SA intransitive verbs (like the ones formed by the detransitivizing suffix), as they cannot be transitivized.

The distribution of these suffixes is not well described, and seems to be mostly based on phonology of the surrounding environment. As can be seen below, the different suffixes behave very similarly.

Verb stem	Gloss	Suffix	Transitivized verb stem	Gloss
7a. utat(ï)	'be/get lost'	-ka	utatka	'make O get lost'
7b. uwa	'dance'	-nïp(i)~- nïp(ka)	uwanïp(ï)~uwanïp(ka)	'make O dance'
majpuli m-elemi-nëpï-ø tapir 2A.3O-Sing-Transvzr-REC 'You sang the Maipuli [a song]'

Data from Tavares (2005), pp. 255–256

The root elemi, seen in 7c. can also take the transitivizing suffix –ka, as well as –nëp(i), but this causes a different meaning, for an unknown reason.

== Syntax ==
=== Case and agreement ===
Wayana's case system presents "an … unprecedented type of split ergativ[ity]" (Tavares, 2005, pp. 412), where there are two verb types – Set I and t-V-(h)e. The former presents an unclassified mixed system (sometimes analyzed as active-stative, or inverse) while the latter presents ergative case. In both verb sets, the subject of an intransitive sentence (S) is distinguished from subject of a transitive sentence (A) and the object of a transitive sentence (O), as mentioned previously. There is no grammatical property that seems to trigger the use of one set over the other. Both systems can "occur independent of tense, with all persons … in main clauses, and with all verb stems" (Tavares, 2005, pp. 234), and the choice of verb set is perhaps dependent on discourse factors.

==== Set I verbs ====
Set I verbs in Wayana take a variety of personal prefixes, marking first, second, dual (first and second), and third person. The prefix used differs based on the valency of the verb in question, and person(s) being marked.

For transitive verbs, one prefix marks both subject (A), and object (O). The different prefixes, based on which person A and O are marking, are below.

Personal Prefixes on Transitive Verbs
	1st-person subject (1A)	2nd-person subject (2A)	1st + 2nd-person subject (1+2A)	3rd-person subject (3A)
1st-person object (1O)		2A1O k-/ku-		3A1O ï -/j-
2nd-person object (2O)	1A2O kuw-/ku-/k-			3A2O ë-/ëw-
1st- + 2nd-person object (1+2O)				3A1+2O ku-, k-
3rd-person object (3O)	1A3O w-	2A3O m-	1+2A3O (ku)h-/kut, ku-, k-	3A3O n-/mën-/kun-/pre-verbal object[1]

Modified from Tavares (2005), pp. 206

When one of the arguments of the transitive verb is a speech act participant (SAP) – either first person, second person or dual person (both first and second person) – and the other argument is a third person, the personal prefix differs based on whether the speech act participant is acting on the third person (is A), or is being acted on by the third person (is O). Often, the first situation is termed direct, and the latter inverse. This is demonstrated by the differing prefixes for 1A3O (direct) and 3A1O (inverse), as well as 2A3O (direct) and 3A2O (inverse).

This distinction between direct and inverse prefixes is crucial when examining intransitive verbs. While each prefix marks the subject (S), as the chart below shows, there are two distinct sets of personal prefixes for each SAP person. One set matches the direct prefixes in transitive verbs, and the other set matches inverse prefixes. Thus, the S is split, and referred to either as SA or SO, depending on which transitive prefix set the intransitive prefix resembles. SA corresponds to the direct prefixes, and SO, the inverse. For example, 1SA prefix w- is the same as the 1A3O direct transitive prefix.

Personal prefixes on intransitive Verbs
	SA	SO
1S	w-	ï -/j-
2S	m-	ë-/ëw-
1 + 2S	(ku)h-/kut, ku-, k-	(ku)h-/kut, ku-, k-
3S	n-/mën-/kun-	

To illustrate, below are two example of sentences using Set I transitive (8) and intransitive verbs, with SA (9a) and SO arguments (9b) :

w-ipanakma-ø
1A.3O-hear.O-REC
'I heard it'

kola ekalë-ø øepe-ø ja
necklace give-REC 3-friend-POSS DAT
'(She) gave necklace to her friend'

w-ëtulu-ø
1S.A-eat-REC
'I ate'

1+2SO-sing-REC
'Me and you sang'

Data from Tavares (2005), pp. 208 & 426

There have been a few analyses proposed to explain Wayana's person marking, including active-stative. If one focuses on the first and second person prefixes, that might be reasonable, as S is marked either as A or O, a characteristic of active-stative languages. Yet this analysis holds for first and second person only – the other persons (i.e. dual person) "do not present such a binary opposite" (Tavares, 2005, pp. 208); as well, the "semantic basis is lacking" (Tavares, 2005, pp. 208). Other analyses include: inverse (Gildea, 1998, as cited by Tavares) and portmanteau prefixes (Hoff, 1995, as cited by Tavares). Instead, it is likely that the set I verbs in Wayana are of a mixed system that is not fully encompassed by one single analysis.

==== t-V-(h)e verbs ====
Verbs in this set, characterized by the ambifix t- -(h)e around the verb root, are less complicated than set I verbs in regards to case. They are not inflected for person, tense, evidentiality, or number, and, as mentioned, present ergative case marking. The intransitive subject, S, and transitive object, O are both unmarked (having absolutive case), while the transitive object is marked for ergative case with the ergative morpheme, ja. Two examples follow:

malonme ï-woka-nu epulu-ø te-pïkëlë-he pahina ja
then 1-fishhook-POSS pole-POSS T-Break.O-HE fish.sp ERG
'Then, a pasina (fish) broke the pole of my fishhook'

tï-ka-he ïwu
T-say-HE 1.PRO
'I said'

kopë telenu t-umëkï-he
rain huge T-come-HE
'A huge rain came'

Data from Tavares (2005), pp. 231

In the transitive sentence, 10., the A, which is the pasina fish, is marked as such by the ja ergative morpheme. The O, the speaker's fishhook pole, is unmarked. In the intransitive sentences, 11. and 12., the S (the speaker, and 'a huge rain', respectively) are completely unmarked, just as the O is in 10..

Wayana thus shows split ergativity, with one set of verbs presenting ergative case, and the other, a mixed system. Wayana is a special case in split ergativity, since it seems that the two sets are not grammatically or semantically triggered, and occur freely in discourse. For example, both 13. and 14. use the verb root (ënepï/'bring'), yet 13. is marked as a t- -(h)e verb, and 14. is marked as a set I.

ulu t-ënepï-he kilili ja
manioc T-bring.O-HE Kilili ERG
'Kilili brought manioc'

m-enepï-ø
2A.3O-bring.O-REC
'You brought it'

Data from Tavares (2005), pp. 201, 202

Even another Cariban language, Tiriyó, with split ergativity (and similar person-marking), "restrict[s]" t-V-(h)e verbs (the Tiriyo cognate) to the remote past" (Tavares, 2005, pp. 234), making Wayana's case system quite unique, even amongst Cariban languages.

== Semantics ==
=== Tense ===
Wayana explicitly marks tense only on set I verbs, where tense morphemes are bound with aspect, modality, and number. Broadly, there are two categories of tenses – non-past, and past, which includes recent past, distant past, and habitual past; all tenses are marked with affixes. Aspect is not marked on Wayana verbs, but is "impl[ied] to different degrees" (Tavares, 2005, pp. 211) in each tense, or else given by context or other morphemes. Below is a chart of the suffixes for each tense.

Tense	Suffix
Non-past	-ja
Recent past	-ø
Distant past	-ne/kun-
Habitual past	-(j)(ë)mëhneja, -(h)e

Modified from Tavares (2005), pp. 210

The non-past suffix, -ja, can refer to future events, facts about the world, and non-past sentences can encode aspect, such as imperfective habitual or continuous aspect. The examples below demonstrate how habitual aspect is marked through another morpheme (15.), how near or distant future is marked through context (saying "in a minute" versus "next year") (16a., 16b.). Additionally, in 17., since perfective aspect is not explicitly marked, the non-past can be understood as either imperfect and continuous ('I am making bread'), or perfect ('I will make bread'), based on the context of speech.

ituwakï pakolo-nu ta-kë hepï w-ïtë-ja-he
Indian house-POSS in.permanent.LOC-into HAB 1S.A-go-NPST-SapAff
'I always go to the House of the Indians'

ï-wenata-ja-he pitë
1S.O-vomit-NPST-SapAff in.a.minute
'I am about to vomit'

akono weji po-ø w-ëh-epa-ja-he {estados unidos} po-ø
another year on.supported-on 1S.A-DET-teach.O-NPST-SapAff {United States} on.supported-on
'Next year, I will study in the United States'

ulu w-ekeju-ja-he
bread 1A.3O-make.bread-NPST-SapAff
'I am making bread' or 'I will make bread'

Data from Tavares (2005), pp. 212–213

The recent past suffix, -ø, refers to "events that took place in the past twenty -four hours", including "events that have just occurred", "events that have happened hours ago, and events that happened in the previous day" (Tavares 2005, pp. 215). 11) and 12) provide examples for this tense:

n-i-lëmëpï-ø
3S-Them-die-REC
'He just died (a few minutes ago)'

eluwa pepta kaikuhi uwë-ø kokone
man big jaguar kill.O-REC yesterday
'A man killed a big jaguar yesterday'

Data from Tavares (2005), pp. 215

The distant past (referring to an event that occurred more than 24 hours before speech) is marked by two different affixes, -ne and kun-. Their distribution is based on the person of the verb's arguments. –ne occurs when one or both of the verb's arguments is an SAP, or when there is a free (pro)noun object before the verb in a 3A3O configuration. Kun- "occurs elsewhere" and marks third person as well as distant past. 20. gives an example of the distant past, using the –ne suffix (as there is a preverbal free noun O), and 21 gives an example of kun-.

joloko ene-ne anakali
evil.spirit see.O-DIST Anakali
'Anakali saw a Jolok'

malonme kun-ene
Then 3A.3O.DIST-see.O
'Then, he saw it.'

Data from Tavares (2005), pp. 216

All past affixes only "imply perfective meaning" (Tavares 2005, pp. 212) on their own. However, two habitual suffixes can mark habitual aspect in the distant past. They are -(j)(ë)mëhneja and -(h)e. The former takes the same personal prefixes as non-past forms do, while the latter takes no personal prefixes, though they seem to be identical, semantically – marking a repeated event in the past.

22. and 23. provide examples of -(j)(ë)mëhneja and -(h)e, respectively.

akuli je-ø ïlï-ëmëtneja malija-me
agouti tooth-POSS make.O-HABPST knife-Attrb
'They used to make agouti's teeth into knives'

ka-he kuni
say-HABPST grandmother
'Grandma used to say.'

Data from Tavares (2005) pp. 218, 237

While set I verbs mark tense, t-V-(h)e verbs do not have morphology to do so. They do, however, refer to events in the past, present, and future, with different aspects. Tavares does not make it clear in her grammar how those events are referred to, but likely it is through context, and other morphemes, such as the habitual morpheme hepï (from the data presented on Tavares 2005, pp. 232).

[1] This can be a free pro(noun) that is the O on a transitive verb. See (1b) for an example. Also note that the differing realizations of the prefixes are phonologically conditioned or based on tense (in the case of 3A3O)
