= Lawa River (South America) =

Lawa
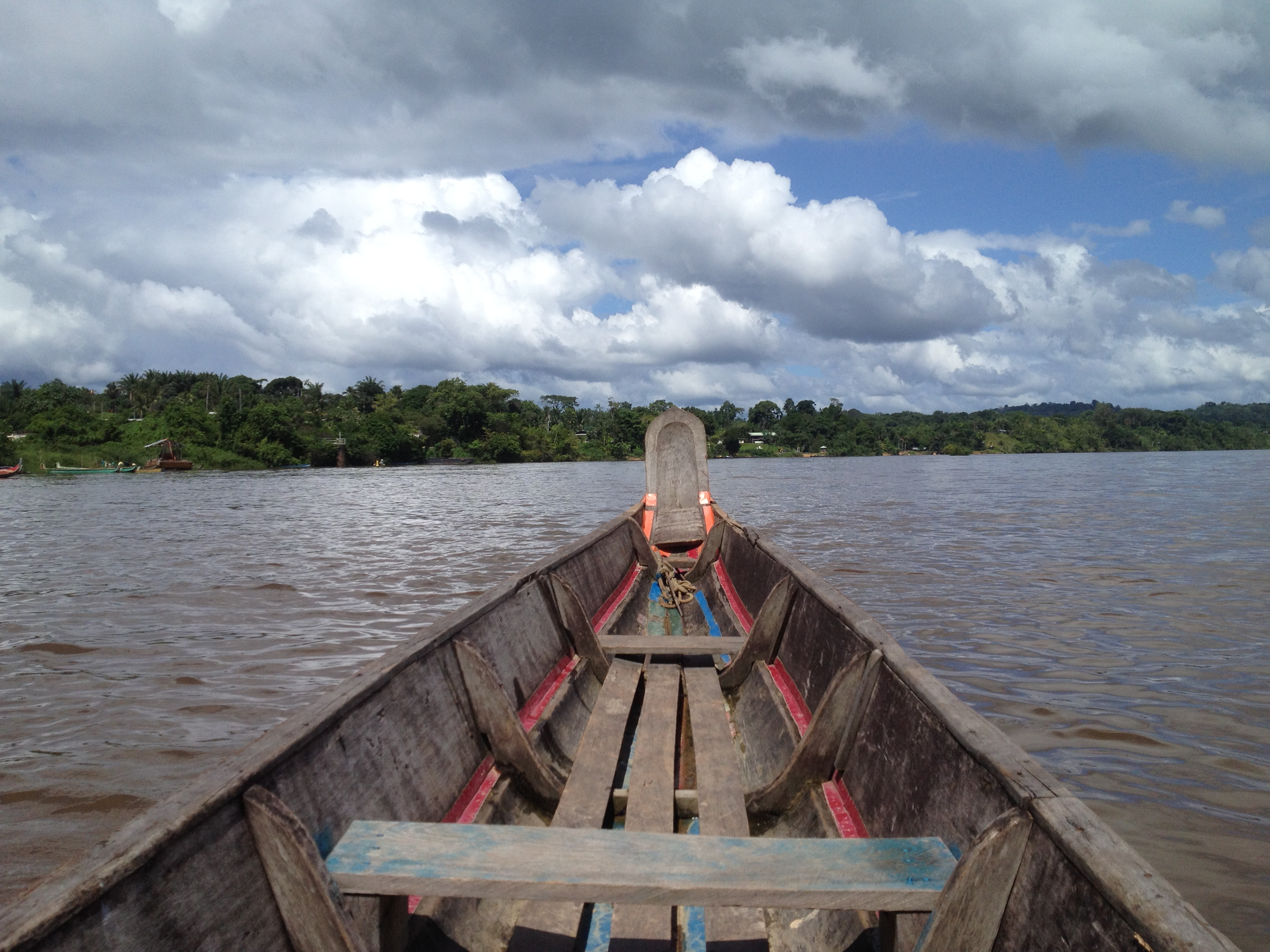

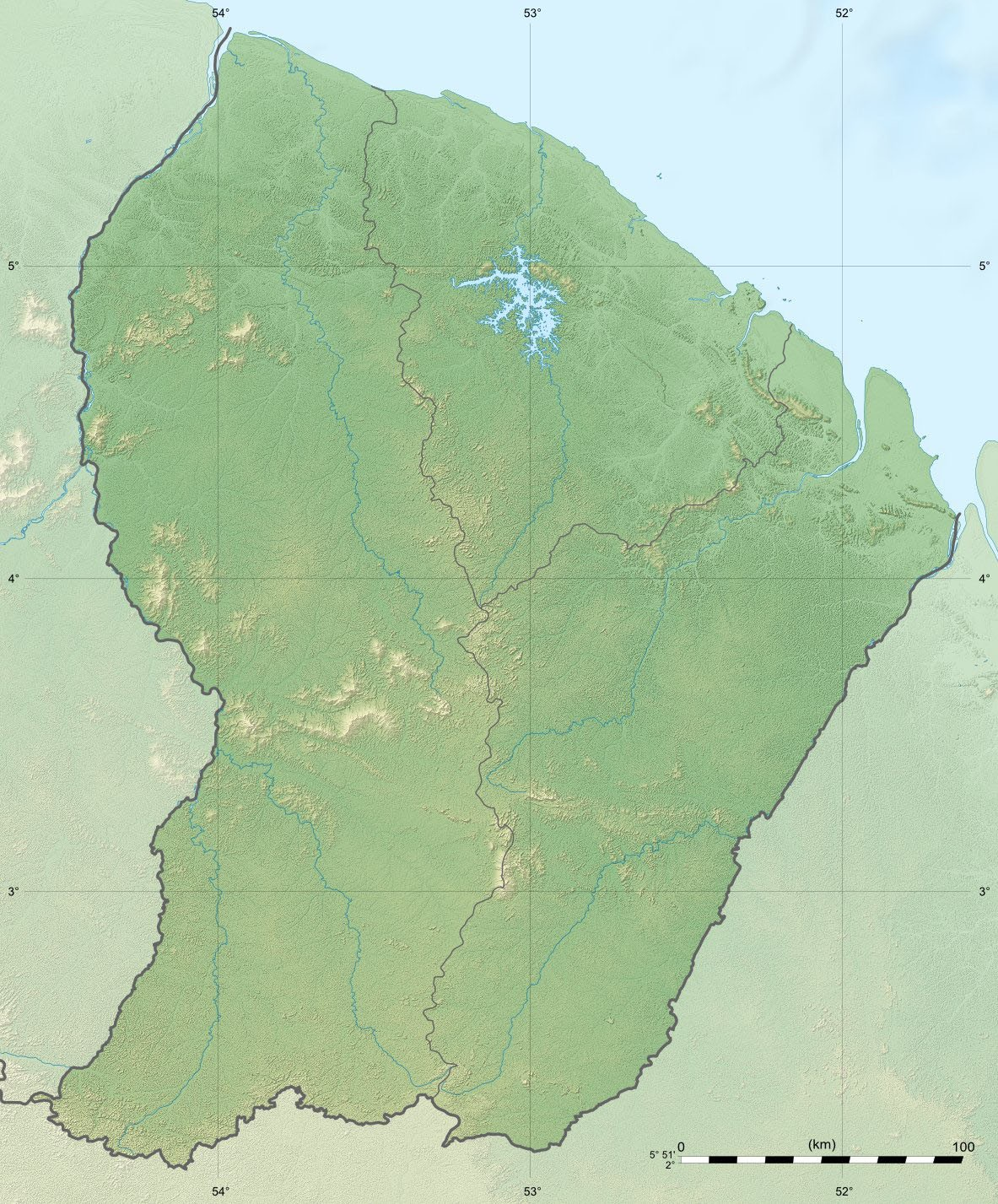
- Location within French Guiana Location within Suriname

Location
- Countries: Suriname and French Guiana

Physical characteristics
- Source
  - location: Confluence of Litani and Malani
  - coordinates: 3.2959°N 54.0680°W
- Mouth
  - location: Maroni
  - coordinates: 4.4194°N 54.4295°W

Basin features
- Progression: Maroni→ Atlantic Ocean

The Lawa is a river of South America. It forms part of the international boundary between Suriname and French Guiana. It is formed by the confluence of the Litani and Malani. Downstream from its confluence with the Tapanahony, it is called Maroni. The total length of Litani, Lawa and Maroni is 612 km (380 mi). Important tributaries are the Tampok, Inini and Grand Abounami.

After gold was discovered on the banks of the Lawa River, the governor of Suriname, Cornelis Lely, ordered the construction of the Lawa Railway in 1902. Construction of the railway line was halted when gold production in the area proved disappointing.

== See also ==
- List of rivers of Suriname
- List of rivers of French Guiana
