= List of defunct airlines of Estonia =

This is a list of defunct airlines of Estonia.

Airline	Image	IATA	ICAO	Callsign	Commenced operations	Ceased operations	Notes
Aero Airlines		EE	EAY	REVAL	2002	2008	
Aeronaut					1921	1927	
Air Livonia			LIV	LIVONIA	1994	2006	Previously Baltic Aeroservice
Avies			AIA	AVIES	1991	2016	
Elk Estonian Aviation Company		S8	ELK		1992	2001	
Enimex			ENI	ENIMEX	1994	2008	
Estonian Air & Estonian Air Regional		OV	ELL	ESTONIAN	1991	2015	Went bankrupt
FLYLAL Charters Estonia			ELC		2009	2010	Small Planet Airlines of Lithuania subsidiary Renamed Small Planet Airlines Estonia
Nordica		ND	NDA	NORDICA AIR	2015	2024	Trading name of Nordic Aviation Group A.S. operations
Small Planet Airlines Estonia			ESC		2010	2012	Small Planet Airlines of Lithuania subsidiary Previously FLYLAL Charters Estonia
Smartlynx Airlines Estonia			MYX	TALLINN CAT	2013	2025	SmartLynx Airlines of Latvia subsidiary

== See also ==
- List of airlines of Estonia
- List of airports in Estonia
