= ELK Airways Flight 1007 =

2001 aviation accident in Estonia

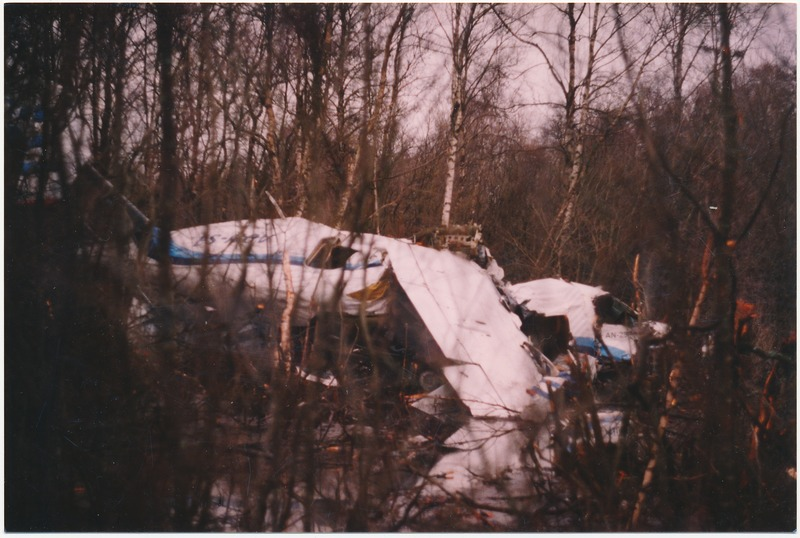
- Wreckage of the aircraft

Accident
- Date: 23 November 2001
- Summary: Controlled flight into terrain due to pilot error
- Site: Near Kärdla Airport, Hiiu County, Estonia; 58°58′27.1″N 22°51′12″E

Aircraft
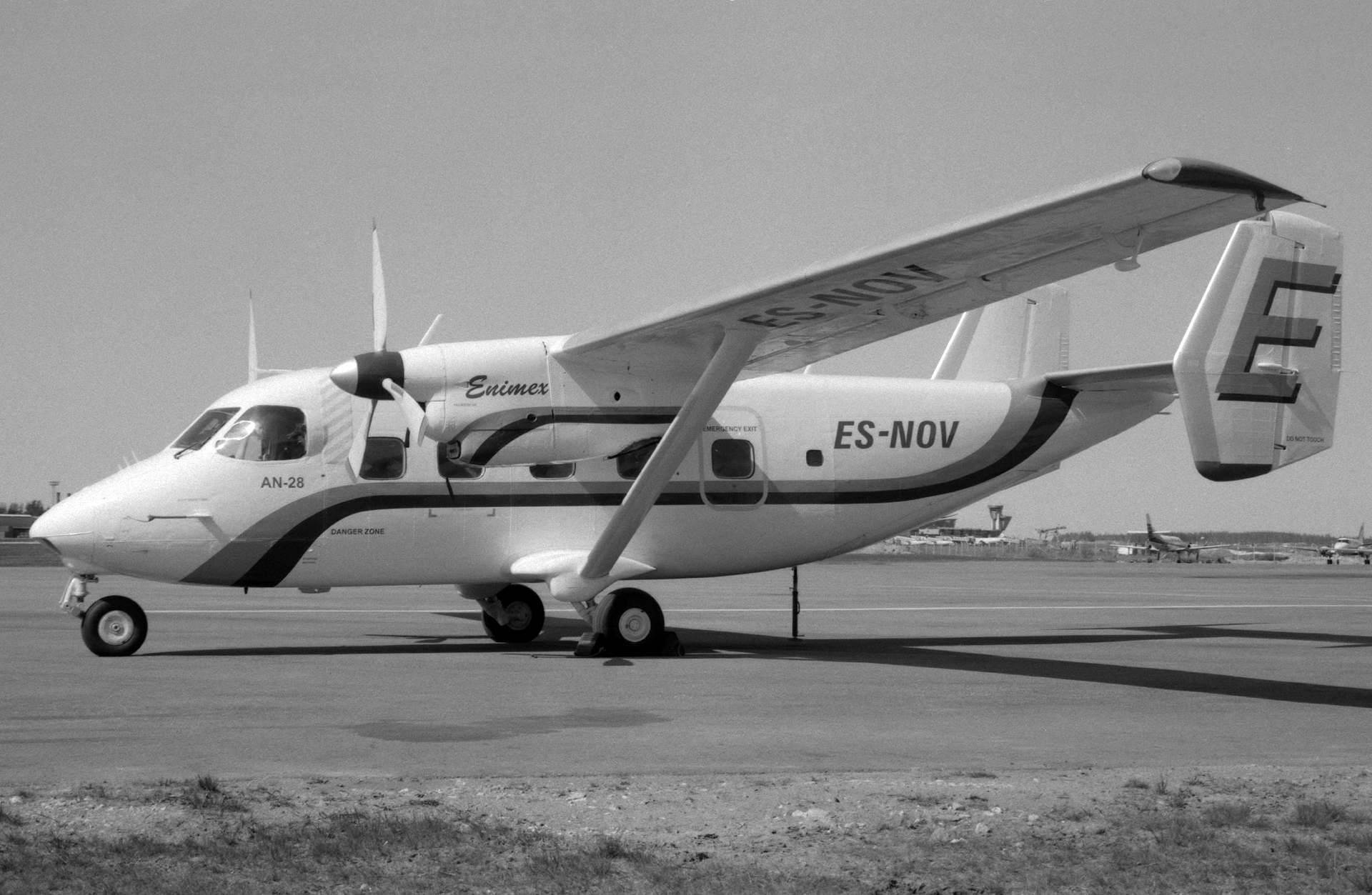
- ES-NOV, the aircraft involved in the accident, pictured in 2000
- Aircraft type: Antonov An-28
- Operator: Enimex on behalf of ELK Airways
- IATA flight No.: S81007
- ICAO flight No.: ELK1007
- Call sign: ELKA 1007
- Registration: ES-NOV
- Flight origin: Tallinn Airport, Harju County, Estonia
- Destination: Kärdla Airport, Hiiu County, Estonia
- Occupants: 17
- Passengers: 14
- Crew: 3
- Fatalities: 2
- Injuries: 14
- Survivors: 15

On 23 November 2001, ELK Airways Flight 1007, an Antonov An-28 leased from Enimex, crashed on approach to Kärdla Airport, Hiiu County, after a domestic flight in Estonia from Tallinn Airport. Two of the aircraft's 17 occupants were killed. The investigation on the accident found out that the crash was a case of controlled flight into terrain, caused mainly by the crew's decision of switching from an instrument approach to visual approach, a decision that was made to avoid icing conditions. The accident is the only fatal passenger plane crash in the history of independent Estonia.

== Aircraft and crew ==
The aircraft involved in the accident was an Antonov An-28 registered as ES-NOV and manufactured in 1986. The aircraft was owned by the Estonian airline Enimex and leased to ELK Airways to perform its scheduled services between Tallinn and Hiiumaa island. Aircraft leasing was one of the activities in which the airline Enimex was specialized. On board there were three crew members, the two pilots and a flight attendant. The 46 years old male captain Aleksandr Nikolaev had a total of 4494 flight hours, of which 1437 on the An-28, he was said to be an experienced pilot, who also flew on other soviet planes like the Tupolev Tu-134, the Yakovlev Yak-40 and the Antonov An-72. The other two crew members were the 23 years old male first officer Alexander Golovko and the 27 years old female flight attendant Leena Stefutina.

== Accident ==
Flight 1007 departed Tallinn Airport at around 6:05 pm local time, headed for a short domestic flight to Kärdla Airport on Hiiumaa island. On board there were three crew members and 14 passengers, of which 13 were Estonian nationals and one was a Norwegian national. The aircraft took off and climbed normally to flight level FL060. The aircraft contacted Kärdla Airport air traffic control at 6:19 pm, and requested weather information. Winds were pretty high, with peaks of 44 km/h, visibility was good, at around 8 kilometers, cloud ceiling was at around 370 meters and temperature at 0 degrees Celsius. Icing conditions were highly possible due to the low temperature and high humidity levels. Soon after the aircraft was instructed to descend to flight level FL014. During the continuation of the approach the crew of Flight 1007 switched from continuing an instrument approach to a visual approach, to avoid the icing conditions present in the area. At 6:03 pm the aircraft impacted treetops and crashed into a marshland located about one and a half kilometers south-est of the airport runway. The marsh absorbed some of the impact forces and prevented more blunt force fatalities and the development of a post-crash fire, since the aircraft fuel tanks didn't rupture. A 49 years old passenger died on impact, and 15 of the 16 survivors were injured, of which two, the first officer and a 10 years old boy, were serious. Five of the injured were airlifted to Tallinn, including two children that were brought to a pediatric hospital, and five were brought to an hospital in Kärdla. The 10-year-old boy, who initially survived in serious conditions, died of his injuries in hospital on November 29, bringing the final death toll of the crash to two.

== Aftermath ==
In the afternoon of November 23, the Government of Estonia met in an extraordinary session, summoned by the minister Toivo Jürgenson, to discuss about the accident, and during which a government commission on the investigation of the crash was formed. Tõnu Naestema, vice secretary of the Ministry of roads and communications, was appointed as the commission president. Kärdla Airport, soon after the crash, issued a hotline phone number for the relatives of those on board Flight 1007. Estonian president Arnold Rüütel expressed his condolences to the victims of the accident, and wished a speedy recovery to the injured. Nearly 92000 estonian kroons were donated to the victims of the accident. The Estonian Civil Aviation Administration grounded all Antonov An-28s registered in the country from November 24 to November 26 for checks.

== Investigation ==
The final report on the crash was released by the Estonian Civil Aviation Administration just over two months after the accident, in February 2002. The report found out that soon after takeoff the aircraft anti-ice system activated, sending alarms to the cockpit, and remained in this state for most of the flight. In the meantime the ice was melted by the aircraft anti-ice system, but the captain thought that it was still present, so during approach he switched from an instrument procedure to a visual procedure to avoid areas with worse icing condition, and so the eventual further accumulation of ice. The report was sent to the Lääne County attorney to analyze it, and find eventual responsibilities of the accident.

A trail against pilot Aleksandr Nikolaev was initiated in March 2004 by the General Attorney of Estonia, which accused him of violating the air safety norms, resulting in the crash. After a years-long trial the case archived in 2011, since there was no more interest in the continuation of it, and Nikolaev was subsequently acquitted.
