= ELK Airways =

Airline in Estonia

Eesti Lennukompanii
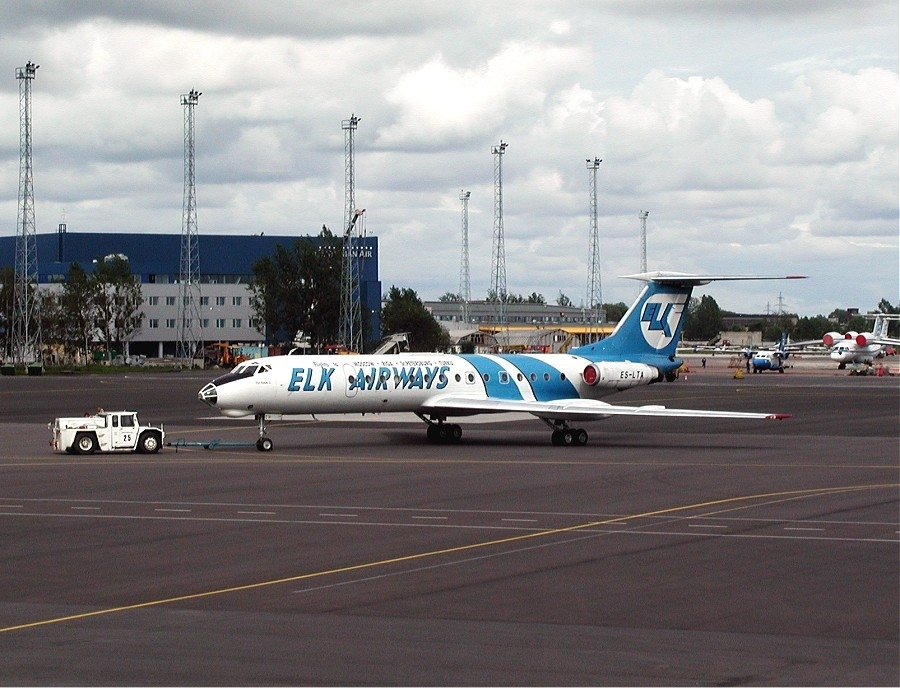
- Tupolev Tu-134
- Founded: 10 October 1991
- Ceased operations: 31 December 2001
- Hubs: Tallinn Airport
- Fleet size: 4
- Headquarters: Tallinn, Estonia

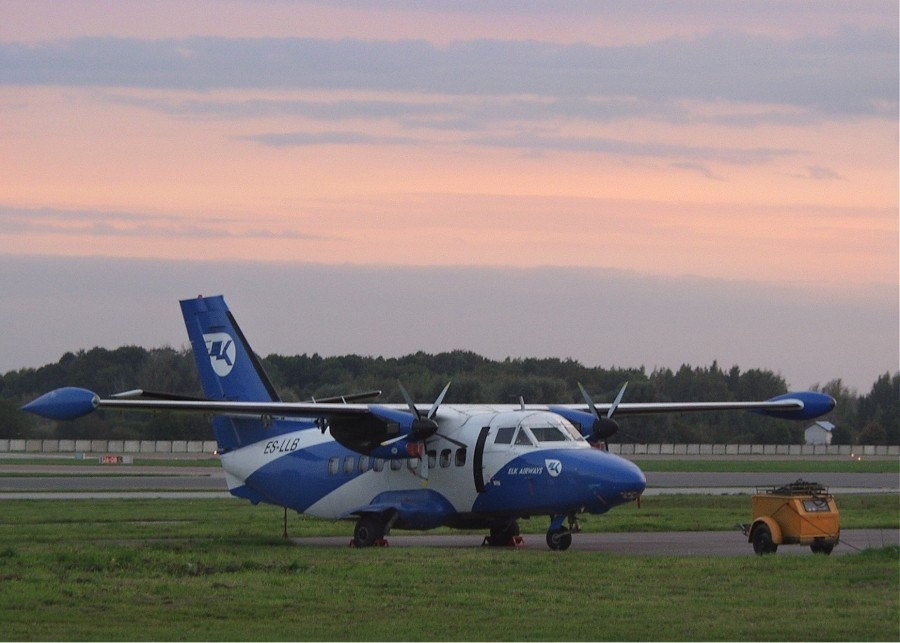
Let L-410

ELK-Eesti Lennukompanii (ELK-Estonian Aviation Co.) was an Estonian airline which operated from 1991 to 2001.

In the beginning, ELK operated three Tupolev Tu-154 jetliners; later Let L-410, BAe Jetstream 31 and Tupolev Tu-134A aircraft were used. The concern was also known with ELK Airways brand.

On 23 November 2001, an ELK Antonov An-28 crashed into trees located shortly before the runway at Kärdla Airport, killing two passengers. The aircraft was being leased from Enimex. It was a tangible sign that the company was having internal problems. Indeed, shortly thereafter, on December 31st, all flight operations were halted and never resumed. At the time of closure the fleet consisted of 1 Antonov An-26, 2 Let L-410, 1 Tupolev Tu-134A and 1 Tupolev Tu-154M.
