= Lawa Antino Airstrip =

Airstrip in Suriname

- IATA: none; ICAO: SMAN

Summary
- Airport type: Public
- Operator: Luchtvaartdienst Suriname
- Serves: Benzdorp
- Elevation AMSL: 740 ft / 226 m
- Coordinates: 3°37′12″N 54°08′35″W

Map
- Location in Suriname

Runways
Direction	Length		Surface
Direction	m	ft	Surface
11/29	1,155	3,789	Gravel
- Sources: Bing Maps Antino Gold Project

Lawa Antino Airstrip (ICAO: SMAN) is an airstrip serving the gold mining concessions near the town of Benzdorp in Suriname. The runway is 9 kilometres (5.6 mi) southwest of the town.

== Charters and destinations ==
Charter airlines serving this airport are:

Airlines	Destinations
Blue Wing Airlines	Charter: Paramaribo–Zorg en Hoop
Gum Air	Charter: Paramaribo–Zorg en Hoop
United Air Services	Charter: Paramaribo–Zorg en Hoop
Vortex Aviation Suriname	Charter: Paramaribo–Zorg en Hoop

== Notable disasters ==
On April 3, 2008, an Antonov AN-28 airplane (PZ-TSO) operated by Blue Wing Airlines crashed upon landing at the Lawa Antino Airport near Benzdorp in which 19 people in total (2 crew, 17 passengers) were killed. The Lawa Antino airport is 9 kilometres (5.6 mi) west of Benzdorp.

== See also ==
- List of airports in Suriname
- Transport in Suriname
