= Eneli =

Female given name

- Gender: Female
- Language: Estonian
- Name day: 21 April

Origin
- Region of origin: Estonia

Other names
- Derived: from Ene and Eliisabet
- Related names: Ene, Eneken, Enel, Enelin

Eneli is an Estonian feminine given name; from a compound of the given names Ene and Eliisabet.

As of 1 January 2023, 502 women in Estonia have the first name Eneli, making it the 327th most popular female name in the country. The name is most commonly found in Rapla County, where 7.65 per 10,000 women bear the name. Individuals bearing the name Eneli include:

- Eneli Kutter (born 1991), footballer
- Eneli Jefimova (born 2006), swimmer
- Eneli Sarv (born 1986), footballer
