= Avies =

Estonian travel company and former airline

Avies Lennukompanij AS - Avies Air Co.

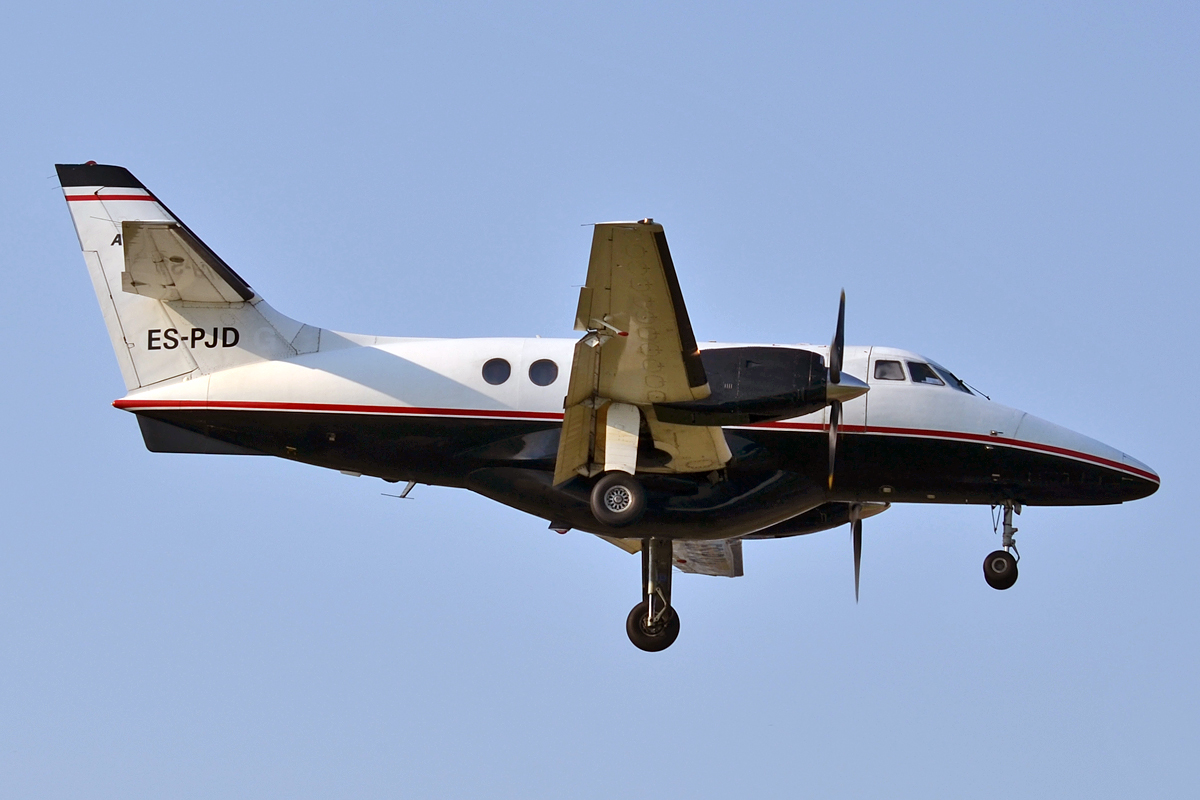
- BAe Jetstream 31
IATA	ICAO	Call sign
—	AIA	AVIES
- Founded: 1991
- Ceased operations: 2016
- Hubs: Tallinn Airport
- Fleet size: 11
- Destinations: 3
- Headquarters: Tallinn, Estonia

Avies Lennukompanij AS was an airline headquartered in Tallinn, Estonia owned by the tour operator of the same name. Its main operating base was Lennart Meri Tallinn Airport. Avies operated scheduled flights from Tallinn to Kärdla and Kuressaare in Estonia.

== History ==
Avies was established in 1991 and started operations in that same year: charter and air taxi services. Schedules were added in 1999 and the airline flew also three domestic routes inside Sweden.

All domestic flights in Sweden were halted in March 2015, due to contract cancellation by Swedish authorities. Avies was declared bankrupt by court on 26 June 2015, but it continued to operate as before. However, the remaining flights from Lennart Meri Tallinn Airport to Kuressaare Airport, Kärdla Airport and Stockholm-Arlanda were suspended on 1 April 2016, after the airline's operating license had been withdrawn by Estonian Civil Aviation Administration for a duration of six months over safety concerns.

== Destinations ==
Until its license has been revoked in April 2016, Avies served the following scheduled destinations:

Estonia

- Tallinn – Lennart Meri Tallinn Airport base
- Kärdla – Kärdla Airport
- Kuressaare – Kuressaare Airport

Sweden

- Stockholm – Stockholm Arlanda Airport

== Fleet ==
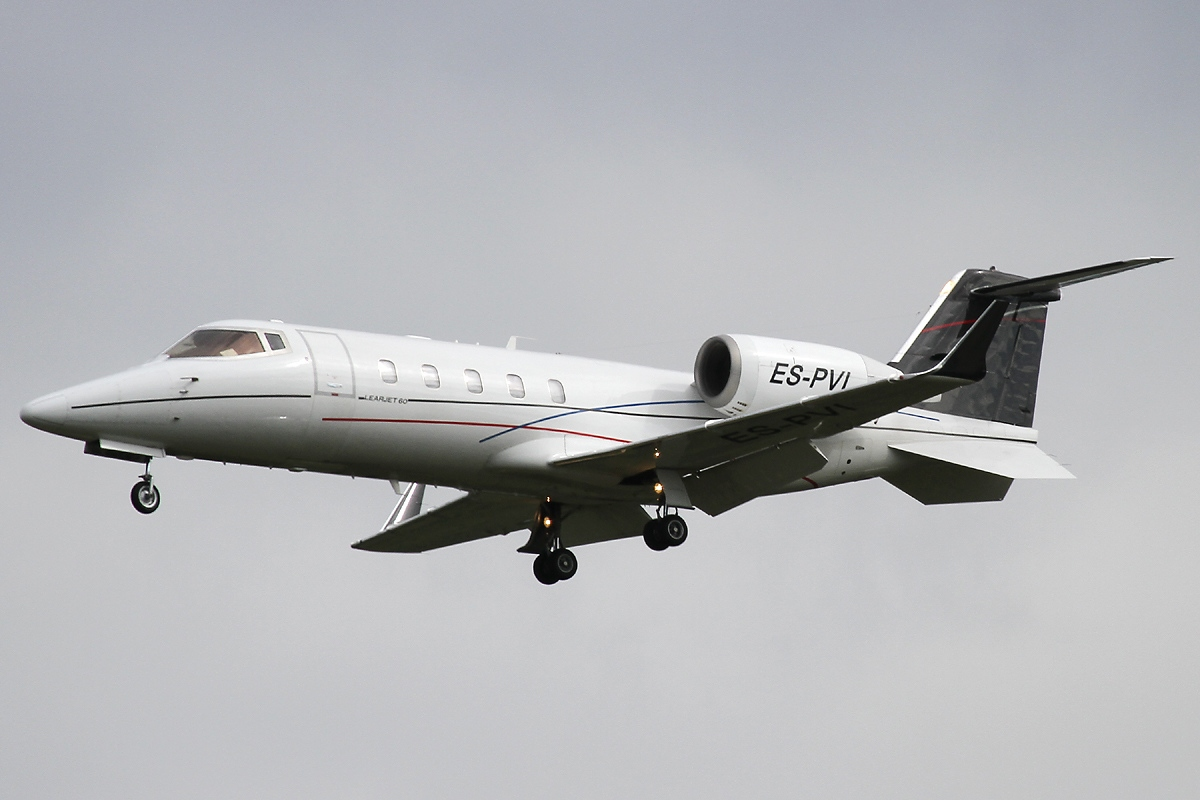
Bombardier Learjet 60

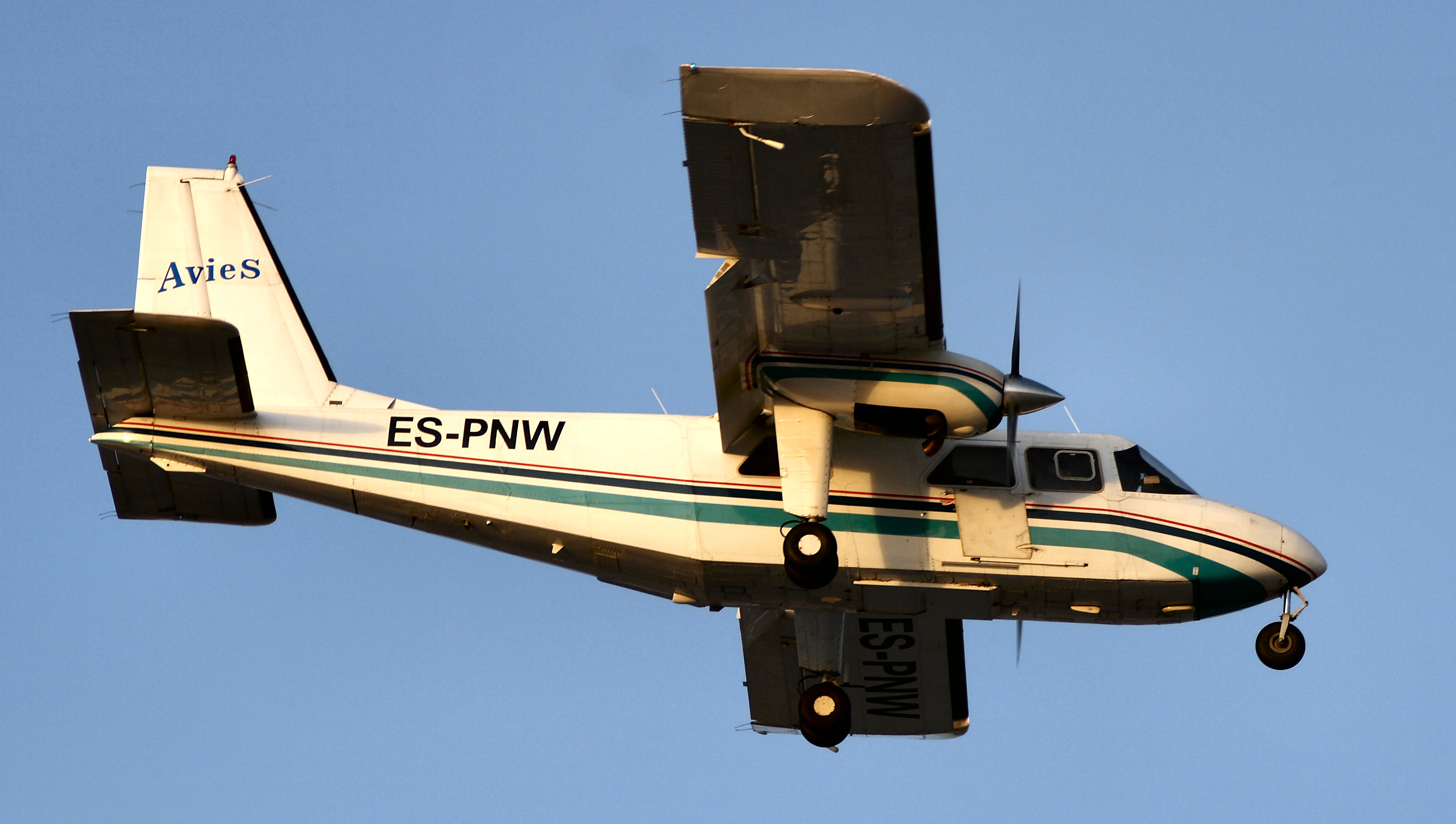
Avies BN-2T

As of December 2014, the Avies fleet included the following aircraft.

- 1 Bombardier Learjet 31A
- 1 Bombardier Learjet 55C
- 2 Bombardier Learjet 60
- 4 BAe Jetstream 31
- 1 BAe Jetstream 32
- 1 Hawker Beechcraft 750
- 1 Let L-410 Turbolet

== Accidents and incidents ==
- On 13 February 2013, a Jetstream belonging to Avies landed at Pajala with two wheels outside the paved runway. No damage to the aircraft.
- On 3 May 2013, a Jetstream belonging to Avies got trouble with both engines after departure from Sveg. They had too low RPM, but there was no warning from the plane system for that. The pilots returned to Sveg and managed to get better power from the engines before landing.
- On 31 January 2014, a Jetstream belonging to Avies skidded off the snow-covered runway at Torsby Airport.
