= Paope Nature Reserve =

Protected area in Estonia

- Location within Estonia
- Location: Estonia
- Nearest city: Kärdla
- Coordinates: 58°58′15″N 22°25′44″E
- Area: 3,064 ha (7,570 acres)

Paope Nature Reserve is a nature reserve situated on Hiiumaa island in western Estonia, in Hiiu County.

The nature reserve is situated in an area of geological variation and was created to protect the biodiversity of the area. Hiiumaa's highest point (68 metres above sea level) is located in the nature reserve.
