= Benno Richard Ottow =

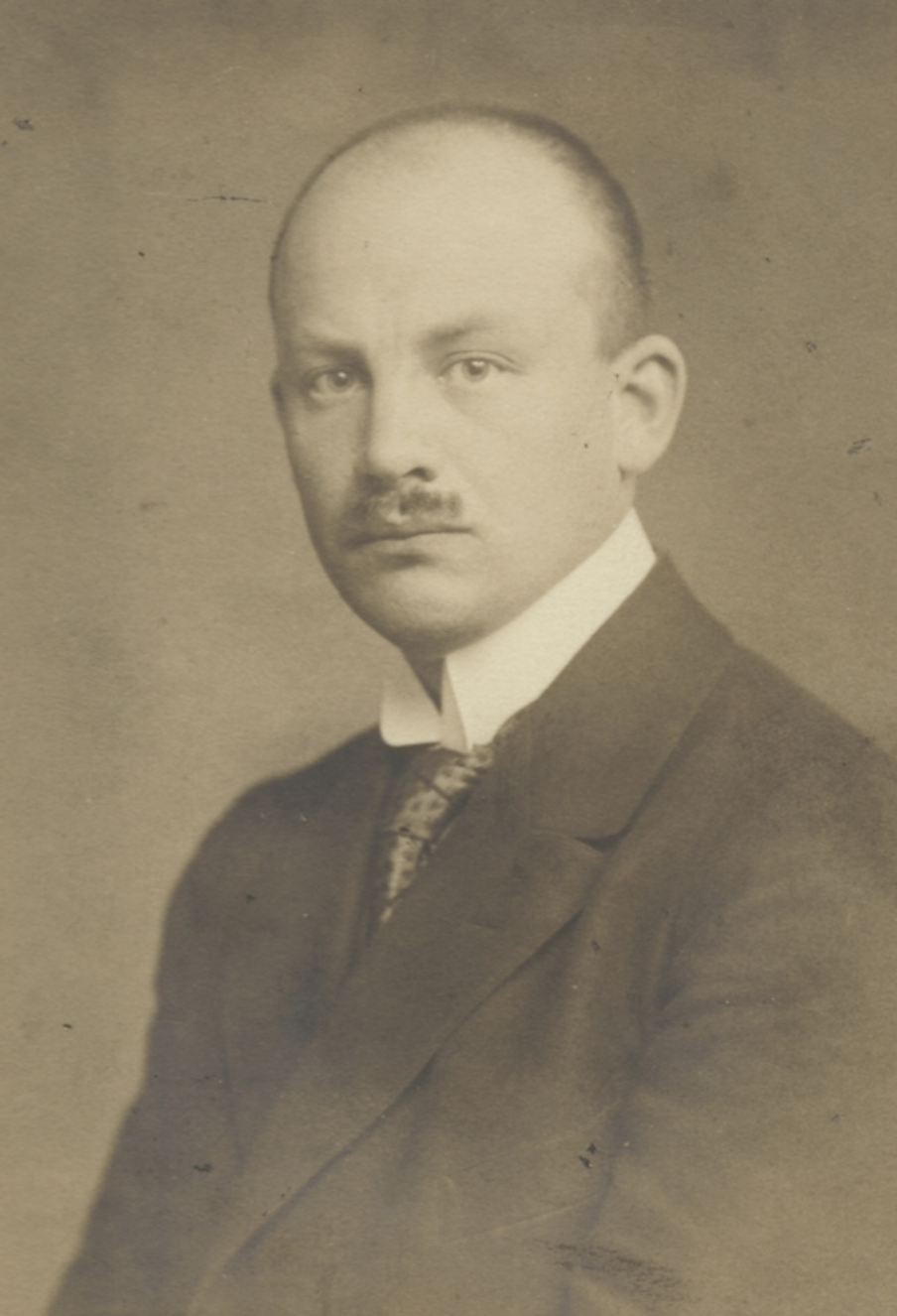

Benno Richard Ottow (May 14, 1884 – May 29, 1975) was a Baltic German surgeon, gynecologist and naturalist. He served as a professor of obstetrics and gynaecology in Berlin and became a controversial figure for his role in sterilization measures as part of the policy of the Third Reich. He was in charge of making assessments on whether women with hereditary medical conditions needed to be sterilized. He also had an interest in ornithology to which he shifted after World War II.

Ottow was born in Kertel on the island of Dagö in the Estonian part of the Russian Empire. He went to the University of Yuryev (Tartu) to study medicine but left in 1905 due to unrest in Russia. He then studied in Rostock (1906-1911) under Dietrich Barfurth (1849-1927) and passed the general practitioner's exam in 1911. He served in the Russian army but left around November 1917. He then studied gynaecology, working in Berlin (1912) at the Charité under Ernst Bumm (1858-1925) and Karl Veit Franz (1870-1926) and later at Dresden under Ferdinand Adolf Kehrer (1837-1914). Kehrer was known for his expertise in caesarean sections. Still later in 1918 he went to Kiel and worked under Walter Stoeckel (1871-1961) and in 1920 he wrote a dissertation at Dorpat on birth complications. In 1925 he followed Stoeckel at the Trier Institute in Leipzig and served as an assistant. In 1926 he followed Stoeckel to Berlin where he became a German citizen. After habilitation in 1928 he became a professor of gynecology and obstetrics at the University of Berlin. In 1932 he joined the NSDAP. In 1933 he was put in charge of the Brandenburg State Women's Clinic in Berlin-Neukölln after the dismissal of Sigfrid Hammerschlag (1871–1948) on the grounds of having a Jewish ancestry.

Ottow married first to Helene Ulmann and secondly to Elisabeth née von Mühlendahl. In 1945 he fled to Schleswig-Holstein as there was a risk that the Allied denazification court would find that he was not merely acting on orders. He then moved to Sweden where he found work at the natural history museum in Stockholm. He worked on ornithology and studies on bird osteology, publishing in ornithological journals. He also took an interest in the history and work of Karl Ernst von Baer in embryology. He retired in 1958 from the National Museum of Natural History in Stockholm. He died in Stockholm.
