= De Goeje Mountains =

Mountain range in Suriname

- Location within Suriname

Highest point
- Elevation: 658 m (2,159 ft)
- Coordinates: 3°24′N 54°13′W

Geography
- Country: Suriname
- Borders on: Fatoe Switie Mountains

The De Goeje Mountains (Dutch: De Goejegebergte) is a mountain range in the Sipaliwini District of Suriname. It is named after Claudius de Goeje.
