= Blue Wing Airlines =

Surinamese airline

IATA	ICAO	Call sign
—	BWI	BLUE TAIL
- Commenced operations: January 2002; 24 years ago
- Operating bases: Zorg en Hoop Airport
- Fleet size: 8
- Headquarters: Paramaribo, Suriname
- Key people: Amichand Jhauw (MD); Soejijar Verkuijl (Director of operations)
- Website: www.bluewingairlines.com

Blue Wing Airlines n.v. is an airline with its head office on the grounds of Zorg en Hoop Airport in Paramaribo, Suriname. The airline started operations in January 2002 and operates charter and scheduled services from Paramaribo to destinations in the interior of Suriname, Guyana, Brazil, Venezuela and the Caribbean area. Its main base is Zorg en Hoop Airport. The airline is on the list of air carriers banned in the EU for safety violations. They were temporarily removed from the list on 28 November 2007 after implementing a corrective action plan ordered by the EU Transportation Commission. However, on 6 July 2010, the airline was banned again from European and French territory airspace as a result of three accidents involving Blue Wing Airlines: one on 3 April 2008 with 19 fatalities, another accident on 15 October 2009 that led to four unspecified injuries, and a third incident on 15 May 2010 with 8 fatalities. As of 2023, Blue Wing Airlines was banned from operating within the European Union.

As of 2024, Blue Wings performs cargo as well as daily scheduled flights to the interior of Suriname and the Caribbean region.

== History ==
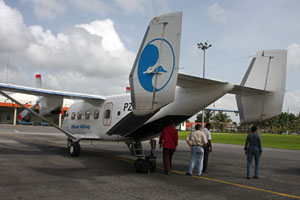
Blue Wing Airlines Antonov An-28 at Cheddi Jagan International Airport, Georgetown, Guyana. (2008)

PZ-TGP & PZ-TGQ (Cessna U206G, Stationairs 6) and PZ-TGW (Antonov 28) became the first aircraft of Blue Wing Airlines (named after the Blue Wing, a local bird). In January 2002, Blue Wing started operations from Zorg en Hoop airfield in Paramaribo with managing director Amichand Jhauw. It started with domestic operations to the many small strips Suriname owing to mining activities. In the meantime also scheduled services to neighbor Guyana and French Guiana were offered. During 2004 and 2005, four Antonov 28s were added to the fleet. Earlier, another former ITA Cessna U206G (PZ-TLV) was put into service. In May 2006, the Antonovs were the only aircraft capable of operating from the inland strips during severe flooding and were extensively used for relief flights.

In 2007, a Cessna 208 Caravan I (PZ-TSB) was added to the fleet, while at the end of 2007, the first DHC-6 Twin Otter (PZ-TSD) was purchased. In November 2008, again a new aircraft type was added to the fleet when a Reims/Cessna F406 Caravan II (PZ-TSF) arrived. This aircraft is operated as an “executive transport”. Furthermore, a few weeks later, a second DHC-6 Twin Otter (PZ-TSH) was purchased in Australia. In 2010, a Cessna 208B Grand Caravan (PZ-TSK) was added to the fleet, and in March 2015 another Cessna 208B Grand Caravan (PZ-TSL) was the latest addition to the Blue Wing Airlines fleet.

After a series of safety violations, plane crashes, and insufficient responses to investigators, Blue Wing was put on the European Union blacklist of unsafe airlines in 2010. The French aviation authority banned all activities of Blue Wing Airlines over French territory on 1 June 2010 after finding “verified evidence of serious non-compliance" with Convention on International Civil Aviation standards and that neither Surinamese authorities nor Blue Wing Airlines had been able to identify specific issues leading up to each incident. The airline stated that the accidents were caused by inadequate infrastructure at the often uncertified inland airstrips they operated from and the absence of Ground Proximity Warning Systems (GPWS) on board the Blue Wing aircraft. While Blue Wing has never operated in Europe, the airline did operate in French Guiana, which is why they were subject to French and EU transport authorities.

== Fleet ==
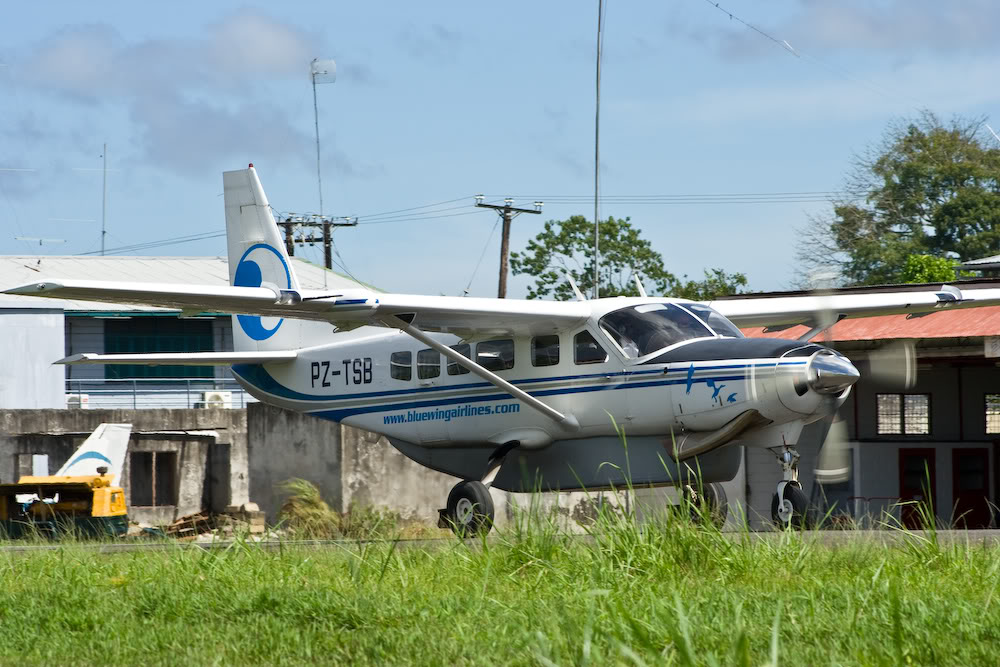
Blue Wing Airlines Cessna 208 Caravan at SMZO

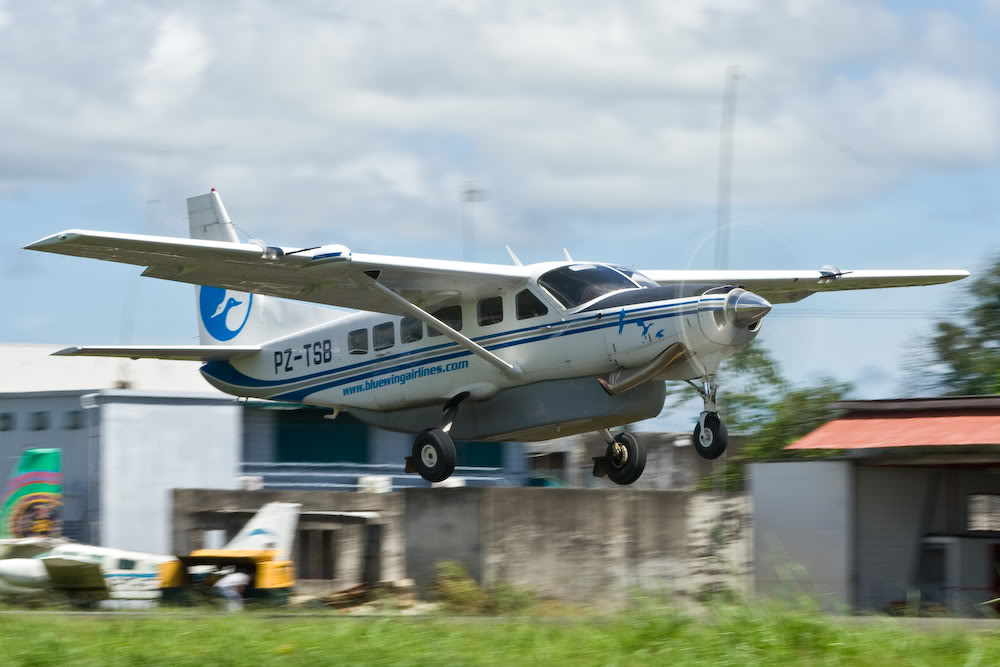
Blue Wing Airlines Cessna 208 Caravan take-off from SMZO

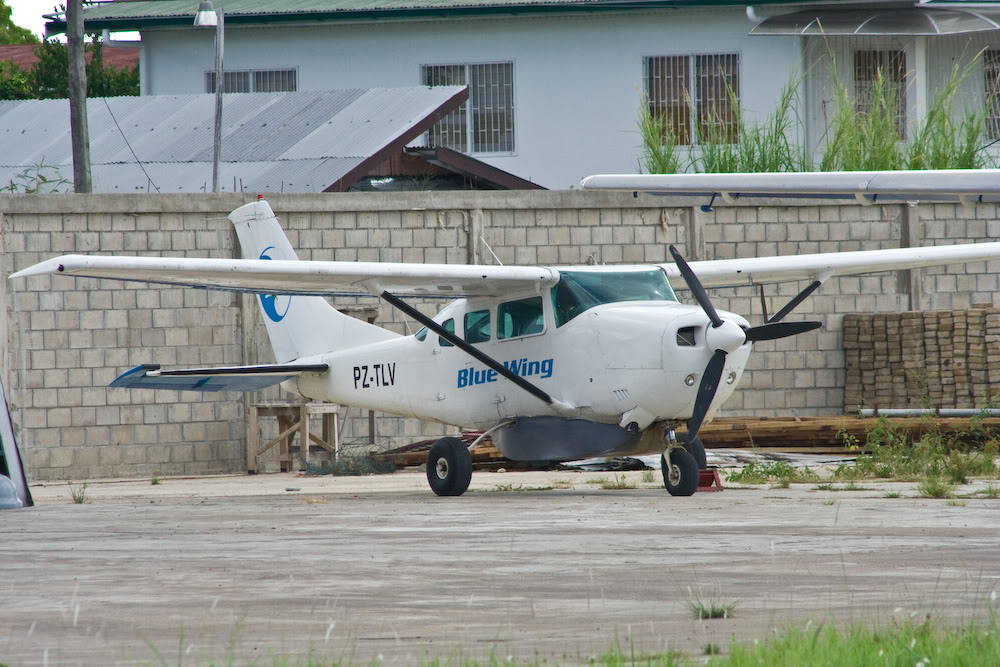
Blue Wing Airlines Cessna U206G Stationair-6 at SMZO

The Blue Wing Airlines fleet consists of the following aircraft (as of 16 August 2014):

Blue Wing Airlines fleet
Aircraft	In service	Passengers
Cessna 206	2	5
Cessna 208 Caravan	3	14
De Havilland Canada DHC-6-200 Twin Otter	1 (as of August 2025)	19
Reims-Cessna F406 Caravan II	1	10-12
Total	8	

== Accidents and incidents ==
- On 3 April 2008, an Antonov An-28 (PZ-TSO) of the airline crashed during a go-around at the Lawa Antino Airstrip in Benzdorp, Suriname. The aircraft crashed into the jungle about 150 meters from the airstrip and burst into flames. All 19 occupants (17 passengers and two crew) were killed. Among the victims was pilot Soeriani Verkuijl, wife of Blue Wing's Managing Director Amichand Jhauw. Only in late October 2008 was the flight data recorder found during a reconstruction of the wreck.
- On 15 October 2009, a second Antonov An-28 (PZ-TST) of Blue Wing Airlines was damaged beyond repair while landing at the Kwamelasemoetoe airstrip close to the Trio Indian village in the south of Suriname on a domestic flight from Zorg en Hoop Airport. Of the 8 persons on board, one crewmember and 3 passengers were injured.
- A third Blue Wing Antonov An-28 (PZ-TSV) crashed on 15 May 2010 over the upper-Marowijne District, approximately 5 kilometres (3 mi) north-east of Poeketi, Suriname. The two pilots and six passengers died. The plane had taken off from Godo Holo Airstrip. Following this incident, Blue Wing's two remaining Antonovs (PZ-TSA, which is the re-registered PZ-TGW & PZ-TSN) of were grounded indefinitely.

== See also ==
- List of airlines of Suriname
- List of airlines banned in the European Union
