= Fatoe Switie Mountains =

Mountain range in Suriname

- Location within Suriname

Highest point
- Elevation: 375 m (1,230 ft)
- Coordinates: 3°38′N 54°10′W

Geography
- Country: Suriname
- Borders on: De Goeje Mountains

Fatoe Switie Mountains (Dutch: Fatoe Switiegebergte) is a mountain range in the Sipaliwini District of Suriname. The highest peak is about 375 metres.

In 1902, Governor Cornelis Lely of Suriname decided that the Lawa Railway would be built by the government. The railway line would transport gold from the foot of the Fatoe Switie Mountains to Paramaribo. The proposed 350-kilometre (220 mi) railway line was only half completed from Paramaribo due to disappointing gold finds. As of 1998, Golden Star Resources has a base at Fatoe Switie for their gold mining operations which is located about 17-kilometre (11 mi) from Benzdorp.
