= Kärdla crater =

Impact crater in Estonia

Coordinates: 59°1′N 22°46′E

- Kärdla astrobleme

Impact crater structure
- Confidence: Confirmed
- Diameter: 4 kilometres (2.5 mi)
- Age: 455 Ma
- Exposed: No
- Drilled: Yes

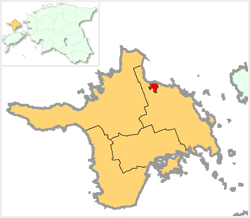
Location of Kardla

Kärdla (also Kärdla astrobleme) is a meteorite crater near the town of Kärdla in Estonia.

It is 4 kilometres (2.5 mi) in diameter and its age is estimated to be about 455 million years (Late Ordovician). The crater is not exposed at the surface.

Its formation has been associated with the breakdown of 100km asteroid, that might have also resulted in the Tvären and Lockne craters in Sweden among others.
