= Claudius de Goeje =

Dutch Navy officer and cartographer

Claudius Henricus de Goeje
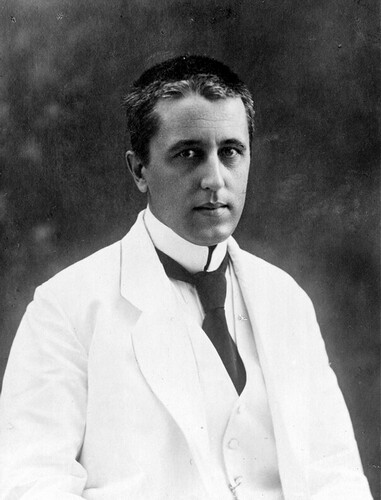
- Born: May 4, 1879; Leiden, Netherlands
- Died: June 8, 1955 (aged 76); The Hague, Netherlands
- Occupation(s): Navy officer Cartographer; Cultural anthropologist
- Parent(s): Michael Jan de Goeje and Wilhelmina Henriëtte Leembruggen

Claudius Henricus de Goeje (4 May 1879 – 8 June 1955) was a Dutch Navy officer and cartographer, who took a special interest in the Wayana and Tiriyó peoples he encountered on his expeditions to the interior of Suriname. For his lifelong interest in the Amerindian peoples of the Surinamese interior, he was awarded an endowed professorship in the Linguistics and Anthropology of Suriname and Curaçao at Leiden University in 1946. De Goeje retired in 1951 and died four years later, in 1955.

The De Goeje Mountains in Suriname are named after Claudius de Goeje.

== Biography ==
Claudius de Goeje was born in Leiden to Dutch orientalist Michael Jan de Goeje and Wilhelmina Henriëtte Leembruggen. Claudius de Goeje did not excel in school and chose to pursue a career in the Royal Netherlands Navy, where he could fulfil his dream of travelling the world. Until 1909, he worked as a lieutenant at the Dienst der Hydrografie in the Dutch East Indies. Between 1910 and 1924, De Goeje worked at the Maritime Transport Service in Batavia. Because of his talents in cartography, De Goeje was allowed leave several times to be part of expeditions to the Surinamese interior under the auspices of the Royal Netherlands Geographical Society.

De Goeje was a cartographer during the Gonini expedition of 1903–1904 and the Tapanahony expedition of 1904, which were led by Alphons Franssen Herderschee. De Goeje subsequently led the Tumuk Humak expedition of 1907. Thirty years later, after his retirement from the navy, De Goeje once more visited Suriname as part of the expedition of 1936 and 1937 to establish the Surinamese border with Brazil led by Conrad Carel Käyser.
