= 2008 Blue Wing Airlines An-28 crash =

2008 aviation accident in Suriname

Coordinates: 03°41′N 054°05′W

Benzdorp An-28 crash
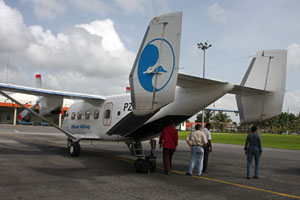
- A Blue Wing Airlines Antonov An-28 similar to the accident aircraft

Accident
- Date: 3 April 2008
- Summary: Controlled flight into terrain
- Site: Lawa Antino Airstrip, Benzdorp, Suriname

Aircraft
- Aircraft type: Antonov An-28
- Operator: Blue Wing Airlines
- Registration: PZ-TSO
- Flight origin: Zorg en Hoop Airport, Paramaribo, Suriname
- Stopover: Lawa Antino Airport, Benzdorp, Suriname
- Destination: Lawa Antino Airport, Benzdorp, Suriname
- Occupants: 19
- Passengers: 17
- Crew: 2
- Fatalities: 19
- Survivors: 0

On 3 April 2008, a Blue Wing Airlines Antonov An-28 registered as PZ-TSO) crashed upon landing at Lawa Antino Airport in Benzdorp, Suriname. The plane carried 17 passengers and a crew of 2, all of whom perished. The crash occurred at around 11:00 am ART (14:00 UTC). Initial media reports indicated that the airplane had to abort the landing, as the runway was being used by another Blue Wing Airlines Anotnov An-28. The airplane attempted a go-around, but failed to gain height and crashed into a mountain.

== Casualties ==
The pilot, Soeriani Jhauw-Verkuijl, was the wife of Blue Wing Airlines president Amichand Jhauw. Her brother and colleague was an eyewitness to the crash. Also among the casualties was co-pilot Robert Lackin, as well as a family of six from Antécume-Pata, citizens of French Guiana. They were to have flown on to Anapaike.

A Dutch national police forensic team was dispatched to assist in the identification of victims. While nine of the victims were identified in Suriname, the last ten were identified, using DNA analysis, by a Dutch forensic institute.

== Flight ==
The plane had taken off from Zorg en Hoop Airport in Paramaribo with seventeen passengers and two crew at 10:00 local time. Eleven were due to disembark at Lawa Antino airstrip, 10 km west of the southeastern gold mining town of Benzdorp, near the Lawa River bordering French Guiana. They were preparing to work for telecommunications company Telesur.
