= Ene (name) =

Given name and surname

Ene is both a given name and a surname.

== Given name ==
- Ene Ergma (born 1944), Estonian politician
- Ene Järvis (1947–2025), Estonian actress
- Ene Kaups (born 1963), Estonian politician
- Ene Mihkelson (1944–2017), Estonian writer
- Ene Franca Idoko (born 1985), Nigerian sprinter
- Ene Rämmeld (born 1947), Estonian actress
- Haide-Ene Rebassoo (1935–2018), Estonian botanist
- Ene Riisna (born 1938), Estonian-American television producer
- Ene-Liis Semper (born 1969), Estonian video artist, performance artist, scenographer and theatre director
- Ene-Margit Tiit (born 1934), Estonian mathematician and statistician

== Surname ==
- Alexandru Ene (1928–2011), Romanian footballer
- Ana Derșidan-Ene-Pascu (1944–2022), Romanian fencer
- Gheorghe Ene (1937–2009), Romanian footballer
- Gigel Ene (born 1982), Romanian footballer
- Noni Răzvan Ene (born 1992), Romanian singer
- Orhun Ene (born 1967), Turkish former professional basketball player
