= Marianna Liik =

Estonian composer (born 1992)

Marianna Liik (born 8 September 1992) is an Estonian composer. Since 2014, she has been a member of the Estonian Composers' Union.

== Education ==
Marianna Liik was born in Kärdla, on the island of Hiiumaa. she graduated in 2017 from the Estonian Academy of Music and Theatre with a master’s degree in composition, studying under Helena Tulve and Margo Kõlar. In 2014, she received a bachelor’s degree in electroacoustic composition from the same institution, studying under Margo Kõlar and Malle Maltis. From 2017 to 2018, she studied at the Royal Conservatoire Antwerp (Koninklijk Conservatorium Antwerpen) under Wim Henderickx.

== Works ==
Marianna Liik has composed music for orchestra, ensembles, choir, as well as electroacoustic works and theatre music. Her special interest is the sound world that is created by combining the acoustic and electronic means of expression. Liik’s compositions have been performed at various festivals in Estonia and internationally, including in the United States, Poland, Germany, Russia, Australia, Switzerland, and China.

In 2019, she was selected for the Roche Young Commissions programme associated with the Lucerne Festival Academy. Her commissioned work Kurzschluss premiered on 1 September 2019, at the Lucerne Festival by the Lucerne Festival Academy Orchestra under conductor Ruth Reinhardt.

Liik's choral works have been performed by the Estonian Philharmonic Chamber Choir and Collegium Musicale in collaboration with the Rascher Saxophone Quartet. Her works have been performed at festivals including the Estonian Music Days, AFEKT Festival, Baltic Music Days, and Ung Nordisk Musik.

In 2022, her debut album Januneb valgust was released.

== Reception ==
Liik's music has been noted in critical writing for its focus on timbre, texture, and the integration of acoustic and electronic sound materials.

=== Motion in Oscillating Fields (2016) ===
Following its premiere with the Estonian National Symphony Orchestra, the work was described as an orchestral composition exploring oscillatory structures and electronic sound layers. Critics highlighted its sonic energy and structural tension.

=== Januneb valgust (2022) ===
The album has been described as combining chamber music and electroacoustic textures, characterised by a contemplative atmosphere and detailed timbral organisation.

=== Värelused (2022) ===
The work has been noted for its structured development and use of extended instrumental techniques.

=== Uduna hääbuv (2025) ===
The work by Marianna Liik was presented in an exhibition created by visual artist Ave Palm and has been described as a spatial work combining field recordings, electronics, and cello.

=== Lahtirullumine (2025) ===
The premiere at the Estonian Music Days festival was noted for its formal development and evolving orchestral textures.

== Awards ==
- 2013 – 2nd prize in the under-30 category at the International Rostrum of Composers in Prague for the work Mets
- 2014 – Westdeutscher Rundfunk Film Music Prize at the European film music and sound festival “SoundTrack_Cologne 11”
- 2017 – “Roche Young Commissions” young composer award at the Lucerne Festival Academy
- 2018 – the work Adapt to prevailing stream and become able to see clearly selected for the International Society for Contemporary Music (ISCM) festival World New Music Days
- 2023 – Annual Prize of the Cultural Endowment of Estonia (Music Endowment)
- 2024 – the work Out of Breath was selected for the ISCM festival World New Music Days
- 2025 – LHV Innovation Prize (Maaalune / “Underground”)
- 2026 – LHV New Composition Award (Lahtirullumine / “Unfolding” for piano and chamber orchestra)
