= List of airlines of Estonia =

This is a list of airlines currently operating in Estonia.

== Charter airlines ==
Airline	Image	IATA	ICAO	Callsign	Commenced operations
Airest			AEG	AIREST CARGO	2002
Diamond Sky			DMS	DIAMOND	2013
Fort Aero			FRX	FORT AERO	2013
Marabu		DI	MBU	MARABU	2023
NyxAir		OJ	NYX	NYX AIR	2017
Panaviatic			VPC	SOLAR	2009
Skystream Airlines AS		OL	3LD		2021

== See also ==
- List of airlines
- List of defunct airlines of Estonia
- List of defunct airlines of Europe
