= Benzdorp =

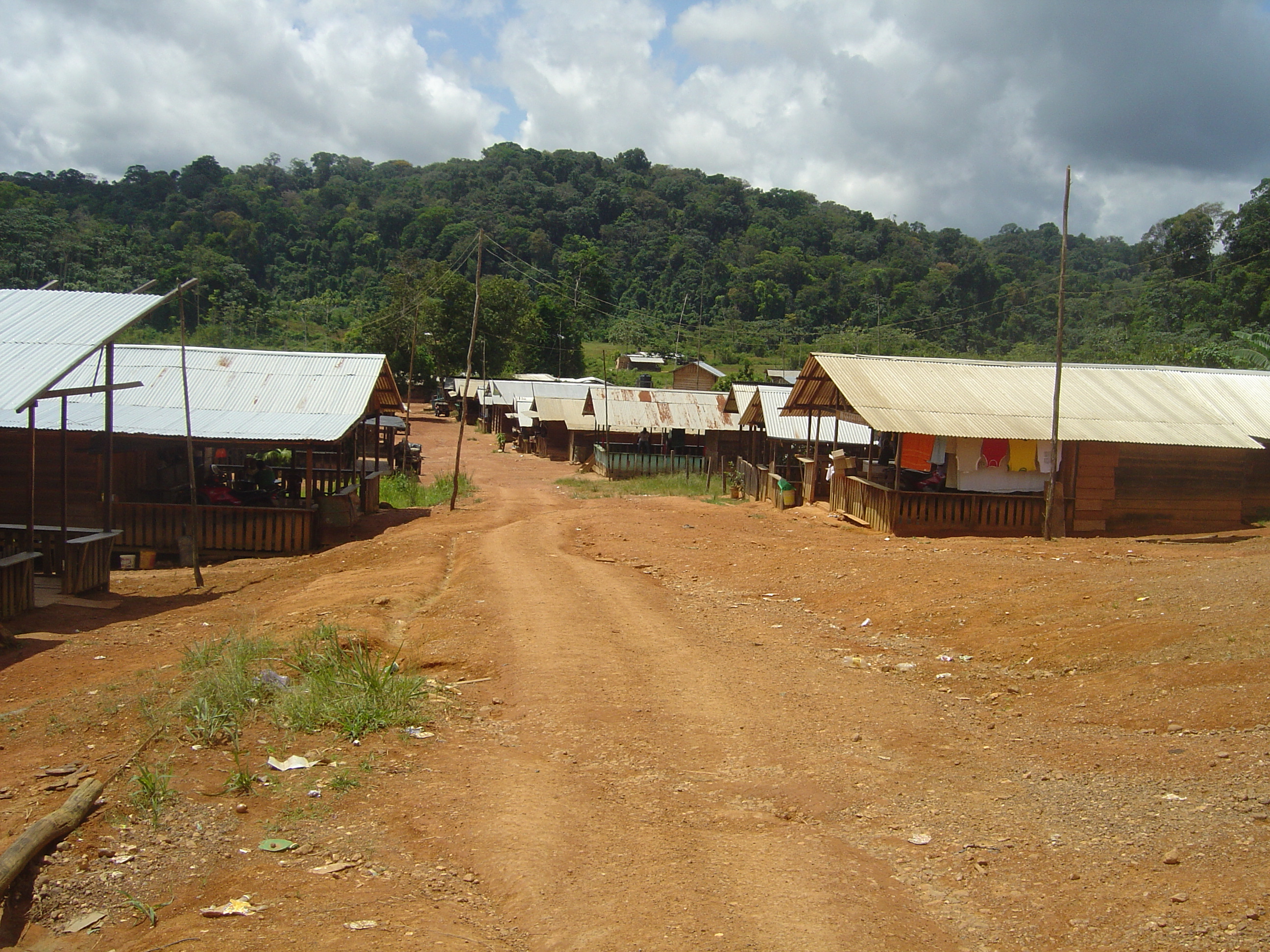

- Location in Suriname
- Coordinates: 3°40′26″N 54°5′6″W
- Country: Suriname
- District: Sipaliwini District
- Resort (municipality): Tapanahony

Benzdorp is a village in the Sipaliwini District of Suriname. It is named after the Dutch consul and bullion dealer Henry Albert Wilhelm Benz (1889–1962).

== Geography ==
The village lies in the jungle of the Tapanahony resort, near the Lawa River that forms the border with French Guiana, an overseas region and further north, in the Marowijne. Near Benzdorp is the rapids of Oemankrassiabra. Downstream (to the North) lies the town of Cottica and upstream is Anapaike. To the east is Nouveau Wakapou. To the Southeast, across the Lawa River is the French Guyanese commune of Maripasoula.

== Notable landmark ==
Southwest of the village is Fatu Switie, a mountain ridge with an altitude of about 375 meters.

== History ==
Around 1885, gold was found in this area between the Lawa and the Tapanahony rivers, but because there was a disputed border between the Dutch and the French colony, the case was submitted to Russian Tsar Alexander III who in May 1891 awarded the area to Suriname. In 1902, then-Governor Cornelis Lely in Suriname, decided that the Lawa Railway would be built by the government. The railway line would transport gold from the Lawa area to Paramaribo. The proposed 350-kilometre (220 mi) railway line was only half completed from Paramaribo due to disappointing gold finds.

Around 1974, the population of the village shrank to about 10 inhabitants. More recently, gold seekers have returned to the village, including a relatively large number of garimpeiros (Brazilian gold miners), and it became a gold extraction area since the early 1990s. The garimpeiros and gowtuman (Surinamese gold miners) moved inland, founding a new village referred to as Benzdorp, though it is kilometers away from the original village Benz founded on the banks of the Lawa River (which is now called "the landing"). An estimated 600 people live in the contemporary Benz village, of which two thirds come from Brazil and the others are maroons.

Benzdorp is originally an Aluku (or Aloekoe or Boni) village; both banks (but especially the French) of the Lawa on this height have been inhabited by the Aluku Maroons for hundreds of years. These people have been active as gold miners in this part of their habitat. The Surinamese government has the rights to gold mining in the Benz village and surroundings and has issued a concession to Grassalco, which provides contracts to the (Brazilian, Surinamese and French) gold miners for a monthly fee.

== Notable disasters ==
In May 2006, the village was flooded when the water of the Lawa reached far beyond the banks as a result of heavy rainfall, where also many other Surinamese villages suffered from then.

On April 3, 2008, an airplane operated by Blue Wing Airlines crashed upon landing at Lawa Antino Airport near Benzdorp in which 19 people were killed. The Lawa Antino airport is 9 kilometres (5.6 mi) west of Benzdorp.

On May 17, 2013, a private helicopter from French Guiana, tasked with transporting gold during an unregistered flight in the interior of Suriname, crashed near Benzdorp gold mining settlement of Boewese, in the concession of NaNa Resources. The pilot got injured with a leg fracture and was transferred for treatment to Maripasoula in French Guiana.
