= Enimex =

Airline in Estonia

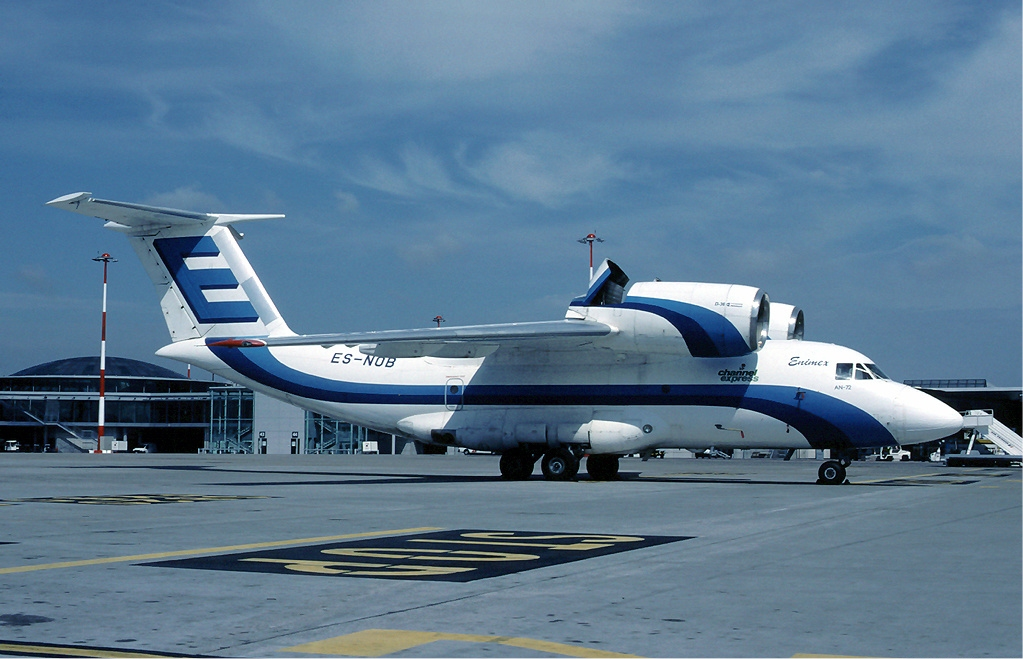
- Antonov An-72
IATA	ICAO	Call sign
-	ENI	ENIMEX
- Founded: August 1994
- Ceased operations: 14 June 2008
- Parent company: Enimex Limited
- Headquarters: Tallinn, Estonia
- Website: www.enimex.ee

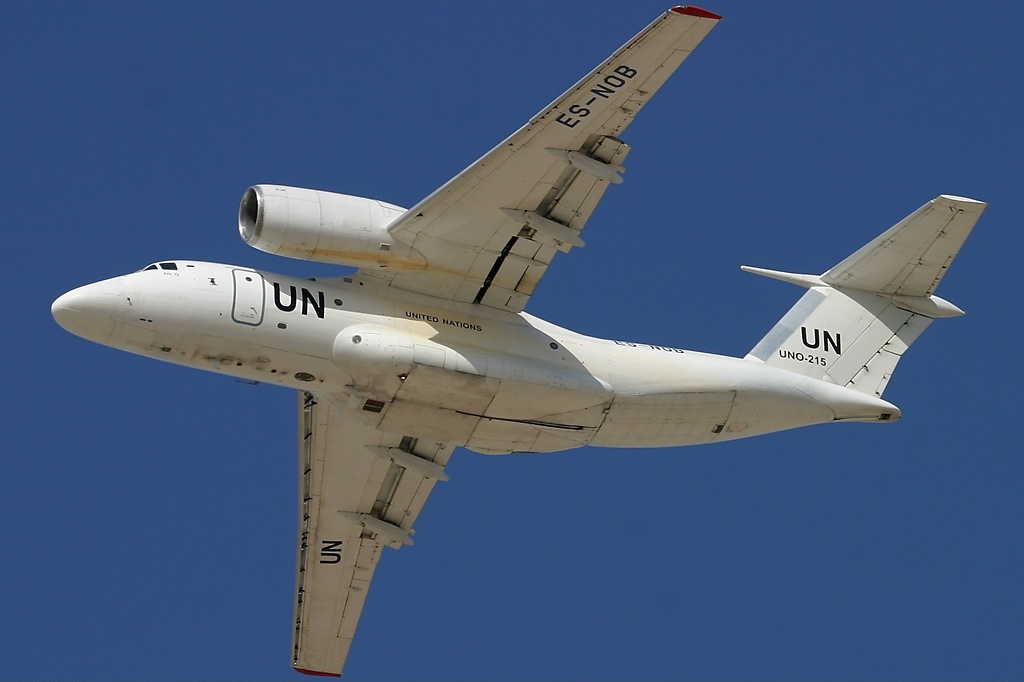
Antonov An-72 in United Nations all-white livery

Enimex was an airline based in Tallinn, Estonia. It operated cargo and passenger charter flights, and wet lease operations worldwide. The main operational base was Lennart Meri Tallinn Airport.

== History ==
The airline was established in August 1994 and started operations on the following 26 September. In March 2006, after a serious accident and some other irregularities Estonia's Civil Aviation Administration cancelled the Enimex licence to carry out passenger flights. In the early 2000s, two freight aircraft were lost in accidents. All flight operations were stopped on 14 June 2008. At the time of closure the fleet consisted of 1 Antonov An-72 and 1 leased BAe ATP.

== Fleet ==
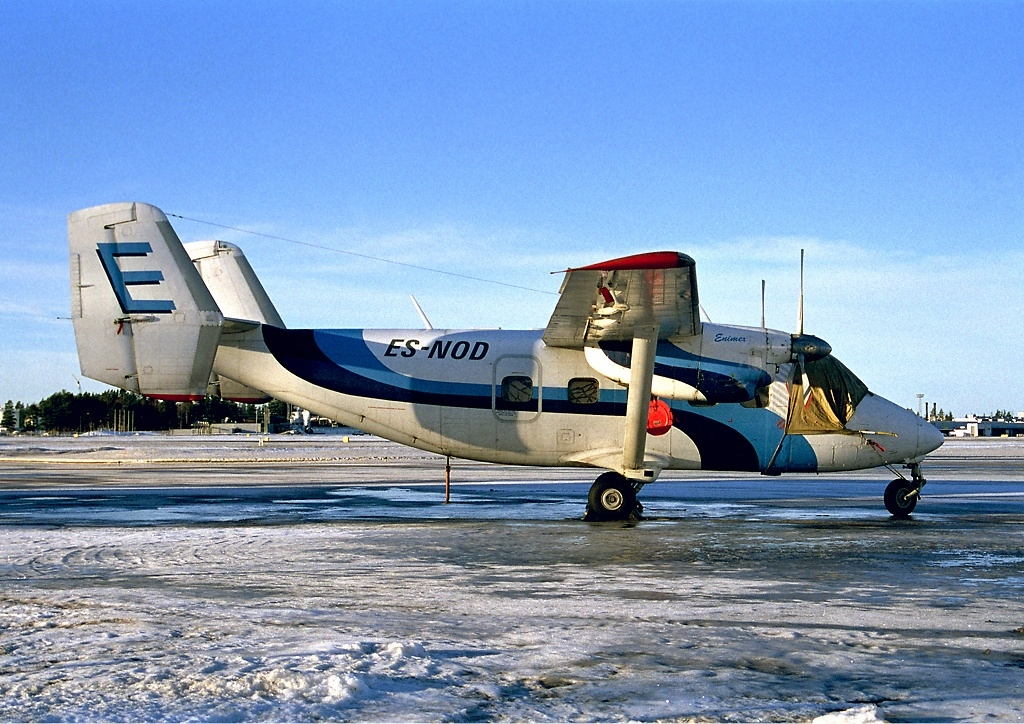
Antonov An-28

During its existence, Enimex operated the following aircraft:

- Antonov An-28
- Antonov An-72
- BAe ATP

== Accidents and incidents ==
- 29 November 1999 − Antonov An-28 ES-NOF on cargo flight from Oslo to Budapest with a stop at Szczecin crashlanded on a field in Poland. No fatalities, but the airframe was written off.
- 23 November 2001 − ELK Airways Flight 1007 operated by Enimex the Antonov AN-28 ES-NOV on the attempt to land on Kärdla Airport in bad weather crashed into trees about 1.5 km from the Airport. Of the 14 passengers and 3 crew on board, 2 passengers were killed. The investigation determined that the cause of the accident was pilot error. After a 9-year trial, a case was closed due to lack of public interest.
- 21 April 2002 – Antonov An-72 ES-NOP of Enimex was damaged in a hard landing at Wamena, Indonesia; a minor fire broke out. Due to the dead battery of the fire truck, some firefighters ran to the accident scene with hand-held fire extinguishers. After 20 minutes, the truck's battery was charged, but the aircraft had to be written off. There were no fatalities.
- 10 February 2003 − Antonov AN-28 ES-NOY on a regular cargo flight from Tallinn to Helsinki, crashed shortly after takeoff from Tallinn's Lennart Meri Airport. The aircraft came to rest about 300 meters from the runway. Two of the three crew members on board were killed.
