= Antonov An-28 =

Utility transport aircraft by Antonov

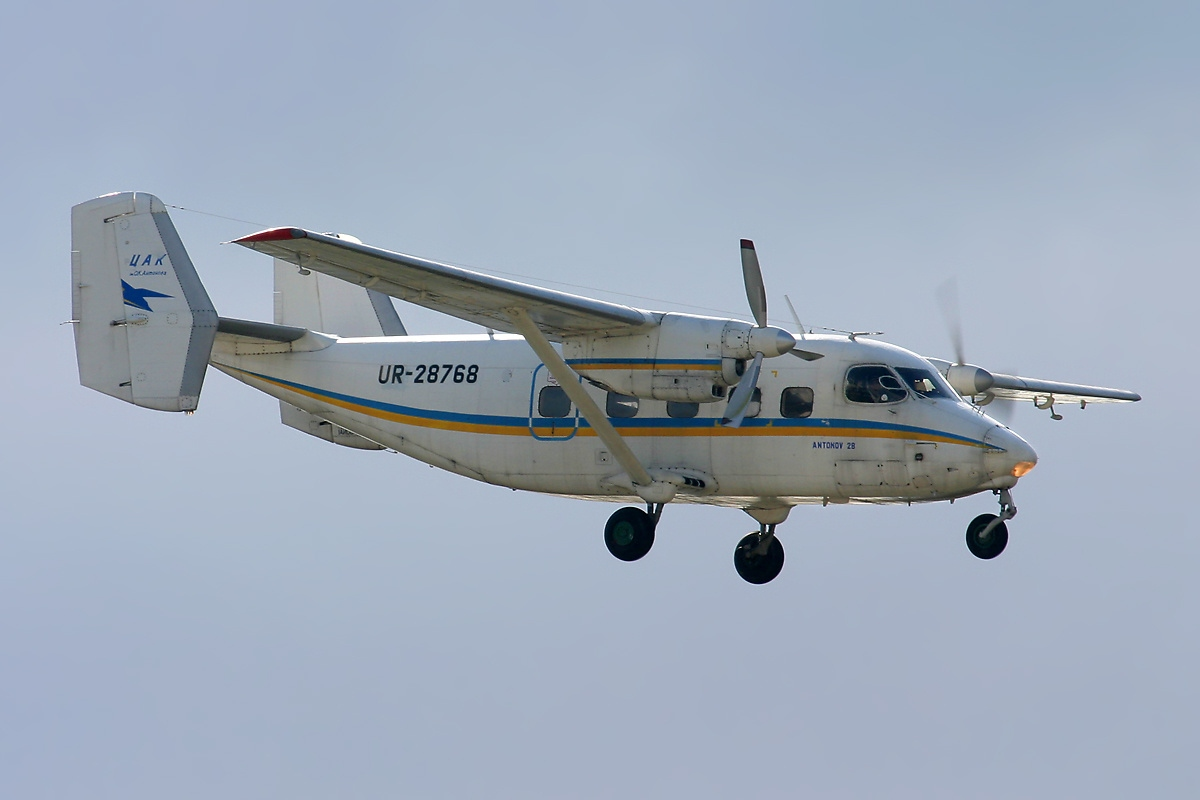
- Antonov An-28 in 2008

General information
- Type: Short-range airliner, utility aircraft
- Designer: Antonov
- Built by: WSK PZL Mielec
- Status: In service
- Primary user: Aeroflot (former)
- Number built: 191

History
- Manufactured: 1975–1993
- Introduction date: 1986
- First flight: September 1969
- Developed from: Antonov An-14
- Variant: PZL M28 Skytruck
- Developed into: Antonov An-38

The Antonov An-28 (NATO reporting name Cash) is a twin-engined light turboprop transport aircraft, developed from the Antonov An-14M. It was the winner of a competition against the Beriev Be-30, for use by Aeroflot as a short-range airliner. It first flew in 1969. A total of 191 were built and 16 remain in airline service as at August 2015. After a short pre-production series built by Antonov, it was licence-built in Poland by PZL-Mielec. In 1993, PZL-Mielec developed its own improved variant, the PZL M28 Skytruck.

== Development ==
The An-28 is similar to the An-14 in many aspects, including its wing structure and twin rudders, but features an expanded fuselage and turboprop engines, in place of the An-14's piston engines. The An-28 first flew as a modified An-14 in 1969. The next preproduction model did not fly until 1975. In passenger carrying configuration, accommodation was provided for up to 15 people, in addition to the two-man crew. Production was transferred to PZL-Mielec in 1978. The first Polish-built aircraft did not fly until 1984. The An-28 finally received its Soviet type certificate in 1986.

== Variants ==
An-14A
The original Antonov designation for an enlarged, twin-turboprop version of the An-14.
An-14M
Prototype.
An-28
Twin-engined short-range utility transport aircraft, three built.
An-28RM Bryza 1RM
Search and rescue, air ambulance aircraft.
An-28TD Bryza 1TD
Transport version.
An-28PT
Variant made in Poland with Pratt & Whitney PT6 engines first flown 22 July 1993.

== Operators ==
=== Civilian operators ===
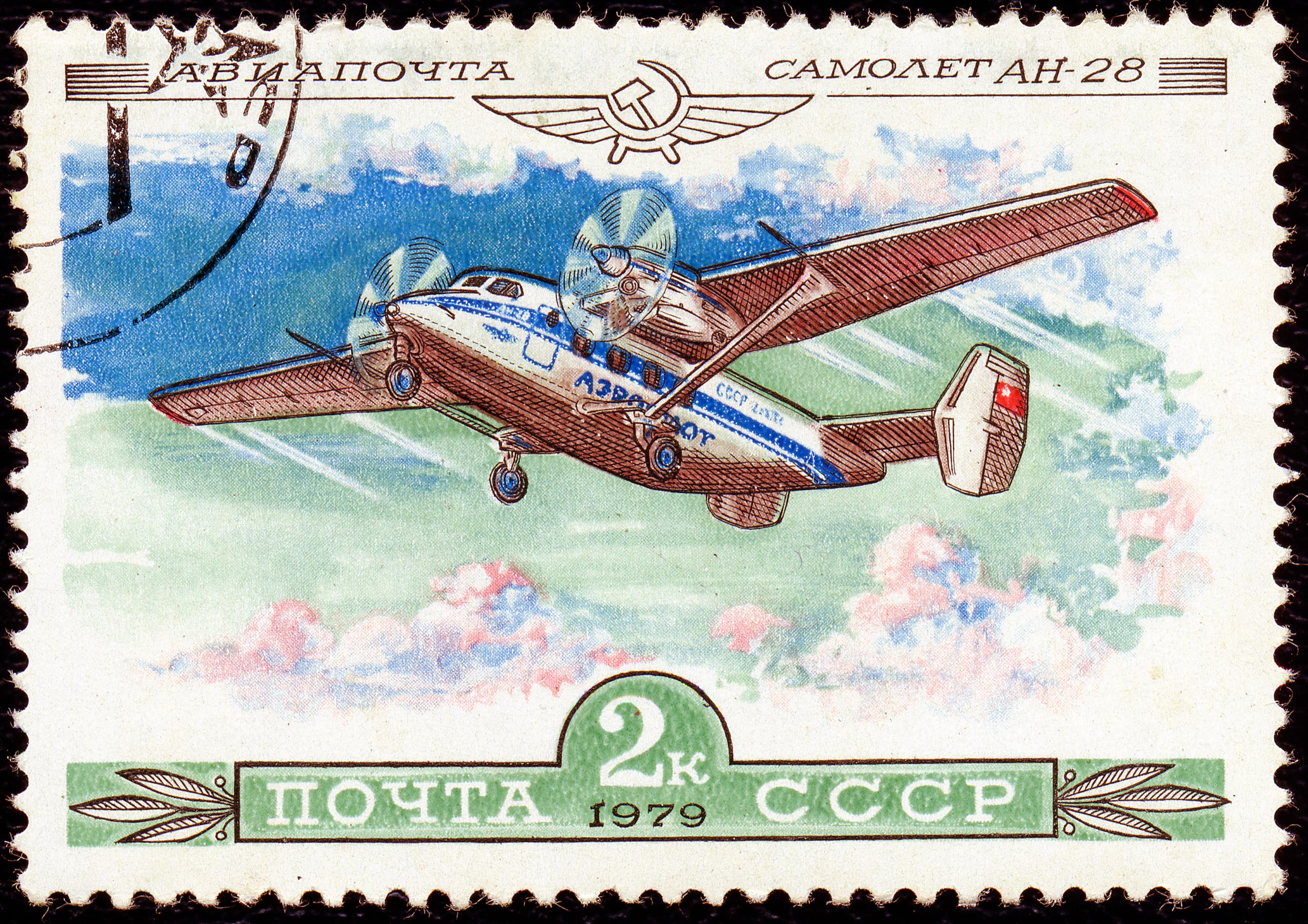
An-28 on USSR postal stamp

Major operators of the 16 Antonov An-28 aircraft remaining in airline service include:

Armenia

- Skiva Air (2)

Russia

- Vostok Airlines (3)
- SiLA (3)

Tajikistan

- Tajik Air (2)

==== Former civilian operators ====
Estonia

- Air Livonia
- Enimex

Kazakhstan

- Avluga-Trans (11)

Kyrgyzstan

- Kyrgyzstan Airlines (5)

Moldova

- Tepavia Trans (4)

Suriname

- Blue Wing Airlines (formerly operated five with three lost in crashes on 3 April 2008, 15 October 2009, and 15 May 2010)

=== Military operators ===
Georgia

- Georgian Air Force – two as of December 2016.

Tanzania

- Tanzania Air Force Command – one as of December 2016.

Ukraine

=== Former military operators ===
Djibouti

- Djibouti Air Force two retired.

Peru

- Peruvian Army two in storage

=== Former operators ===
Soviet Union

- Aeroflot
- Soviet Air Force

== Notable accidents and incidents ==
19 October 1992
Aeroflot Flight 302 stalled and crashed shortly after takeoff from Ust-Nem, Russia following a loss of control due to engine failure, killing 15 of 16 on board.
29 December 1999
Ecuato Guineana (3C-JJI) An-28 crashed into the Black Sea off İnebolu, killing all six people on board.
23 November 2001
ELK Airways Flight 1007, an An-28 ES-NOV operated by Enimex, struck trees and crashed about 1.5 km from the airport while attempting to land in bad weather at Kärdla Airport, Estonia. Of the 14 passengers and 3 crew on board, 2 passengers were killed.
29 August 2002
Vostok Aviation Company Flight 359 struck a mountain slope near Ayan, Russia after the pilot descended too soon during the approach to Ayan, killing all 16 on board.
3 August 2006
A TRACEP-Congo Aviation An-28 (9Q-COM) struck a mountainside in low cloud while descending for Bukavu, Democratic Republic of the Congo, killing all 17 on board.
3 April 2008
A Blue Wing Airlines An-28 crashed upon landing near Benzdorp in Suriname. All 19 on board were killed.
15 October 2009
A Blue Wing Airlines An-28 overran the runway on landing at Kwamelasemoetoe Airstrip, Suriname and hit an obstacle. The aircraft was substantially damaged and four people were injured, one seriously.
15 May 2010
A Blue Wing Airlines An-28 crashed over the upper Marowijne district approximately 5 kilometres (3 mi) north-east of Poketi, Suriname. The two pilots and six passengers died.
30 January 2012
A TRACEP-Congo Aviation An-28 crashed while on a domestic cargo flight from Bukavu-Kamenbe Airport to Namoya Airstrip, Democratic Republic of the Congo, killing three of the five crew.
12 September 2012
Petropavlovsk-Kamchatsky Air Flight 251 crashed while on a domestic flight from Petropavlovsk-Kamchatsky to Palana Airport, killing ten of 14 people.
16 July 2021
SiLA Airlines Flight 42 force-landed and crashed upside-down in the Bakcharsky District, Tomsk Oblast, Russia after both engines failed due to icing; all 18 on board survived.
27 February 2022
An An-28 was damaged by Russian artillery during the attack on Hostomel.

=== 27 August 2026 ===
An An-28 possibly belonging to the Rwandan-backed rebel paramilitary group M-23 was shot down in the Democratic Republic of the Congo inside of M-23 controlled territory by the FARDC. An unknown amount of persons on board died.

== Specifications (An-28) ==
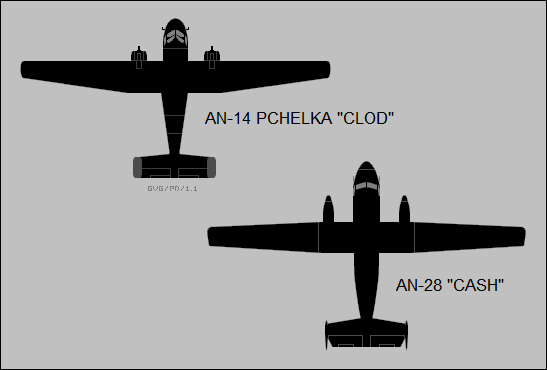
Comparison of the An-14 and the An-28

Data from Jane's All the World's Aircraft 1993–94

General characteristics

- Crew: 2
- Capacity:
  - 17 passengers or
  - 1,750 kg (3,860 lb)
- Length: 13.10 m (43 ft 0 in)
- Wingspan: 22.06 m (72 ft 5 in)
- Height: 4.90 m (16 ft 1 in)
- Wing area: 39.72 m^{2} (427.5 sq ft)
- Aspect ratio: 12.3
- Airfoil: TsAGI R-II-14 (14% thickness)
- Empty weight: 3,900 kg (8,598 lb)
- Max takeoff weight: 6,500 kg (14,330 lb)
- Fuel capacity: 1,960 L (430 imp gal; 520 US gal)
- Powerplant: 2 × Glushenkov TVD-10B turboprop engines, 720 kW (960 shp) each
- Propellers: 3-bladed AW-24AN, 2.80 m (9 ft 2 in) diameter

Performance

- Maximum speed: 350 km/h (220 mph, 190 kn) at 3,000 m (9,800 ft)
- Cruise speed: 335 km/h (208 mph, 181 kn) at 3,000 m (9,800 ft)
- Never exceed speed: 390 km/h (240 mph, 210 kn)
- Range: 1,365 km (848 mi, 737 nmi) (max fuel, 1,000 kg (2,200 lb) payload)
- Service ceiling: 6,000 m (20,000 ft)
- g limits: +3
- Rate of climb: 8.3 m/s (1,640 ft/min)
- Take-off run to 10.7 m (35 ft): 410 m (1,350 ft)
- Landing run from 15 m (50 ft): 315 m (1,033 ft)

== See also ==
Related development

- Antonov An-14
- Antonov An-38
- PZL M28 Skytruck

Aircraft of comparable role, configuration, and era

- CASA C-212 Aviocar
- De Havilland Canada DHC-6 Twin Otter
- Dornier 228
- GAF Nomad
- Harbin Y-12
- IAI Arava
- Let L-410 Turbolet
- Short SC.7 Skyvan

Related lists

- List of civil aircraft
