= Ene Kaups =

Estonian politician

Ene Kaups (born 13 February 1963) is an Estonian politician. She was a member of XI Riigikogu, representing the Estonian Reform Party, and the Mayor of Kärdla from 2005 until 2007.

Ene Kaups was born in Kärdla and graduated from Kärdla Secondary School in 1981. In 1985, she graduated from Tartu State University's Department of Economics, and the Estonian Business School in 1999 with a degree in International Business Management.
