= Kärdla =

Town in Estonia

- Town
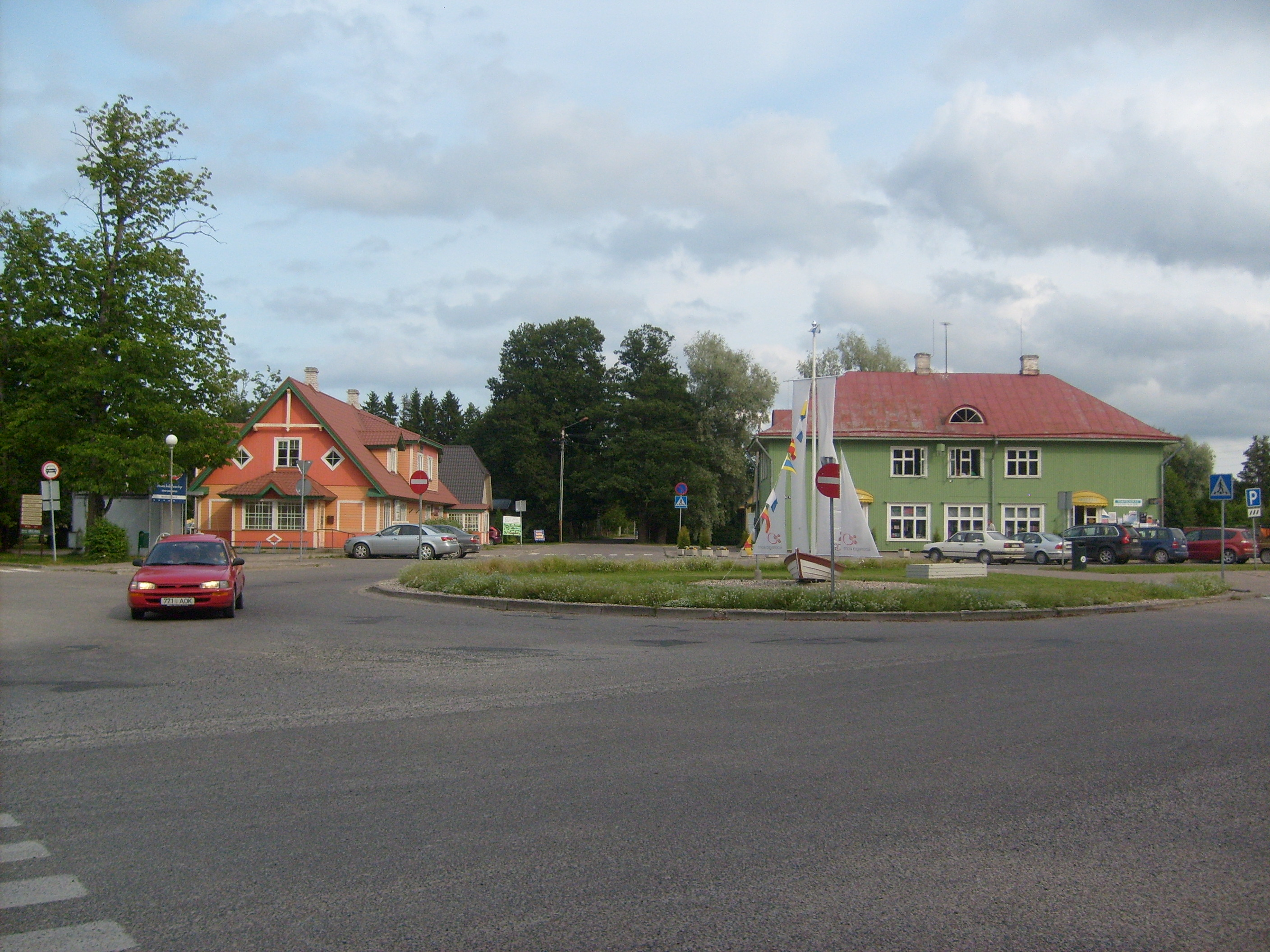
- Town square

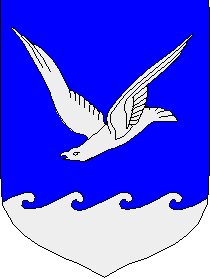
- Flag Coat of arms

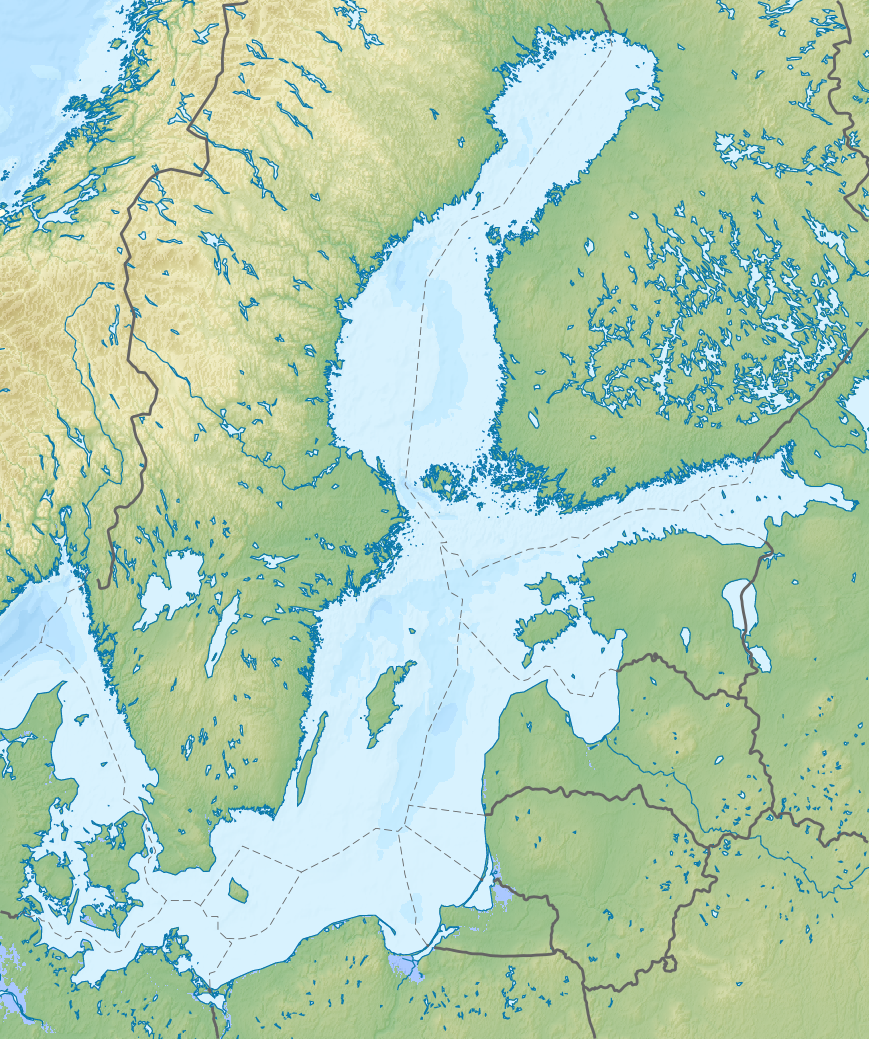
- Location of Kärdla by the Baltic Sea Location in Estonia Location in Europe
- Coordinates: 58°59′53″N 22°44′48″E
- Country: Estonia
- County: Hiiu County
- Municipality: Hiiumaa Parish
- Town status: 1938

Government
  - Chairman of the District Council: Tõnis Paljasma

Area
  - Total: 4.5 km^{2} (1.7 sq mi)

Population (2024)
  - Total: 2,921
  - Rank: 28th
  - Density: 650/km^{2} (1,700/sq mi)

Ethnicity
  - Estonians: 98.2%
  - others: 1.8%
- Time zone: UTC+2 (EET)
  - Summer (DST): UTC+3 (EEST)
- Postal code: 92401 to 92420

Kärdla (Estonian pronunciation: [ˈkærˑ'dlɑ]; Swedish: Kärrdal; German: Kertel) is the only town on the island of Hiiumaa, Estonia. It is the capital of Hiiu County and the administrative center of Hiiumaa Parish. The Chairman of the District Council of Kärdla is Tõnis Paljasma.

== Geography ==
Kärdla is located on the northeastern coast of Hiiumaa, by the Tareste Bay; to the southeast of the town lies the 455 million year old Kärdla meteorite crater. Several small rivers flow through the town. There are also artesian wells in Kärdla. The Swedish name Kärrdal means "marsh valley"; the town is located in a lowlands valley.

== History ==
Kärdla was first mentioned in 1564 as a village inhabited by Swedes. Its growth was greatly influenced by the cloth factory founded in 1830. A port was built in 1849. Both the port and the factory were destroyed in World War II.

Kärdla officially became a borough in 1920, and a town in 1938. In 2013 the town was merged with Kõrgessaare Parish to establish Hiiumaa Parish, therefore Kärdla lost its municipality status.

== Demographics ==
Ethnic composition 1922-2021
Ethnicity	1922		1934		1941		1959		1970		1979		1989		2000		2011		2021	
Ethnicity	amount	%	amount	%	amount	%	amount	%	amount	%	amount	%	amount	%	amount	%	amount	%	amount	%
Estonians	1503	95.1	1390	95.6	1172	98.5	2156	80.2	6766	96.7	3167	92.4	3866	93.4	3684	97.6	2994	98.2	2988	98.1
Russians	10	0.63	27	1.86	13	1.09	-	-	172	2.46	187	5.46	184	4.45	53	1.40	27	0.89	24	0.79
Ukrainians	-	-	1	0.07	-	-	-	-	25	0.36	27	0.79	30	0.72	7	0.19	6	0.20	6	0.20
Belarusians	-	-	-	-	-	-	-	-	11	0.16	14	0.41	16	0.39	5	0.13	6	0.20	3	0.10
Finns	-	-	0	0.00	1	0.08	-	-	6	0.09	2	0.06	3	0.07	4	0.11	4	0.13	7	0.23
Jews	0	0.00	0	0.00	0	0.00	-	-	0	0.00	0	0.00	0	0.00	0	0.00	0	0.00	0	0.00
Latvians	-	-	1	0.07	1	0.08	-	-	3	0.04	11	0.32	5	0.12	5	0.13	5	0.16	4	0.13
Germans	29	1.84	24	1.65	-	-	-	-	-	-	1	0.03	4	0.10	2	0.05	2	0.07	0	0.00
Tatars	-	-	0	0.00	-	-	-	-	-	-	5	0.15	5	0.12	0	0.00	0	0.00	0	0.00
Poles	-	-	1	0.07	0	0.00	-	-	-	-	2	0.06	3	0.07	2	0.05	1	0.03	0	0.00
Lithuanians	-	-	0	0.00	0	0.00	-	-	2	0.03	0	0.00	2	0.05	0	0.00	0	0.00	0	0.00
unknown	1	0.06	1	0.07	1	0.08	0	0.00	0	0.00	0	0.00	0	0.00	7	0.19	1	0.03	6	0.20
other	37	2.34	9	0.62	2	0.17	532	19.8	13	0.19	10	0.29	21	0.51	4	0.11	4	0.13	8	0.26
Total	1580	100	1454	100	1190	100	2688	100	6998	100	3426	100	4139	100	3773	100	3050	100	3046	100

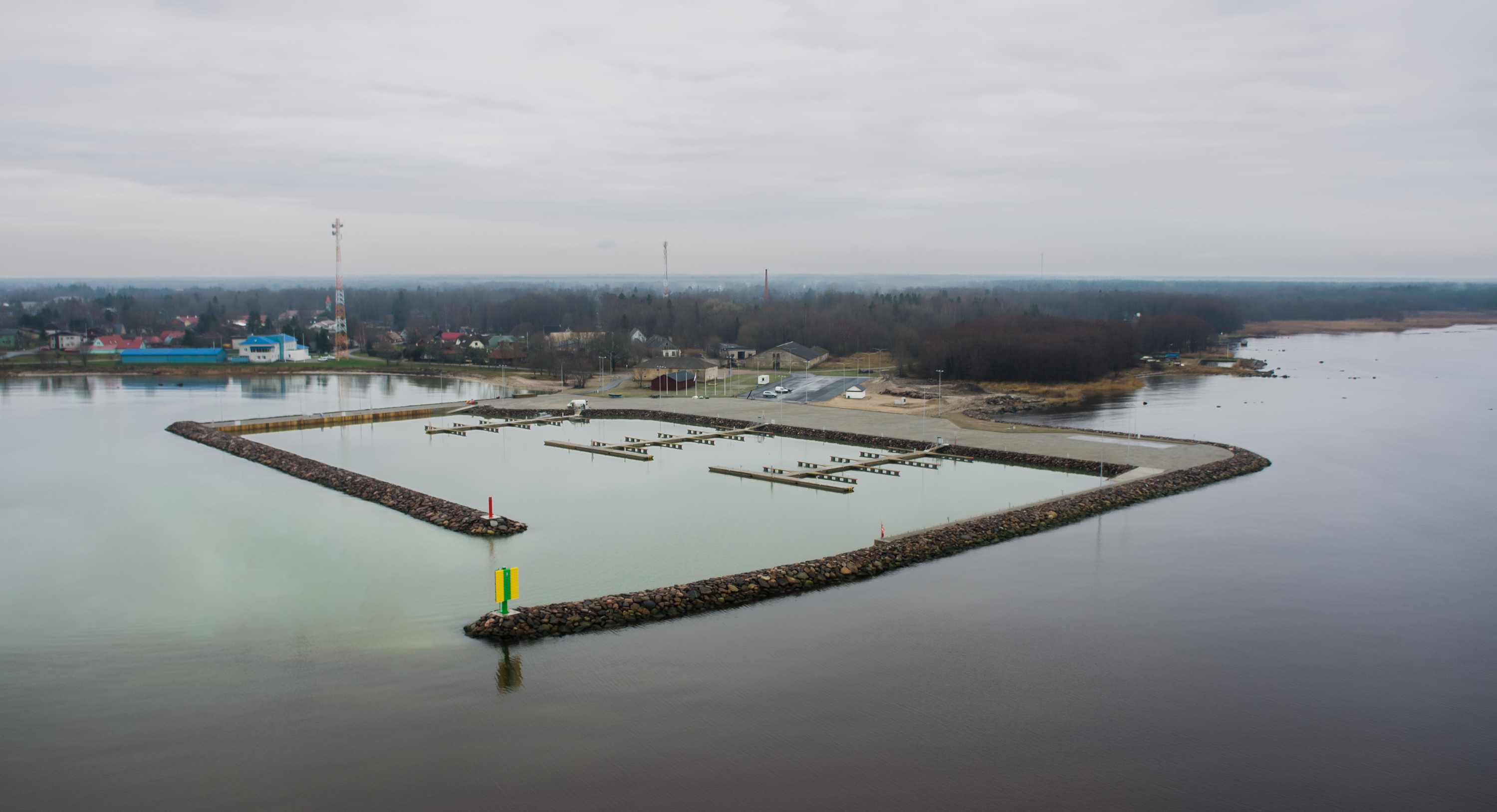
Kärdla harbor

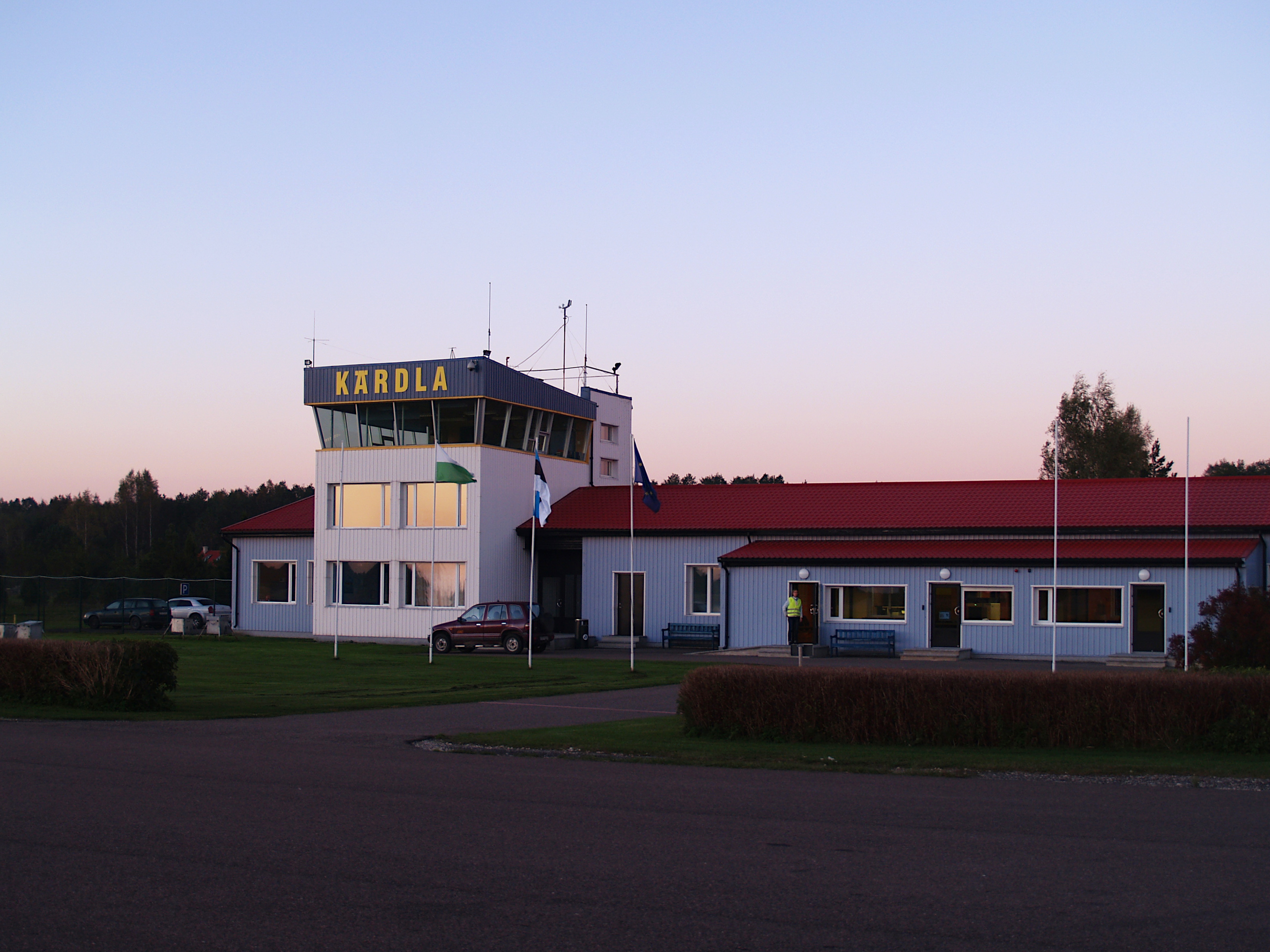
Kärdla Airport

== Transport ==
Road transport from Estonian mainland to Hiiumaa involves a 90-minute (28 km (17 mi)) ferry crossing from Rohuküla to Heltermaa, which is 25 kilometers (16 miles) by road from Kärdla. There are up to 10 ferry departures a day operated by TS Laevad. In the summer weekends, getting car space on the ferry usually requires advance booking. There are about 2 scheduled buses a day between Tallinn (the capital of Estonia) and Kärdla.

There are no scheduled passenger boats directly to Kärdla.

Kärdla is served by Kärdla Airport, with regular flights to Tallinn.

Kärdla town itself is small enough to get around on foot. Bicycle rental is available, and there is a good bicycle path built from Kärdla towards Kõrgessaare.

== Events ==
June's first weekend annual Hiiumaa Children's festival takes place.

In the first week of August, the coffee-loving people of Kärdla expect visitors to Kärdla Cafés' Day celebrated just for one day in their own gardens, serving coffee and home-made pastry.

== Notable people ==
- Benno Richard Ottow (1884–1975), a Baltic German surgeon, gynecologist and naturalist.
- Elmar Tampõld (1920–2013), Estonian-Canadian architect
- Theodor Kolobow (1931-2018), an American physician, scientist, physiologist and inventor of medical devices
- Hillar Eller (1939–2010), politician and long distance runner
- Erkki-Sven Tüür (born 1959), composer
- Ene Kaups (born 1963), politician, Mayor of Kärdla, 2005-2007
- Eveli Saue (born 1984), biathlete and orienteer
- Marianna Liik (born 1992), composer

== International relations ==
=== Twin towns – Sister cities ===
The former municipality of Kärdla (until 2013) was twinned with:

- - Georgioupoli, Greece

== Gallery ==
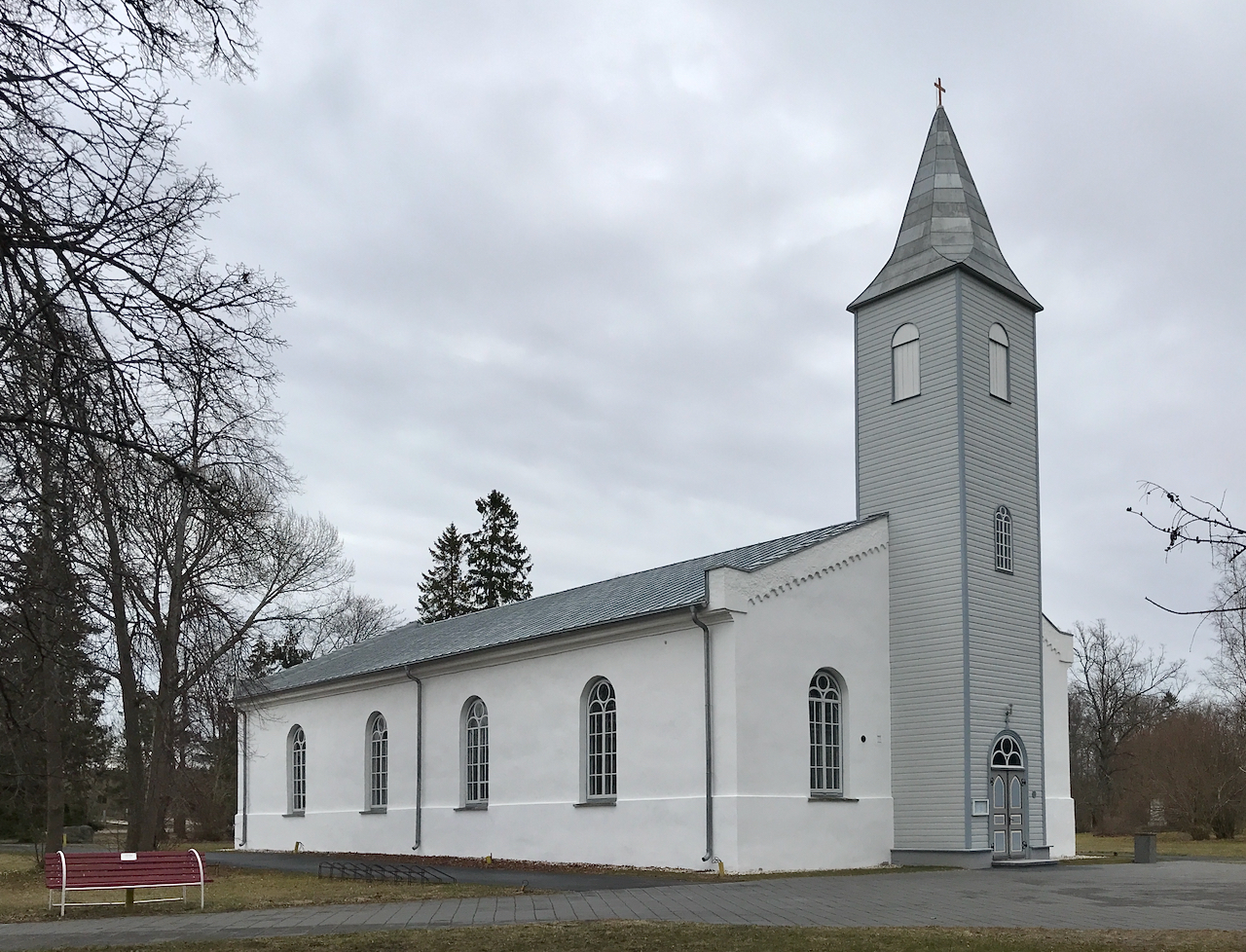
St. John the Baptist Lutheran Church

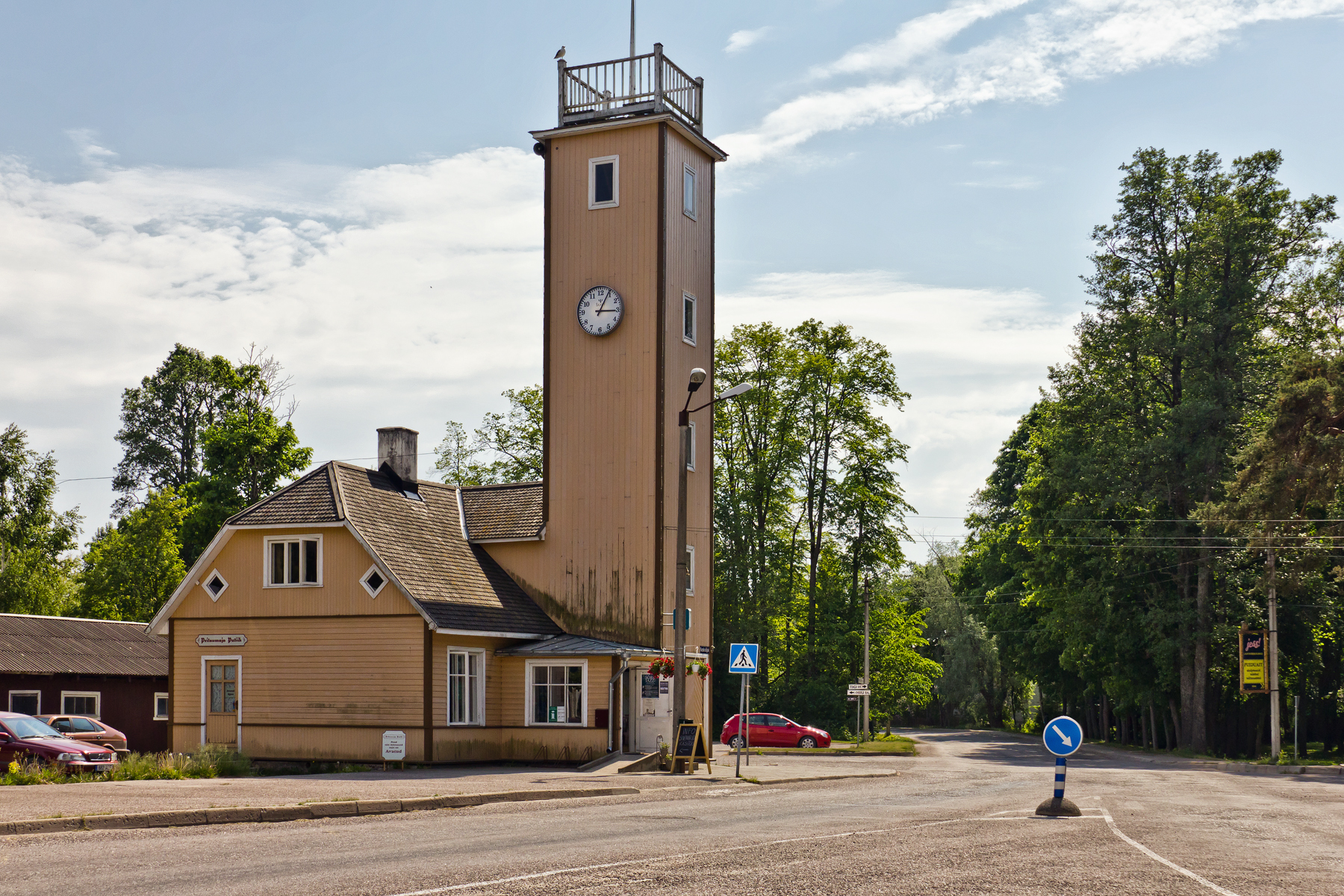
Kärdla fire station

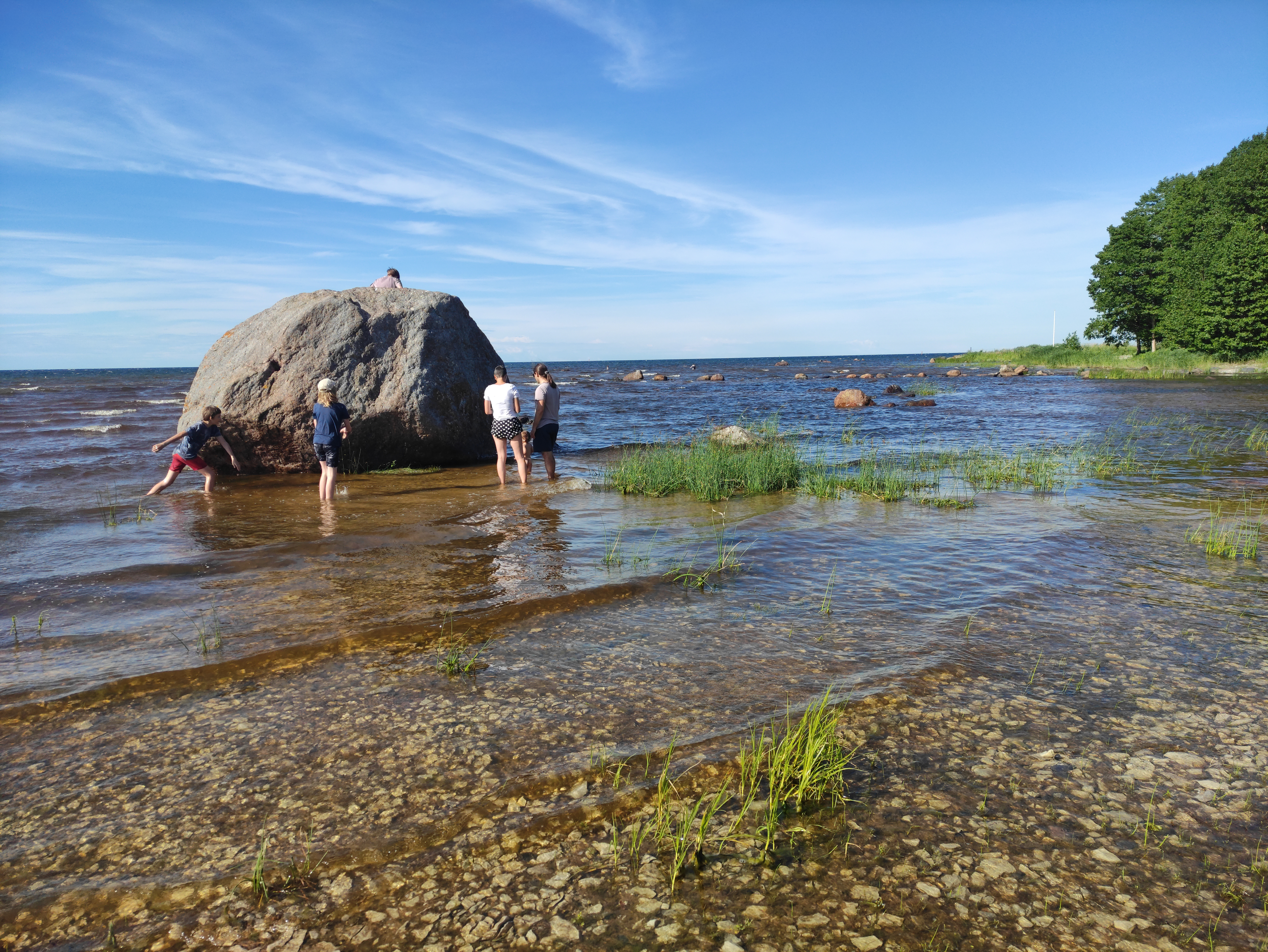
Kärdla beach stone

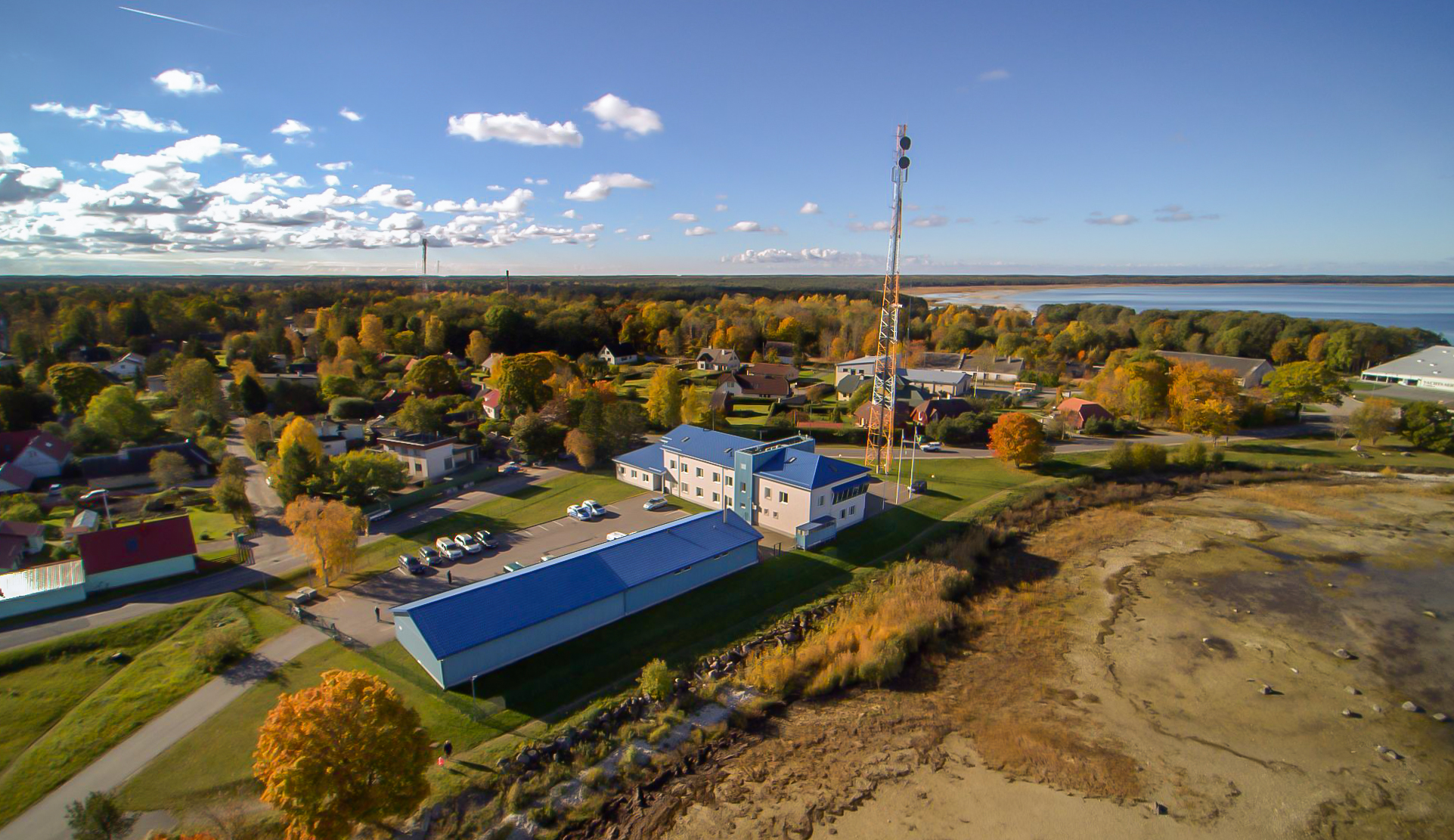
Hiiumaa police station in Kärdla

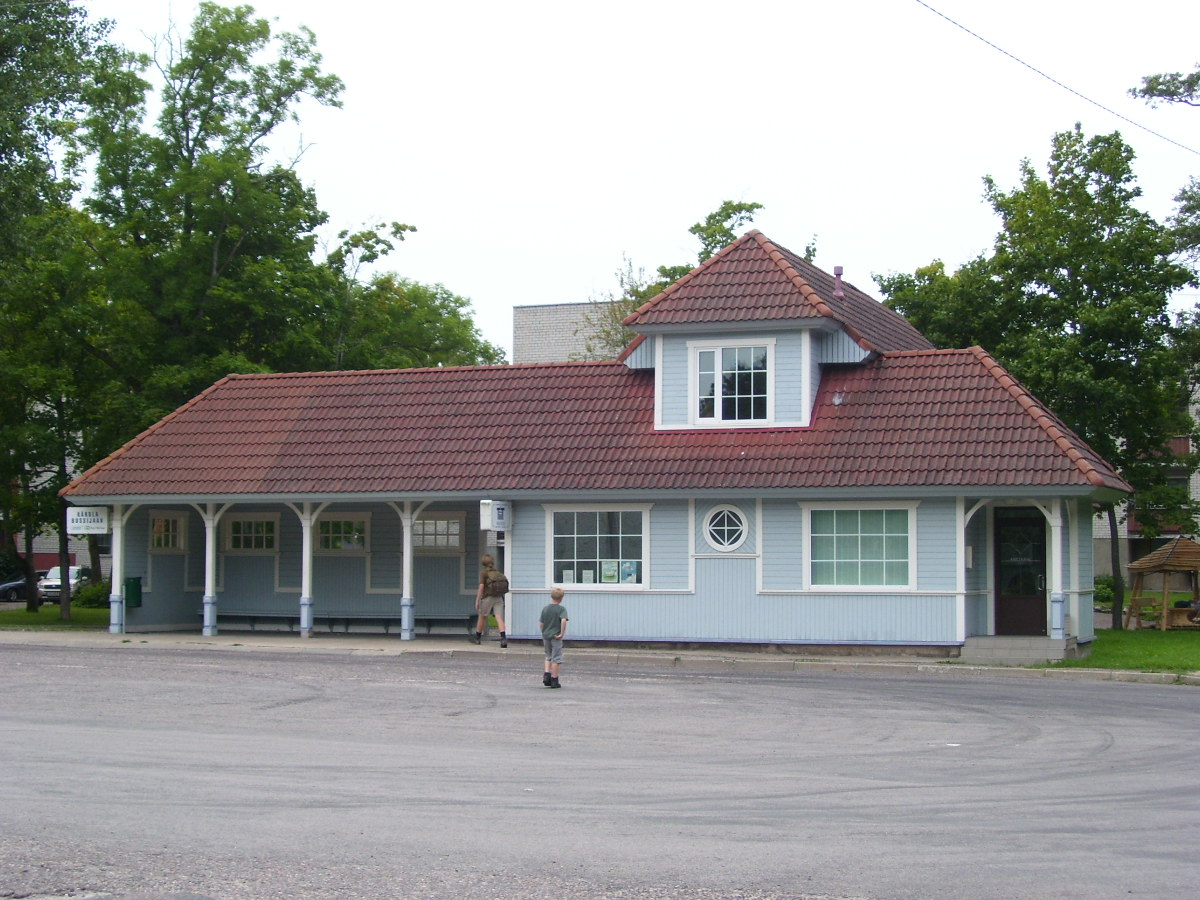
Kärdla bus station
