= Kärdla Airport =

Estonian airport

Kärdla Airport Kärdla lennujaam
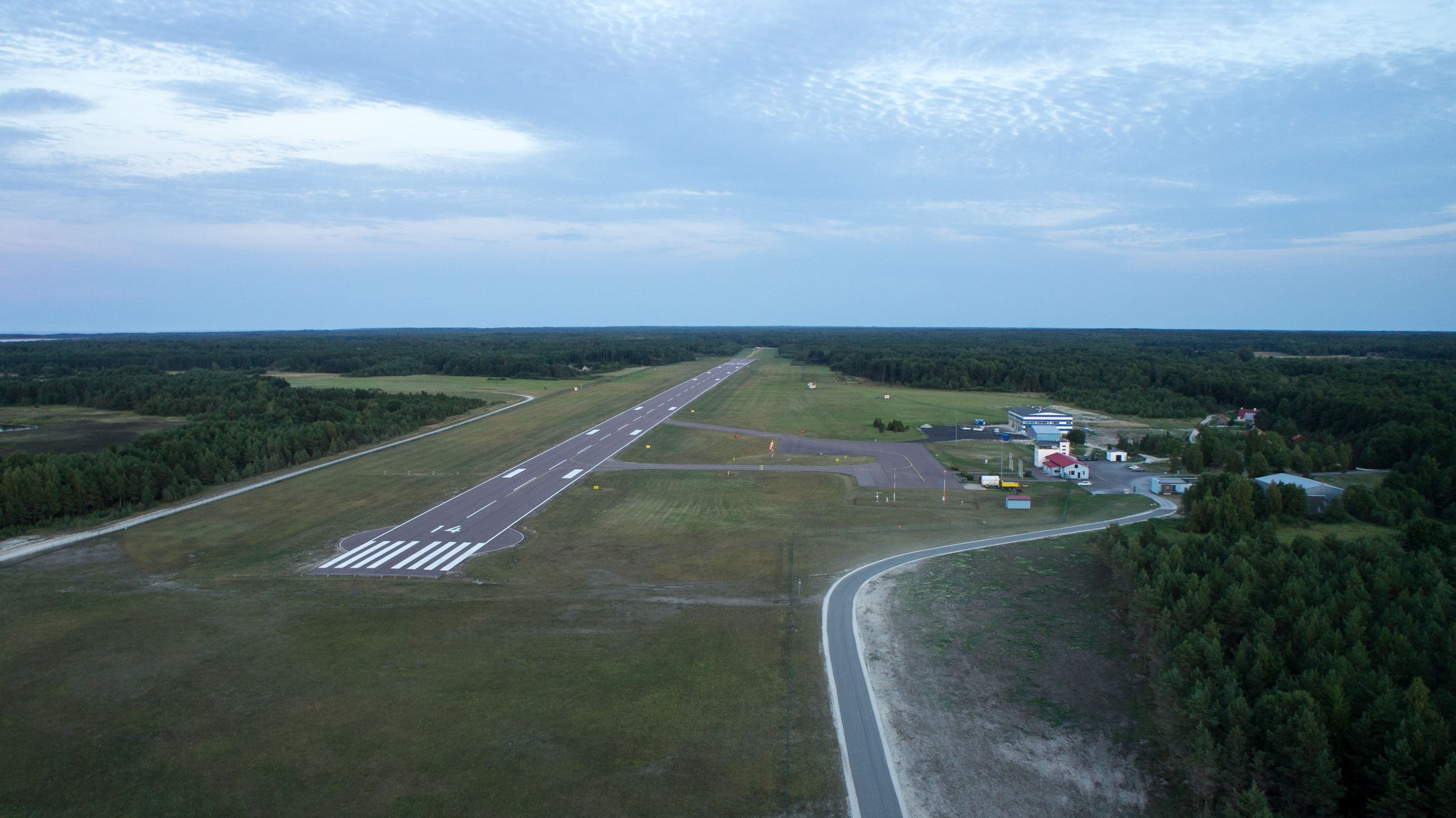
- IATA: KDL; ICAO: EEKA

Summary
- Airport type: Public
- Operator: SC Kärdla Airport
- Serves: Kärdla, Estonia
- Elevation AMSL: 18 ft (5.5 m)
- Coordinates: 58°59′27″N 022°49′51″E

Map
- Location in Estonia

Runways
Direction	Length		Surface
Direction	m	ft	Surface
14/32	1,520	4,987	Asphalt

Statistics (2025)
- Passengers: 11,909
- Cargo (tonnes): 0,0
- Sources: Estonian AIP

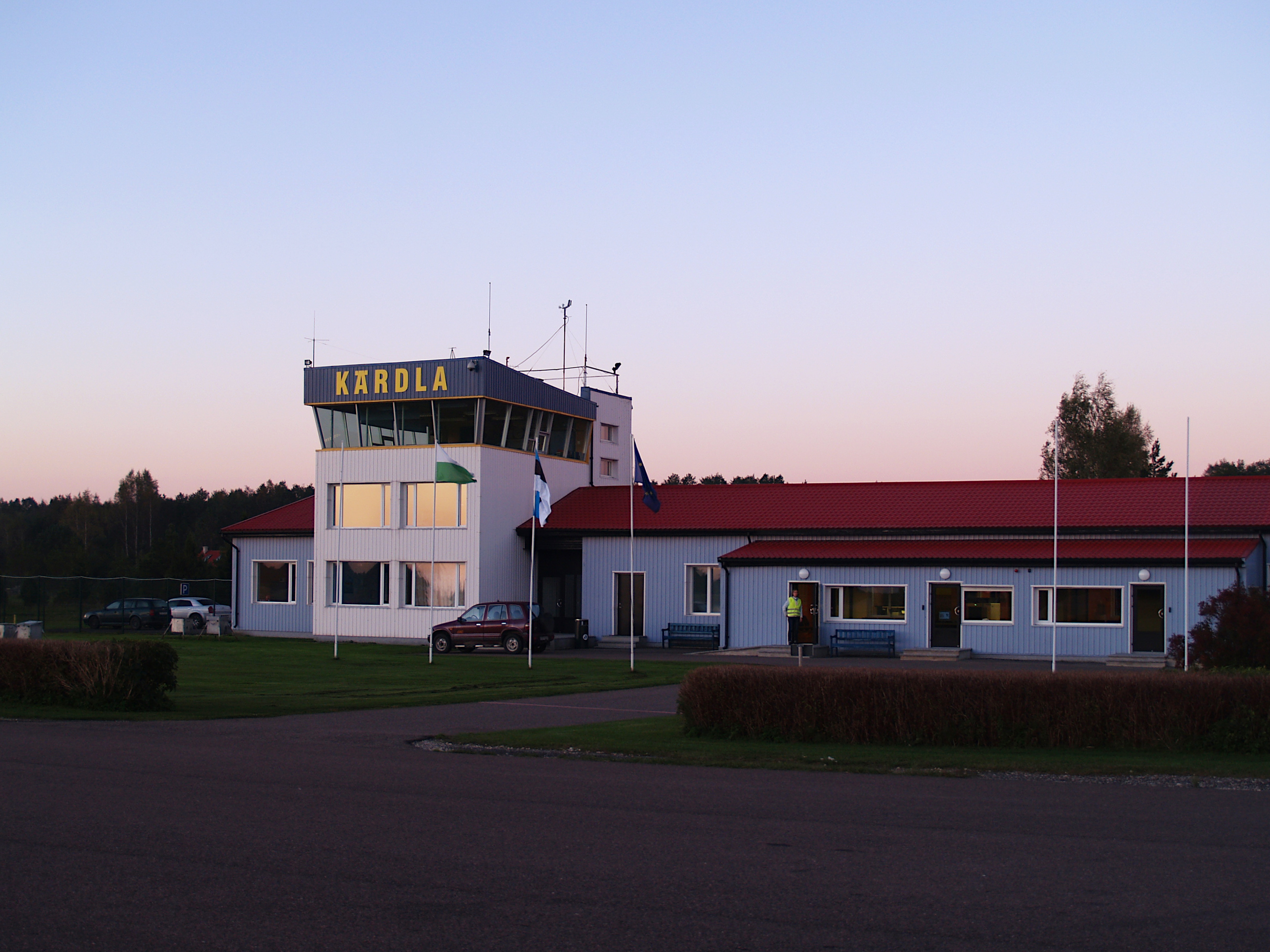
Terminal building

Kärdla Airport (Estonian: Kärdla lennujaam, IATA: KDL, ICAO: EEKA) is an airport in Estonia. The airport is situated 7 nautical miles (13 km; 8.1 mi) east of the town of Kärdla on Hiiumaa island.

The airport has one asphalt runway, 14/32, and is 1,520 m × 30 m (4,987 ft × 98 ft). The runway was upgraded in 1998.

== Overview ==
Kärdla Airport opened in 1963. During the next years there was fairly high activity at the airport, with regular flights to Tallinn, Haapsalu, Vormsi, Kuressaare, Riga, Pärnu, Viljandi, and Tartu, and charter flights to Murmansk, Vilnius, and Kaunas. 24,335 passengers travelled via Kärdla Airport in 1987. Air traffic sank dramatically after Estonia regained its independence in 1991, and in 1995, only 727 passengers traveled via the airport. Since then, traffic has increased, and 10,551 passengers travelled via the airport in 2010.

The airport has annual Flight Days in the first weekend of August.

On November 23, 2001, two died after an Antonov An-28 crashed en route to Kärdla. An investigation found that pilot error was the cause, but a court later ruled that bad weather – not the pilot – was responsible for the crash.

== Airlines and destinations ==
Airlines	Destinations
NyxAir	Tallinn

== Statistics ==
List of the busiest airports in the Baltic states
