= French Guiana =

Overseas department of France

Guyane (French)
Lagwiyann (Guianese Creole French)
Other local names
- - Haitian Creole: Giyàn franse
  - Ndyuka: Soolankondee
  - Portuguese: Guiana Francesa
  - Sranan Tongo: Franskayanakondre
- Overseas department, region and single territorial collectivity of France and outermost region of the European Union
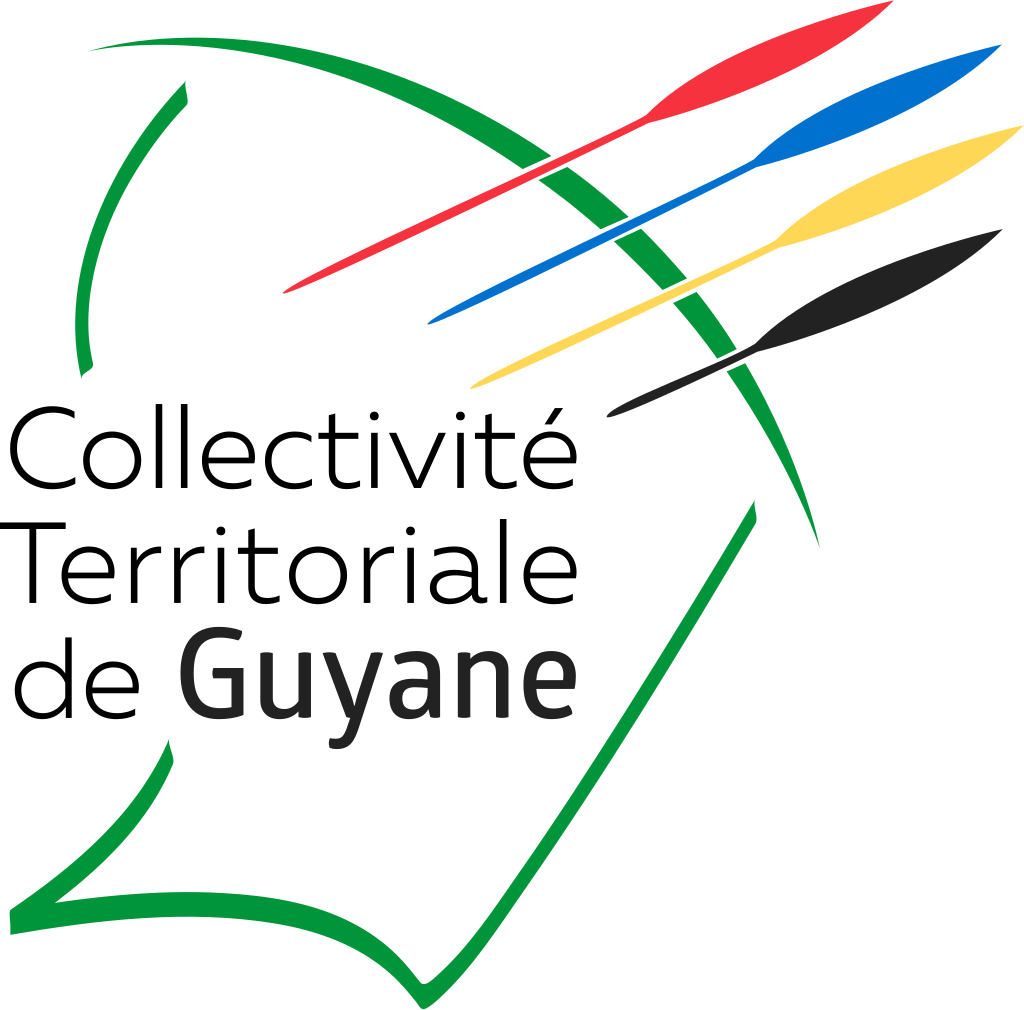
- Coat of arms Official logo
- Motto(s): "Liberté, Égalité, Fraternité" (French) (English: "Liberty, Equality, Fraternity") "Fert Aurum Industria" (Latin) (English: "Work Creates Abundance")
- Anthem: La Marseillaise ("The Marseillaise") Chant du départ ("Song of the Departure") (Note: "Chant du départ" is unofficially the regional anthem.)
- Coordinates: 4°N 53°W
- Sovereign state: France
- Prefecture (and largest city): Cayenne
- Departments: 1 (every overseas region consists of a department in itself)

Government
  - Prefect: Antoine Poussier
  - President of the Assembly: Jean-Paul Fereira (acting)
  - Legislature: Assembly of French Guiana

Area
  - Total: 84,000 km^{2} (32,000 sq mi)
  - Land: 83,534 km^{2} (32,253 sq mi)
  - Water: 466 km^{2} (180 sq mi)
  - Rank: 2nd region and 1st department

Population (January 2026)
  - Total: 298,554
  - Density: 3.5740/km^{2} (9.2567/sq mi)
- Demonym(s): French Guianan; French Guianese

Languages
  - Official: French
  - Regional: French Guianese Creole, various others

GDP
  - Total: €5.244 billion (2024)
  - Per capita: €17,657 (2024)
- Time zone: UTC−03:00 (GFT)
- Area code: +594
- ISO 3166 code: GF; FR-973
- Currency: Euro (€) (EUR)
- Website: Territorial Collectivity; Prefecture
- Unofficial flag of French Guiana

French Guiana, (Note: French: Guyane française [ɡɥi.jan fʁɑ̃.sɛz]; French Guianese Creole: Lagwiyann fransé; Haitian Creole: Giyàn franse [ɡijan fɣãse]; Portuguese: Guiana Francesa [ɡiˈɐ̃.nɐ fɾɐ̃ˈse.zɐ]; Sranan Tongo: Franskayanakondre [fɾanskajanakondɾe] or Franskayana [fɾanskajana]; Eastern Maroon Creole: Soolankondee (lit. 'Saint-Laurent country' or just Soolan) also known by its French name Guyane (lit. 'Guiana'), (Note: /ɡiˈɑːnə/ or /ɡiˈænə/; French: [ɡɥijan]; French Guianese Creole: Lagwiyann [la.ɡwi.jãn]; Haitian Creole: Giyàn [ɡijan]; Portuguese: Guiana [ɡiˈɐ̃.nɐ]; Sranan Tongo: Kayanakondre [kajanakondɾe], Kayana [fɾanskajana] or colloquially Franssei [fɾansːei̯] (lit. 'French side'); Eastern Maroon Creole: Soolan (lit. 'Saint-Laurent' or colloquially Faansise (lit. 'French side')) is an overseas department and region of France located on the northern coast of South America in the Guianas and the West Indies. Bordered by Suriname to the west and Brazil to the east and south, French Guiana covers a total area of 84,000 km^{2} (32,000 sq mi) and a land area of 83,534 km^{2} (32,253 sq mi). As of January 2026, it is home to 298,554 people.

French Guiana is the second-largest region of France, being approximately one-seventh the size of European France, and the largest outermost region within the European Union. It has a very low population density, with only 3.88 inhabitants per square kilometre (10.0/sq mi). About half of its residents live in its capital, Cayenne. Approximately 98.9% of French Guiana is covered by forests, much of it primeval rainforest. Guiana Amazonian Park, the largest national park in the European Union, covers 41% of French Guiana's territory.

Since December 2015, both the region and department have been ruled by a single assembly within the framework of a single territorial collectivity, the French Guiana Territorial Collectivity. (Note: French: Collectivité territoriale de Guyane) This assembly, the French Guiana Assembly, (Note: French: Assemblée de Guyane) replaced the former regional council and departmental council, which were dissolved. The French Guiana Assembly is in charge of regional and departmental government. Until September 30, 2026, its president was Gabriel Serville.

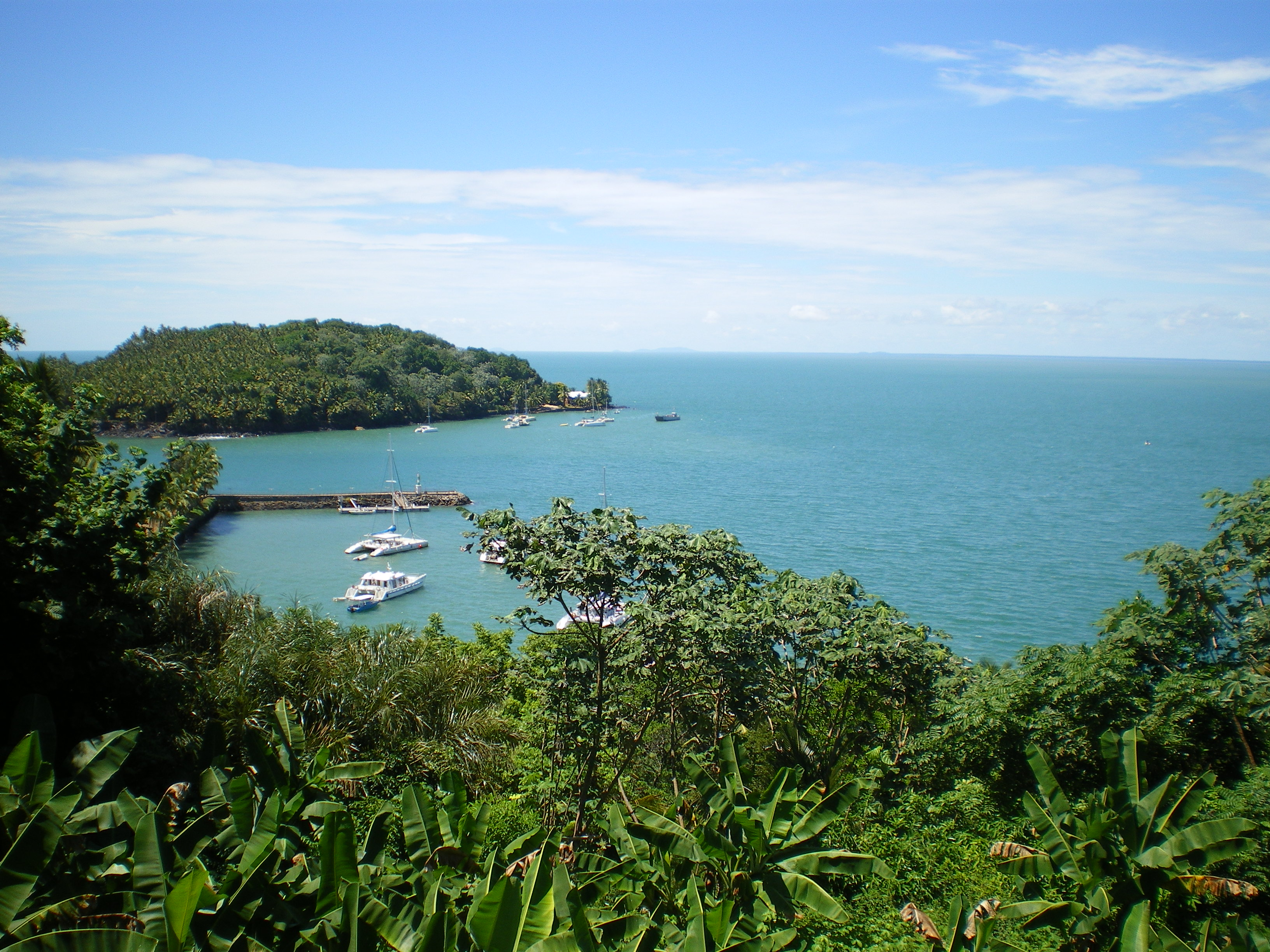
View from Salvation Islands, Kourou

Fully integrated in the French Republic since 1946, French Guiana is a part of the European Union, and its official currency is the euro. A large part of French Guiana's economy depends on jobs and businesses associated with the presence of the Guiana Space Centre, now the European Space Agency's primary launch site near the equator. As elsewhere in France, the official language is standard French, but each ethnic community has its own language, of which French Guianese Creole, a French-based creole language, is the most widely spoken. French Guiana is the only territory on the continental mainland of the Americas that is still under the sovereignty of a European state.

The border between French Guiana and Brazil is the longest land border that France shares with another country, as well as one of only two borders that France shares with non-European states, the other being the border with Suriname in the west.

== Name ==
Map of northern South America showing the extent of the Guyanas region

According to the Oxford English Dictionary, the name "Guyana" is an indigenous term meaning "land of many waters". The addition of the adjective "French" in most languages other than French is rooted in colonial times, when five such colonies (The Guianas) had been named along the coast, subject to differing powers: namely (from west to east) Spanish Guiana (now Guayana Region in Venezuela), British Guiana (now Guyana), Dutch Guiana (now Suriname), French Guiana, and Portuguese Guiana (now Amapá in Brazil). French Guiana and the two larger countries to the west, Guyana and Suriname, are still often collectively referred to as "the Guianas" and lie largely on the elevated landmass of the Guiana Shield.

== History ==
=== Indigenous inhabitants and early French attempts at colonization ===
French Guiana was originally (and still is) inhabited by Indigenous people: Kalina or Galibi (speaking languages of the Cariban family), Lokono or Arawak (speaking languages of the Arawakan family), Palikur (Arawakan), Teko or Emerillon (Tupian), Wayampi (Tupian), and Wayana (Cariban). The French attempted to create a colony in the region in the 16th century in conjunction with its settlement of some Caribbean islands, such as Guadeloupe and Saint-Domingue. The first French establishment is recorded in 1503, but France did not establish a durable presence until colonists founded Cayenne in 1643.

=== Slavery and abolition ===
French Guiana was developed as a slave society, where planters trafficked Africans as enslaved labourers on large sugar and other plantations. The system of slavery in French Guiana continued until the French Revolution, when the National Convention voted to abolish the French slave trade and slavery in France's overseas colonies in February 1794, months after enslaved Haitians had started a slave rebellion in the colony of Saint-Domingue. However, the 1794 decree was only implemented in Saint-Domingue, Guadeloupe and French Guiana, while the colonies of Senegal, Mauritius, Réunion, Martinique and French India resisted the imposition of these laws.

=== Early colonial failures ===
Bill Marshall, Professor of Comparative Cultural Studies at the University of Stirling, wrote of French Guiana's origins:

"The first French effort to colonize Guiana, in 1763, failed utterly when tropical diseases and climate killed all but 2,000 of the initial 12,000 settlers ... During its existence, France transported approximately 56,000 prisoners to Devil's Island. Fewer than 10 percent survived their sentence."

Île du Diable (Devil's Island) was the site of a small prison facility, part of a larger penal system by the same name, which consisted of prisons on three islands and three larger prisons on the mainland. This was operated from 1852 to 1953.

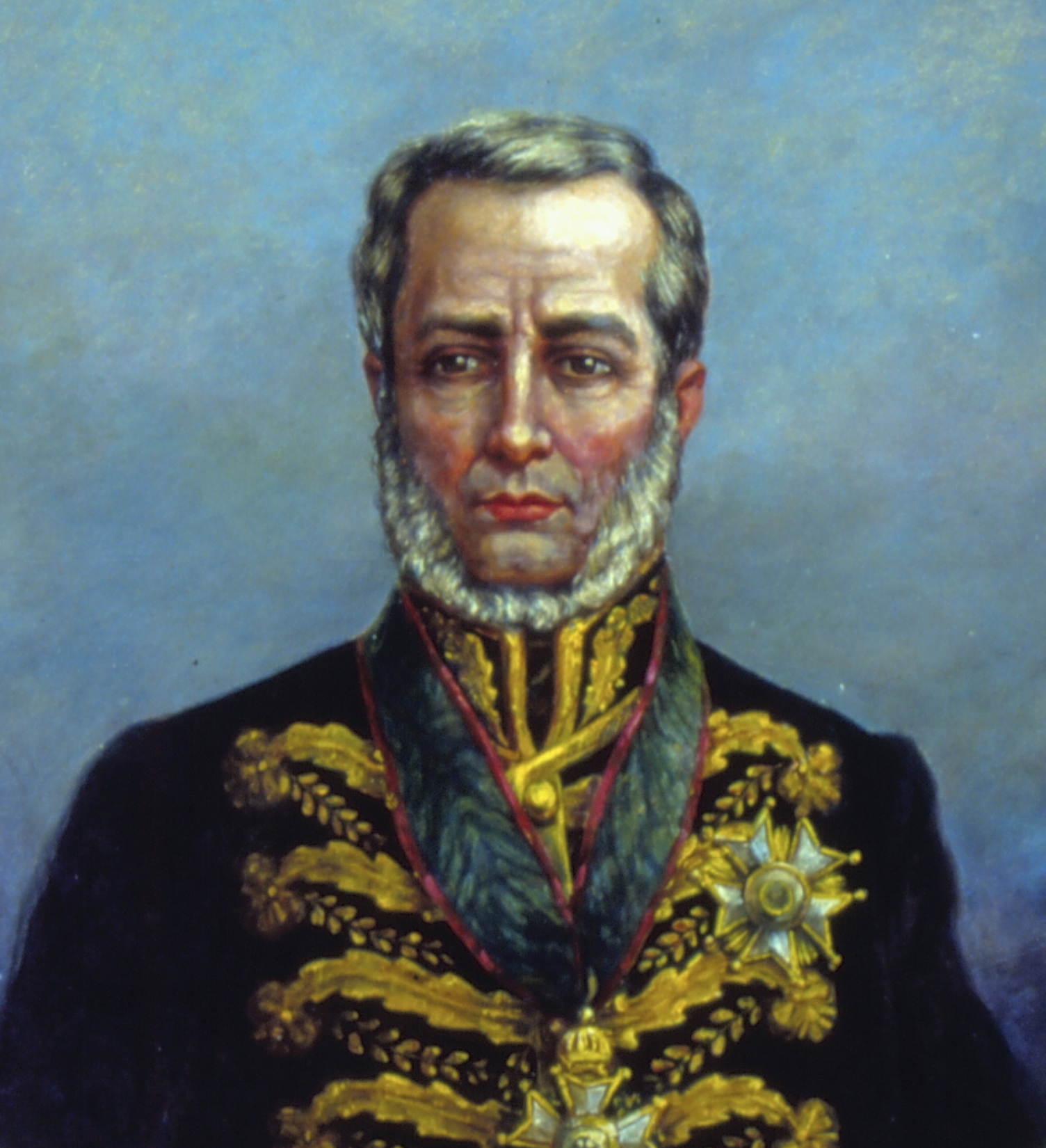
Following the Portuguese conquest of French Guiana in 1809, João Severiano Maciel da Costa served as its only governor until 1817.

In addition, in the late nineteenth century, France began requiring forced residencies by prisoners who survived their hard labour. A Portuguese-British naval squadron took French Guiana for the Portuguese Empire in 1809. It was returned to France with the signing of the Treaty of Paris in 1814. Though Portugal returned the region to France, it kept a military presence until 1817.

After French Guiana was established as a penal colony, officials sometimes used convicts to catch butterflies. The sentences of the convicts were often long, and the prospect of employment very weak, so the convicts caught butterflies to sell in the international market, for both scientific purposes and general collecting.

=== Shifting sovereignty and border disputes ===
A border dispute with Brazil arose in the late 19th century over a vast area of jungle, resulting in the short-lived, pro-French, independent state of Counani in the disputed territory. There was some fighting among settlers. The dispute was resolved largely in favour of Brazil by the arbitration of the Swiss government.

The territory of Inini consisted of most of the interior of French Guiana when it was created in 1930. In 1936, Félix Éboué from Cayenne became the first black man to serve as governor in a French colony.

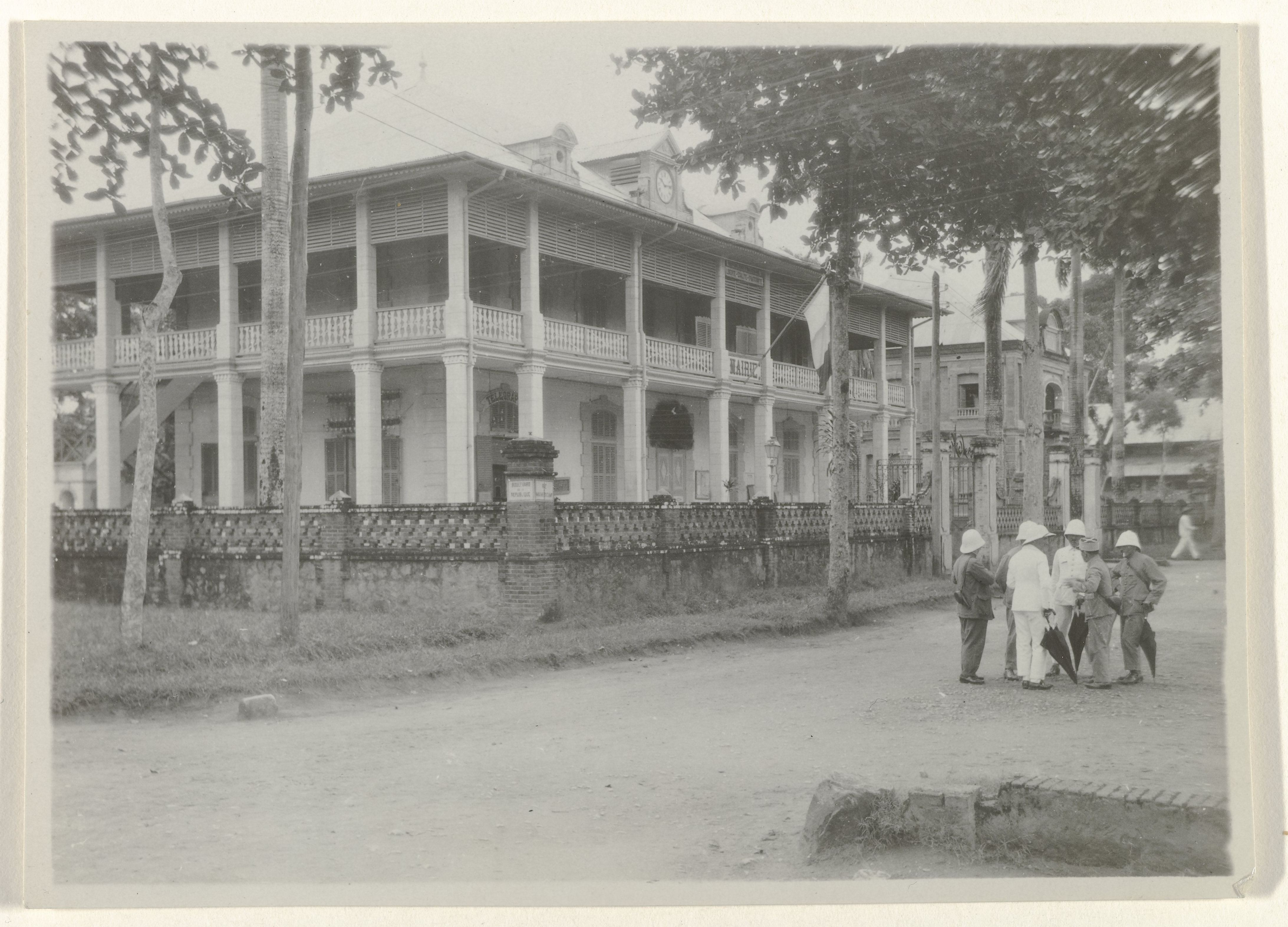
French Guiana, c. 1930

==== World War II ====
During World War II and the fall of France to German forces, French Guiana became part of Vichy France. Guiana officially rallied to Free France on 16 March 1943. It abandoned its colony status and once again became a French department on 19 March 1946 by the Law on Departmentalization.

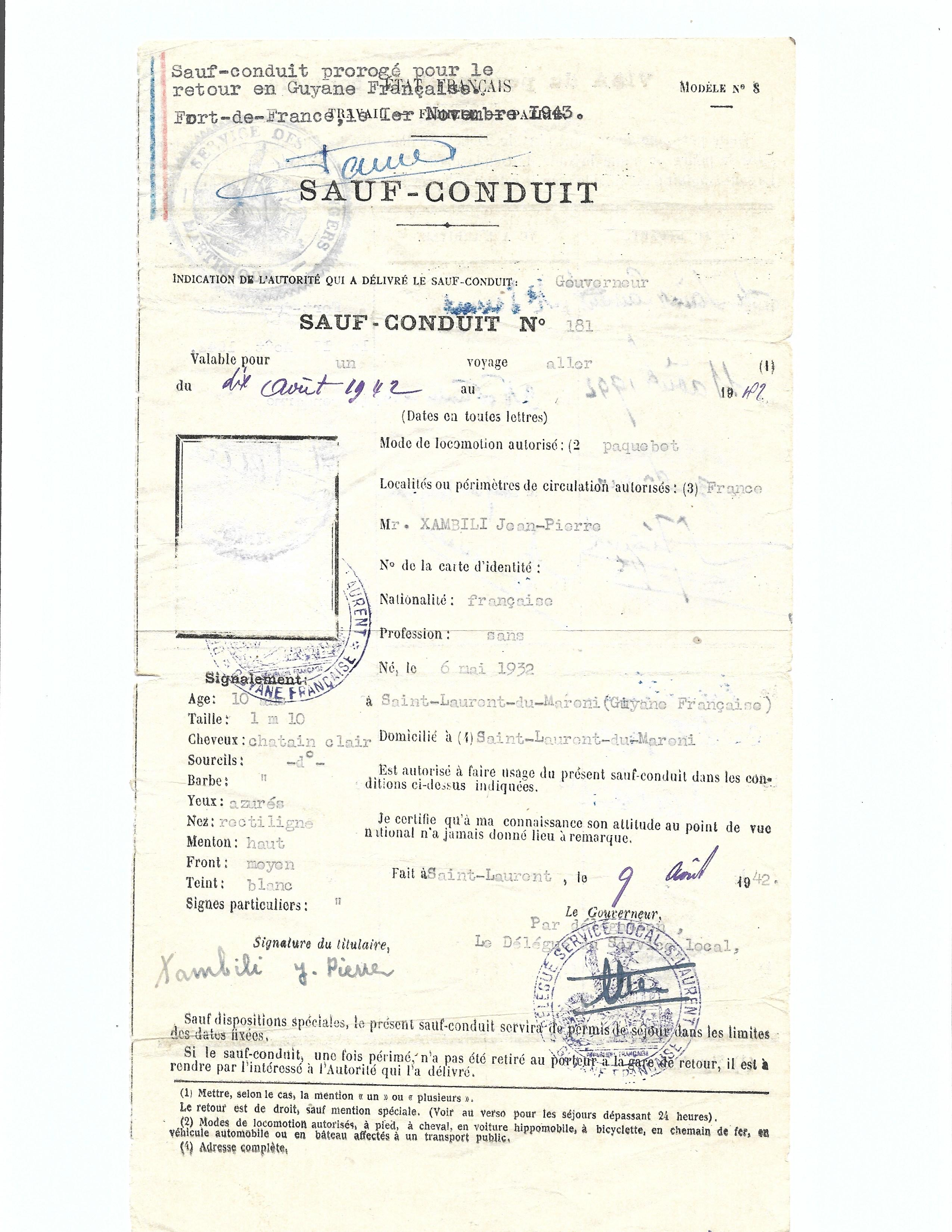
1942 Saint-Laurent-du-Maroni issued French Guiana travel document, South America.

=== Post World Wars ===
Following the French withdrawal from Vietnam in the 1950s after the First Indochina War, and the subsequent Vietnam War, France helped resettle several hundred Hmong refugees from Laos to French Guiana during the 1970s and 80s, who were fleeing displacement after the communist takeover of Laos by Pathet Lao in 1975.

In the late 1980s, more than 10,000 Surinamese refugees, mostly Maroons, arrived in French Guiana, fleeing the Surinamese Civil War.

More recently, French Guiana has received large numbers of Brazilian and Haitian economic migrants. Illegal and ecologically destructive gold mining by Brazilian garimpeiros is a chronic issue in the remote interior rain forest of French Guiana. The region still faces such problems as illegal immigration, poorer infrastructure than mainland France, higher costs of living, higher levels of crime and more common social unrest.

In 1964, French president Charles de Gaulle decided to construct a space-travel base in French Guiana. It was intended to replace the Sahara base in Algeria and stimulate economic growth in French Guiana. The department was considered suitable for the purpose because it is near the equator and has extensive access to the ocean as a buffer zone. The Guiana Space Centre, located a short distance along the coast from Kourou, has grown considerably since the initial launches of the Véronique rockets. It is now part of the European space industry and has had commercial success with such launches as the Ariane 4, Ariane 5, and Ariane flight VA256, which launched the James Webb Space Telescope into space.

In 1996, high school students started an independence movement. In 1997, twelve independence leaders were deported to Guadeloupe, including Jean-Victor Castor, who was elected to the French National Assembly in 2022.

The Guianese General Council officially adopted a departmental flag in 2010. In a referendum that same year, almost 70% French Guiana voters voted against becoming an autonomous overseas collectivity. In a second referendum, transition to a "single territorial collectivity" under Article 73 of the Constitution was approved. Discussions continue concerning greater autonomy called "sui generis", similar to that of Corsica, within France.

On 20 March 2017, French Guianese workers began going on strike and demonstrating for more resources and infrastructure. 28 March 2017 was the day of the largest demonstration ever held in French Guiana. Riots broke out in 2023 following the death of Nahel M in a Paris suburb, which resulted in the death of a government worker from mosquito control office who was on his balcony. President Macron visited the region in 2024 to commemorate French special forces major Arnaud Blanc who died during an operation against illegal gold mining in Maripasoula. Macron also announced funding for joint efforts with Brazil to protect the Amazon and recognized Brazilian Indigenous leader Raoni Metuktire with the Legion of Honor medal for efforts at conserving the rainforest. Macron also visited the Guiana Space Centre and met with mayors, parliamentarians and the president of Guyana before continuing to Brazil to discuss joint efforts to reduce illegal mining.

A new European Ariane 6 rocket was successfully launched from Kourou in 2025 allowing Europe independent access to space. In 2025 the French Ministry of Justice announced plans to build a prison in Saint-Laurent-du-Maroni.

== Geography ==
Geographic map of French Guiana in 2009. Note: this map does not show the international Oyapock River Bridge, which connects Saint-Georges-de-l'Oyapock (France) and Oiapoque (Brazil) and has been open to car traffic since March 2017. The new asphalted road between Saint-Laurent-du-Maroni and Apatou, which was completed in 2010, does not appear on the map either.

French Guiana lies between latitudes 2° and 6° N, and longitudes 51° and 55° W. It consists of two main geographical regions: a coastal strip where the majority of the people live, and dense, near-inaccessible rainforest that gradually rises to the modest peaks of the Tumuc-Humac mountains along the Brazilian frontier. French Guiana's highest peak is Bellevue de l'Inini in Maripasoula (851 m, 2,792 ft). Other mountains include Mont Itoupé (826 m, 2,710 ft), Cottica Mountain (744 m, 2,441 ft), Pic Coudreau (711 m, 2,333 ft), and Kaw Mountain (337 m, 1,106 ft).

Several small islands are found off the coast: the three Salvation's Islands, which include Devil's Island, and the isolated Îles du Connétable bird sanctuary further along the coast towards Brazil.

The Petit-Saut Dam, a hydroelectric dam in the north of French Guiana, forms an artificial lake and provides hydroelectricity. There are many rivers in French Guiana, including the Waki River.

As of 2007, the Amazonian forest, located in the most remote part of the department, is protected as the Guiana Amazonian Park, one of the ten national parks of France. The territory of the park covers some 33,900 km^{2} (13,090 sq mi) upon the communes of Camopi, Maripasoula, Papaïchton, Saint-Élie and Saül.

=== Climate ===
Köppen climate classification of French Guiana

French Guiana has an equatorial climate predominant. Located within six degrees of the Equator and rising only to modest elevations, French Guiana experiences consistently high temperatures and high humidity in all seasons. During most of the year, rainfall across the country is heavy due to the presence of the Intertropical Convergence Zone and its powerful thunderstorm cells. In most parts of French Guiana, rainfall is always heavy especially from December to July – typically over 330 millimetres or 13 inches can be expected each month during this period throughout the department. Between August and November, the eastern half experiences a warm dry season with rainfall below 100 millimetres or 3.94 inches and average high temperatures above 30 °C (86 °F) occurring in September and October, causing eastern French Guiana to be classified as a tropical monsoon climate (Köppen Am); Saint-Laurent-du-Maroni in the west has a tropical rainforest climate (Af).

Climate data for Cayenne (Köppen Am/Af)
Month	Jan	Feb	Mar	Apr	May	Jun	Jul	Aug	Sep	Oct	Nov	Dec	Year
Record high °C (°F)	32.5 (90.5)	32.3 (90.1)	32.2 (90.0)	33.0 (91.4)	33.2 (91.8)	33.7 (92.7)	34.5 (94.1)	35.0 (95.0)	35.2 (95.4)	35.1 (95.2)	34.6 (94.3)	34.1 (93.4)	35.2 (95.4)
Mean daily maximum °C (°F)	29.1 (84.4)	29.2 (84.6)	29.6 (85.3)	29.9 (85.8)	29.9 (85.8)	30.2 (86.4)	30.8 (87.4)	31.6 (88.9)	32.1 (89.8)	32.2 (90.0)	31.5 (88.7)	30.1 (86.2)	30.5 (86.9)
Daily mean °C (°F)	26.2 (79.2)	26.3 (79.3)	26.5 (79.7)	26.8 (80.2)	26.7 (80.1)	26.6 (79.9)	26.6 (79.9)	27.0 (80.6)	27.2 (81.0)	27.3 (81.1)	27.0 (80.6)	26.6 (79.9)	26.7 (80.1)
Mean daily minimum °C (°F)	23.3 (73.9)	23.4 (74.1)	23.5 (74.3)	23.7 (74.7)	23.5 (74.3)	22.9 (73.2)	22.4 (72.3)	22.4 (72.3)	22.2 (72.0)	22.3 (72.1)	22.5 (72.5)	23.1 (73.6)	22.9 (73.2)
Record low °C (°F)	17.4 (63.3)	18.9 (66.0)	18.5 (65.3)	19.0 (66.2)	18.8 (65.8)	18.9 (66.0)	19.0 (66.2)	19.0 (66.2)	18.7 (65.7)	18.6 (65.5)	17.2 (63.0)	18.0 (64.4)	17.2 (63.0)
Average rainfall mm (inches)	451.2 (17.76)	309.4 (12.18)	334.3 (13.16)	448.4 (17.65)	579.4 (22.81)	411.4 (16.20)	245.7 (9.67)	143.6 (5.65)	55.7 (2.19)	63.3 (2.49)	133.4 (5.25)	340.5 (13.41)	3,516.3 (138.44)
Average rainy days (≥ 1.0 mm)	23.6	20.0	20.7	22.2	26.4	25.2	20.6	14.2	7.1	7.6	11.9	21.6	221.1
Average relative humidity (%)	82	80	82	84	85	82	78	74	71	71	76	81	79
Mean monthly sunshine hours	95.1	92.4	120.0	123.5	122.4	150.4	200.5	234.4	253.4	256.4	211.5	143.3	2,003
Source: Meteo France

=== Environment ===
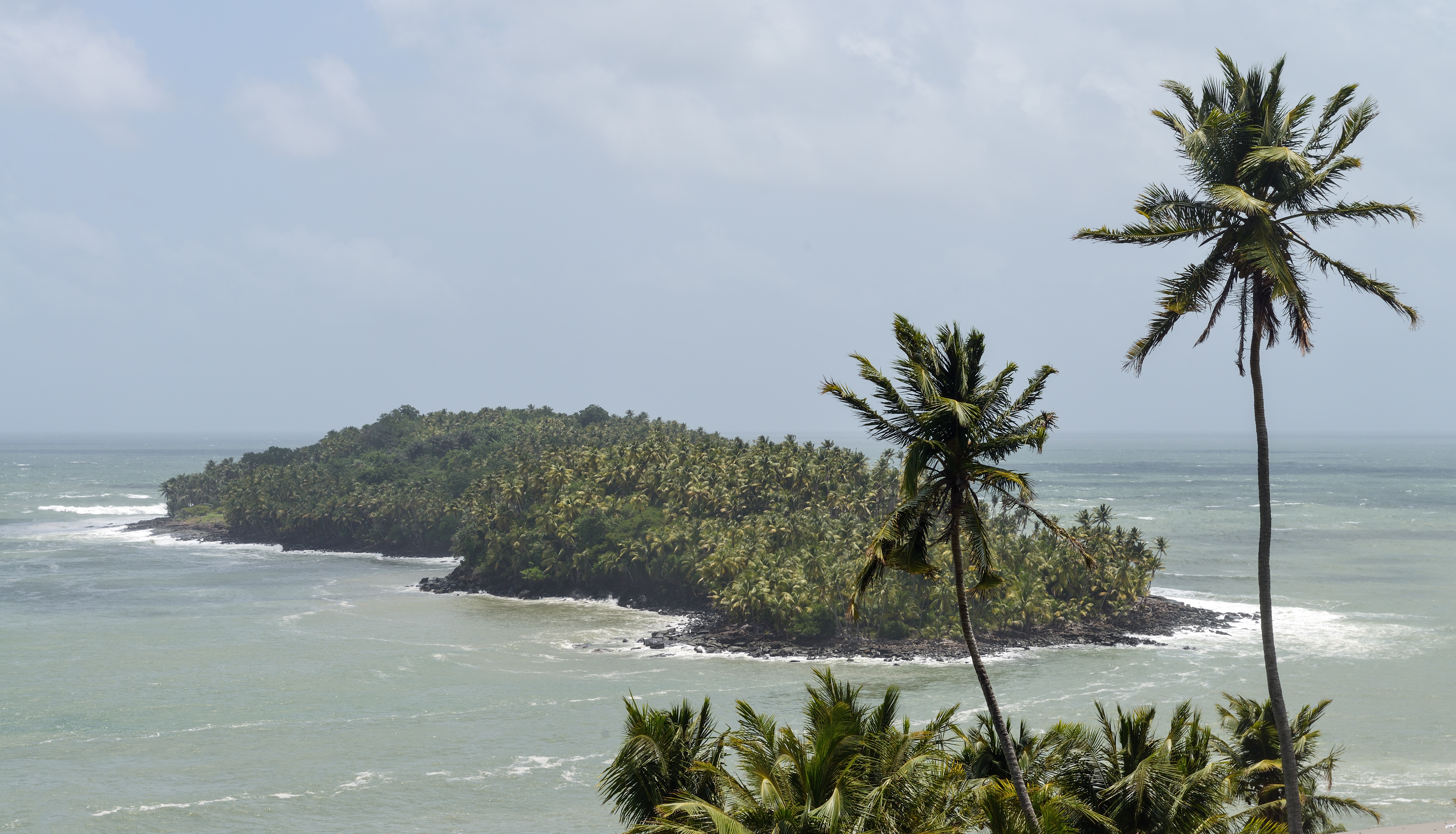
Ile du Diable seen from Ile Royale

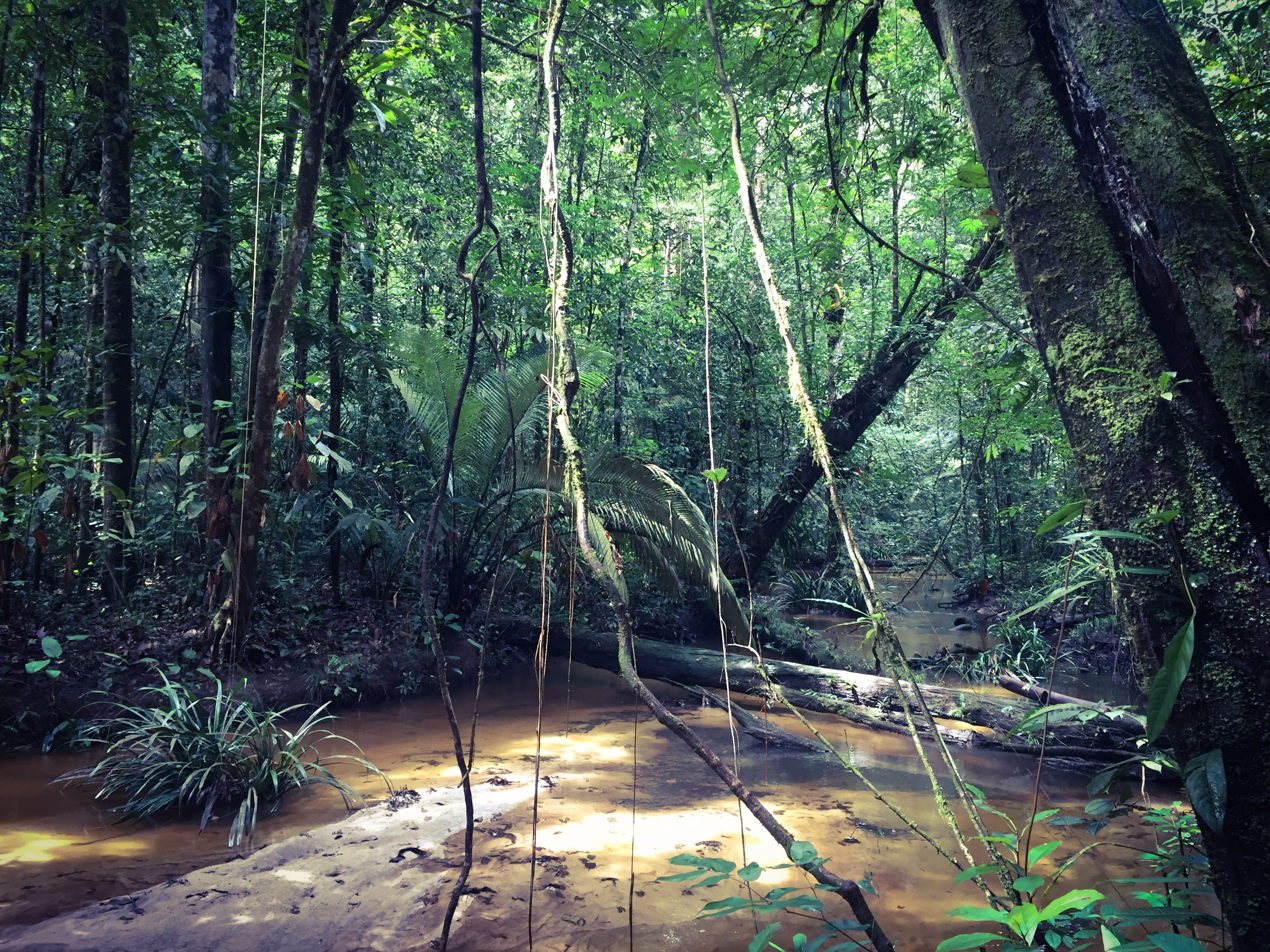
Guiana Amazonian Park

French Guiana is home to many different ecosystems: tropical rainforests, coastal mangroves, savannahs, inselbergs and many types of wetlands. It lies within three ecoregions: Guayanan Highlands moist forests, Guianan moist forests, and Guianan mangroves. French Guiana has a high level of biodiversity of both flora and fauna. This is due to the presence of old-growth forests (i.e., ancient/primary forests), which are biodiversity hotspots. The rainforests of French Guiana provide shelter for many species during dry periods and terrestrial glaciation. These forests are protected by a national park (the Guiana Amazonian Park), seven additional nature reserves, and 17 protected sites. The International Union for Conservation of Nature (IUCN) and the European Union (EU) have recommended special efforts to protect these areas.

Following the Grenelle Environment Round Table of 2007, the Grenelle Law II was proposed in 2009, under law number 2010–788. Article 49 of the law proposed the creation of a single organization responsible for environmental conservation in French Guiana. Article 64 proposes a "departmental plan of mining orientation" for French Guiana, which would promote mining (specifically of gold) that is compatible with requirements for environmental protection. The coastal environment along the RN1 has historically experienced the most changes, but development is occurring locally along the RN2, and also in western French Guiana due to gold mining.

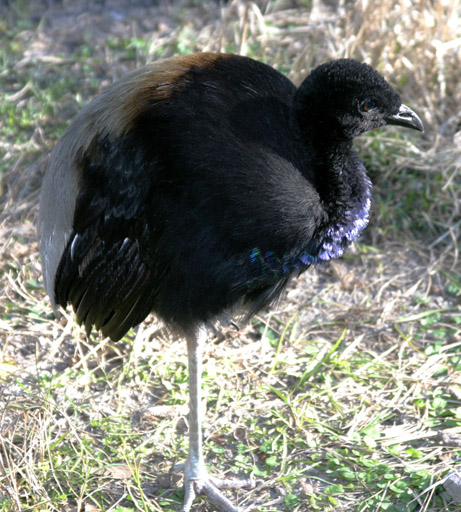
The grey-winged trumpeter, a species of bird commonly found in the region

5,500 plant species have been recorded, including more than a thousand trees, along with 700 species of birds, 177 species of mammals, over 500 species of fish including 45% of which are endemic and 109 species of amphibians. French Guiana's high biodiversity is similar to that of other regions with tropical rainforests, such as the Brazilian Amazon, Borneo and Sumatra.

Environmental threats include habitat fragmentation from roads, which remains very limited compared to other forests of South America; immediate and deferred impacts of EDF's Petit-Saut Dam; gold mining; poor control of hunting and poaching, facilitated by the creation of many tracks; and the introduction of all-terrain vehicles. Logging remains moderate due to the lack of roads, difficult climate, and difficult terrain. The Forest Code of French Guiana was modified by ordinance on 28 July 2005. Logging concessions or free transfers are sometimes granted by local authorities to persons traditionally deriving their livelihood from the forest.

The beaches within the Amana Nature Reserve represent a major nesting location for marine turtles. Specifically, this site is documented as one of the largest leatherback turtle nesting areas globally.

=== Agriculture ===
French Guiana has some of the poorest soils in the world. The soil is low in nutrients (e.g., nitrogen, potassium) and organic matter. Soil acidity is another cause of the poor soils, and it requires farmers to add lime to their fields. The soil characteristics have led to the use of slash and burn agriculture. The resulting ashes elevate soil pH (i.e., lower soil acidity), and contribute minerals and other nutrients to the soil. Sites of Terra preta (anthropogenic soils) have been discovered in French Guiana, particularly near the border with Brazil. Research is being actively pursued in multiple fields to determine how these enriched soils were historically created, and how this can be done in modern times.

== Government and politics ==
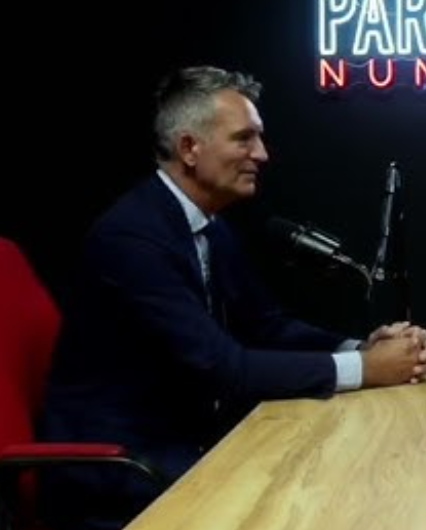
Antoine Poussier
Prefect

Jean-Paul Fereira
President of the Assembly (acting)

Map of the European Union in the world with overseas countries and territories and outermost regions, as of 2020

French Guiana, as part of France, forms part of the European Union – the largest landmass for an area outside of Europe (since Greenland left the European Community in 1985), with one of the longest EU external boundaries. It is one of only three European Union territories outside Europe that is not an island (the others being the Spanish Autonomous Cities in Africa, Ceuta and Melilla). The inhabitants of French Guiana are French citizens with full political and legal rights. As an integral part of France, its head of state is the president of the French Republic, and its head of government is the prime minister of France. The French government and its agencies have responsibility for a wide range of issues that are reserved to the national executive power, such as defense and external relations.

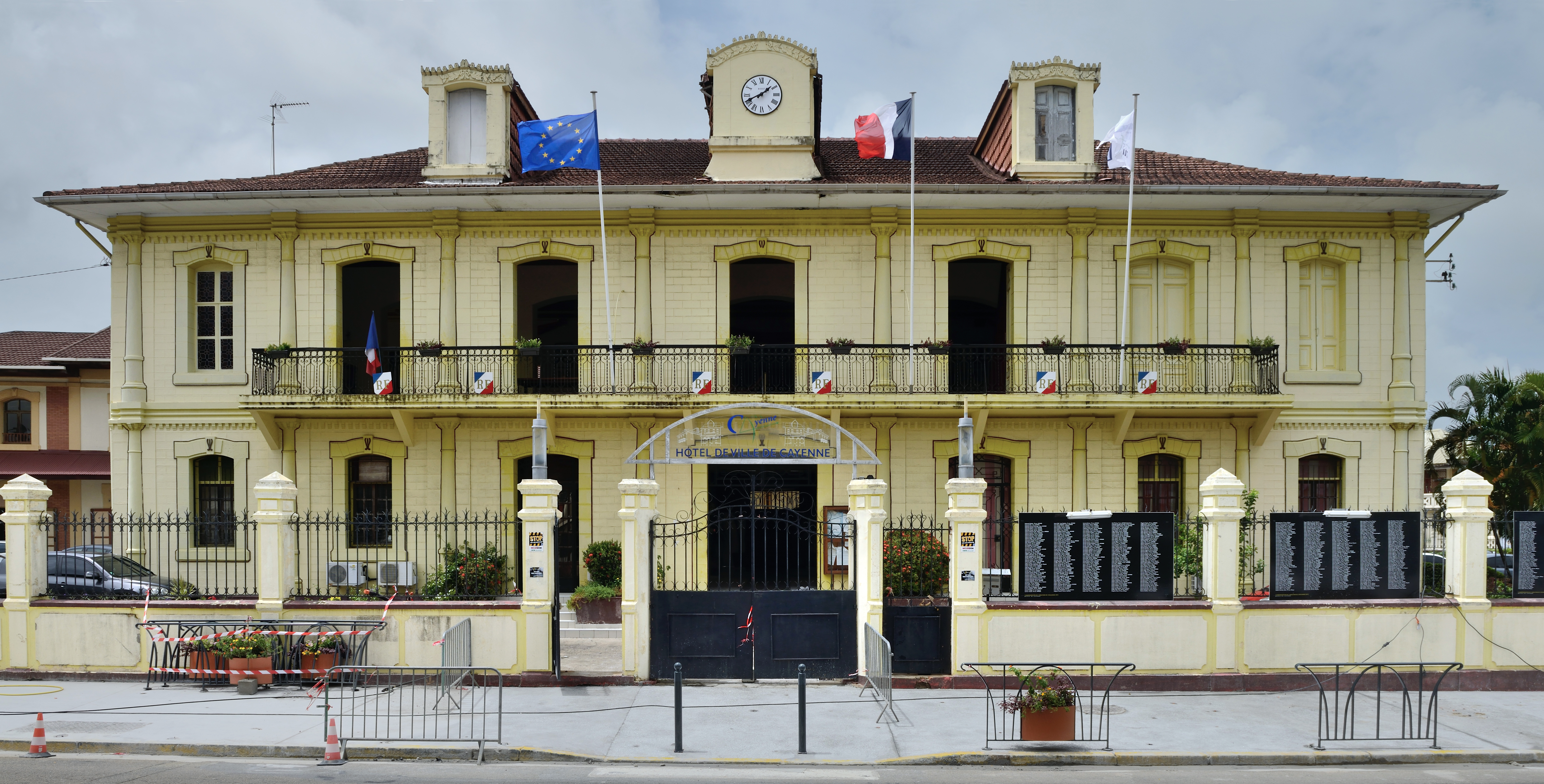
Cayenne City Hall

The president of France appoints a prefect (resident at the prefecture building in Cayenne) as his representative to head the local government of French Guiana. There is one elected, local executive body, the Assemblée de Guyane.

French Guiana sends two deputies to the French National Assembly, one representing the commune (municipality) of Cayenne and the commune of Macouria, and the other representing the rest of French Guiana. This latter constituency is the largest in the French Republic by land area. French Guiana also sends two senators to the French Senate. The first woman to be elected to the Senate was Marie-Laure Phinéra-Horth in 2020.

The Guianese Socialist Party dominated politics in French Guiana until 2010.

A chronic issue affecting French Guiana is the influx of illegal immigrants and clandestine gold prospectors from Brazil and Suriname. The border between the department and Suriname, the Maroni River, flows through rain forest and is difficult for the Gendarmerie and the French Foreign Legion to patrol. There have been several phases launched by the French government to combat illegal gold mining in French Guiana, beginning with Operation Anaconda beginning in 2003, followed by Operation Harpie in 2008 and 2009 and Operation Harpie Reinforce in 2010. Colonel François Müller, the commander of French Guiana's gendarmes, believes these operations have been successful. However, after each operation ends, Brazilian miners, garimpeiros, return. Soon after Operation Harpie Reinforce began, an altercation took place between French authorities and Brazilian miners. On 12 March 2010 a team of French soldiers and border police were attacked while returning from a successful operation, during which "the soldiers had arrested 15 miners, confiscated three boats, and seized 617 grams of gold... currently worth about $22,317". Garimpeiros returned to retrieve their lost loot and colleagues. The soldiers fired warning shots and rubber "flash balls", but the miners managed to retake one of their boats and about 500 grams of gold. "The violent reaction by the garimpeiros can be explained by the exceptional take of 617 grams of gold, about 20 percent of the quantity seized in 2009 during the battle against illegal mining", said Phillipe Duporge, the director of French Guiana's border police, at a press conference the next day.

=== Administrative divisions ===
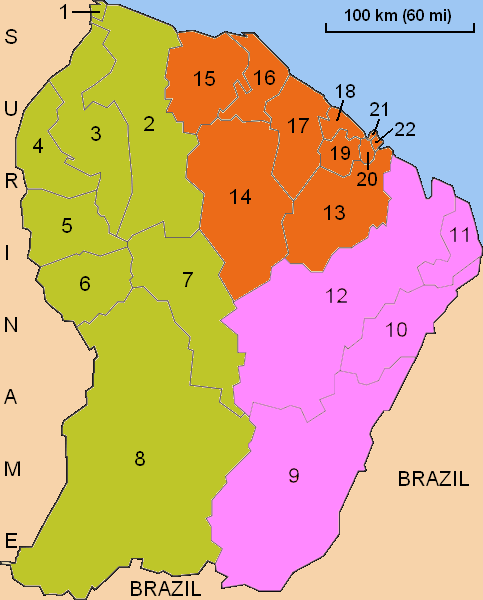
Labeled map

French Guiana is divided into 3 arrondissements and 22 communes:

About a tenth of the Maripasoula commune is claimed by Suriname. A bilateral commission has been set up to resolve the dispute. Suriname contends that the boundary follows the Marowini River to the east, while France asserts that the border follows the Litani River and Coulé-Coulé Creek to the west.

Number	Name	Area (km^{2})	Population (2019)	Individual Map	Arrondissement
1	Awala-Yalimapo	187.4	1,449		Saint-Laurent-du-Maroni
2	Mana	6,333	11,675		Saint-Laurent-du-Maroni
3	Saint-Laurent-du-Maroni	4,830	47,621		Saint-Laurent-du-Maroni
4	Apatou	2,020	9,482		Saint-Laurent-du-Maroni
5	Grand-Santi	2,112	8,779		Saint-Laurent-du-Maroni
6	Papaïchton	2,628	5,757		Saint-Laurent-du-Maroni
7	Saül	4,475	152		Saint-Laurent-du-Maroni
8	Maripasoula	18,360	11,842		Saint-Laurent-du-Maroni
9	Camopi	10,030	1,864		Saint-Georges
10	Saint-Georges	2,320	4,245		Saint-Georges
11	Ouanary	1,080	242		Saint-Georges
12	Régina	12,130	854		Saint-Georges
13	Roura	3,902.5	3,458		Cayenne
14	Saint-Élie	5,680	247		Cayenne
15	Iracoubo	2,762	1,748		Cayenne
16	Sinnamary	1,340	2,875		Cayenne
17	Kourou	2,160	24,903		Cayenne
18	Macouria	377.5	16,219		Cayenne
19	Montsinéry-Tonnegrande	634	2,957		Cayenne
20	Matoury	137.19	33,458		Cayenne
21	Cayenne	23.6	65,493		Cayenne
22	Remire-Montjoly	46.11	26,358		Cayenne

=== Military ===
==== French Armed Forces ====
French military forces in Guiana number around 2,000 personnel and include the following:

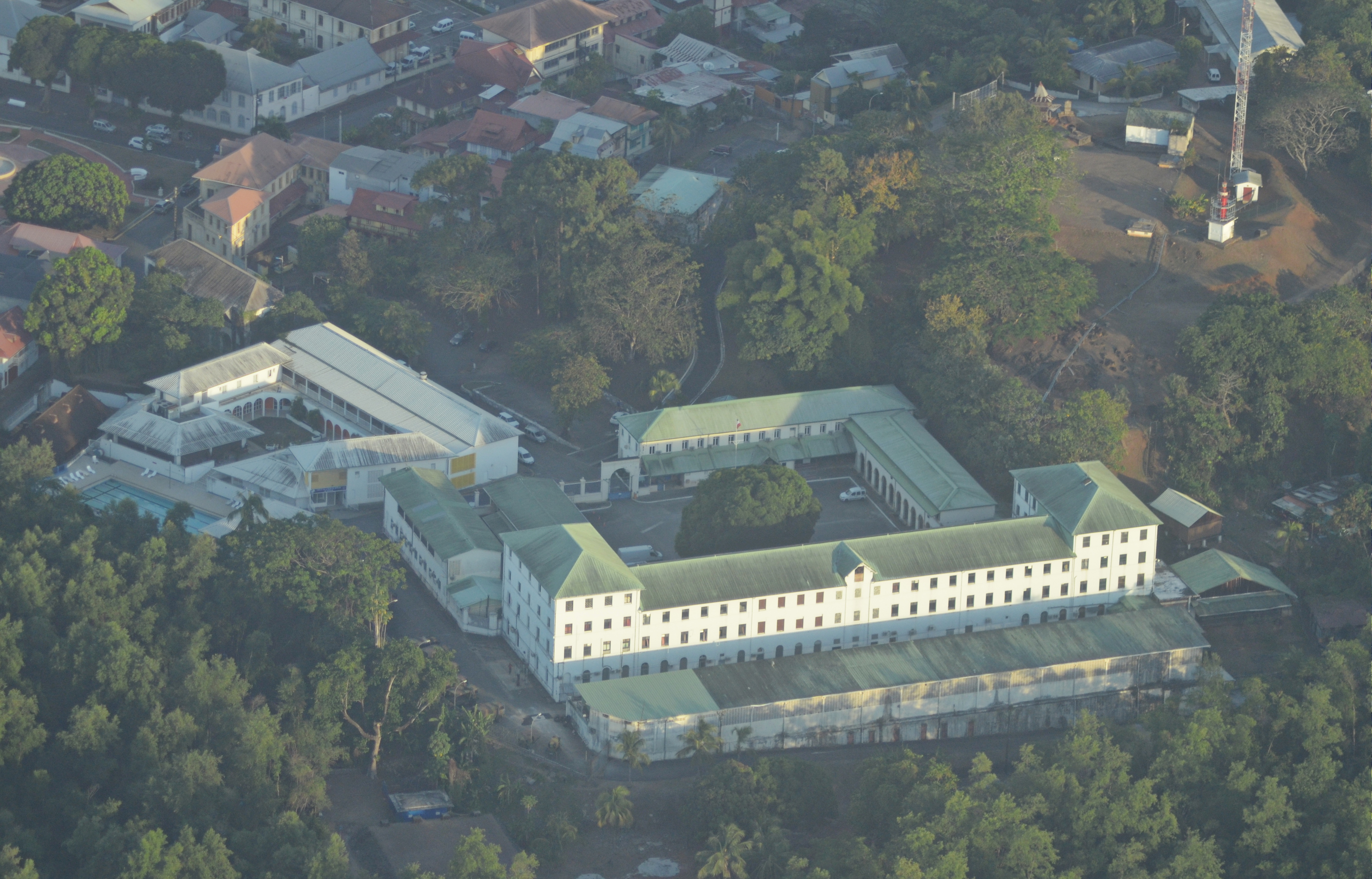
Headquarters of the 9th Marine Infantry Regiment (9e RIMa) in Cayenne

- The 9th Marine Infantry Regiment (9^{e} RIMa) in Cayenne, the Madeleine.
- The 3rd Foreign Infantry Regiment (3^{e} REI) in Kourou.
- The RSMAG Regiment (Adapted Military Service) of French Guiana, located in Saint-Jean-du-Maroni, with a detachment in Cayenne.
- Various detachments:
  - 68 Air Transport Squadron, which includes: five Puma helicopters, four Fennec helicopters and three Casa CN235 aircraft
  - A platoon of the French Navy, based at the naval base of Dégrad des Cannes and operating two Confiance-class patrol vessels: La Confiance and La Résolue, as well as one Net Retrieval Boat (ERF – La Caouanne). One EDA-S landing craft (Anne-Marie II) is also deployed in the territory. The landing craft supports coastal and riverine operations in the territory.
  - A detachment of the Paris Fire Brigade in Kourou, ensuring the protection of the Guiana Space Centre.

=== Police and security forces ===
==== Gendarmerie and National Police ====
- Elements of the National Gendarmerie (some 840 personnel) and the national police are deployed in French Guiana and are divided into 16 "brigades". These serve Cayenne, Remire-Montjoly, Cacao, Régina, Saint-Georges-de-l'Oyapock, Camopi, Macouria, Kourou, Sinnamary, Iracoubo, Mana, Saint-Laurent-du-Maroni, Apatou, Grand-Santi, Papaïchton, Maripasoula and Matoury. The National Gendarmerie include five mobile gendarmerie squadrons.
  - The Maritime Gendarmerie operates the patrol boats Charente and Organabo in the territory, Charente having been deployed to the territory in 2022 to replace the previous boat Mahury, which was no longer deemed serviceable.

== Economy ==
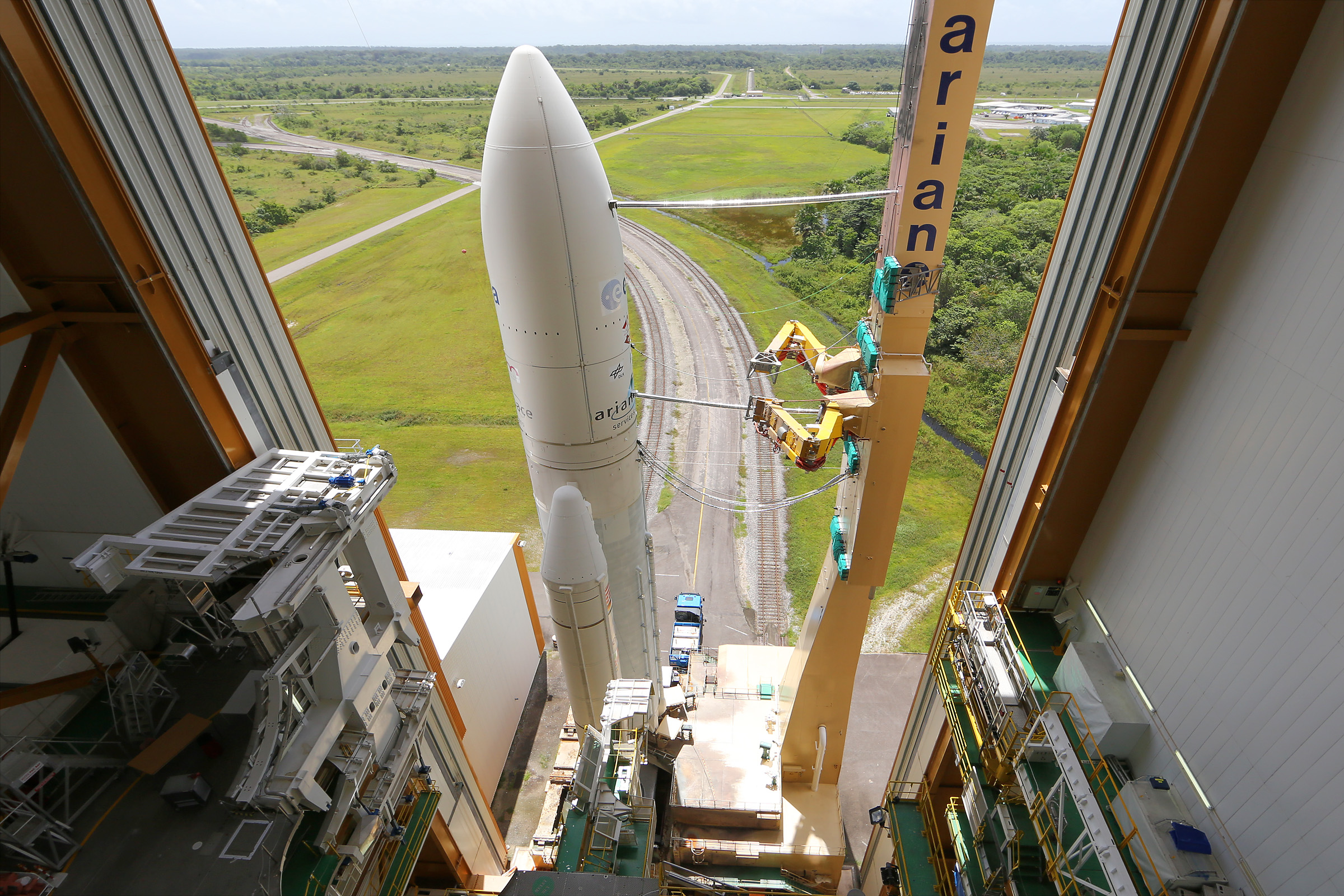
An Ariane 5 rocket being processed at the Guiana Space Centre; the launch site is estimated to account for as much as 16% of French Guiana's GDP

As a part of France, French Guiana is part of the European Union and the Eurozone; its currency is the euro. The country code top-level domain (ccTLD) for French Guiana is .gf, but .fr is generally used instead.

In 2019, the GDP of French Guiana at market exchange rates was US$4.93 billion (€4.41 billion), ranking as the 2nd largest economy in the Guianas after Guyana (which discovered large oil fields in 2015 and 2018), and the 12th largest in South America.

From the 1960s to the 2000s, French Guiana experienced strong economic growth, fueled by the development of France's Guiana Space Centre (established in French Guiana in 1964 as the independence of Algeria in 1962 led to the closure of France's space center in the Algerian Sahara) and by high population growth that stimulated domestic consumption. French Guiana's economy did not suffer from the 2008 financial crisis: the GDP grew by an average of +3.4% per year in real terms from 2002 to 2012, slightly faster than the rapidly growing population, which allowed French Guiana to catch up marginally with the rest of France in terms of standards of living. The GDP per capita rose from 48.0% of metropolitan France's level in 2000 to 48.5% of metropolitan France in 2012.

Since 2013, however, French Guiana's economic growth has been uneven, and more subdued. From 2013 to 2019, the economy grew by an average of only +1.2% per year in real terms. French Guiana experienced a recession of −0.8% in 2014, and social unrest in 2017 led to almost no economic growth that year. Economic growth recovered at +3.0% in 2018, but was again almost null (+0.2%) in 2019. As a result, the GDP per capita has remained stagnant in nominal terms since 2013, and has declined relative to metropolitan France's. In 2019, the GDP per capita of French Guiana at market exchange rates, not at PPP, was US$17,375 (€15,521), only 42.3% of metropolitan France's average GDP per capita that year, and 50.3% of the metropolitan French regions outside the Paris Region.

French Guiana was affected by the COVID-19 pandemic in 2020, leading to a recession of −2.7% that year according to provisional estimates, moderate compared to the COVID-19 recession in metropolitan France (−7.9% in 2020).

Regional GDP of French Guiana (in euros, current prices)
	2000	2006	2012	2013	2014	2015	2016	2017	2018	2019	2020	2021
Nominal GDP (€ bn)	1.95	2.91	3.91	4.00	3.96	4.00	4.12	3.98	3.92	3.93	3.84	3.97
GDP per capita (euros)	11,814	13,874	15,638	15,534	15,480	15,091	15,356	15,151	15,607	15,633	15,367	15,611
GDP per capita as a % of Metropolitan France's	48.0%	47.1%	48.5%	47.8%	47.8%	45.7%	45.9%	44.1%	44.4%	43.2%	45.0%	42.3%
Sources: INSEE.

French Guiana is heavily dependent on mainland France for subsidies, trade, and goods. The main traditional industries are fishing (accounting for 5% of exports in 2012), gold mining (accounting for 32% of exports in 2012) and timber (accounting for 1% of exports in 2012). In addition, the Guiana Space Centre has played a significant role in the local economy since it was established in Kourou in 1964: it accounted directly and indirectly for 16% of French Guiana's GDP in 2002 (down from 26% in 1994, as the French Guianese economy is becoming increasingly diversified). The Guiana Space Centre employed 1,659 people in 2012.

There is very little manufacturing. Agriculture is largely undeveloped and is mainly confined to the area near the coast and along the Maroni River. Sugar and bananas were traditionally two of the main cash crops grown for export but have almost completely disappeared. Today they have been replaced by livestock raising (essentially beef cattle and pigs) in the coastal savannas between Cayenne and the second-largest town, Saint-Laurent-du-Maroni, and market gardening (fruits and vegetables) developed by the Hmong communities settled in French Guiana in the 1970s, both destined to the local market. A thriving rice production, developed on polders near Mana from the early 1980s to the late 2000s, has almost completely disappeared since 2011 due to marine erosion and new EU plant health rules that forbid the use of many pesticides and fertilizers. Tourism, especially eco-tourism, is growing.

Unemployment has been persistently high in the last few decades, standing between 17% and 24%. In recent years, the unemployment rate has declined from a peak of 23.0% in 2016 to 19.3% in 2019.

=== Transport ===
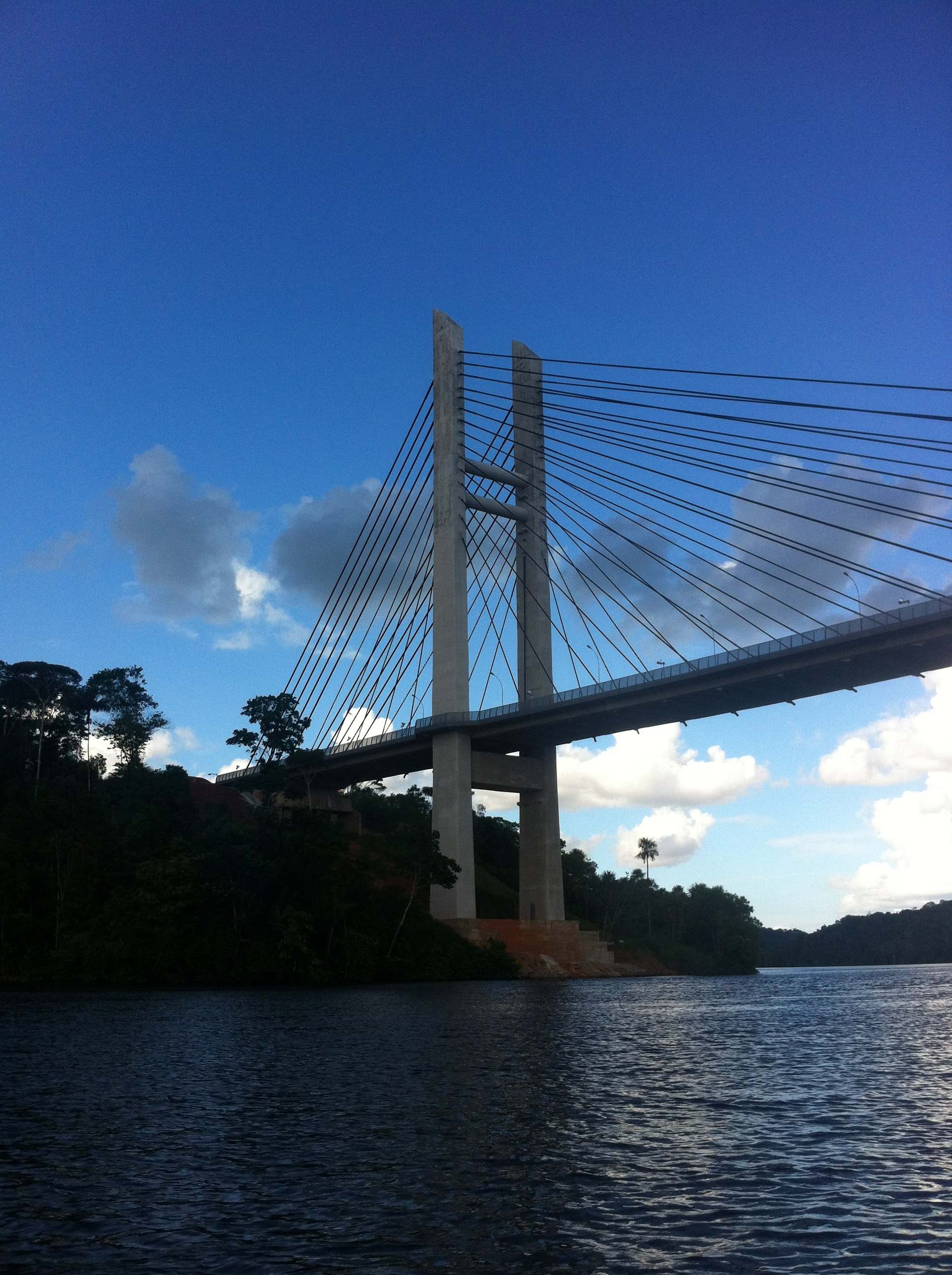
Oyapock River Bridge

The transportation system in French Guiana is deficient compared to Metropolitan France, being concentrated in the coastal zone of the territory, while the inland municipalities are poorly connected and often difficult to access.

==== Road system ====
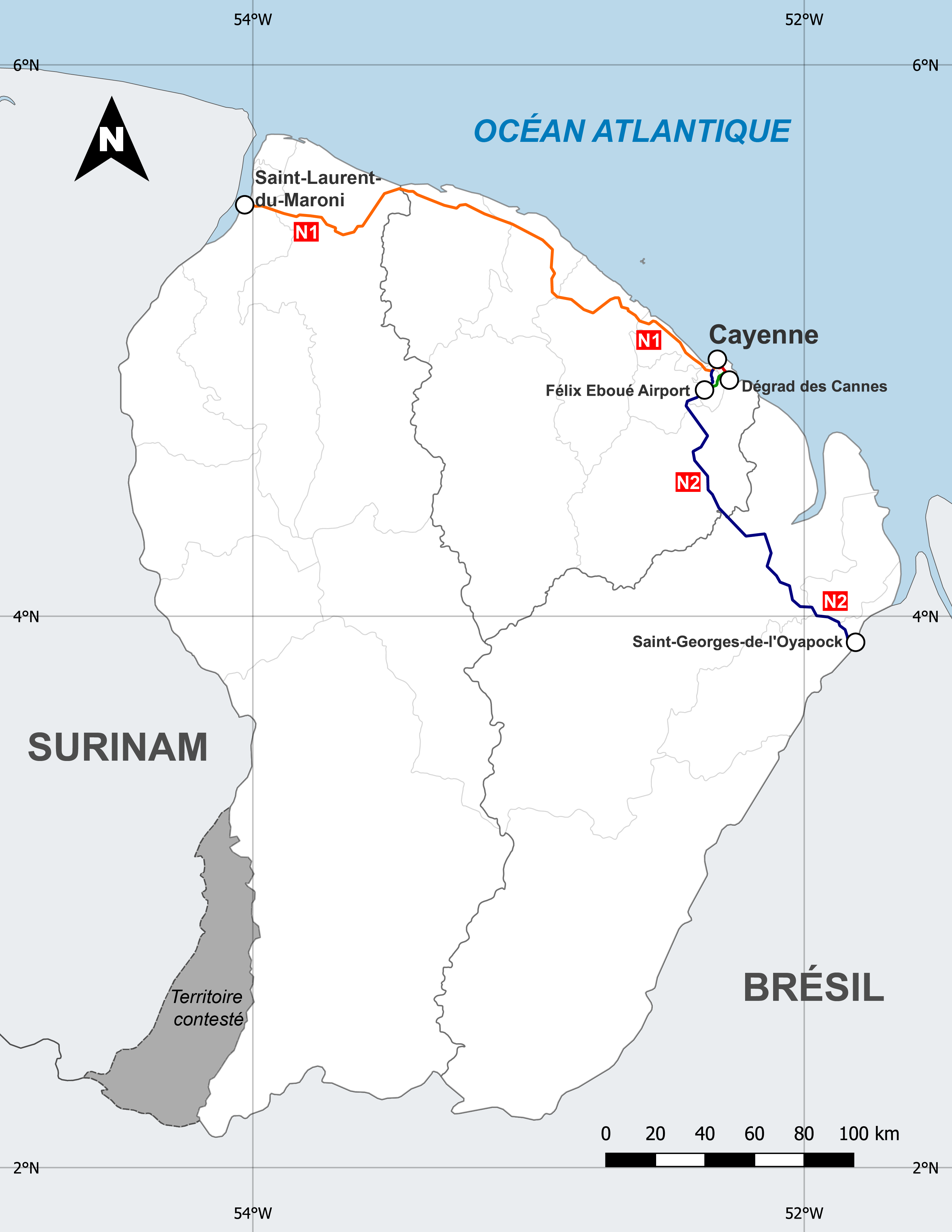
French Guiana Roads N1 and N2

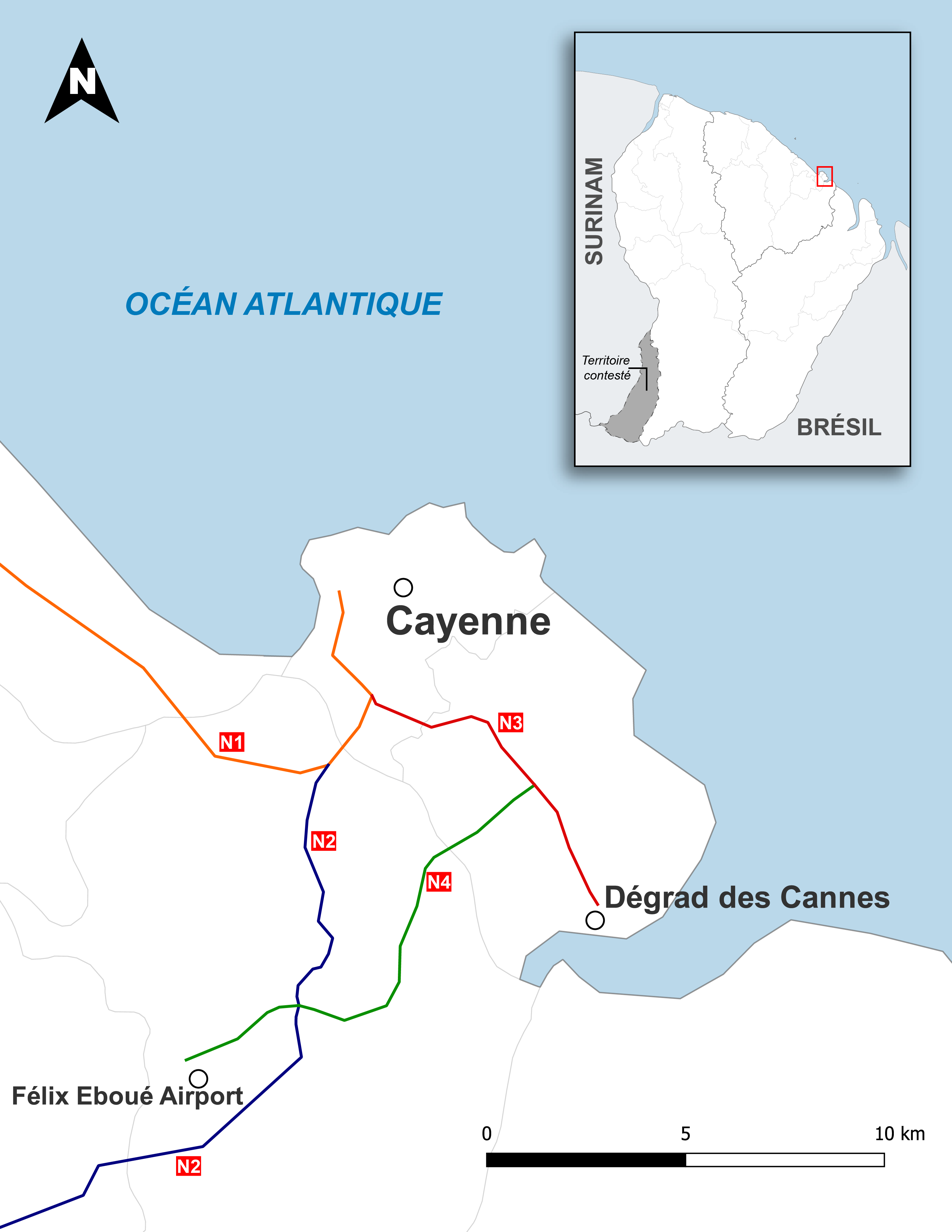
Roads N1, N2, N3 and N4 around Cayenne

French Guiana has about 2,200 km of roads, which are divided into:

- National roads (440 km), divided into N1, N2, N3 and N4 (the last two downgraded to departmental roads during Raffarin's tenure), which connect the main coastal towns, forming a corridor that crosses the coastal strip from the border with Suriname to that of Brazil: N1, completed in the 1990s, links Cayenne to Saint-Laurent-du-Maroni, crossing the municipalities of Macouria, Kourou, Sinnamary (the stretch of road between Kourou and Sinnamary is locally called Route de l'espace, "Space Road") and Iracoubo. N2 runs between Cayenne and Saint-Georges-de-l'Oyapock, where it continues on BR-156 across the bridge over the Oyapock. Today, all rivers are crossed by road bridges, some of them quite long (e.g. the bridge over the Cayenne River is 1225 m long), whereas until 2004 (the year of completion and inauguration of the Approuague bridge) some rivers were still crossed by barges. Transport on national roads is restricted during the rainy season (from 48 to a maximum of 32 tons), while the maximum speed (monitored by the National Gendarmerie posts at Régina and Iracoubo, which are also in charge of controlling the possible flow of illegal traffic and irregular immigrants) is 90 km/h;
- Departmental roads (408 km), subdivided into urban and rural departmental roads (rural roads), which serve the coastal Villages, 90% of which have no street lighting;
- Communal roads or forest tracks (1311 km), most of which are closed to ordinary traffic and reserved for authorized personnel (employees of authorized mining or logging companies, forest rangers): the longest tracks are the Bélizon track in the commune of Saül (Guiana) (150 km), the Saint-Élie-diga track in Petit-Saut (26 km), the Coralie track (the oldest in the department, created to reach the Boulanger mine) and the Maripasoula-Papaïchton track. The communal roads are not usually paved and often go into the forest from the departmental roads.

Despite the existence of numerous projects to upgrade and asphalt roads (such as the Bélizon road or the Apatou-Maripasoula-Saül axis), which are often opposed by environmental movements because of environmental fragmentation and problems for Amerindian and Maroon communities, several French Guiana municipalities (Ouanary, Camopi, Saül, Saint-Élie, Grand-Santi, Papaïchton, Maripasoula, Apatou) still do not have road access.

Following a treaty between France and Brazil signed in July 2005, the Oyapock River Bridge over the Oyapock River was built and completed in 2011, becoming the first land crossing ever between French Guiana and the rest of the world (there exists no other bridge crossing the Oyapock River, and no bridge crossing the Maroni River marking the border with Suriname, although there is a ferry crossing to Albina, Suriname). The bridge was officially opened on 18 March 2017, however the border post construction on the Brazilian side caused additional delays. As of 2020, it possible to drive uninterrupted from Cayenne to Macapá (on the Amazon River), the capital of the state of Amapá in Brazil.

==== Railway system ====
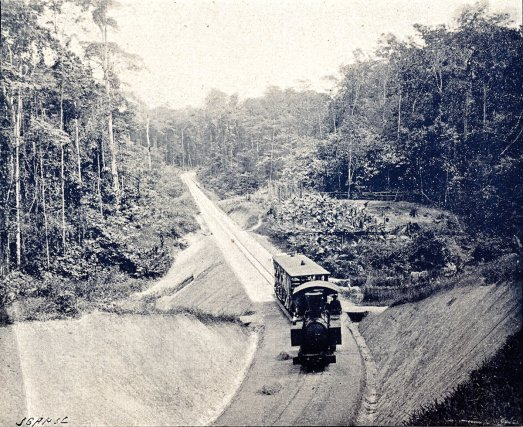
The railway section of the Tiger Camp. Saint-Laurent to Saint-Jean-du-Maroni Railway (Prison Administration c. 1905).

French Guiana does not have a railway system, with the exception of a small section in the Centre Spatial Guyanais used for the transport of components: when the territory was a penal colony, there were some railroad lines built by the prisoners themselves to connect the various baths with each other, the remains of which (now disused and mostly engulfed by the jungle) are still visible in some areas. These lines include the section from Montsinéry-Tonnegrande to the so-called bagne des Annamites, the section from Saint-Élie to the Saut du Tigre labor camp (now submerged by the artificial lake created by the Petit-Saut dam) and the section from Saint-Laurent-du-Maroni-Mana-Saint-Jean-du-Maroni.

==== Ports ====
Transportation by boat is quite widespread in French Guiana: among the most important Ports are the port of Dégrad-Des-Cannes, located at the mouth of the Mahury River, in the commune of Rémire-Montjoly, through which most of the imported or exported goods of the territory pass and where the local detachment of the Marine nationale is housed, and the port of Larivot, located in Matoury, where the Guyanese fishing fleet is concentrated.

The port of Dégrad-Des-Cannes, built in 1969 to cope with the impossibility of the former port of Cayenne to decongest the growing maritime traffic, has a rather limited draft, and larger ships often prefer to dock at Ile du Salut to unload people and goods (which are then transported to the mainland by smaller ships) to avoid running aground. The port of Pariacabo in Kourou is home to the Colibri and Toucan ships, which carry components for Ariane missiles.

The inland rivers are heavily traversed by canoes and other small boats, linking the villages on the Marowijne, Oyapock and Approuague Rivers, which often cannot be reached in any other way; the lake created by the Petit-Saut dam is also frequently crossed, although it is officially forbidden to cross the body of water.

In the department, 460 km of aquatic environment are considered navigable.

==== Airports ====
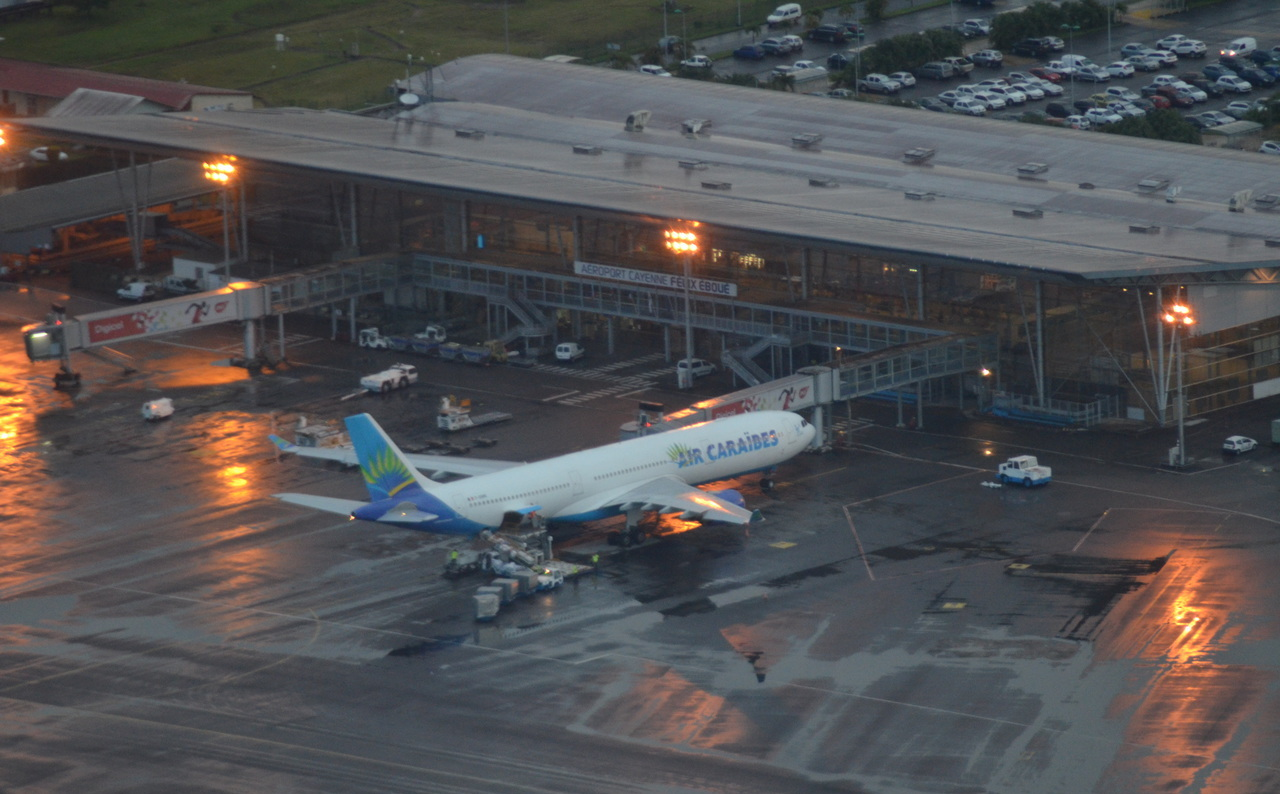
Cayenne Airport

French Guiana is served by Cayenne – Félix Eboué Airport, located in Matoury. There are also several airstrips in the department, located in Camopi, Maripasoula, Ouanary, Saint-Georges-de-l'Oyapock, Saint-Laurent-du-Maroni and Saül, for a total of eleven hubs (four paved and seven unpaved).

From the main airport, there are two daily direct flights to Paris offered by Air France and Air Caraïbes, as well as other flights to Fort-de-France (Martinique), Pointe-à-Pitre (Guadeloupe), Port-au-Prince (Haiti), Miami (United States), Belém (Brazil). The regional carrier Air Guyane Express also offers daily local flights to Maripasoula and Saül, as well as more sporadic flights (mainly related to postal deliveries) to Saint-Georges-de-l'Oyapock and Camopi.

==== Public transportation ====
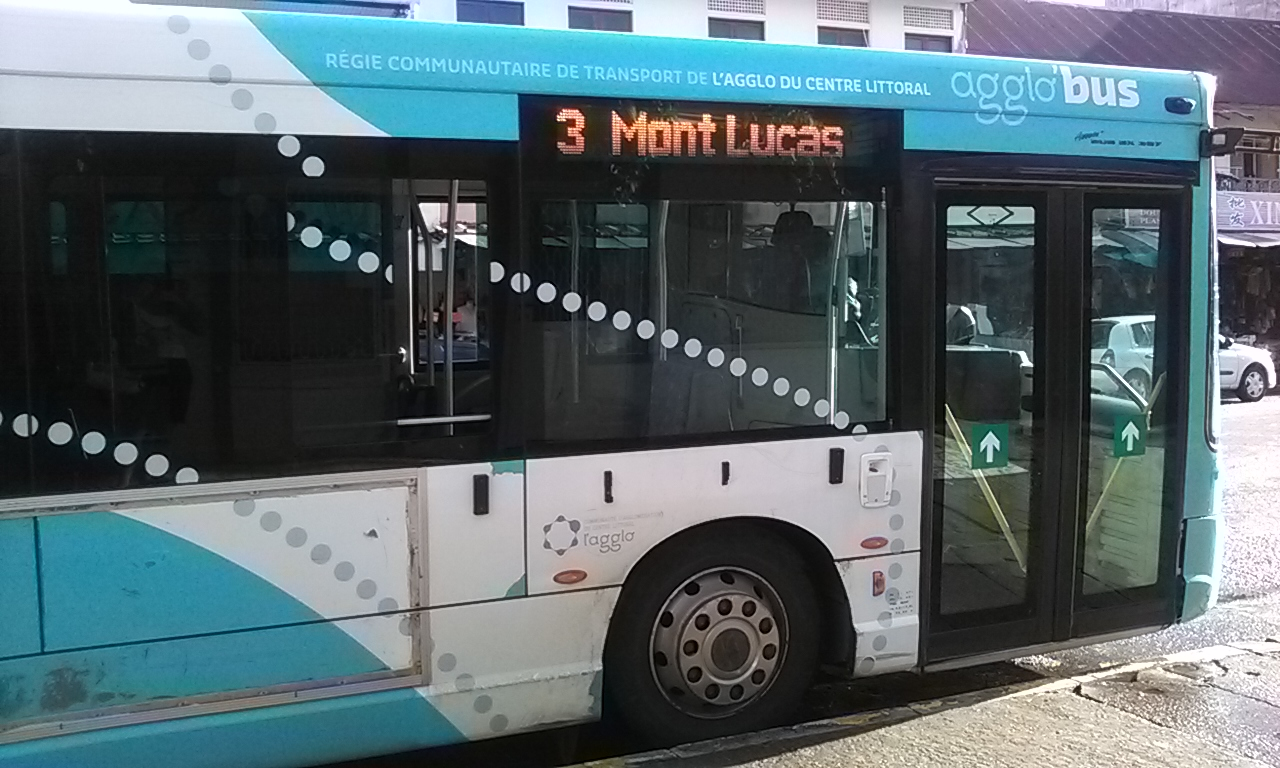
An Agglo bus, public transport, in the city of Cayenne, French Guiana

The public bus service consisting of seven lines covers the municipality of Cayenne and is run by the RCT (Régie Communautaire des Transports), formerly known as SMTC (Syndicat Mixte de Transport en Commun).

For connections between the coastal towns (except Montsinéry-Tonnegrande), the "collective cab" (Taxis Co) method is quite widespread, which are minibuses with a capacity of about ten people that leave as soon as there is a certain number of users on board. In 2010, the general council reached an agreement with some of the operators of this service to make it at least partially public under the name of TIG (Transporte Interurbano de la Guiana), with fixed departure times and predefined stops.

On the main rivers (Marowijne and Oyapock), there are pirogue services (called pirogues cabs), which go both to inland centers and across the border (such as Albina in Suriname or Oiapoque in Brazil).

== Demographics ==
=== Historical population ===
French Guiana experienced a long period of demographic stagnation during the days of the Cayenne and Saint-Laurent-du-Maroni penal colonies (19th century and first half of the 20th century), when, with the exception of a brief gold rush in the 1900s and 1910s, it suffered from a bad reputation due to its association with penal colonies and bad sanitary conditions (yellow fever and malaria in particular).

Population started to grow tremendously from the 1950s onwards with the improvement of sanitary conditions (yellow fever and malaria eradication campaigns started in 1949) and the establishment of the Guiana Space Centre in 1964. Population growth has been fueled both by high birth rates and large arrivals of immigrants (from metropolitan France, to man the public administrations and the space center, as well as from neighboring countries, in particular Suriname and Brazil). Arrivals of Surinamese refugees reached record levels in the 1980s during the Surinamese Interior War, resulting in the highest population growth rate in French Guiana's history, recorded between the 1982 and 1990 censuses (+5.8% per year).

In the 21st century, the birth rate has remained high, and new arrivals of migrants seeking asylum (in particular from Haiti, and more recently from Syria and Afghanistan) kept population growth above 2% per year until the middle of the 2010s. Since the middle of the 2010s, however, population growth has slowed markedly, due to lower economic growth and social unrest, in particular the social unrest in 2017, which led to a recession in 2018, and then the effects of the COVID-19 recession, which have all pushed many young people to leave to Metropolitan France. In January 2026, INSEE estimate French Guiana's population reached 298,554, more than 10 times the population in 1954, but far short of the population forecasts that were published in the 2010s.

Half of French Guiana's 300,000 residents are under the age of 25, a result of both a high birth rate and significant emigration. A 2021 report by the French statistics agency Insee found that 37% of individuals aged 21 to 29 leave the region to pursue education or employment opportunities abroad. At the same time, around one-third of young people between 15 and 29 are not working or in school, especially in remote areas with poor road access.

The population of French Guiana, currently around 300,000 people, is projected to grow quickly due to a combination of the highest fertility rate in Latin America (27.3 births per 1,000 people and an average of 3.63 children per woman in 2019) and steady immigration, which offsets emigration.

Historical population

Year	Pop.	±% p.a.
1807	15,483	—
1814	14,463	−0.97%
1827	22,416	+3.43%
1832	22,531	+0.10%
1837	21,221	−1.19%
1842	20,365	−0.82%
1850	20,100	−0.16%
1855	20,198	+0.10%
1860	25,687	+4.93%
1868	25,151	−0.26%
1872	24,171	−0.99%
1876	27,082	+2.88%

Year	Pop.	±% p.a.
1880	27,333	+0.23%
1887	25,796	−0.82%
1891	29,650	+3.54%
1895	30,310	+0.55%
1901	32,908	+1.38%
1906	39,117	+3.52%
1911	48,810	+4.53%
1921	44,202	−0.99%
1936	36,975	−1.18%
1946	28,506	−2.57%
1954	27,863	−0.27%
1961	33,505	+2.57%

Year	Pop.	±% p.a.
1967	44,392	+4.79%
1974	55,125	+3.14%
1982	73,022	+3.88%
1990	114,678	+5.79%
1999	157,213	+3.58%
2007	213,031	+3.96%
2012	239,648	+2.38%
2017	268,700	+2.31%
2023	293,996	+1.51%
2026	298,554	+0.51%

Local population estimates and censuses up to 1946. INSEE censuses between 1954 and 2023. Last INSEE 2026 estimate.

=== Major metropolitan areas and settlements ===
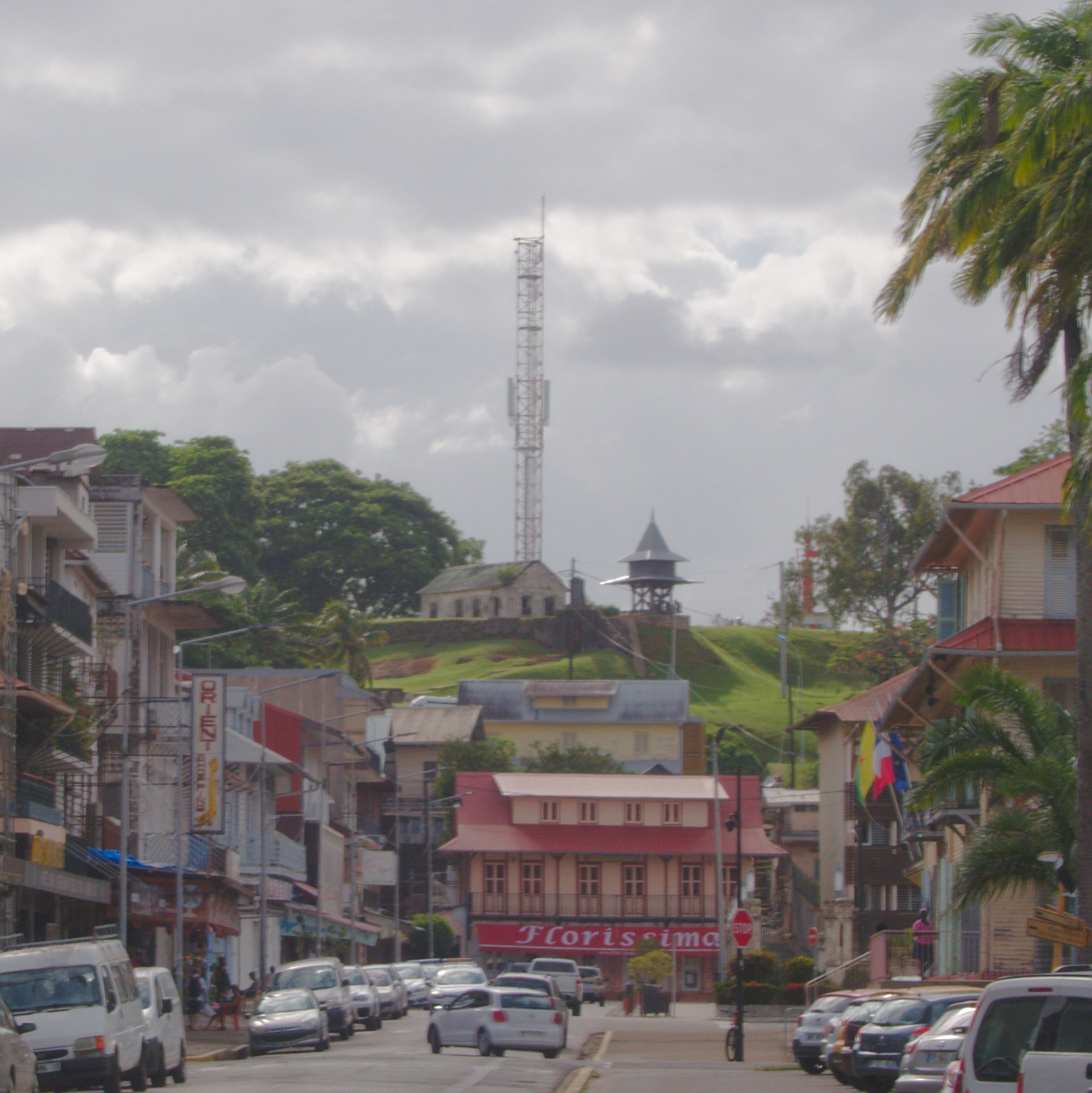
View of Fort Cépérou Mount, Cayenne

There are three metropolitan areas (as defined by INSEE) in French Guiana. These are Cayenne, which covers 6 communes (Cayenne, Remire-Montjoly, Matoury, Macouria, Montsinéry-Tonnegrande, and Roura), Saint-Laurent-du-Maroni, made up of the namesake commune, and Kourou, which covers 2 communes (Kourou and Sinnamary).

The population of these three metropolitan areas at the 2023 census was the following:

Metropolitan area	Population (2023)
Cayenne	153,884
Saint-Laurent-du-Maroni	54,429
Kourou	27,580

Beyond these three metropolitan areas, the most populated communes (municipalities), which are not populated enough to form a metropolitan area, were the following at the 2023 census:

Commune	Population (2023)
Mana	10,957
Apatou	10,306
Grand-Santi	9,668
Maripasoula	9,579
Papaichton	5,006
Saint-Georges	4,915

=== Ethnic groups ===
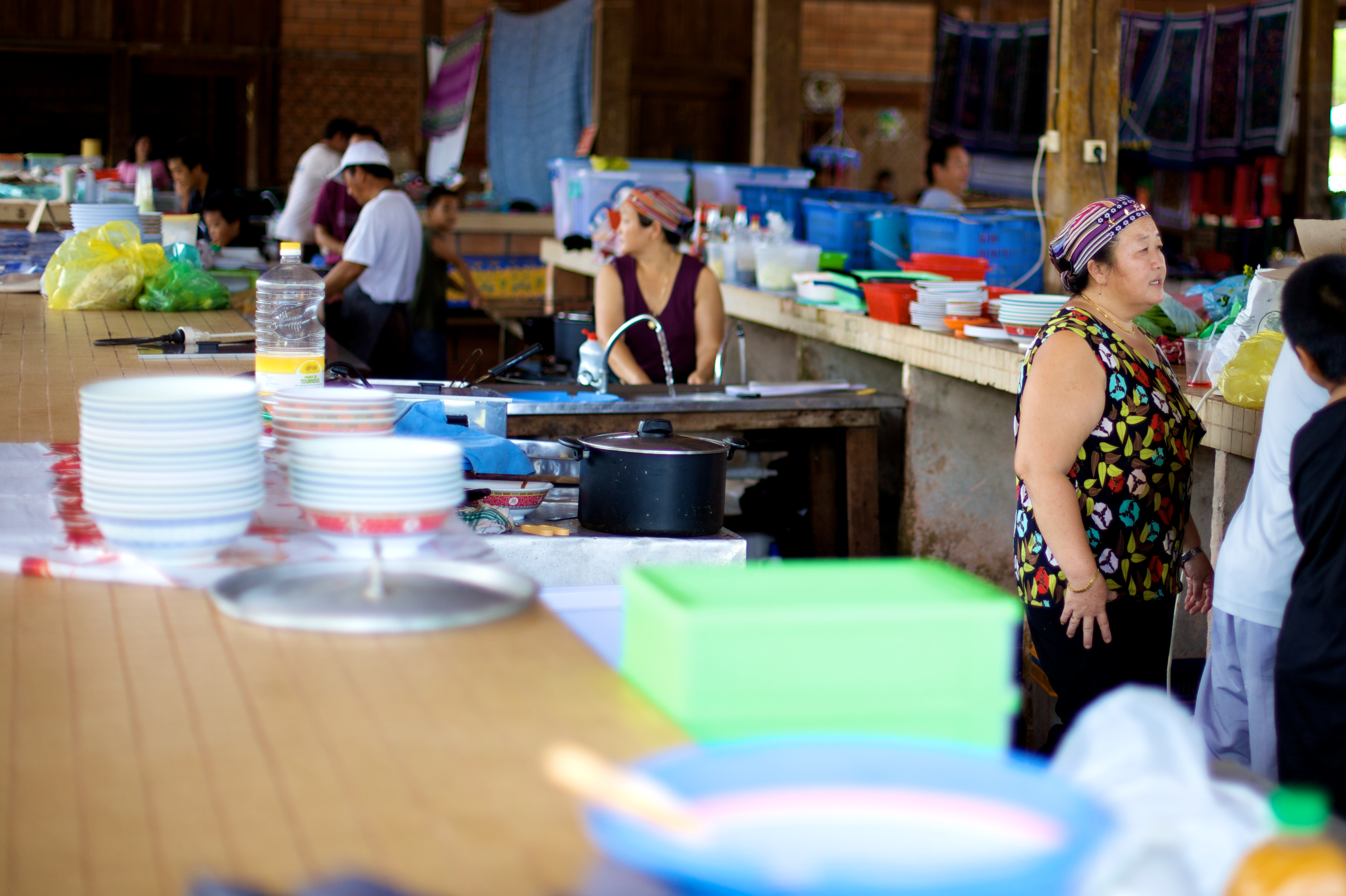
Fresh market of Hmong in Cacao village

French Guiana's population, most of whom live along the coast, is substantially ethnically diverse. At the 2023 census, 56.4% of the inhabitants of French Guiana were born in French Guiana, 7.9% were born in Metropolitan France, 2.6% were born in the French Caribbean departments and collectivities (Guadeloupe and Martinique etc.), and 32.8% were born in foreign countries (primarily Suriname, Brazil, and Haiti).

Estimates of the percentages of French Guiana ethnic composition are difficult to produce due to the presence of a large proportion of immigrants. People of African descent are the largest ethnic group, though estimates vary as to the exact percentage, depending upon whether the large Haitian community is included as well. Generally, the Creole population is judged to be about 60–70% of the total population if Haitians (comprising roughly one-third of Creoles) are included, and 30–50% otherwise. There are also smaller groups from various Caribbean islands, mainly Martinique, Guadeloupe, and Saint Lucia.

Approximately 53,900 people or 18.2% of the population is of European ancestry. The vast majority of these are of French ancestry, though there are also people of Spanish and Portuguese ancestry.

The main Asian communities are the Chinese (about 3–4%, primarily from Zhejiang and Guangdong in mainland China) and Hmong from Laos (1–2%). Other groups from Asia include Indians, Lebanese and Vietnamese.

The main groups living in the interior are the Maroons, who are of African and indigenous descent. The Maroons, descendants of escaped African slaves, live primarily along the Maroni River. The main Maroon groups are the Saramaca, Aukan (both of which also live in Suriname), and Boni (Aluku).

The main indigenous groups (forming about 3–4% of the population) are the Lokono, Teko (formerly known as the Emerillon), Kaliña (formerly known as the Galibi), Palikur, Wayampi and Wayana. As of the late 1990s, there was evidence of an uncontacted group of Wayampi.

=== Immigration ===
Place of birth of residents of French Guiana (at the 1990, 1999, 2008, 2013, 2019, and 2022 censuses)
Census	Born in French Guiana	Born in Metropolitan France	Born in the French West Indies	Born in the rest of Overseas France	Born in foreign countries with French citizenship at birth¹	Immigrants²
2023	56.4%	7.9%	2.6%	0.2%	1.3%	31.5%
2019	56.5%	8.9%	2.8%	0.3%	1.0%	30.5%
2013	57.0%	9.4%	2.9%	0.3%	1.2%	29.2%
2008	55.4%	9.6%	3.0%	0.2%	1.3%	30.5%
1999	54.4%	11.8%	4.9%	0.3%	2.0%	26.6%
1990	50.5%	11.7%	5.2%	0.3%	1.9%	30.4%
¹Persons born abroad of French parents, such as Pieds-Noirs and children of French expatriates. ²An immigrant is by French definition a person born in a foreign country and who did not have French citizenship at birth. Note that an immigrant may have acquired French citizenship since moving to France, but is still listed as an immigrant in French statistics. On the other hand, persons born in France with foreign citizenship (the children of immigrants) are not listed as immigrants.
Source: INSEE

More than one third of the population and nearly half adults are of foreign origin. Seven of ten people born in French Guiana were within one or two generations descendants of immigrants. About 12% of French Guiana’s population are French nationals from mainland France. Foreign nationals make up 37% of the population, half of whom are adults, well above national averages. Surinamese are the largest foreign group (1 in 8 people), followed by Haitians (9.3%) and Brazilians (9.2%). Other immigrant groups include people from Guyana (6%), Saint Lucia (3%), China (3%), and Laos (2%). A significant portion of these communities are undocumented: 52% of Brazilians, 49% of Surinamese, and 23% of Haitians, with 15–18% of the total population lacking legal status.

Immigration has shaped French Guiana since 1634, with the slave trade, penal colony, and gold rush drawing people from the Caribbean, China, and Lebanon. The 1902 Montagne Pelée eruption brought migrants from Martinique. The creation of the Guiana Space Center in Kourou further accelerated immigration, especially from Brazil. Surinamese migration surged during the 1982–1990 civil war, while Haitian arrivals grew during the Duvalier regime and increased through family reunification in the 1990s. In 1977, Hmong refugees from Laos arrived to support agricultural development.

Until the mid-2000s, most immigrants were from Suriname, Brazil, and Haiti. Today, origins are more diverse, including Spanish-speaking countries (e.g., Colombia, Venezuela, Peru, Cuba, and the Dominican Republic) and the Middle East (notably Syrians and Palestinians). This shift has led to rising numbers of undocumented immigrants eligible for state medical aid (AME), which rose from 17,000 in 2015 to over 33,000 in 2019.

Country of birth	Population	Source
Brazil	92,493 (official data in 2023 source)	Gov.br
Metropolitan France	24,000 (data of 2020 source)	Ulaval.ca
Surinam	19,000 − 32,000	
Haiti	24,000 − 28,000	
Dominican Republic	20,000 (official data in source)	la1ere.fr
Venezuela	19,000	
Peru	2,500 (official data in 2023 source)	Gob.pe
Colombia	2,500	

Between 2005 and 2014, 7,934 asylum seekers (excluding minors) were recorded. Applications surged after, reaching 2,765 in 2020, mostly from Haitians (63.6%), followed by Syrians/Palestinians (16.9%), Cubans (9.9%), and Dominicans (3.8%). However, over 95% of these requests, primarily from Haitians, were rejected. For some, French Guiana's status as French territory makes it a "gateway" to Europe. Many live in crowded refugee camps with poor conditions and little protection from the elements. Neither local authorities nor the French government have made significant efforts to help the situation.

=== Languages ===
The official language of French Guiana is French, and it is the predominant language of the department, spoken by most residents as a first or second language. Regional languages include French Guianese Creole (not to be confused with Guyanese Creole), six Amerindian languages (Lokono, Palijur, Kali'na, Wayana, Wayampi, Emerillon), four Maroon creole languages (Saramaka, Paramaccan, Aluku, Ndyuka), as well as Hmong Njua.

Guianese Creole (Kreol Gwiyanè), a French-based creole, is spoken by about 50,000 people in French Guiana in 2006 and 3,000 in Brazil, where it is known as Patwua, Crioulo, or Caripuna. It serves as a lingua franca for diverse communities, including Amerindians, Maroons, Chinese, Brazilians, and Haitians, especially in coastal and Lower Oyapock regions. Dialects vary slightly between the western (Saint-Laurent) and eastern areas. However, in western French Guiana, Maroon languages like Sranan Tongo have become more dominant.

Maroon languages are spoken mainly along the French Guiana–Suriname border. On the coast, there are about 29,800 Maroon language speakers, with 7,400 more inland.

- Aluku (Boni): 5,900 speakers, mainly along the Middle Maroni River and in cities like Cayenne and Kourou.
- Paramaccan (Pamaka): 2,800 speakers in both French Guiana and Suriname, living near the Maroni River.
- Ndyuka (Aukan, Okanisi): 14,000 speakers in French Guiana, 32,000 in Suriname; spoken by multiple Maroon groups.
- Saramaccan (Samaka): The most distinct Maroon language, with strong Portuguese influence; 14,500 speakers in French Guiana and 32,000 in Suriname.

Amerindian Languages:

- Lokono: ~600 speakers
- Palikur: ~1,100 speakers
- Cariban family: 30 Apalai, 2,700 Kali'na, and 800 Wayana speakers
- Tupi-Guarani family: 400 Emerillon (Teko) and 1,270 Wayampi speakers, mostly in Trois Sauts and Camopi.

A significant portion of French Guiana’s population speaks French-based Creole languages. In 2006, around 7,000 Antillean Creole speakers, originally from Guadeloupe and Martinique, reside in coastal regions near major cities. This Creole variety boasts a rich literary tradition, with works in both Guadeloupean and Martinican Creole. Additionally, approximately 30,000 Haitians in 2006, primarily living in Cayenne’s neighborhoods, speak Haitian Creole.

In 2006, Portuguese was spoken by around 15,000 Brazilians in French Guiana, though estimates suggest the number of speakers could be as high as 30,000. Since 2002, Spanish has become more common due to a growing population of South American immigrants, particularly from Peru and the Dominican Republic. Among Asian languages, in 2006 numbers, Chinese is spoken by approximately 3,000 people in French Guiana and 6,000 in Suriname. This community, originally from southeastern and eastern China, settled in both urban and rural areas during the late 19th and early 20th centuries. Lao is spoken by about 150 to 200 individuals, mainly in the commune of Roura and in Kourou. The Hmong community, originally from Laos, also uses the Lao language. Other Asian languages spoken in the region include Javanese and Vietnamese.

=== Religion ===
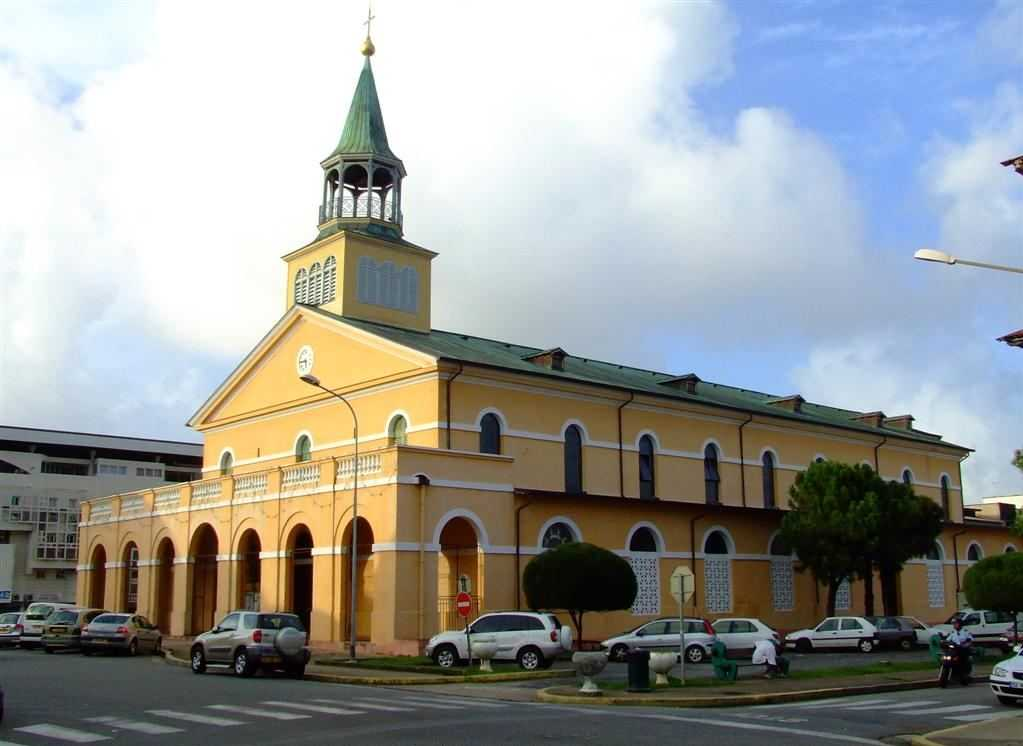
Cayenne Cathedral. Most inhabitants of French Guiana are Catholic.

The dominant religion of French Guiana is Catholicism; the Maroons and some Amerindian peoples maintain their own religions. The Hmong people are also largely Catholic owing to the influence of missionaries who helped bring them to French Guiana. French Guianan Catholics are part of the Diocese of Cayenne.

=== Health ===
French Guiana, as an overseas territory of France, benefits from a comprehensive and modern universal healthcare system, with the highest per capita health spending in Latin America (double that of Chile) despite having a much younger median age of 22.

Major Hospitals

- Andrée-Rosemon Hospital, Cayenne (full service hospital)

Regional Health Care

- Centre Hospitalier de Cayenne, Saint-Georges-de-l'Oyapock
- Centre Hospitalier de Kourou, Kourou
- Centre Hospitalier de l’Ouest Guyanais, Saint-Laurent du Maroni
- Private Hospital Saint-Paul, Cayenne

Remote interior villages, largely home to Maroon and Amerindian communities and only reachable by air or river, also host around 10,000 to 15,000 undocumented Brazilian gold miners working under harsh conditions. Healthcare in these areas is free and accessible to everyone, including undocumented migrants, through a network of 17 centers staffed by professionals trained in mainland France. The region reflects a complex interplay of migration, inequality, and public services, where both chronic and infectious diseases remain major health challenges.

The Agence Française de Développement (AFD) and the Hospital Center of Western Guiana (HCWG) have partnered to enhance cross-border healthcare between French Guiana and Suriname. This collaboration includes the opening of two new hospitals, one in Saint-Laurent du Maroni and another in Albina. The agreement is aimed at providing essential medical services for residents on both sides of the border, permitting cross-border patient transfers and enabling Surinamese residents to receive treatments like dialysis and chemotherapy closer to home, thereby reducing the need for long journeys to Paramaribo. Additionally, a dedicated team, including coordinators, a social worker, and an interpreter, has been established to facilitate these cross-border healthcare services.

=== Fertility ===
The total fertility rate in French Guiana has remained high and is today considerably higher than that of metropolitan France, as well as most of the other French overseas departments. It is largely responsible for the rapid population growth of French Guiana.

Total fertility rate
	1999	2000	2001	2002	2003	2004	2005	2006	2007	2008	2009	2010	2011	2012	2013	2014	2015	2016	2017	2018
French Guiana	3.87	3.93	3.79	3.73	3.77	3.47	3.79	3.80	3.73	3.57	3.49	3.37	3.42	3.60	3.47	3.44	3.44	3.61	3.93	3.82
4 overseas departments^{A}	2.32	2.45	2.42	2.35	2.38	2.40	2.46	2.48	2.48	2.46	2.42	2.39	2.40	2.48	2.44	N/A	N/A	N/A	N/A	N/A
Metropolitan France	1.79	1.87	1.88	1.86	1.87	1.90	1.92	1.98	1.96	1.99	1.99	2.02	2.00	1.99	1.97	1.97	1.93	1.89	1.86	1.84
Source: INSEE^{A} Data for the four overseas departments of French Guiana, Martinique, Guadeloupe, and Réunion, not including the new overseas department of Mayotte.

== Culture ==
=== Festivities ===
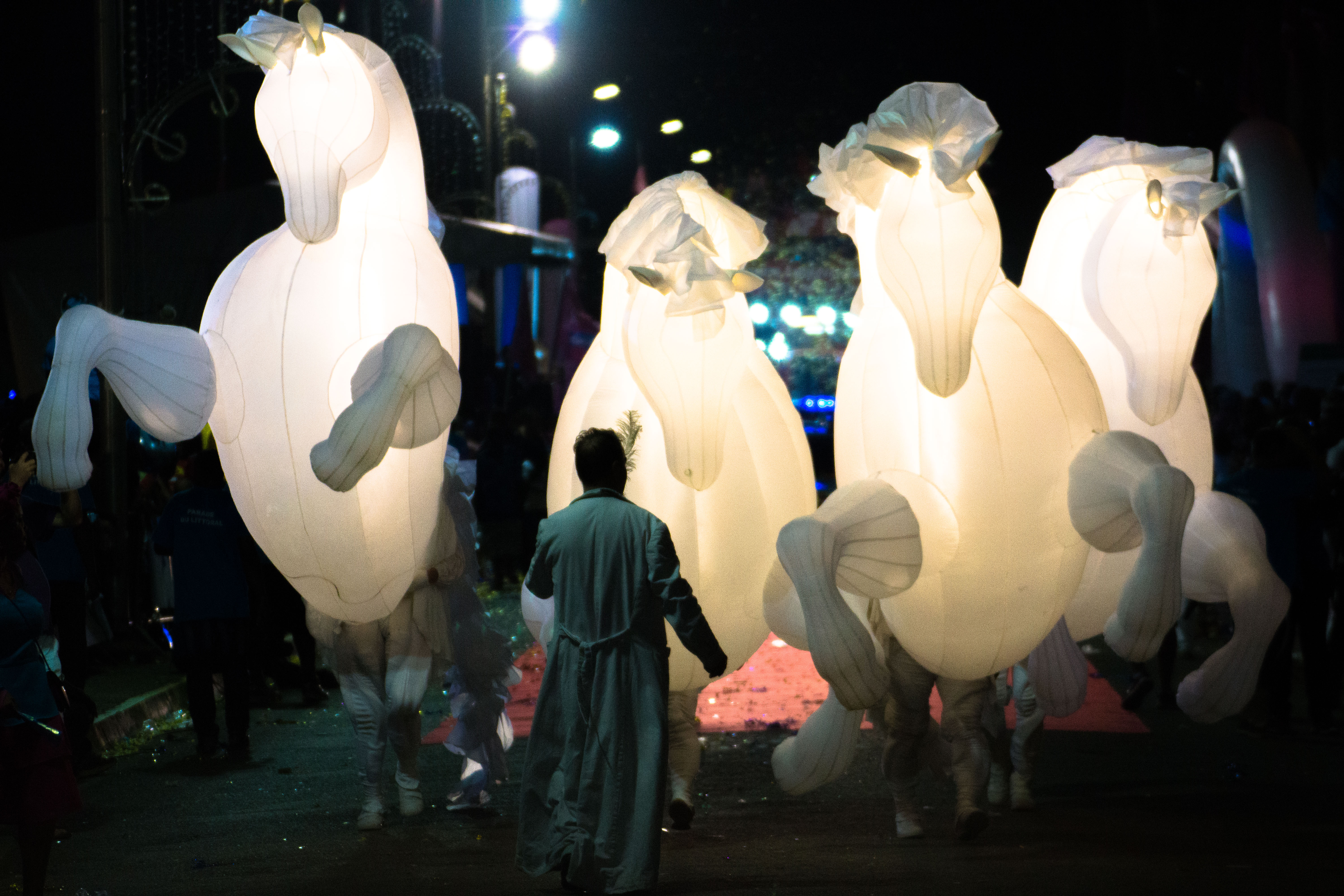
Horses of air and light at the Big Parade of the Litoral, in Kourou

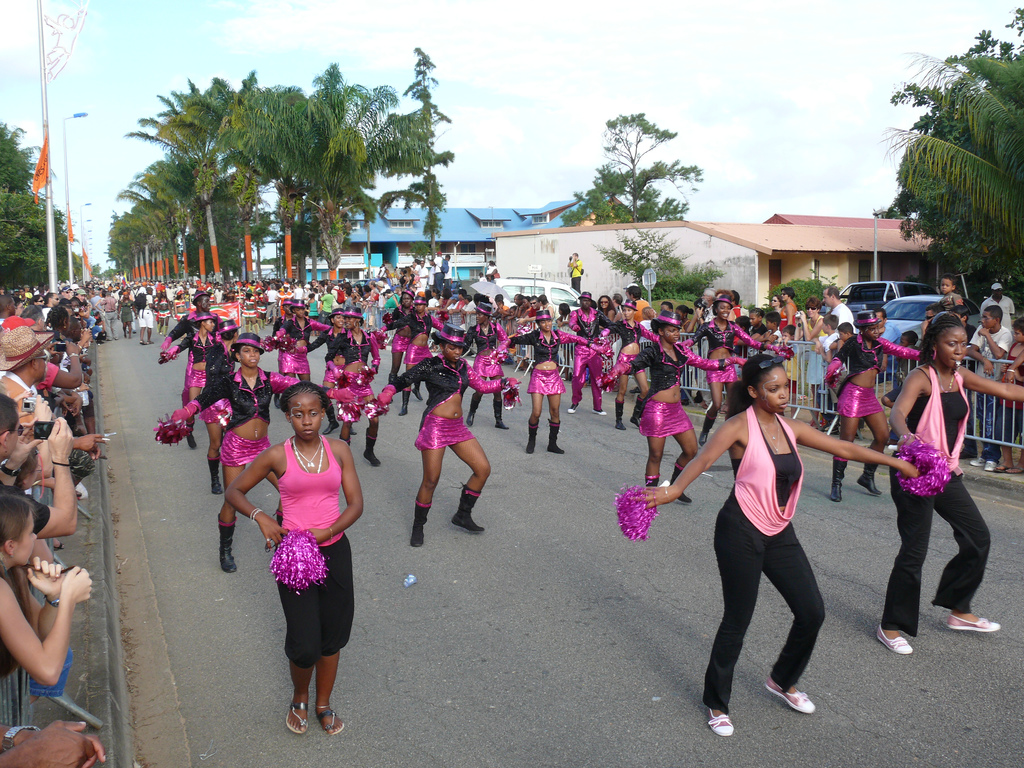
Carnival of Kourou

The Carnival is one of the major events in French Guiana. Considered the longest in the world, it takes place on afternoon of Sunday, between Epiphany at the beginning of January and Ash Wednesday in February or (month). Groups disguised according to the theme of the year parade around decorated floats to the rhythm of percussion and brass. The preparation of the groups starts months before the carnival. The groups parade in front of thousands of spectators who gather on the sidewalks and bleachers arranged for the occasion.

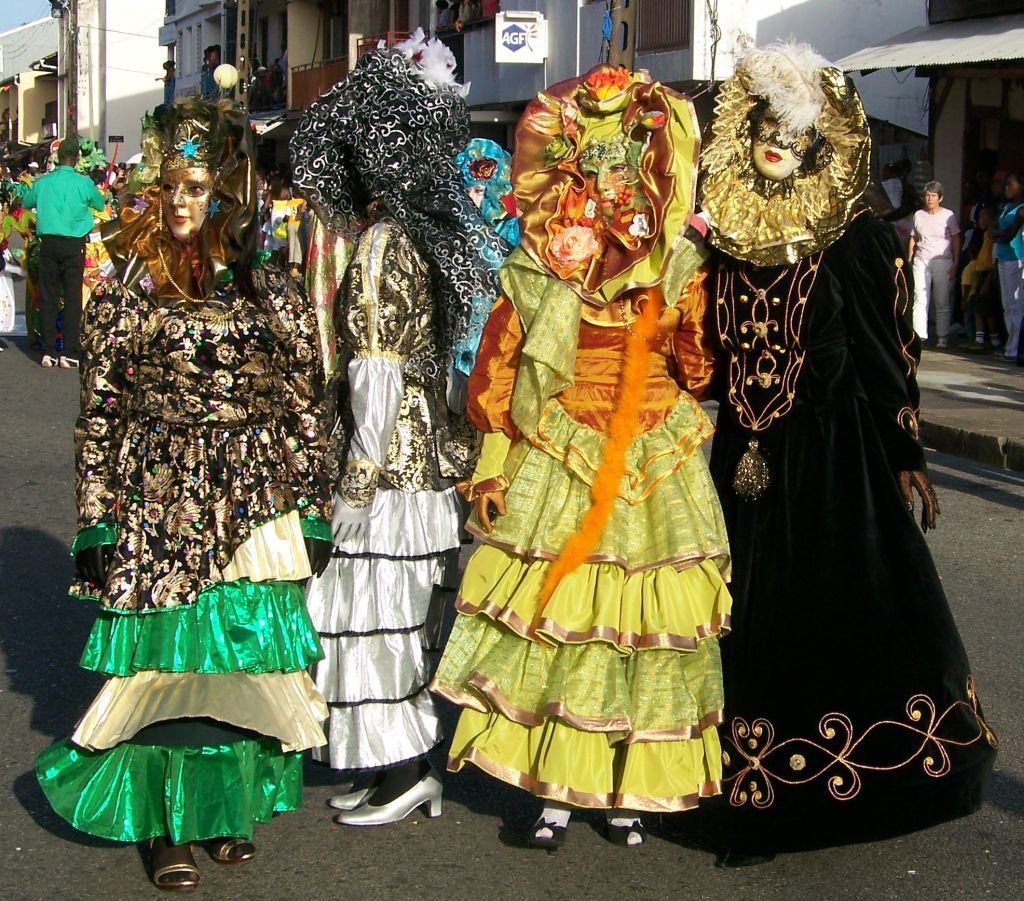
Touloulous in Cayenne streets in 2007

Brazilian groups identical to those in the Rio carnival are also appreciated for their rhythms and their alluring costumes. The Chinese community of Cayenne also participates in the parades, adding elements such as dragons.

At the start of the evening, the Touloulous, typical characters of the French Guianan carnival, go to the dancings to participate in the famous paré-masked balls.

=== Architecture ===
Thémire house, Creole style, in Cayenne

The local architecture is characterized by its Creole, Amerindian and Bushinenge influences. The main towns contain predominantly Creole-style architecture, with some Western-style buildings and forts. In communes with black Maroon populations, houses in Bushinengue styles are commonly found. Amerindian communes are recognized for their pre-colonial type carbets. Most of these buildings were designed with local materials, such as wood from the Amazonian forests and bricks made on site. These local architectural styles blend with contemporary buildings.

=== Literature ===
French Guianan literature includes all works written by local authors or persons related to French Guiana. It is expressed both in French and in French Guianan Creole.

Local literature is a literature closely related to that of the French West Indies: especially the Caribbean islands of Martinique and Guadeloupe. For some, it is an Antillean-Guianan literature in relation to the themes addressed, which are mainly related to slavery and other social problems. Thus, this literature takes several forms. First, orality, because it is a characteristic element of French Guianan literature, as in many countries of Black America. In this connection, we can consider tales, Legends, fables and, in another form, Novels.

Nineteenth century French Guiana is marked by a weak presence of writers. At that time, writers only published a few scattered poems in local newspapers. Today, however, it is difficult to trace the writings of some French Guianan poets: Ho-A-Sim-Elosem, Munian, R. Octaville, etc. Two French Guianan poets are the exception. According to Ndagano (1996), Ismaÿl Urbain and Fabien Flavien would be considered the first French Guianan poets. However, Alfred Parépou is a writer who marked his era with his work Atipa (1885).

The period from 1900 to 1950 constitutes an important stage in local literature insofar as it gave birth to numerous writers who had a considerable impact, such as those of the Négritude framework. The French Guianan of the 1950s and 1960s is notable for writing about the black cause. Serge Patient and Elie Stephenson did address this issue in their writings.

Since 1970 different generations of writers have become aware of the black cause or slavery. Whether through their writings or their political activities, they take into account this painful period that had serious consequences on the local society and on the black world in general. For this generation, Christiane Taubira remains the figurehead. Other writers are interested in other types of themes, such as regional nature, etc.

=== Cuisine ===
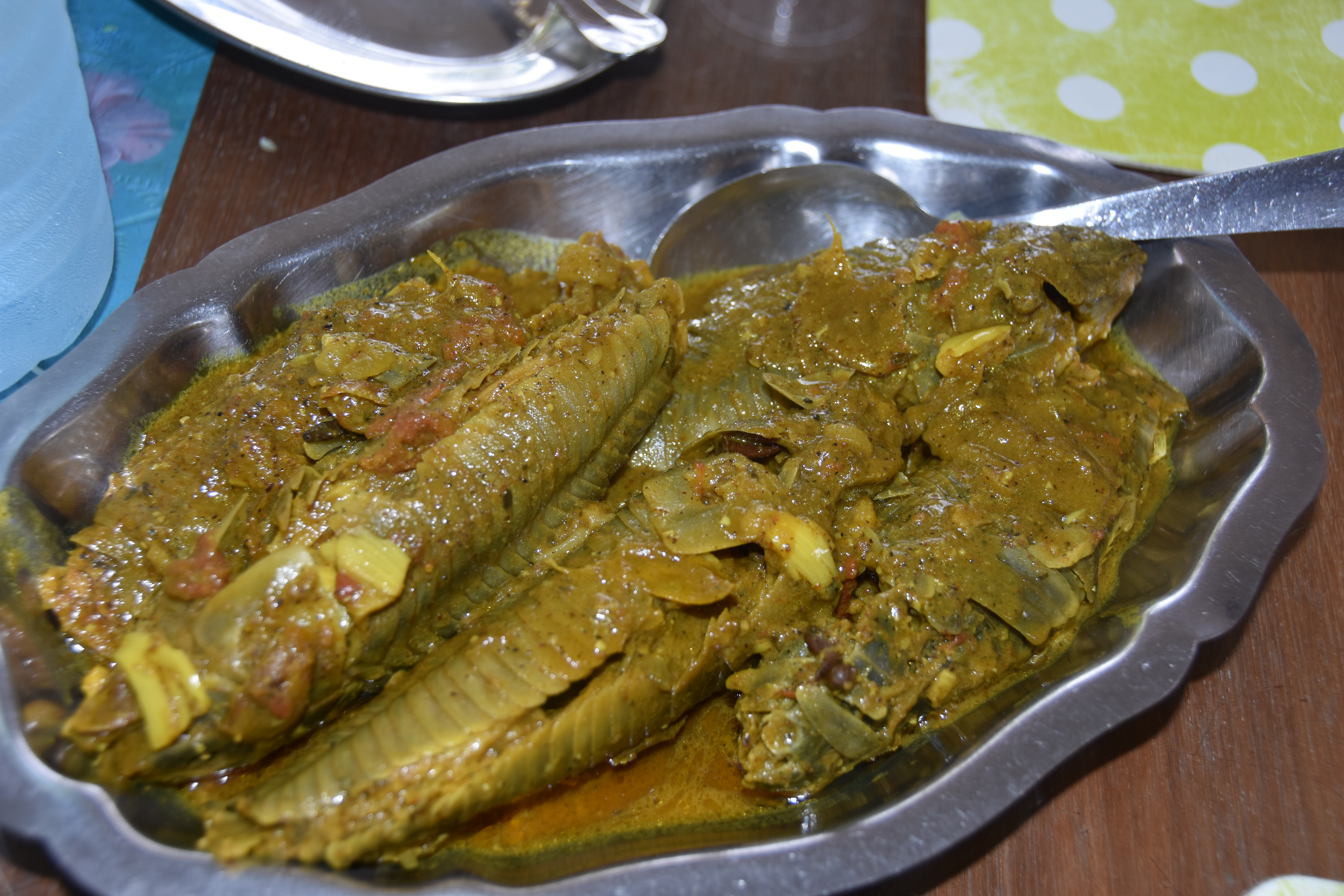
Atipa in coconut milk, typical dish of Guiana cuisine

French Guianan cuisine is rich in the different cultures that mix in French Guiana. Creole restaurants rub shoulders with Chinese restaurants in large cities such as Cayenne, Kourou and Saint-Laurent-du-Maroni. The local culinary art originally brought together Guianan Creole, Bushinengue and Native South American cuisines.

All of these cuisines have several ingredients in common:

- Manioc;
- Smoked meats and fish

This southern Caribbean territory has many typical dishes, such as Awara broth, Creole galette, Dizé milé, Countess, Cramanioc pudding, Kalawanng, Couac gratin and salad, Fricasse of iguana or its famous Pimentade (fish or chicken court-bouillon).

Atipas are local fishes beloved by the French Guianese often prepared with coconut milk.

At Easter, French Guianan people eat a traditional dish called Awara broth.

For weddings, locals traditionally eat Colombo, which is a type of curry that has become a staple of the French Guianese cuisine.

=== Sport ===
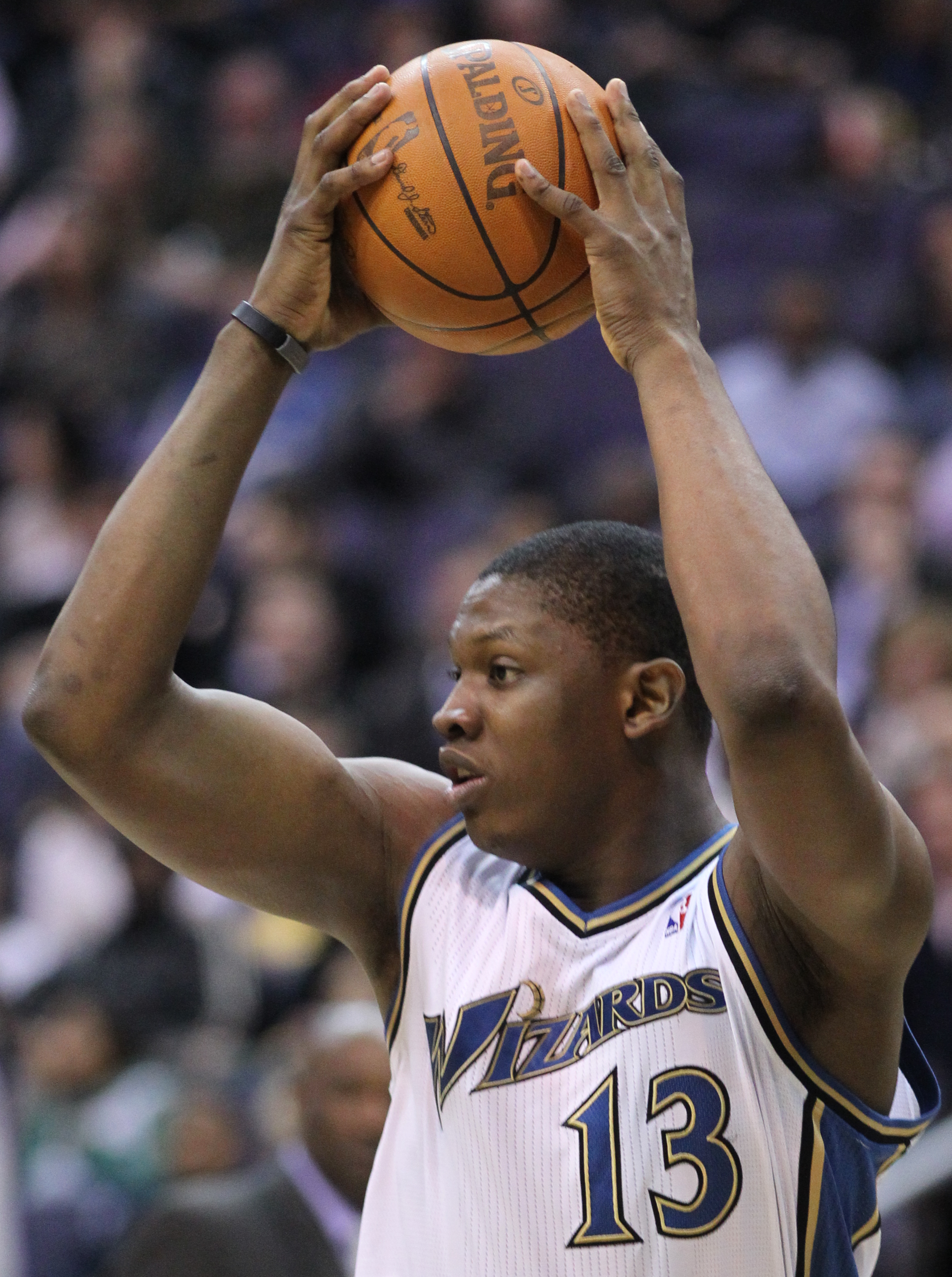
Kevin Séraphin, ex NBA player

Sport in French Guiana dates back to long before the colonial period. Popularized since the 19th century, the first sports competition organized to commemorate 14 July was held in 1890. At that time, there were already physical activities that were favorable to the native population of the Amazonian territory, as well as sports introduced from Europe, which favored the colonizers. There were foot races, donkey races, canoe races, bicycle races, tricycle races, nautical regattas in the ports, and traditional popular games.

The most popular sport in French Guiana today is football, followed by basketball, cycling, swimming and handball, although there are some canoeing, judo, Brazilian jiu-jitsu, aikido, karate, fencing, horseback riding, rowing and volleyball clubs in the department.

As a French Overseas department, Guiana is not a member of the Pan American Sports Organization; rather, athletes compete within the French National Olympic and Sports Committee and are governed by the Ligue d'Athlétisme de la Guyane, a sub-unit of the Fédération française d'athlétisme.

Starting in 1960, the Tour of Guiana, an annual multiple-stage bicycle race, is held.

==== Football ====
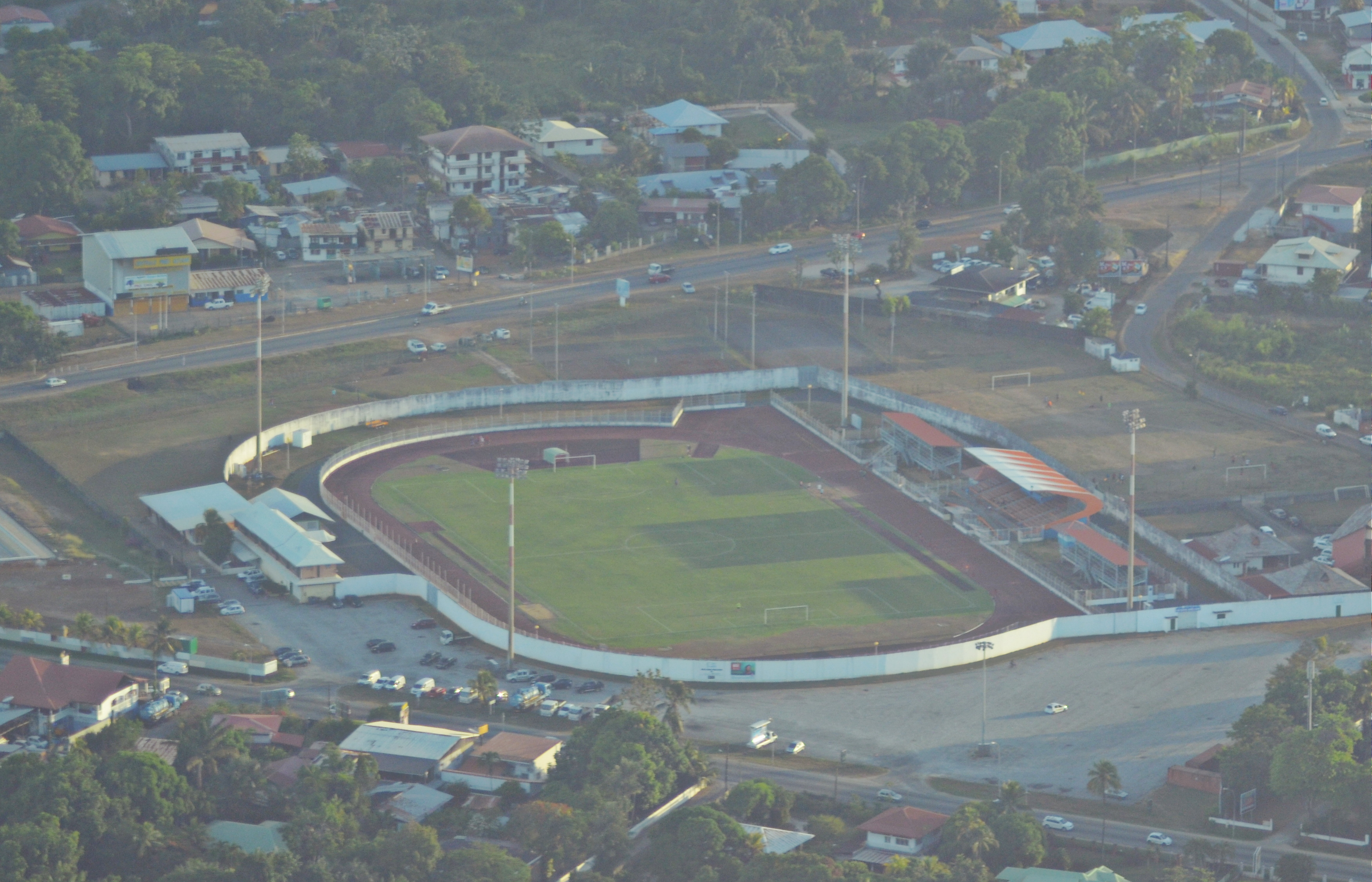
Georges-Chaumet Stadium, French Guiana

The territory has its own local team, the French Guiana football team. A regional football league, the LFG (Ligue de Football de la Guyane), was established in October 1962. It is currently not affiliated to FIFA, but has been affiliated to the FFF (French Football Federation) since 27 April 1963 and has been an associate member of CONCACAF (North, Central American and Caribbean League) since 1978. In April 2013, the LFG became a full member of CONCACAF.

The French Guiana Football Team, also known as Yana Dòkò, is a selection of the best local players under the auspices of the LFG. It is not recognized by FIFA, but participates in CONCACAF competitions. It played its first match against Dutch Guiana (now Suriname) in 1936, losing 3-1. It had its biggest victory on 26 September 2012 against St. Pierre and Miquelon (11-1) and its biggest defeat was also against Dutch Guiana, losing 9-0 on 2 March 1947.

The team has participated in events such as the CONCACAF Nations Cup / Gold Cup, Caribbean Nations Cup (between 1978 and 2017), CONCACAF Nations League, Overseas Cup (Coupe de l'Outre-Mer, 2008–2012) and the Tournament of 4 (Tournoi des 4).

==== Tour ====
The Tour of Guiana (locally: Tour de Guyane), formerly known as "Le Tour du Littoral" (the Littoral Tour) or more rarely as "La Grande Boucle Guayanaise", is a cycling stage race that takes place mainly in French Guiana each year, although it occasionally crosses neighbouring countries.

It takes place in nine stages, with a route linking the main towns of the department: Cayenne, Kourou, and Saint-Laurent-du-Maroni. It was created in 1950 and is organised by the Comité Régional de Cyclisme de la Guyane (French Guiana Cycling Committee).

The tour has been international since 1978. Over the years it has gained in importance and popularity and its duration has increased. The participation has grown from a mostly French Guianan group in the first editions to editions with more than 10 different nationalities. The 2020 edition of the Tour could not take place due to the COVID-19 pandemic. This is also the case for the Tour in 2021.

== See also ==
- Index of French Guiana-related articles
- List of French Guianans
- List of colonial and departmental heads of French Guiana
- Republic of Independent Guiana
