= Law on Departmentalization =

1946 French law

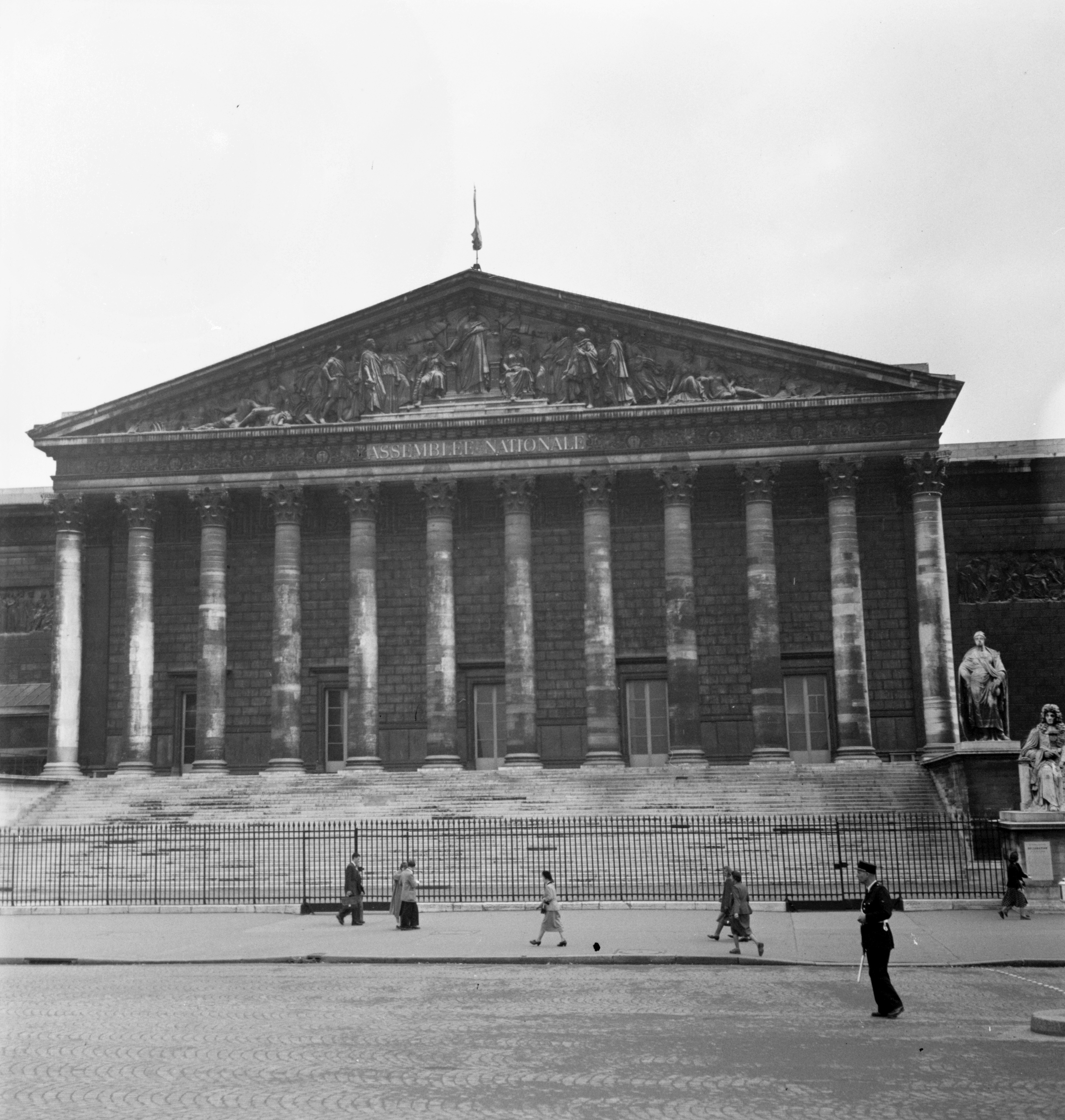

National Constituent Assembly
- Enacted by: National Constituent Assembly
- Enacted: March 19, 1946
- Introduced by: Provisional Government of the French Republic

Related legislation
- Senatus-Consult of May 3, 1854

The Law on Departmentalization (French: Loi de départementalisation) is a French law adopted in 1946 that established the "four vieilles colonies (old colonies) of Guadeloupe, Martinique, Réunion, and French Guiana as overseas departments of France.

The law was unanimously adopted following a proposal by Aimé Césaire, the youngest deputy from Overseas France. It symbolically and practically marked the integration of these territories. These regions were thereby removed from the French colonial empire and came under the administration of prefects reporting to the French Ministry of the Interior.

== Drafting ==
The Law on Departmentalization originated from several legislative proposals. The first, presented by Léopold Bissol, pertained to Martinique. The second, proposed by Gaston Monnerville, concerned French Guiana. The third, by Raymond Vergès, addressed Réunion, and the last, focused on Guadeloupe, was submitted by Eugénie Éboué-Tell.

== Text ==
From the Official Journal of the French Republic

LAW No. 46-451 of March 19, 1946, concerning the classification of Guadeloupe, Martinique, Réunion, and French Guiana as French departments.

The National Constituent Assembly has adopted, The President of the Provisional Government of the French Republic promulgates the following law:

- Article 1. - The colonies of Guadeloupe, Martinique, Réunion, and French Guiana are established as French departments.
- Article 2. - Laws and decrees currently in force in metropolitan France but not yet applied to these colonies shall, before January 1, 1947, be the subject of application decrees for these new departments. (This deadline was extended first to December 31 1947 and then to March 31, 1948)
- Article 3. - Upon the promulgation of this law, new laws applicable to metropolitan France shall also apply to these departments, with explicit mention in the text. This law, deliberated and adopted by the National Constituent Assembly, shall be enacted as a state law.

Signed in Paris, March 19, 1946. Félix Gouin.

By the President of the Provisional Government of the Republic: The Minister of Overseas France, Marius Moutet. The Minister of the Interior, André Le Troquer.

== Commemorations ==
The adoption of this Law on Departmentalization is periodically celebrated in the affected territories. Street names commemorating March 19, 1946, help maintain this historical memory.

== See also ==
- 2009 Mahoran status referendum
