= Antoine Poussier =

French civil servant and Prefect of French Guiana

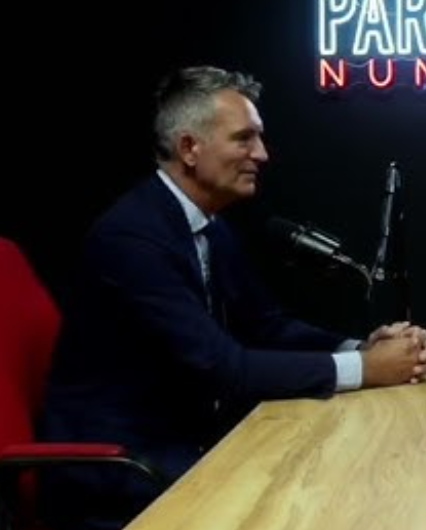
- Antoine Poussier in 2024

Prefect of French Guiana
- Incumbent
- Assumed office August 21, 2023
- Preceded by: Thierry Queffelec

Director of the Cabinet of the Prefect of Martinique
- In office 25 May 2010 – 30 May 2012
- Succeeded by: Matthieu Garrigue-Guyonnaud

Secretary-General of the Prefecture of Martinique
- In office 27 November 2018 – August 2022
- Preceded by: Didier Martin
- Succeeded by: Aurélien Adam

Personal details
- Born: September 1974 (age 51), France

Military service
- Branch/service: French Navy
- Years of service: 1994-2008
- Rank: Lieutenant de vaisseau

Antoine Poussier (born September 1974) is a French politician and naval officer who has served as the Prefect of French Guiana since 21 August 2023.

He also served as Director of the Cabinet of the Prefect and later Secretary-General of the Prefecture in Martinique, as well as an Advisor on Overseas Affairs during the premierships of Jean Castex and Élisabeth Borne, and was appointed to the Council of Ministers on 14 July 2023.
