= Air Guyane Express =

Airline in French Guiana

Air Guyane
| IATA | ICAO | Call sign |
|---|---|---|
| 3S | GUY | GREENBIRD |
- Commenced operations: 1 June 2002
- Ceased operations: 2 August 2023
- Hubs: Cayenne-Rochambeau Airport
- Subsidiaries: Air Antilles
- Fleet size: 2
- Destinations: 5
- Parent company: CAIRE Group
- Headquarters: Cayenne-Rochambeau Airport, Matoury, French Guiana
- Employees: 78 (2023)
- Website: airguyane.com

Air Guyane SP was a French Guianan regional airline with its head office on the grounds of Cayenne-Rochambeau Airport in Matoury. It operated regional scheduled flights. Its main base was Cayenne-Rochambeau Airport.

== History ==
On June 1, 2002, Air Guyane Express began operations after taking over the former airline Air Guyane operations. It also operates in the French Antilles with 2 ATR 42 aircraft on routes between Fort-de-France, Pointe-à-Pitre, Saint Martin and Sainte Lucie under the brand Air Antilles Express.

The airline was placed into liquidation by the Mixed Commercial Court of Pointe-à-Pitre on August 2, 2023, and it was folded on October 1 of the same year.

== Destinations ==
By April 2023, Air Guyane Express operated scheduled passenger flights to the following destinations:

- Cayenne – Cayenne-Rochambeau Airport Hub
- Grand Santi – Grand Santi Airport
- Maripasoula – Maripasoula Airport
- Saint-Laurent du Maroni – Saint-Laurent du Maroni Airport
- Saül – Saül Airport

== Fleet ==
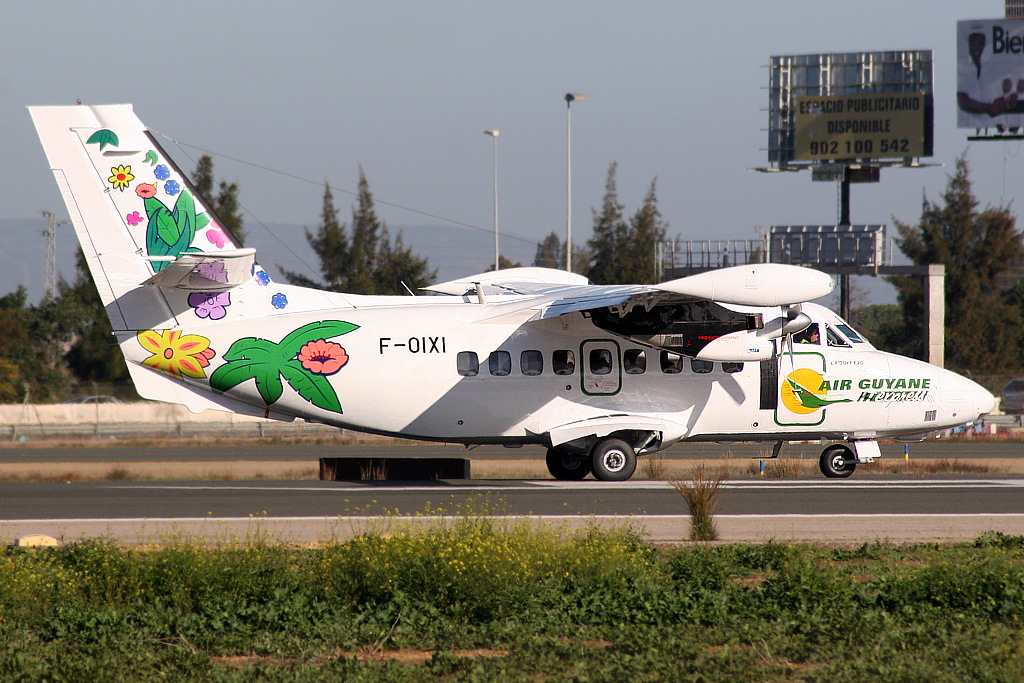
Air Guiana Express Let L-410

Air Guyane consisted of the following aircraft (as of April 2023).:

Air Guyane fleet
| Aircraft | In service | Orders | Passengers | Notes |
|---|---|---|---|---|
| Let L-410 Turbolet | 2 | — | 19 | small |
| Total | 2 | — | | |

The aircraft previously operated the following aircraft:

- 1 ATR 42-300 (operated by Air Antilles)
- 3 ATR 42-500 (2 operated by Air Antilles)
- 1 Britten-Norman Islander
- 2 De Havilland Canada DHC-6 Twin Otter
- 1 Reims-Cessna F406 Caravan II

== See also ==
- Air Antilles
- List of defunct airlines of the Americas
