= Argent (disambiguation) =

Argent is the heraldic tincture of silver.

Argent may also refer to:

== Entertainment ==
- Argent (band), a 1960s–1970s British rock band
  - Argent (album), a 1970 album by the band
  - Rod Argent (born 1945), keyboardist and founding member of the Zombies and Argent
- Argent (character), a DC Comics superheroine
- Argent (TV channel), a defunct Canadian French-language cable channel
- Argent energy, a fictional form of energy seen in the Doom video game series

== Business ==
- Argent Corporation, a defunct hotel/casino company in Las Vegas, Nevada, U.S.
- Argent Ventures, a privately held real estate company based in New York City
- Argent LLP, a UK property developer; see King's Cross Central
- Argent Mortgage, a unit of the defunct American company Ameriquest Mortgage

== Other uses ==
- Argent (surname)
- Argent (Middlesex cricketer), 19^{th}-century English cricketer
- Argent Centre, a historic building in Birmingham, England
- Argent-sur-Sauldre, a commune in France
- silver (a precious metal), in French

== See also ==
- Argenta (disambiguation)
- L'Argent (disambiguation)
- Montagne d'Argent, a hill in north-east French Guiana
