= List of airports in French Guiana =

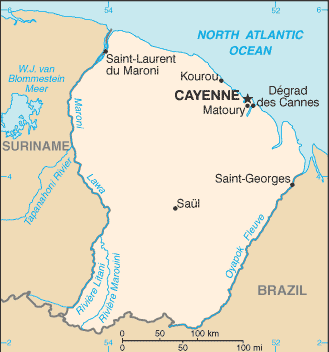
Map of French Guiana

This is a list of airports in French Guiana, sorted by location.

French Guiana (French: Guyane française, officially Guyane) is an overseas department (département d'outre-mer, DOM) of France, located on the northern Atlantic coast of South America. It has borders with two nations, Brazil to the east and south, and Suriname to the west. The capital city is Cayenne.

== Airports ==
ICAO location identifiers are linked to each airport's Aeronautical Information Publication (AIP), which are available online in Portable Document Format (PDF) from the French Service d'information aéronautique (SIA). Locations shown in bold are as per the airport's AIP page. Airport names shown in bold have scheduled commercial airline service.

City served / Location	ICAO	IATA	Airport name	Usage	Coordinates
Cayenne	SOCA	CAY	**Cayenne – Félix Eboué Airport**	Public	04°49′11″N 52°21′43″W
Camopi	SOCM		**Camopi Airport**	Restricted	03°10′20″N 52°20′10″W
**Grand Santi**	SOGS	GSI	**Grand-Santi Airport**	Restricted	04°17′00″N 54°22′52″W
Kourou	SOOK		Kourou Airport		5°10′25″N 52°41′29″W
**Maripasoula**	SOOA	MPY	**Maripasoula Airport**	Restricted	03°39′27″N 54°02′14″W
Ouanary	SOSA		Ouanary Airport		04°12′36″N 51°40′4″W
**Régina**	SOOR	REI	Régina Airport	Restricted	04°18′53″N 52°07′54″W
**Saint-Georges**-de-l'Oyapock	SOOG	OYP	Saint-Georges-de-l'Oyapock Airport	Restricted	03°53′36″N 51°48′20″W
**Saint-Laurent**-du-Maroni	SOOM	LDX	**Saint-Laurent-du-Maroni Airport**	Public	05°28′59″N 54°02′04″W
**Saül**	SOOS	XAU	**Saül Airport**	Restricted	03°36′49″N 53°12′15″W
Sinnamary	SOOY		Sinnamary Airport	Closed	05°22′25″N 52°56′44″W

== See also ==
- Transport in French Guiana
- List of airports in France
- List of airports by ICAO code: S#SO - French Guiana
- Wikipedia: WikiProject Aviation/Airline destination lists: South America#French Guiana (France)
