= List of airlines of France =

This is a list of active/operating airlines which have an Air Operator Certificate issued by the Direction Générale de l'Aviation Civile, the civil aviation authority of France.

For French overseas departments and territories, see the pages of French Guiana, French Polynesia, Guadeloupe, Mayotte, New Caledonia, Réunion, Saint Pierre and Miquelon in their respective geographical areas.

== Scheduled airlines ==
Airline	IATA	ICAO	Headquarters	Image	Airline type	Commenced operations	Notes
Air Corsica	XK	CCM	Ajaccio		domestic	1990	Previously Cie. Aérienne Corse Mediterranée & "CCM"
Air France	AF	AFR	Roissy-en-France		Flag carrier	1933	
Air France Hop	A5	HOP	Rungis		regional	2013	Formed by the merger of three regional air carriers
Amelia	8R	AIA	Roissy-en-France		regional	2019	Belonging to Regourd Aviation Group
Chalair Aviation	CE	CLG	Carpiquet		regional	1986	
Corsair International	SS	CRL	Rungis		long-haul	1981	Previously Corse Air International, Corsair and Corsairfly
Finist'air		FTR	Guipavas		regional	1981	
French Bee	BF	FBU	Paris		long-haul	2016	Previously French Blue
La Compagnie	B0	DJT	Paris		long-haul	2014	
Oya Vendée Hélicoptères			L'Île-d'Yeu		helicopters	1983	
Transavia France	TO	TVF	Paray-Vieille-Poste		medium-haul	2007	
Twinjet	T7	TJT	Aix-en-Provence		regional	2001	

== Charter airlines ==
Airline	IATA	ICAO	Headquarters	Image	Operations	Commenced operations	Notes
Alpine Airlines			Courchevel		charter		
AstonJet			Toussus Le Noble		charter/medevac		
Avdef			Nîmes		defense contractor		
Evolem Aviation			Lyon Bron		charter		
iXair			Paris–Le Bourget Airport		charter		
JetCorp			Toulouse		charter		
OpenFlight			Marseille		charter/medevac		
Oyonnair			Lyon Bron		charter/medevac		
Phenix Aviation			Le Havre		charter/medevac		
VallJet			Paris–Le Bourget Airport		charter	2007	La Baule Aviation trading name
Voldirect			Rennes		charter		

== Cargo airlines ==
Airline	IATA	ICAO	Headquarters	Image	Operations	Commenced operations	Notes
Air France Cargo			Roissy-en-France		long-haul		Air France brand for cargo operations
Airbus Transport International - Airbus Beluga Transport			Toulouse		long-haul		Oversize loads specialist
ASL Airlines France	5O	FPO	Roissy-en-France		medium-haul	1987	Previously Intercargo Service, Aéropostale and Europe Airpost
CMA CGM Air Cargo	2C	CMA	Marseille		long-haul	2021	

== See also ==
- List of defunct airlines of France
- List of defunct airlines of Europe
- List of airlines
- List of airlines of Europe
