= Ouanary Airstrip =

Airport in French Guiana, South America

Ouanary Airport
- IATA: none; ICAO: none

Summary
- Serves: Ouanary, French Guiana
- Elevation AMSL: 40 ft / 12 m
- Coordinates: 4°12′40″N 51°40′00″W

Map
- Location in French Guiana

Runways
Direction	Length		Surface
Direction	m	ft	Surface
07/25	750	2,461	Dirt
- Sources: HERE/Nokia Maps GCM

Ouanary Airport is an airport serving Ouanary, a commune of French Guiana near its eastern border with Brazil. The village is on the Ournary River, 2.5 kilometres (1.6 mi) upstream from its entry into the Atlantic Ocean.

== See also ==
- List of airports in French Guiana
- Transport in French Guiana
