= Money (disambiguation) =

Money is a medium of exchange by which humans pay for things, or a unit of account or store of value.

Money may also refer to:

== Websites ==
- Money (financial website), a personal finance website, United States

== Places ==
- Money Creek, Minnesota, an unincorporated community, United States
- Money, Mississippi, an unincorporated community, United States
- Money, Virginia, an unincorporated community, United States
- Money, Foyran, a townland in Foyran civil parish, barony of Fore, County Westmeath, Republic of Ireland
- Money, a townland in County Armagh, Northern Ireland

== People ==
- Money (surname), a list of people with the name
- Money (nickname), a list of people known by the nickname
- Eddie Money (1949–2019), American musician
- JT Money, American musician
- J-Money, American musician, member of Cadillac Don & J-Money

== Books ==
- Money (play), an 1840 play by Edward Bulwer-Lytton
- Money (novel), a 1984 novel by Martin Amis
- Money (Australian magazine), an ACP Magazines business and finance magazine

== Film and television ==
- Money (1921 film), a comedy directed by Duncan McRae
- Money (1946 film), a Swedish comedy film
- Money (1991 film), a drama directed by Steven Hilliard Stern
- Money (2016 film), an American film
- Money (2019 film), a South Korean film
- Money (Australian TV program), a 1993–2002 Australian financial and investment television program hosted by Paul Clitheroe that was broadcast on Nine Network
- Money (British TV series), a 2010 two-part British television series based on the Martin Amis novel that aired on BBC
- "Money" (Blackadder), a television episode
- "Money" (The Office), a television episode
- "The Money" (Seinfeld), a television episode
- "The Money" (The Amazing World of Gumball), a television episode
- The Money, a 2014 television pilot featuring Ray Liotta
- Money, an Indian Telugu-language comedy film series
  - Money (1993 film), by Shiva Nageswara Rao, the first in the series
  - Money Money (film), 1995 film, second in the series
  - Money Money, More Money, 2011 film, third in the series
- Money, a character from the sixth season of Battle for Dream Island, an animated web series

== Music ==
- Money (band), an English rock band

=== Albums ===
- Money (album), by KMFDM, 1992
- Money, 2010 EP by Ringside
- M$ney, 2026 album by Asake

=== Songs ===
- "Money" (Pink Floyd song)
- "Money" (Cardi B song)
- "Money" (David Guetta song)
- "Money" (Elin Lanto song)
- "Money" (Geolier song)
- "Money" (Jamelia song)
- "Money" (KMFDM song)
- "Money" (K. T. Oslin song)
- "Money" (Lawson song)
- "Money" (Lime Cordiale song)
- "Money" (Lisa song)
- "Money" (Michael Jackson song)
- "Money" (The Drums song)
- "Money (That's What I Want)", by Barrett Strong, also covered by The Beatles and by The Flying Lizards
- "Money", by 5 Seconds of Summer, from the album Sounds Good Feels Good
- "Money", by Anson Lo
- "Money", by Badfinger, from the album Straight Up
- "Money", by Bizzy Bone featuring Twista, from the album A Song for You
- "Money", by Bros, from the album The Time
- "Money", by Charli Baltimore, from the album Cold as Ice
- "Money", by Drake, from the mixtape Room for Improvement
- "Money", by Miquela
- "Money", by That Poppy, from the EP Bubblebath
- "Money", by The Game, from the album LAX
- "Money", by Gamma Ray, from the album Heading for Tomorrow
- "Money", by Girls Aloud, from the album The Sound of Girls Aloud: The Greatest Hits
- "Money", by Gladys Knight & The Pips, from the album 2nd Anniversary
- "Money", by the Human League, from the album Crash
- "Money", by I Fight Dragons, from the EP Cool Is Just a Number
- "Money", by JID from the album The Forever Story
- "Money", by John Butler Trio, from the album Three
- "Money", by John Kander and Fred Ebb, from the musical Cabaret
- "Money", by Laura Nyro, from the album Smile
- "Money", by the Lottery Winners from the album Anxiety Replacement Therapy
- "Money", by The Lovin' Spoonful, from the album Everything Playing
- "Money", by Mindless Self Indulgence, from the album If
- "Money", by Peace, from the album Happy People
- "Money", by Serj Tankian from the album Elect the Dead
- "Money", by Space, from the album Spiders
- "Money", by Suede, from the album Sci-Fi Lullabies
- "Money", by Vitamin C, from the album Vitamin C
- "Money", by Yes, from the album Tormato
- "Money", (also known as "Got Some Money"), by Bill Wurtz
- "Money Song", from the British television series Monty Python's Flying Circus
- "Gotta Get My Hands on Some (Money)", by Fatback Band

== Computing and Internet ==
- Money.co.uk, a UK-based price comparison website
- Microsoft Money, a financial software package

== See also ==
- "For the Love of Money", a 1973 song by the O'Jays
- Love of money
- "Money, Money, Money", a 1976 song by ABBA
- "Money Changes Everything", a 1978 song by The Brains
- "Money for Nothing", a 1985 song by Dire Straits
- The Money Programme, a former BBC finance and business affairs television programme
- Money Money (disambiguation)
- Money, Money, Money (disambiguation)
- L'Argent (disambiguation) (French for "money")
