= SOOG =

SOOG may refer to

- Saint-Georges-de-l'Oyapock Airport
- Sochi Olympic Organizing Committee
