= Kourou Airport =

Airport in French Guiana, South America

- IATA: none; ICAO: SOOK

Summary
- Operator: Conseil Général de la Guyane
- Serves: Kourou, French Guiana
- Elevation AMSL: 47 ft / 14 m
- Coordinates: 5°10′30″N 52°41′35″W

Map
- Location in French Guiana

Runways
Direction	Length		Surface
Direction	m	ft	Surface
09/27	1,260	4,134	Asphalt
- Source: Google Maps GCM

Kourou Airport (ICAO: SOOK) is an airport serving Kourou, a commune of French Guiana. Kourou is the location of the Centre Spatial Guyanais (CSG), the French and European spaceport.

== See also ==
- List of airports in French Guiana
- Transport in French Guiana
