= Money Money =

Money Money may refer to:

- "Money Money" (RBD song)
- "Money, Money", a 2002 song by Bone Thugs-n-Harmony
- "Money Money", a 2021 song by Roxen, DMNDS and Strange Fruits
- "Money, Money", a song from the 1972 film Cabaret
- Money Money (film), a 1995 Indian Telugu-language comedy film, second part of the Money film series

== See also ==
- Money (disambiguation)
- Money, Money, Money (disambiguation)
