= Régina Airport =

Airport in French Guiana, South America

- IATA: REI; ICAO: SOOR

Summary
- Operator: Conseil général de la Guyane
- Serves: Régina, French Guiana
- Elevation AMSL: 20 ft / 6 m
- Coordinates: 04°18′50″N 52°07′57″W

Map
- Location of airport in French Guiana

Runways
Direction	Length		Surface
Direction	m	ft	Surface
06/24	800	2,625	Asphalt
- Source: SkyVector Google Maps GCM

Régina Airport (IATA: REI, ICAO: SOOR) is an airport serving Régina, a commune of French Guiana on the Approuague River. The runway lies along the west side of the village.

== See also ==
- List of airports in French Guiana
- Transport in French Guiana
