= Argenta =

Argenta may refer to:

== People ==
- Argenta (surname)

== Places ==
- Argenta, British Columbia, Canada, a settlement
- Argenta, Emilia–Romagna, Italy, a town and comune in the province of Ferrara
- Argenta, Illinois, United States, a village
- Argenta, Montana, United States, a census-designated place
- Argenta, Nevada, United States, a ghost town abandoned in 1870
- Argenta Historic District, North Little Rock, Arkansas, United States, on the National Register of Historic Places

== Other uses ==
- HMS Argenta, a prison ship of the British Armed Forces Royal Navy
- Argenta (bank), a Belgian bank
- Fiat Argenta, an Italian car
- Argenta, a fictional human-like race, as well as their language, in the DOOM franchise.
