= Corsair International =

French airline

Corse Air International - Corsairfly - Corsair International

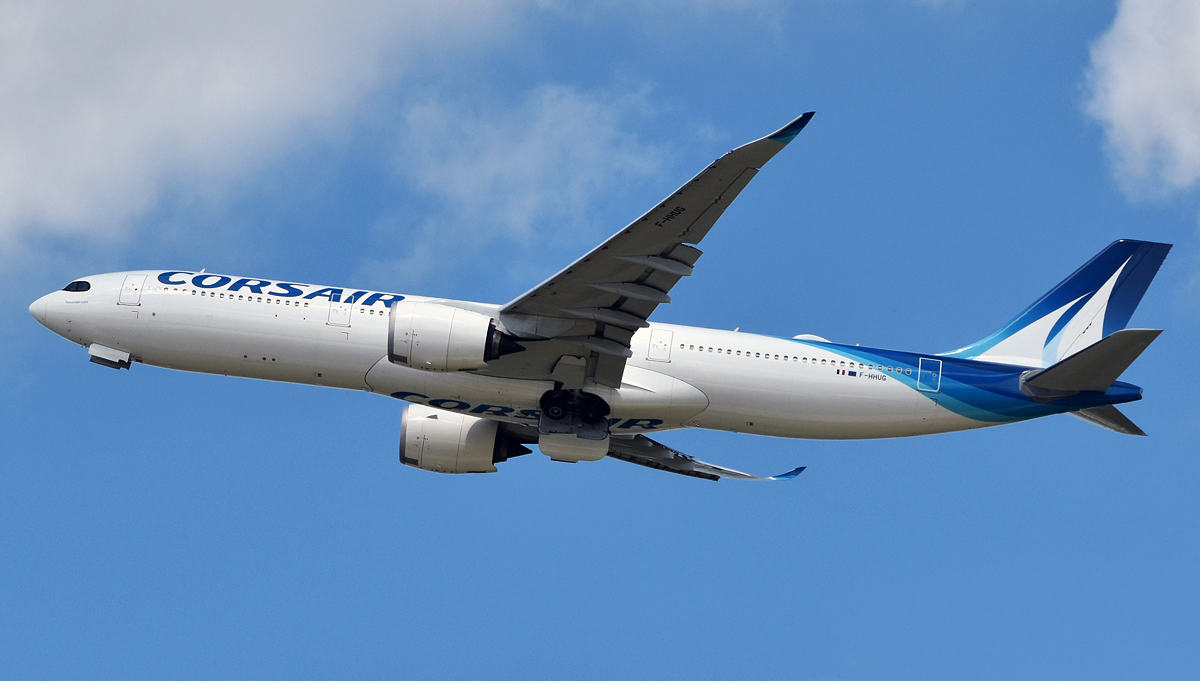
- Airbus A330-900
IATA	ICAO	Call sign
SS	CRL	CORSAIR
- Founded: 17 May 1981; 45 years ago as Corse Air International)
- Operating bases: Orly Airport
- Frequent-flyer program: Club Corsair
- Fleet size: 9
- Destinations: 14
- Parent company: Consortium of West Indian Investors
- Headquarters: Baie-Mahault, Guadeloupe, France
- Key people: Pascal de Izaguirre (Chairman and CEO).
- Revenue: ▲€470,582,300 (2018)
- Website: www.flycorsair.com

Corsair International (French: [kɔʁsɛʁ]), legally Corsair S.A., previously Corsairfly and Corse Air International, is a French airline headquartered in Baie-Mahault, Guadeloupe, and based at Orly Airport. It is a subsidiary of German investor Intro Aviation (53%) and TUI Group (27%). It operates scheduled long-haul services to leisure destinations in the French overseas territories, Africa and North America, as well as charter flights to other destinations.

== History ==
=== Early years ===
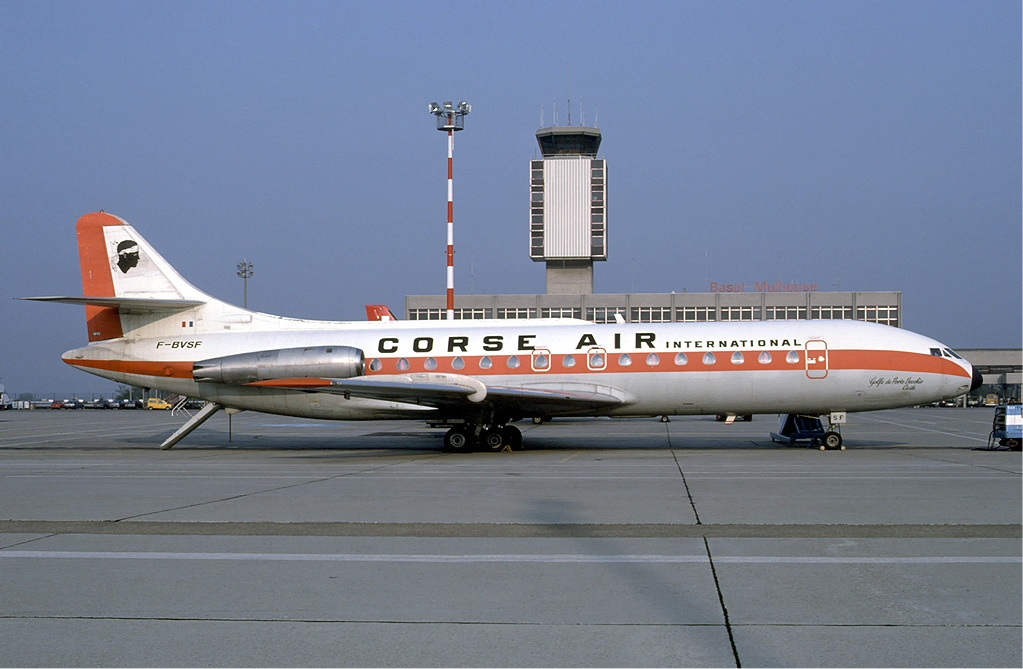
A Sud Aviation SE-210 Caravelle at EuroAirport Basel Mulhouse Freiburg in 1985

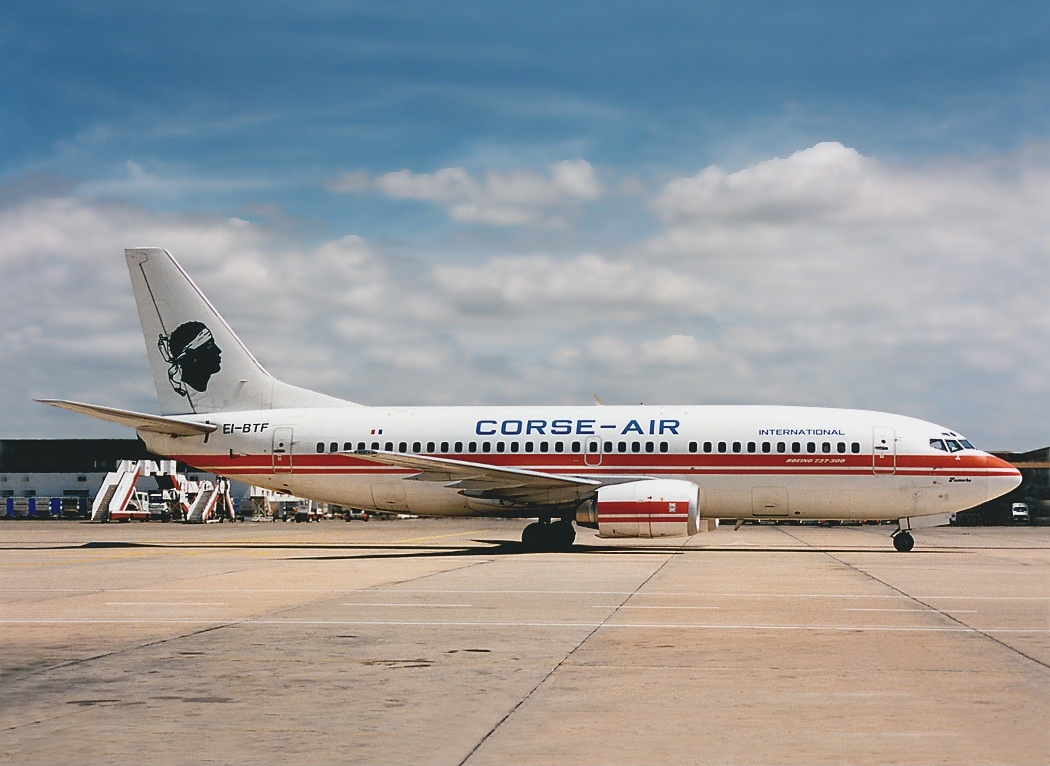
Boeing 737-300

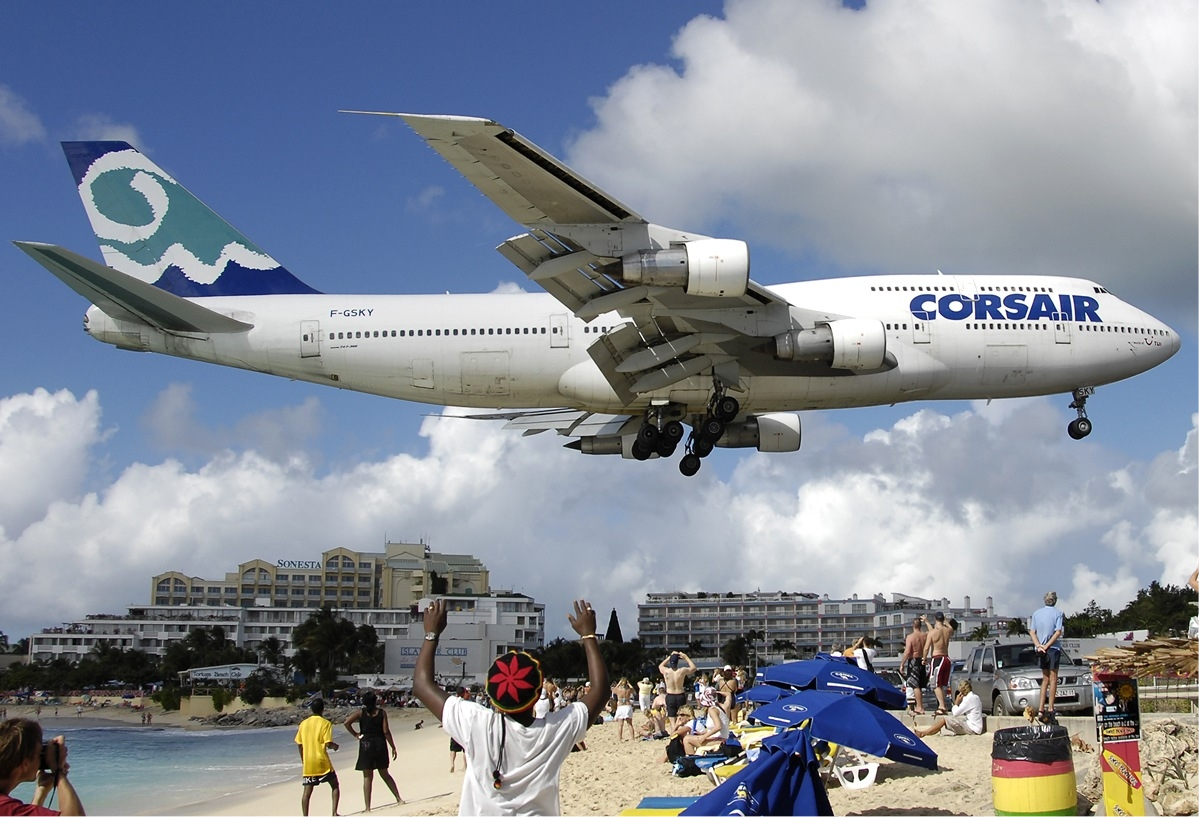
A Boeing 747-300 landing at Princess Juliana International Airport in 2007

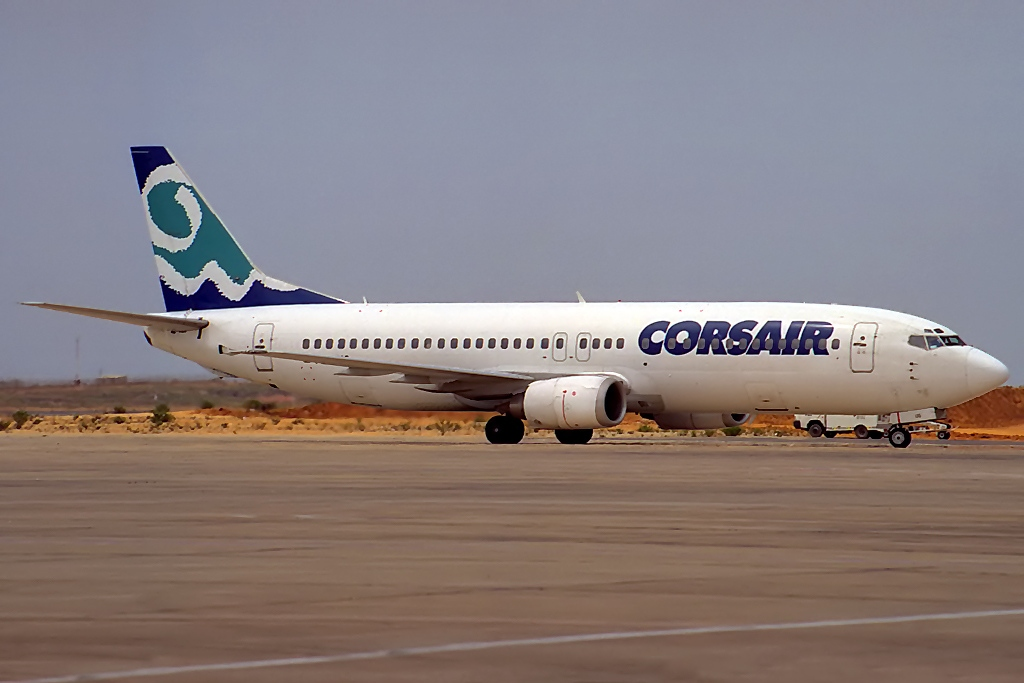
Boeing 737-400 in the 1990-2005 years colours

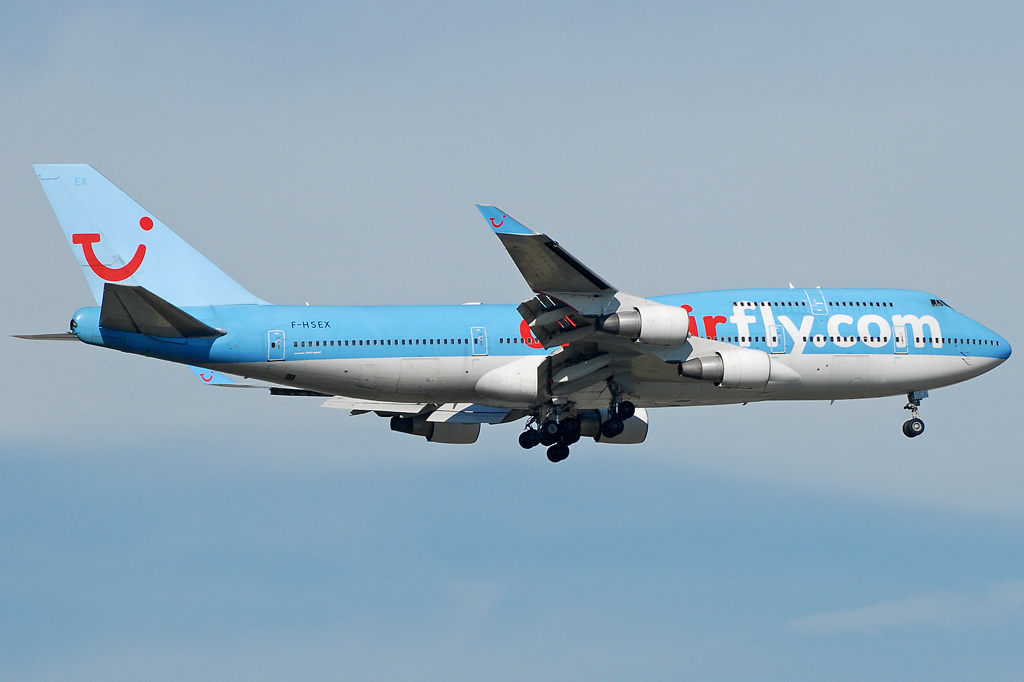
A Boeing 747-400 wearing the Corsairfly livery, 2008

Corse Air International was established in January of 1981 by the Corsican Rossi family and started operations on the 17 May. It dealt with charter flights only with a fleet of Sud Aviation SE-210 Caravelles. As business grew, the company first purchased the more modern Boeing 737 twin-jet aircraft and then also Boeing 747s. In 1990 it was acquired by Nouvelles Frontières, an important French tour operator, and the name was changed to Corsair. In 1991, the airline obtained worldwide traffic rights. In March 1999 the airline started the first scheduled flights, favoring those destinations that had already shown the greatest customers traffic. Great capacity Airbus A330 were bought and these twin-engined jetliners seemed the best answer to the increased demand for long-distance transport.

In 2000, the German TUI Group, one of the world's leading tour-operator firms, took over Nouvelles Frontières. In 2004, Corsair aircraft started being repainted with the colours of TUI, a blue fuselage with the TUI-logo, like its sister airlines. At the end of 2005, the TUI Group decided to rename all its affiliated airlines TUIfly. As an interim step Corsair aircraft were repainted with Corsairfly markings, although all airlines in the group were expected to have adopted the common TUIfly brand by 2008.

The airline held the record for most seats on a passenger aircraft, with 587 seats on its Boeing 747-400s, until they received a new interior which led to a new lower capacity of 533 passengers.

In 2008, the airline announced its intentions to expand its medium-haul network to the Mediterranean and its long-haul network to Canada and the United States (where it regularly flew in the 1990s), including the establishment of codeshare agreements with Air Canada. The first destination in this expansion was Miami in June 2010, but the rest of the plan was later abandoned due to a change in the airline's strategy.

=== Development since 2010 ===
In May 2010 Corsairfly announced its "Takeoff 2012" modernisation plan, including a reduction of workforce by 25%, the replacement of three Boeing 747-400s by two Airbus A330-300s from TUI Group, the refurbishment of all aircraft cabins, leaving the charter flights market, and the termination of routes to Kenya, the Dominican Republic, Québec City, Moncton and Israel.

In March 2012 the airline announced it would change its name to Corsair International and unveiled a new corporate image corresponding to planned operational changes. In 2015 Corsair's owner, German tourism company TUI Group, tried to sell the loss-making airline. After take-over negotiations with Air Caraïbes, the potential buyer walked away after advanced talks due to ongoing opposition from Corsair's staff unions regarding the proposed future developments and cost reductions. Also in 2015, TUI Group announced that all TUI companies and airlines except Corsair were to use the TUI name.

In late 2018 it was reported that the TUI Group had restarted talks to sell the loss-making airline. It was expected to be sold by the end of the year to German investment corporation Intro, which had owned several other airlines in the past. In May 2018, a Corsair shareholder announced that Corsair International would retire its three remaining Boeing 747-400s by September 2021 as part of fleet renewal and replacement plans. In March 2019, Corsair officially announced that it would lease three Airbus A330-900s to replace its three Boeing 747-400s.

In March 2019 TUI announced that it had agreed to sell 53% of Corsair to a German airline investor, Intro Aviation. TUI retained 27%, while employees held the remaining 20%. In October 2019, Corsair ended its codeshare agreement with Air Caraïbes.

The company announced on 19 April 2020 that it would immediately retire its three Boeing 747-400s because of the COVID-19 crisis and grounding. The then mixed fleet would have been transitioned to an all-A330 fleet, expected to comprise 13 aircraft by 2023.

In 2020, the airline was scheduled to be sold to a consortium.

On 17 August 2021, Corsair and Air Austral announced the formation of a joint venture between the two companies.

On 13 March 2024, Corsair received its first of four additional Airbus A330-900s as part of transitioning to a fleet composed entirely of A330-900s, thus retiring its remaining A330-300 aircraft by the end of the year.

== Destinations ==
As of August 2024, Corsair International operates or has previously operated to the following destinations:

Country or Territory	City	Airport	Notes	Refs
Benin	Cotonou	Cadjehoun Airport		
Canada	Halifax	Halifax Stanfield International Airport	Terminated	
Canada	Moncton	Greater Moncton Roméo LeBlanc International Airport	Terminated	
Canada	Montreal	Montréal–Trudeau International Airport	Terminated	
Canada	Quebec City	Québec City Jean Lesage International Airport	Terminated	
Cape Verde	Sal	Amílcar Cabral International Airport	Terminated	
Cuba	Havana	José Martí International Airport	Terminated	
Cuba	Santiago	Antonio Maceo Airport	Terminated	
Cuba	Varadero	Juan Gualberto Gómez Airport	Terminated	
Dominican Republic	La Romana	La Romana International Airport	Terminated	
Dominican Republic	Puerto Plata	Gregorio Luperón International Airport	Terminated	
Dominican Republic	Punta Cana	Punta Cana International Airport	Seasonal	
France	Bordeaux	Bordeaux–Mérignac Airport	Seasonal	
France	Lyon	Lyon–Saint-Exupéry Airport		
France	Marseille	Marseille Provence Airport		
France	Nantes	Nantes Atlantique Airport	Seasonal	
France	Paris	Orly Airport	Hub	
French Polynesia	Papeete	Fa'a'ā International Airport	Terminated	
Guadeloupe	Pointe-à-Pitre	Pointe-à-Pitre International Airport		
Haiti	Port-au-Prince	Toussaint Louverture International Airport	Terminated	
Israel	Tel Aviv	Ben Gurion Airport	Terminated	
Italy	Venice	Venice Marco Polo Airport	Terminated	
Ivory Coast	Abidjan	Félix-Houphouët-Boigny International Airport		
Madagascar	Antananarivo	Ivato International Airport		
Madagascar	Nosy Be	Fascene Airport	Terminated	
Mali	Bamako	Modibo Keita International Airport	Seasonal	
Malta	Luqa	Malta International Airport	Terminated	
Martinique	Fort-de-France	Martinique Aimé Césaire International Airport		
Mauritius	Port Louis	Sir Seewoosagur Ramgoolam International Airport		
Mayotte	Dzaoudzi	Dzaoudzi–Pamandzi International Airport		
Mexico	Cancún	Cancún International Airport	Terminated	
New Caledonia	Nouméa	La Tontouta International Airport	Terminated	
Puerto Rico	San Juan	Luis Muñoz Marín International Airport	Terminated	
Réunion	Saint-Denis	Roland Garros Airport		
Senegal	Dakar	Blaise Diagne International Airport	Terminated	
Senegal	Dakar	Léopold Sédar Senghor International Airport	Terminated	
Sint Maarten	Philipsburg	Princess Juliana International Airport	Terminated	
Thailand	Bangkok	Suvarnabhumi Airport	Terminated	
United States	Los Angeles	Los Angeles International Airport	Terminated	
United States	Miami	Miami International Airport	Terminated	
United States	New York City	John F. Kennedy International Airport	Terminated	
United States	Oakland	Oakland International Airport	Terminated	
United States	San Francisco	San Francisco International Airport	Terminated	

=== Airline partnerships ===
Corsair International has interlining agreements with the following airlines:

- Air Antilles
- Emirates
- ITA Airways
- Winair

The airline also partners with easyJet through its Worldwide by easyJet program, and additionally has codeshare agreements with the SNCF, the French national railway operator.

== Fleet ==
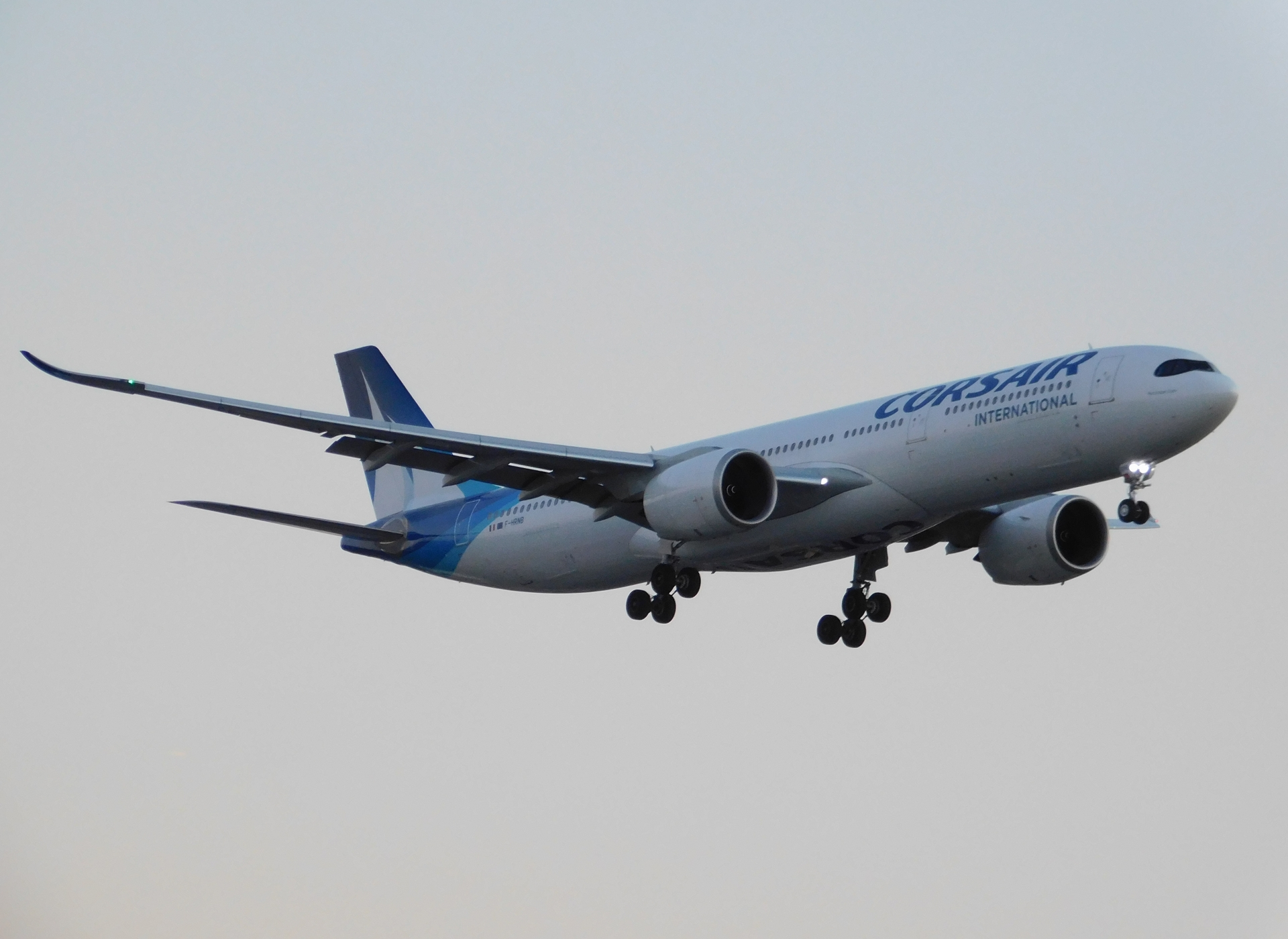
Airbus A330-900

=== Current fleet ===
As of July 2026, Corsair operates the following aircraft:

Corsair International fleet
Aircraft	In service	Orders	Passengers					Notes
Aircraft	In service	Orders	J	C	Y+	Y	Total	Notes
Airbus A330-900neo	9	—	20	21	33	278	352	
Total	9	–						

=== Former fleet ===
As of November 2025, Corsair International operated 9 Airbus A330-900neo

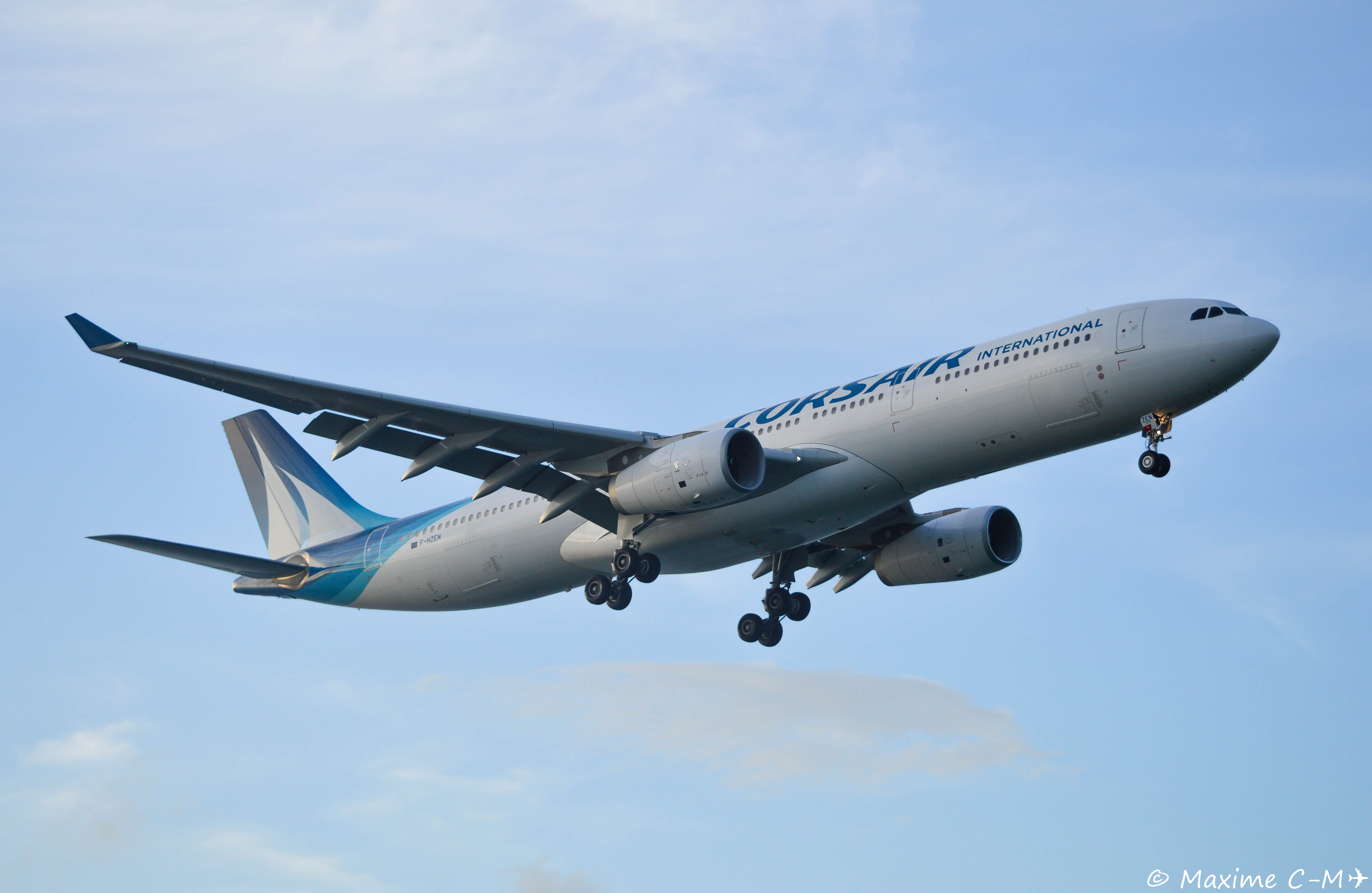
Airbus A330-300

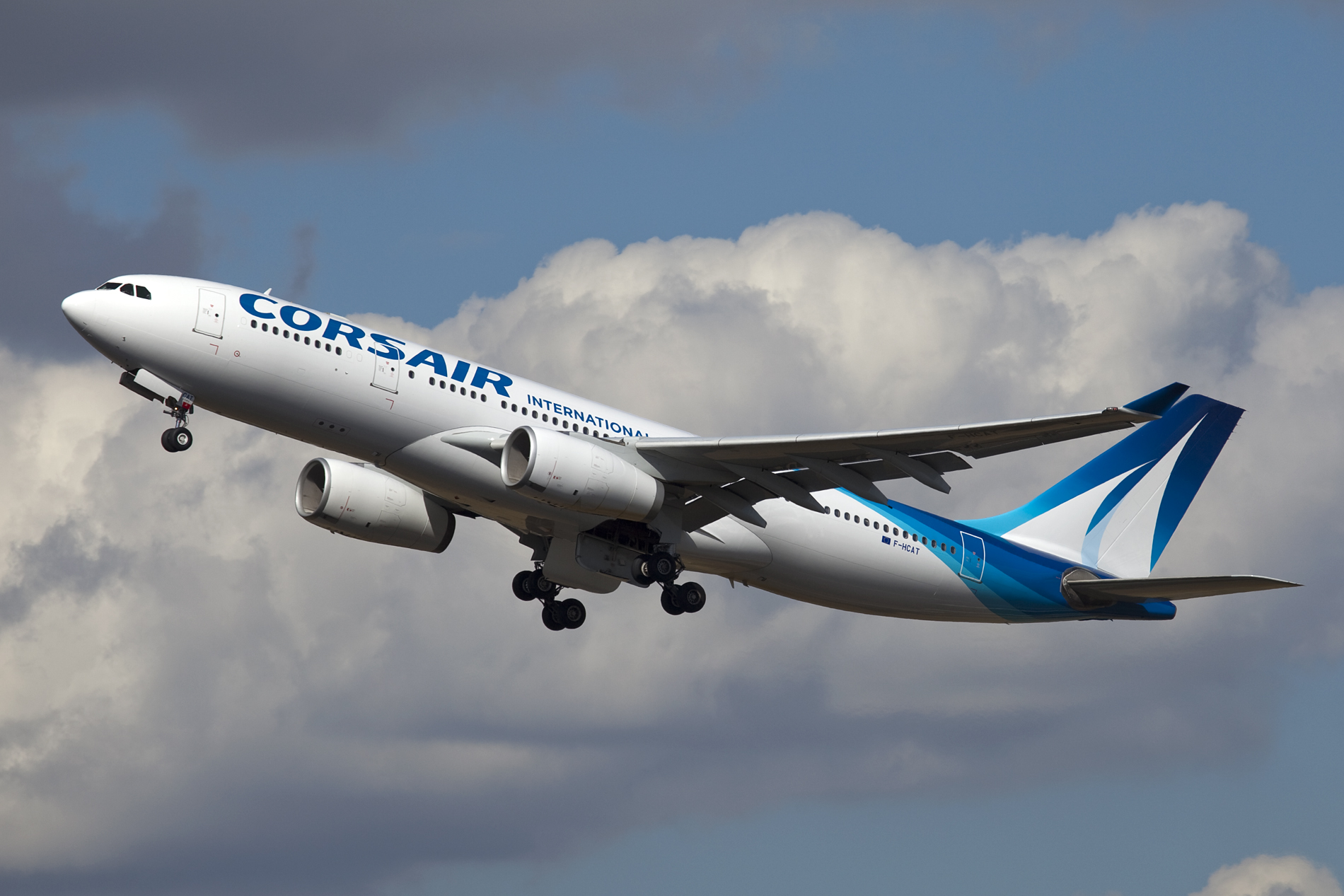
Airbus A330-200

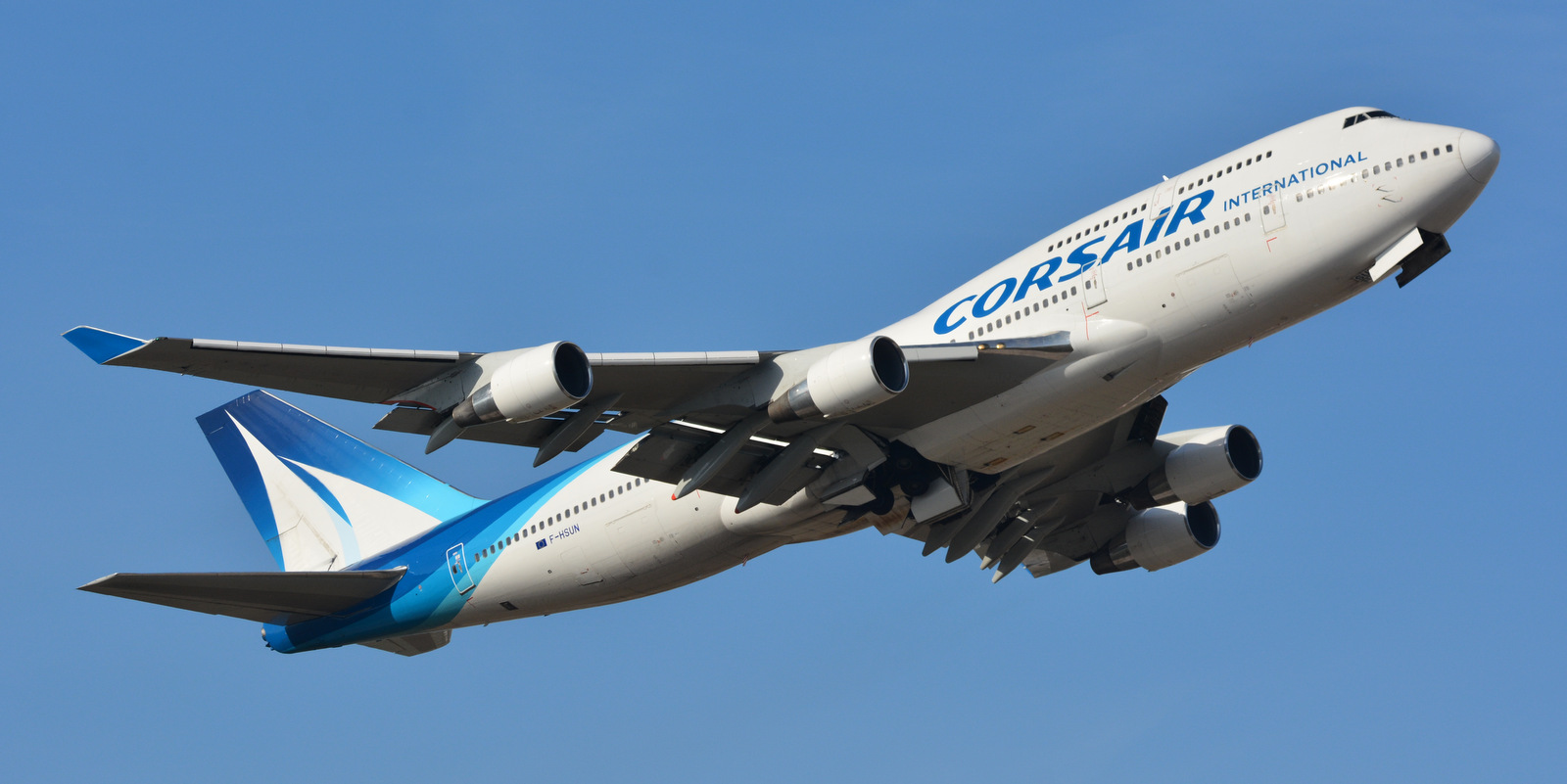
Boeing 747-400

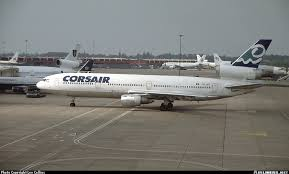
Leased Douglas DC-10-30

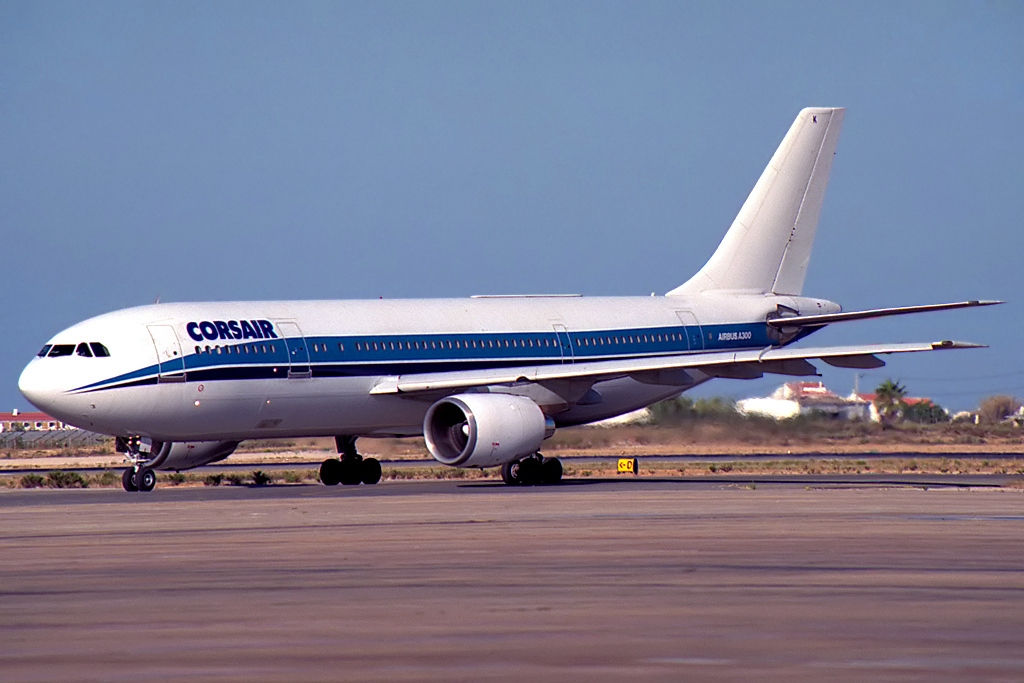
Leased Airbus A300B4

While the company started in business as an operator of short- and medium range aircraft such as the Sud Aviation Caravelle and various versions of the Boeing 737, beginning in the 1990s, it progressively shifted its operations to long-range only. As a long-range airline, Corsair has operated the following jet aircraft types:

Corsair International former fleet
Aircraft	Total	Introduced	Retired	Notes
Airbus A300B4	1	1995	1995	Leased from Premiair
Airbus A310-300	1	2004	2005	Leased from Islandsflug
Airbus A330-200	3	1999	2022	
Airbus A330-300	4	2012	2025	
Airbus A340-300	1	2017	2017	Leased from Hi Fly Malta
Airbus A340-300	1	2018	2018	Leased from Hi Fly Malta
Beechcraft King Air	1	1988	1994	
Boeing 737-200	2	1995	2000	
Boeing 737-300	3	1987	2004	
Boeing 737-400	3	1992	2006	
Boeing 747-100	5	1991	1998	
Boeing 747-200B	1	1988	1989	Leased from Iberia
Boeing 747-200B	5	1992	2005	
Boeing 747-300	6	1997	2007	
Boeing 747-400	6	2005	2020	
Boeing 747SP	1	1996	2002	Preserved at Châteauroux since September 2002
Boeing 767-300ER	1	2003	2003	Leased from Britannia Airways
McDonnell Douglas DC-10-30	2	1996	1997	Leased from ChallengAir
Sud Aviation Caravelle	5	1981	1987	

== See also ==
- List of airlines of France
