= Argent (surname) =

Argent is a surname of unclear origin. It may be from the Old French word for silver, a nickname surname for a metalworker or a person with grey hair, or a topographical surname for someone living near a silver mine. Several French towns are called 'Argent', towns which are near silver mines.

== Notables with this name include ==
- Douglas Argent (1921–2010), English television producer and director
- Edward Argent (1898–1968), English cricketer
- James Argent (born 1987), English television personality
- Maurice Argent (1916–1981), American actor
- Argent (Middlesex cricketer)
- Rod Argent (born 1945), British rock musician
- Allison Argent, a fictional character in the TV series Teen Wolf and Teen Wolf: The Movie
