= Money, Money, Money (disambiguation) =

"Money, Money, Money" is a song by ABBA.

Money, Money, Money may also refer to:

- Money, Money, Money (film), a 1923 film directed by Tom Forman
- "Money Money Money" (Kevin Ayers song), 1980

== See also ==
- Money (disambiguation)
- Money Money (disambiguation)
- "Money Money Money Money", the opening lyrics to "For the Love of Money", a 1974 song by The O'Jays
- Money Money, More Money, 2011 Indian Telugu-language comedy film, third installment in the Money film series
