= Sinnamary Aerodrome =

Airport in French Guiana, South America

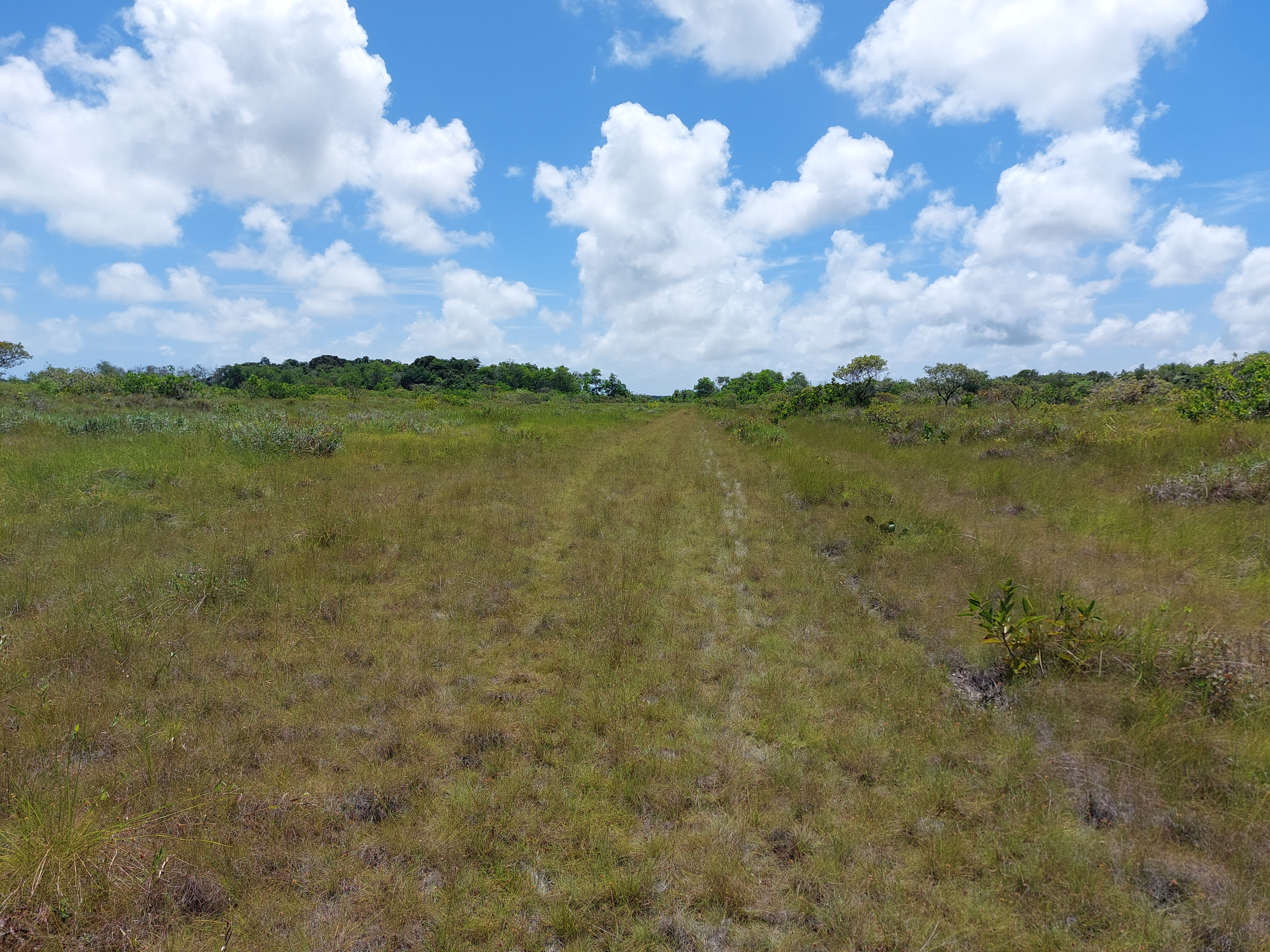
- Runway still visible in 2022.
- IATA: none; ICAO: SOOY

Summary
- Serves: Sinnamary, French Guiana
- Opened: 11 February 1964
- Closed: 3 July 1991
- Elevation AMSL: 33 ft / 10 m
- Coordinates: 5°22′25″N 52°56′45″W

Map
- Location in French Guiana

Runways
| Direction | Length | | Surface |
| Direction | m | ft | Surface |
|---|---|---|---|
| 11/29 | 500 | 1,640 | Grass |

Sinnamary Aerodrome (IATA: SOOY) is a former aerodrome serving Sinnamary, a commune of French Guiana on the Sinnamary River, 6 kilometres (3.7 mi) in from the Caribbean coast. The runway is just east of the town. It was open in 1964 and closed in 1991.

== See also ==
- List of airports in French Guiana
- Transport in French Guiana
