= Camopi Airport =

Airport in French Guiana, South America

- IATA: OYC; ICAO: SOOC; LID: GF-0004

Summary
- Airport type: Public
- Serves: Camopi, French Guiana
- Elevation AMSL: 237 ft / 72 m
- Coordinates: 3°10′20″N 52°20′10″W

Map
- Location of the airport in French Guiana

Runways
| Direction | Length | | Surface |
| Direction | m | ft | Surface |
|---|---|---|---|
| 11/29 | 1,000 | 3,281 | Concrete |
- Sources: OurAirports Bing Maps

Camopi Airport (sometimes called Vila Brasil Airport) is an airport serving the Oyapock river village of Camopi, French Guiana near the border with Brazil.

The airport is at the confluence of the Camopi into the Oyapock, adjacent to the Camopi encampment of the 3rd Foreign Infantry Regiment of the French Foreign Legion.

The Camopi non-directional beacon (Ident: CP) is located just south of the runway.

In October 2020, the airport was upgraded for regular passenger transport. The airport opened for regular service in April 2021.

== Airlines and destinations ==
| Airlines | Destinations |
|---|---|
| Guyane Express Fly | Cayenne |

== See also ==
- Transport in French Guiana
- List of airports in French Guiana
