= Money (nickname) =

As a nickname, Money may refer to:

- Money Hunter (born 1995), American football player
- Money Johnson (1918–1978), American jazz trumpeter
- Money Mark (born 1960), American producer and musician, best known for collaborations with the Beastie Boys
- Floyd Mayweather Jr. (born 1977), American professional boxer and promoter
- Bill Monroe (1900s infielder) (c. 1877–1915), an African-American baseball player in the Negro leagues
- Jeff Wilkins (born 1972), a former National Football League placekicker

== See also ==
- Money (disambiguation)
- Money (surname)
