= Air Antilles =

Airline of Guadeloupe

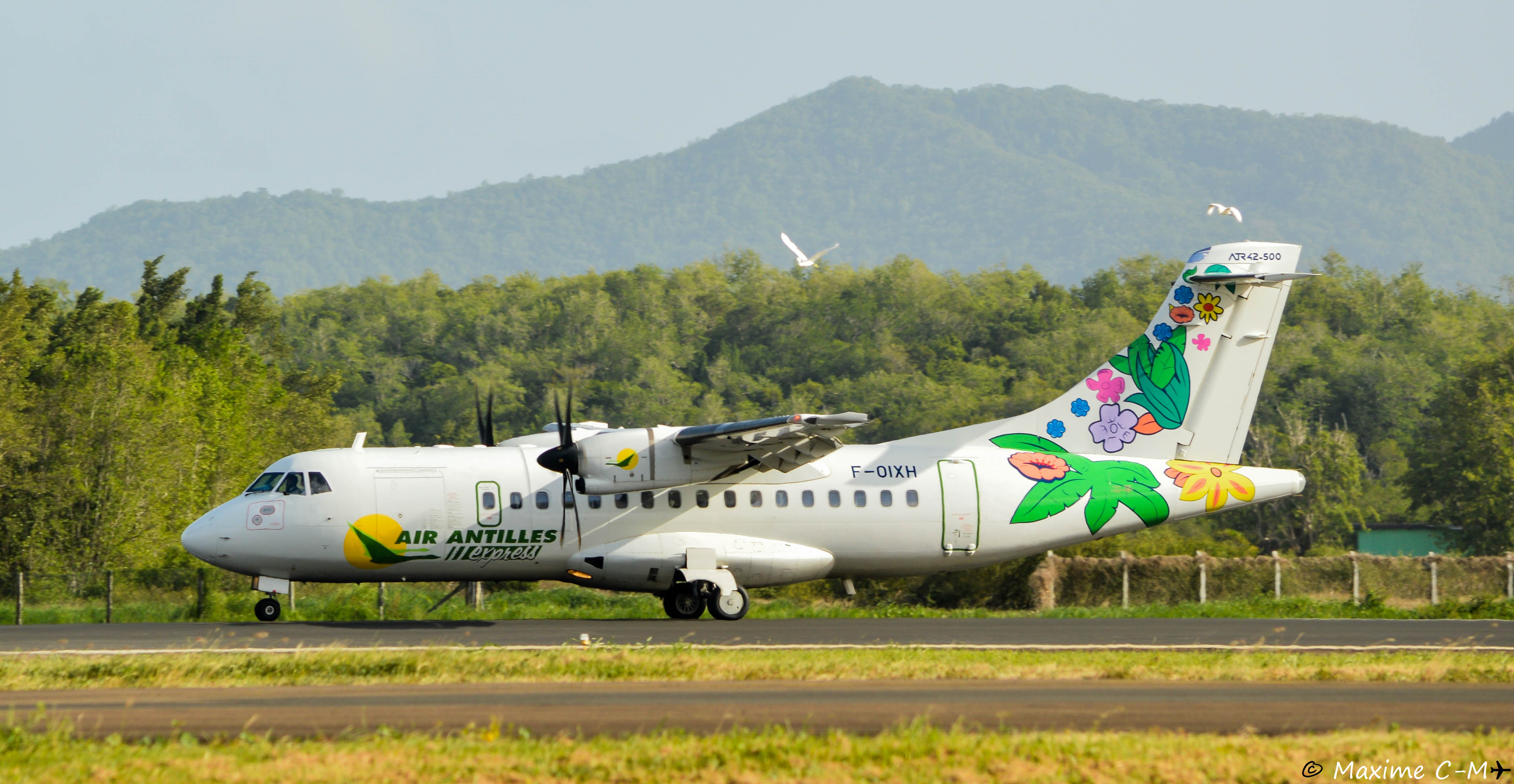
IATA	ICAO	Call sign
4I	KES	KARIBEES
- Founded: 18 December 2002; 23 years ago
- Ceased operations: 27 April 2026; 3 months ago
- Hubs: Pointe-à-Pitre International Airport
- Frequent-flyer program: GREEN'Smiles
- Fleet size: 3
- Destinations: 4
- Parent company: Collectivity of Saint Martin (60%) and EDEIS (40%)
- Headquarters: Pointe-à-Pitre, Guadeloupe
- Website: www.airantilles.com

Air Antilles was a French regional airline based at Pointe-à-Pitre International Airport in Guadeloupe. It operated scheduled and seasonal services throughout the French Antilles.

On 10 December 2025, it was reported that the French civil aviation authority had suspended the air operator certificate (AOC) of Air Antilles on safety grounds after an audit. On 4 February 2026, it was reported that the airline had entered a six month restructuring. The decision was made on 2 February 2026, and will be led by the Commercial Court of Pointe-à-Pitre. On 27 April 2026, the airline ceased all operations indefinitely following the decision of the Commercial Court of Pointe-à-Pitre to place the carrier into judicial liquidation.

== History ==
The airline began operations as Air Antilles Express on December 18, 2002, owned by Air Guyane Express, which itself used to be a subsidiary of Guadeloupean group CAIRE. It was a brand name for Air Guyane's Caribbean operations and both airlines share their call sign, IATA and ICAO codes. The airline uses as its Airline Reservations System Zenith, developed by Travel Technology Interactive, a French-based company.

In 2016, the airline changed its name to Air Antilles and introduced a new livery with the delivery of its first ATR 72-600.

In September 2023, the group CAIRE, of which both Air Antilles and Air Guyane were a part, was terminated. Air Antilles was set to be revived by a public-private partnership, while Air Guyane was to be liquidated. Air Antilles resumed operations on July 22, 2024, with reduced service and fleet size.

== Destinations ==
Country	City	Airport	Notes	Refs
Antigua and Barbuda	Osbourn	V. C. Bird International Airport	Suspended	
Barbados	Bridgetown	Grantley Adams International Airport	Suspended	
Dominica	Marigot	Douglas–Charles Airport	Suspended	
Dominica	Roseau	Canefield Airport	Suspended	
Dominican Republic	Punta Cana	Punta Cana International Airport	Suspended	
Dominican Republic	Santo Domingo	Las Américas International Airport	Suspended	
Guadeloupe	Pointe-à-Pitre	Pointe-à-Pitre International Airport	Hub	
Martinique	Fort-de-France	Martinique Aimé Césaire International Airport		
Puerto Rico	San Juan	Luis Muñoz Marín International Airport	Suspended	
Saint Barthélemy	Saint-Jean	Gustaf III Airport		
Saint Lucia	Castries	George F.L. Charles Airport	Suspended	
Saint Martin	Grand Case	L'Espérance Airport		
Sint Maarten	Philipsburg	Princess Juliana International Airport	Suspended	

=== Codeshare agreements ===
- Air Caraibes
- Air France
- Winair

=== Interline agreements ===
- Corsair International

== Fleet ==
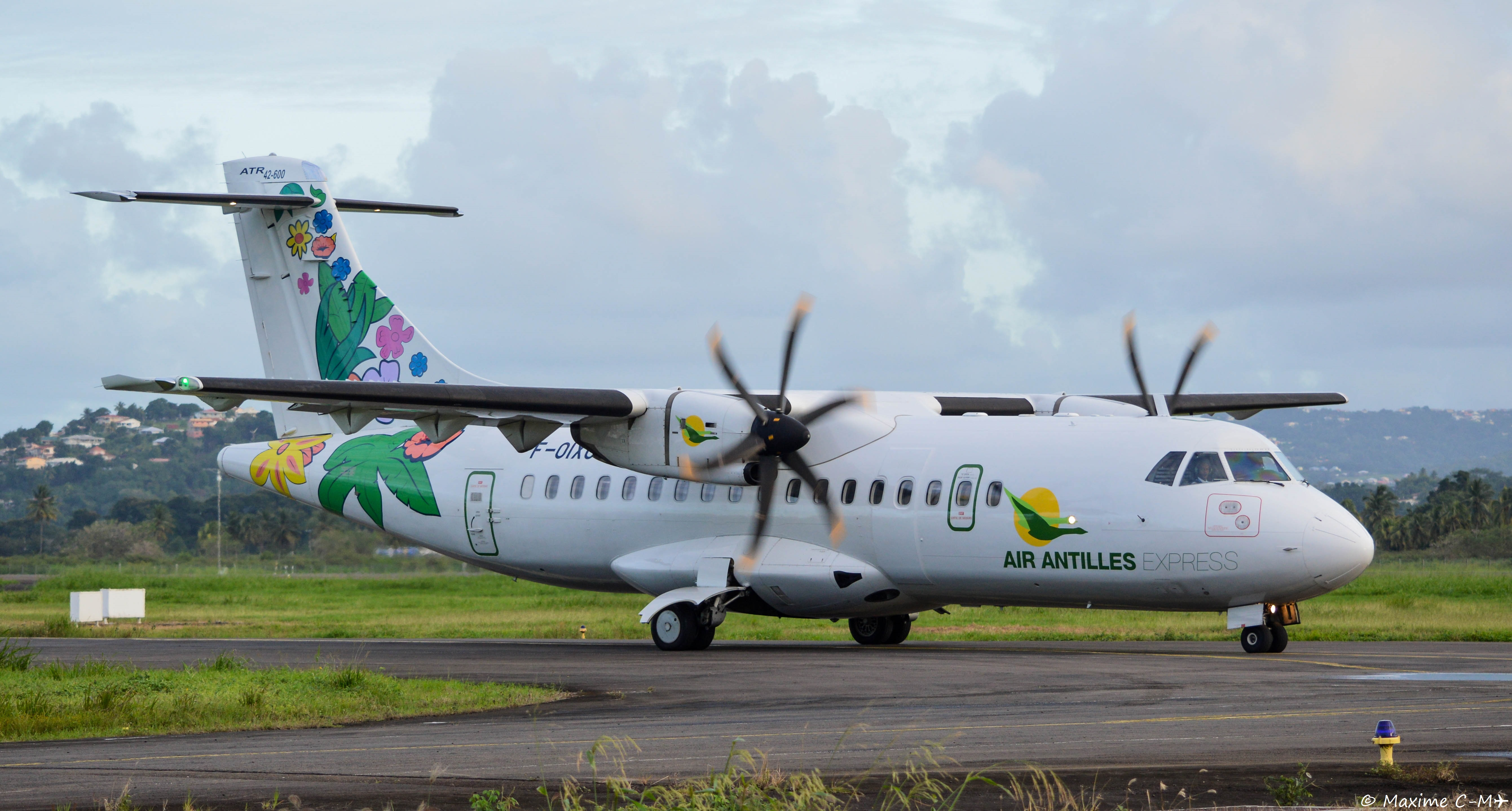
Air Antilles ATR 42-600

As of August 2025, Air Antilles operates the following aircraft:

Air Antilles fleet
Aircraft	In service	Passengers	Notes
ATR 72-600	2	72	
Viking DHC-6-400 Twin Otter	1	19	
Total	3		

== Accidents and incidents ==
- On August 24, 2023, Air Antilles flight 3S722 (operated by a DHC-6-400 Twin Otter registered F-OMYS) off runway 28 at the Saint Barthélemy airport moments after touchdown. The Twin Otter struck a parked and unoccupied helicopter that had landed 30 minutes prior. While none of the six on board were injured, the Twin Otter was seriously damaged, the high-speed impact caused substantial damage to both aircraft. The pilots blamed the loss of directional control on a steering issue. Furthermore, video evidence shows the aircraft having steering difficulties while taxiing at Saint Barth only ten days prior to the crash. Air Antilles was temporarily suspended from flying to Saint Barth following the accident.

== See also ==
- List of airlines of the Americas
