= Edward Argent =

English cricketer

Personal information
- Full name: Edward Arthur Argent
- Born: 6 February 1898; Wandsworth, London
- Died: 20 July 1968 (aged 70); Horsham, Sussex
- Batting: Right-handed
- Bowling: Right-arm off-break

Career statistics
| Competition | First-class |
|---|---|
| Matches | 2 |
| Runs scored | 22 |
| Batting average | 7.33 |
| 100s/50s | 0/0 |
| Top score | 19 |
| Balls bowled | 78 |
| Wickets | 0 |
| Bowling average | – |
| 5 wickets in innings | – |
| 10 wickets in match | – |
| Best bowling | – |
| Catches/stumpings | 0/– |
- Source: Cricinfo, 14 April 2023

Edward Arthur Argent (6 February 1898 – 20 July 1968) was an English cricketer who played two first-class matches, both for Worcestershire in the space of a few days in 1928. He had very little success, taking no wickets from a total of 13 overs and making scores of 3, 0 and 19 with the bat.

Argent was born in Wandsworth, London; he died aged 70 in Horsham, Sussex.
