= Maripasoula Airport =

Airport in French Guiana, South America

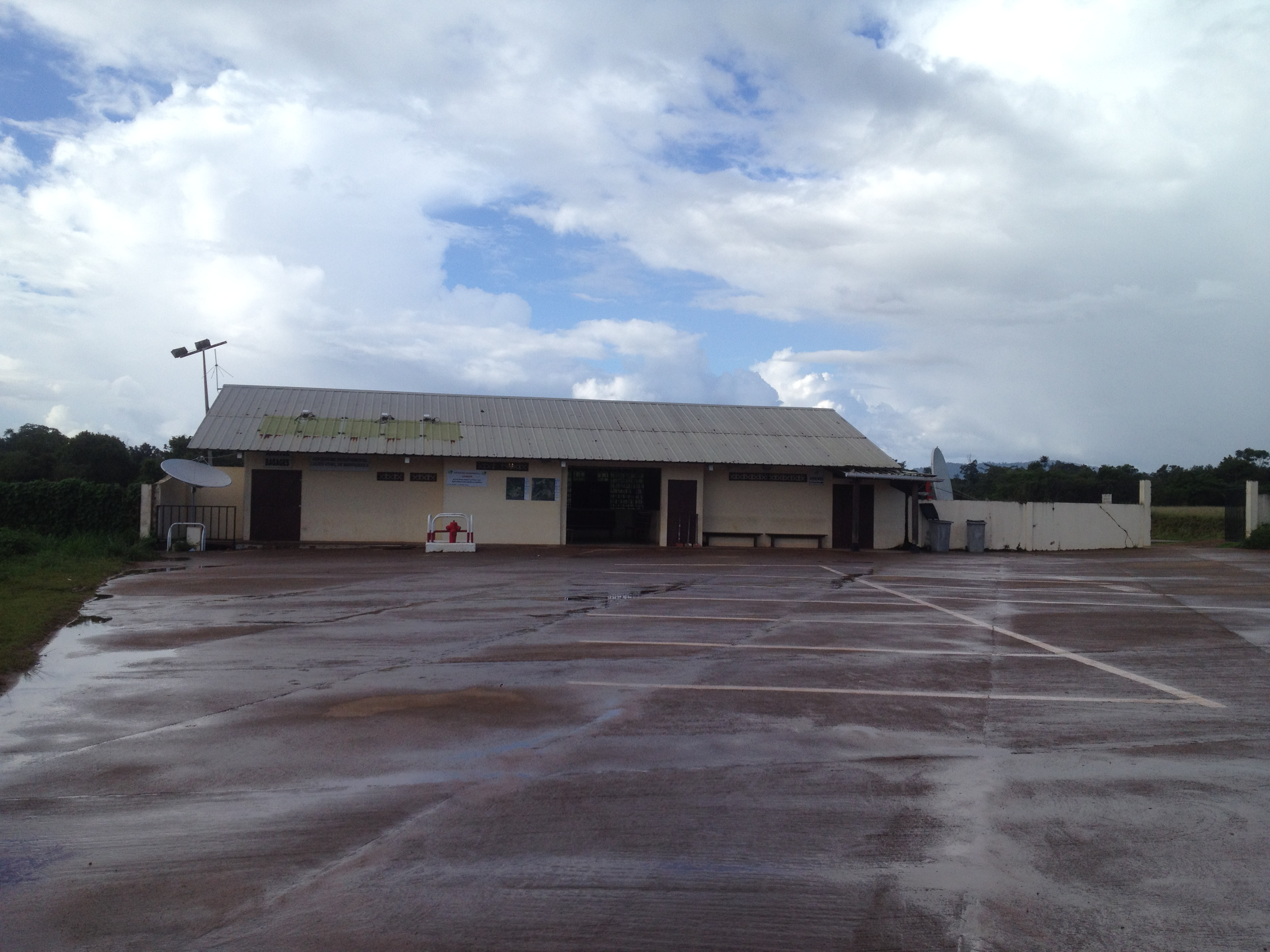
- Maripasoula airport
- IATA: MPY; ICAO: SOOA

Summary
- Airport type: Public
- Operator: Conseil Général de la Guyane
- Serves: Maripasoula, French Guiana
- Elevation AMSL: 377 ft / 115 m
- Coordinates: 3°39′27″N 54°02′14″W

Map
- Location of airport in French Guiana

Runways
Direction	Length		Surface
Direction	m	ft	Surface
07/25	1,200	3,937	Concrete
- Sources: GCM Google Maps

Maripasoula Airport (IATA: MPY, ICAO: SOOA) is an airport 3.5 km (1.9 NM) north of Maripasoula, a commune in the arrondissement of Saint-Laurent-du-Maroni in French Guiana. It is near the Lawa River, which forms the border between French Guiana and Suriname.

The Maripasoula non-directional beacon (Ident: MP) is located on the field.

== Airlines and destinations ==
Airlines	Destinations
Guyane Express Fly	Cayenne, Grand Santi, Saint-Laurent du Maroni, Saül

== See also ==
- List of airports in French Guiana
- Transport in French Guiana
