= Argenta (surname) =

Argenta is a surname. Notable people with the surname include:

- Ataúlfo Argenta (1913–1958), Spanish conductor and pianist
- Nancy Argenta (born 1957), Canadian opera singer
