= Saint-Georges-de-l'Oyapock Airport =

Airport in French Guiana, South America

St-Georges-de-l'Oyapock Airport
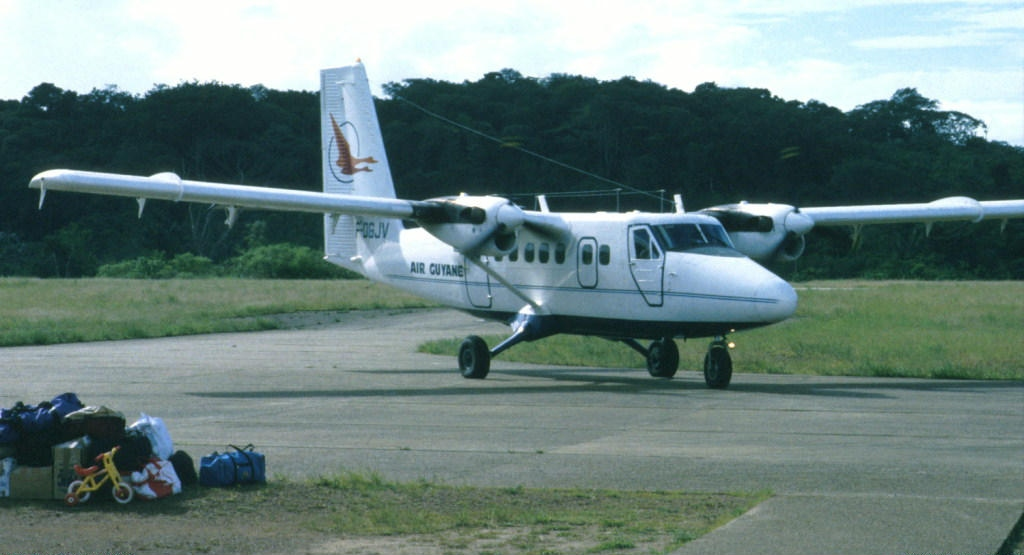
- De Havilland Canada DHC-6 Twin Otter of Air Guyane at Saint-Georges-de-l'Oyapock
- IATA: OYP; ICAO: SOOG

Summary
- Airport type: Public
- Operator: Conseil général de la Guyane
- Serves: St-Georges-de-l'Oyapock, French Guiana
- Elevation AMSL: 36 ft (11 m)
- Coordinates: 3°53′50″N 51°48′15″W

Map
- Location in French Guiana

Runways
Direction	Length		Surface
Direction	m	ft	Surface
04/22	1,200	3,937	Asphalt
- Sources: WAD GCM Google Maps

Saint-Georges-de-l'Oyapock Airport (IATA: OYP, ICAO: SOOG) is an airport serving Saint-Georges (also known as Saint-Georges-de-l'Oyapock) in French Guiana. Saint-Georges lies on the Oyapock River, which forms the border between French Guiana and Brazil.

The Saint Georges non-directional beacon (Ident: GOP) is located on the field.

== See also ==
- List of airports in French Guiana
- Transport in French Guiana
