= L'Argent (disambiguation) =

L'Argent is a novel by Émile Zola.

L'Argent may also refer to:

- L'Argent (1928 film), a silent film by Marcel L'Herbier
- L'Argent (1936 film), a film starring Véra Korène
- L'Argent (1983 film), a film by Robert Bresson
- L'Argent (1988 film), a film for TV directed by Jacques Rouffio

== See also ==
- Argent (disambiguation)
