= List of airlines of New Caledonia =

This is a list of airlines currently operating in New Caledonia.

Airline	Image	IATA	ICAO	Callsign	Commenced operations	Notes
Air Calédonie		TY	TPC	AIRCAL	1954	
Aircalin		SB	ACI	AIRCALIN	1983	
Air Oceania			VZR		2003	

== See also ==
- List of airlines
- List of defunct airlines of Oceania
