= Cayenne – Félix Eboué Airport =

International airport serving French Guiana

Cayenne – Félix Éboué Airport formerly Rochambeau Airport
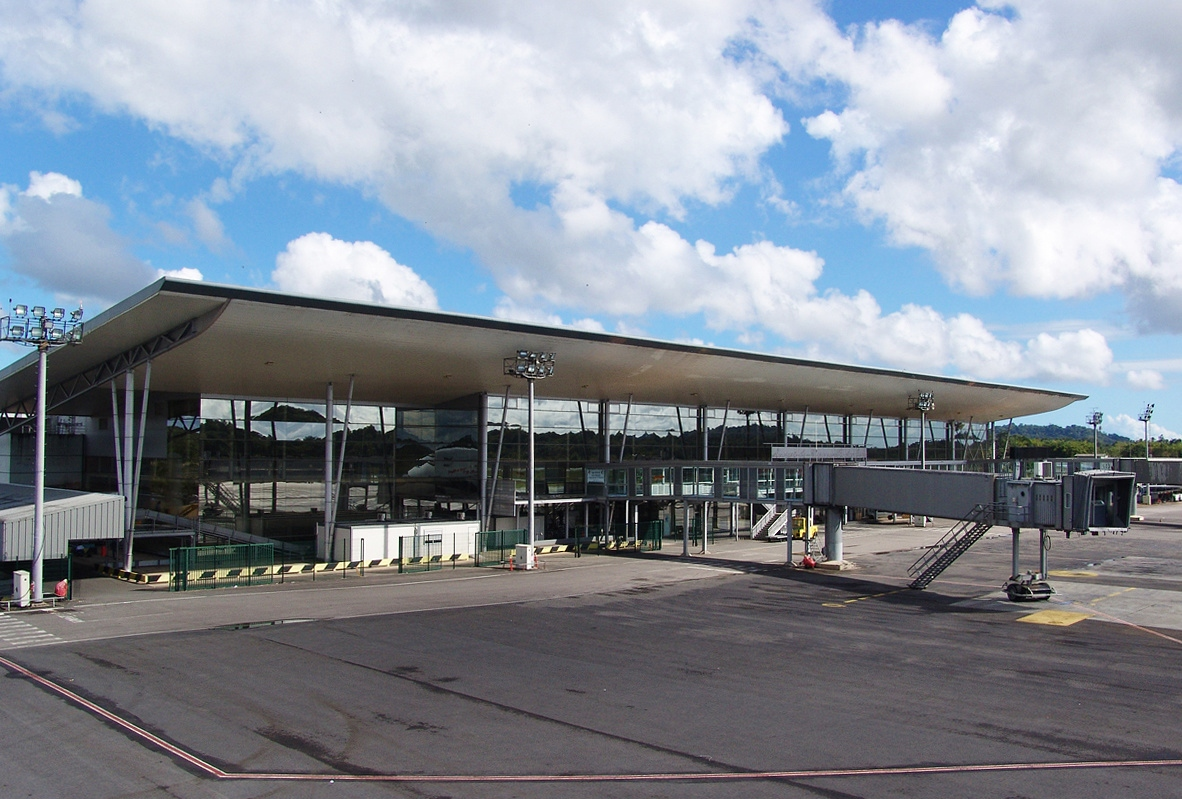
- IATA: CAY; ICAO: SOCA

Summary
- Airport type: Public
- Operator: Chamber of Commerce and Industry of Guiana
- Serves: Cayenne, French Guiana
- Location: Matoury, French Guiana
- Elevation AMSL: 26 ft (7.9 m)
- Coordinates: 04°49′11″N 52°21′43″W
- Website: guyane.aeroport.fr

Map
- Location in French Guiana

Runways
Direction	Length		Surface
Direction	m	ft	Surface
08/26	3,205	10,515	Asphalt

Statistics (2023)
- Passengers: 481,961
- Passenger traffic change: ▼1.4%
- Aircraft movements: 5,265
- Aircraft movements change: ▼20.2%
- Source : Aeroport.fr, French AIP, UAF, DAFIF

Cayenne – Félix Éboué Airport (French: Aéroport de Cayenne – Félix Éboué, IATA: CAY, ICAO: SOCA) is French Guiana's main international airport. It is located near the commune of Matoury, 13 kilometres (8 mi) southwest of French Guiana's capital city of Cayenne. It is managed by the Chamber of Commerce and Industry of French Guiana (CCI Guyane).

== History ==
The first airfield at Cayenne, called "Gallion," was built in 1943 in ten months by the U.S. Army Air Corps as a base allowing bombers to reach Africa. Though quickly abandoned upon the completion of the new airport, it can still be found very close to the aerodrome.

The new airport was first given the name "Rochambeau" in reference to Jean-Baptiste Donatien de Vimeur, comte de Rochambeau, commander-in-chief of the French troops in the American Revolutionary War. It was purchased by France in 1949.

This name was controversial because the airport's namesake's son, Donatien-Marie-Joseph de Vimeur, vicomte de Rochambeau, harshly repressed the Haitian Revolution during the Saint-Domingue expedition. Christiane Taubira, then-Member of the National Assembly of France for Guiana, requested in 1999 that the name be changed. Multiple proposals were submitted, including Cépérou, a seventeenth-century indigenous chief. It was finally renamed Félix Éboué Airport in 2012, the change becoming official in January of that year. The code for the airport remains CAY.

Félix Eboué Airport serves approximately 400,000 passengers per year.

Cayenne-Rochambeau Air Base 367 is co-located with Félix-Eboué Airport. Very close to this airfield is the former "Gallion" airfield, used in 1943 and then quickly abandoned when the new airport was used.

It is classified SSLIA in category 7 (classification A).

Traffic at Cayenne-Félix-Eboué airport stood at 558,889 passengers in 2019, an increase of 8.8% since 2016. In 2022 it stood at 488,721 passengers, an increase since the health crisis.

Its management is ensured by the Chamber of Commerce and Industry of French Guiana.

== Facilities ==
The airport has an elevation of 24 feet (7 m) above mean sea level. It has one paved runway. It is open to public air traffic and international air traffic.

== Airlines and destinations ==
Airlines	Destinations
Air Caraïbes	Paris–Orly
Air France	Belém, Fortaleza, Fort-de-France, Paris–Charles de Gaulle, Pointe-à-Pitre
Guyane Express Fly	Camopi, Grand Santi, Maripasoula, Saint-Laurent du Maroni, Saül

== Statistics ==
Passengers
2000	2005	2006	2007	2008	2009	2010	2011	2012
457 168	375 844	374 394	386 979	385 142	400 025	423 849	435 440	495 994

== See also ==
- Transport in French Guiana
- List of airports in French Guiana
