= List of airlines of Saint Pierre and Miquelon =

This is a list of airlines currently operating in Saint Pierre and Miquelon.

Airline	Image	IATA	ICAO	Callsign	Commenced operations	Notes
Air Saint-Pierre		PJ	SPM	SAINT-PIERRE	1965	

== See also ==
- List of airlines
