= Grand-Santi Airport =

Airport in French Guiana, South America

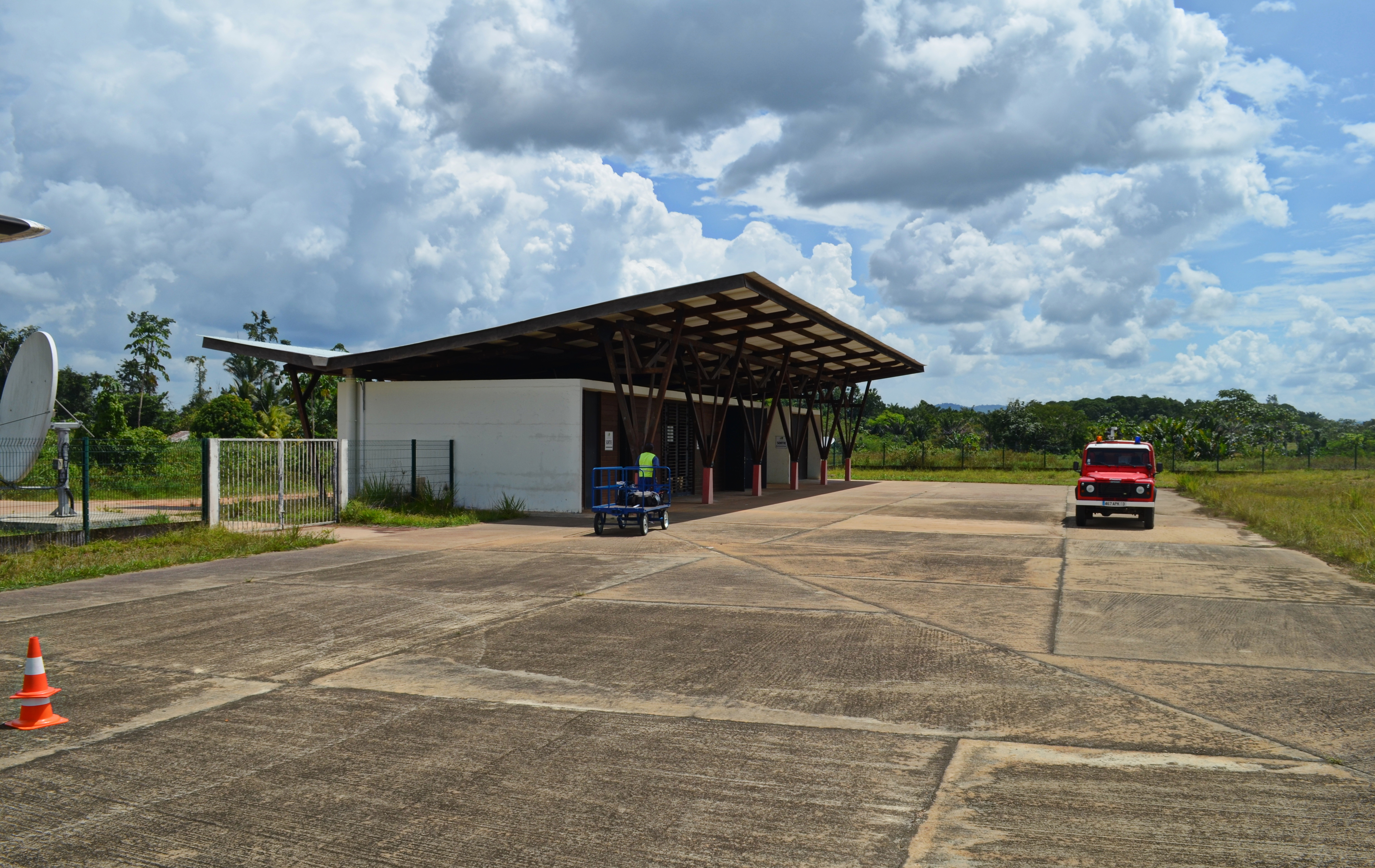
- Terminal at Grand-Santi
- IATA: GSI; ICAO: SOGS

Summary
- Operator: Conseil Général de la Guyane
- Serves: Grand-Santi, French Guiana
- Elevation AMSL: 185 ft / 56 m
- Coordinates: 4°17′05″N 54°22′40″W

Map
- Location of airport in French Guiana

Runways
Direction	Length		Surface
Direction	m	ft	Surface
09/27	1,000	3,281	Concrete
- Source: SkyVector Google Maps

Grand-Santi Airport (IATA: GSI, ICAO: SOGS) is an airport serving the Lawa River port of Grand-Santi, a commune of French Guiana. The airport is 1 kilometre (0.62 mi) east of the river, which forms the border with Suriname.

== Airlines and destinations ==
Airlines	Destinations
Guyane Express Fly	Cayenne, Maripasoula, Saint-Laurent du Maroni

== See also ==
- List of airports in French Guiana
- Transport in French Guiana
