= Saül Airport =

Airport in French Guiana, South America

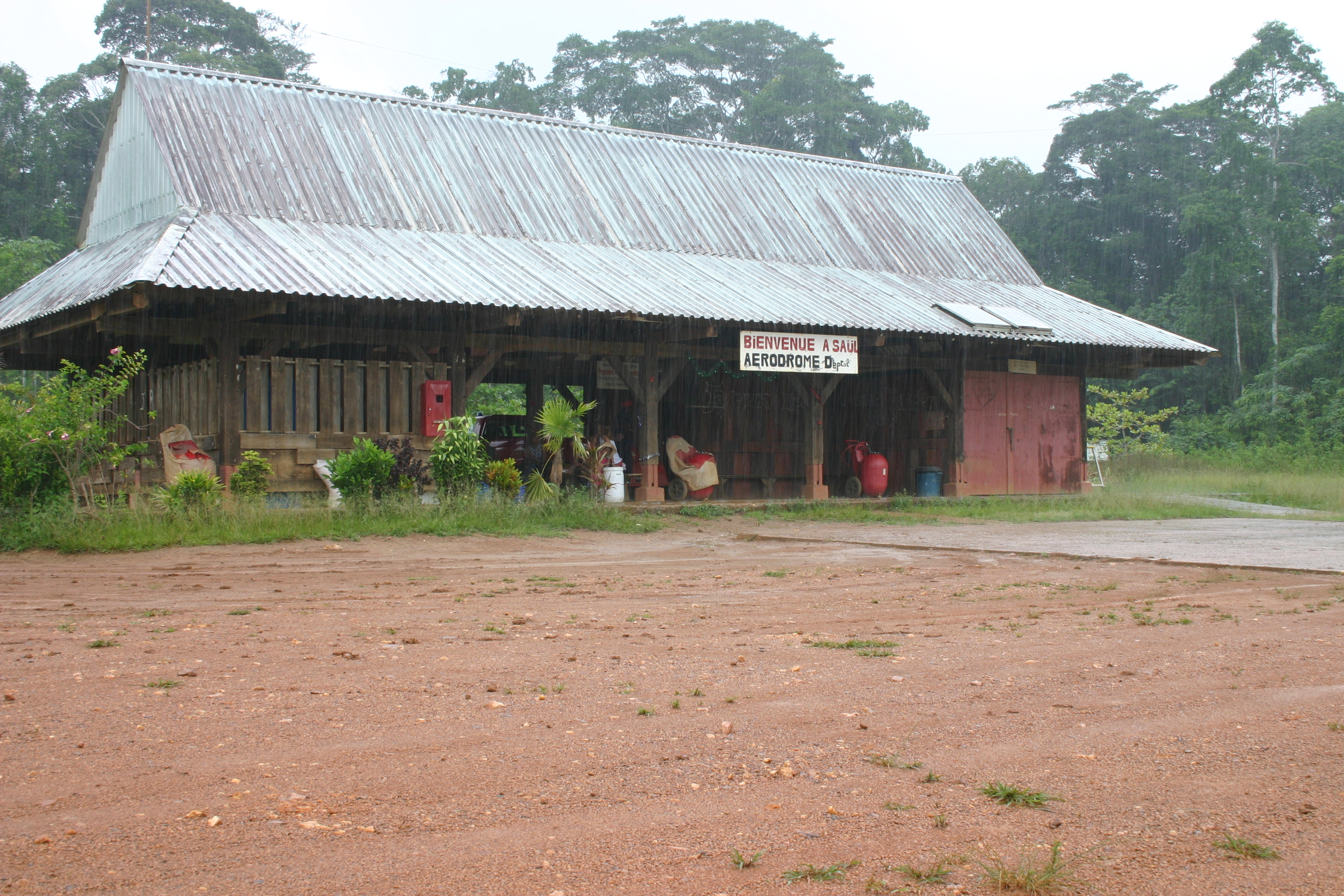
- Saül Airport's terminal building
- IATA: XAU; ICAO: SOOS

Summary
- Operator: Conseil Général de la Guyane
- Serves: Saül, French Guiana
- Elevation AMSL: 703 ft / 214 m
- Coordinates: 03°36′55″N 53°12′15″W

Map
- Location of airport in French Guiana

Runways
Direction	Length		Surface
Direction	m	ft	Surface
04/22	1,300	4,265	Dirt
- Source: GCM Google Maps

Saül Airport (IATA: XAU, ICAO: SOOS) is an airstrip serving Saül, a commune of French Guiana.

The airport is just southeast of the village. There are low hills west and northeast of the runway. The Saul non-directional beacon (Ident: SU) is located in the village.

== Airlines and destinations ==
Airlines	Destinations
Guyane Express Fly	Cayenne, Maripasoula

== See also ==
- List of airports in French Guiana
- Transport in French Guiana
