= Montagne d'Argent =

Hill in northeast French Guiana

- IUCN category IV (habitat/species management area)
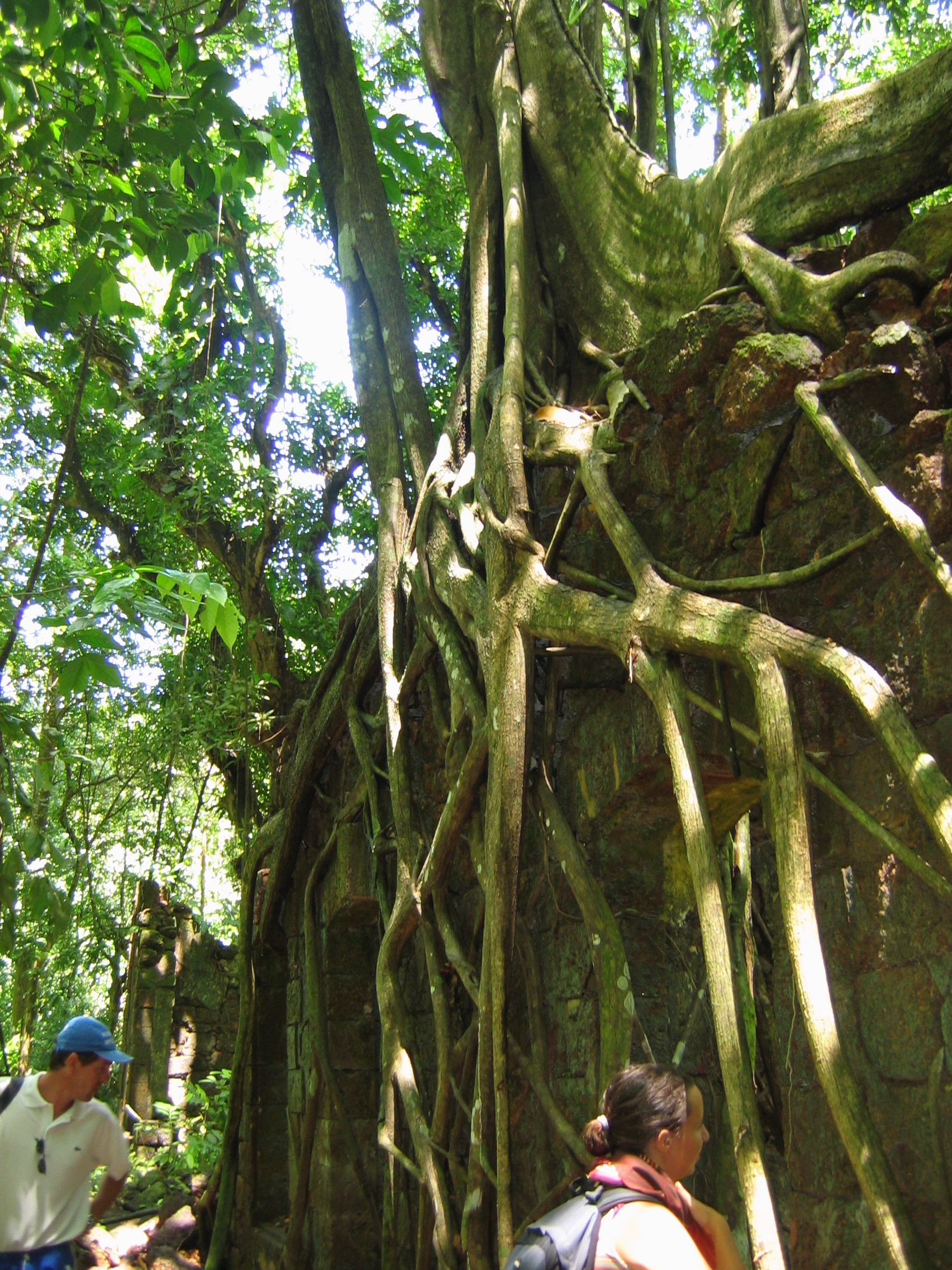
- Penal colony Montagne d'Argent

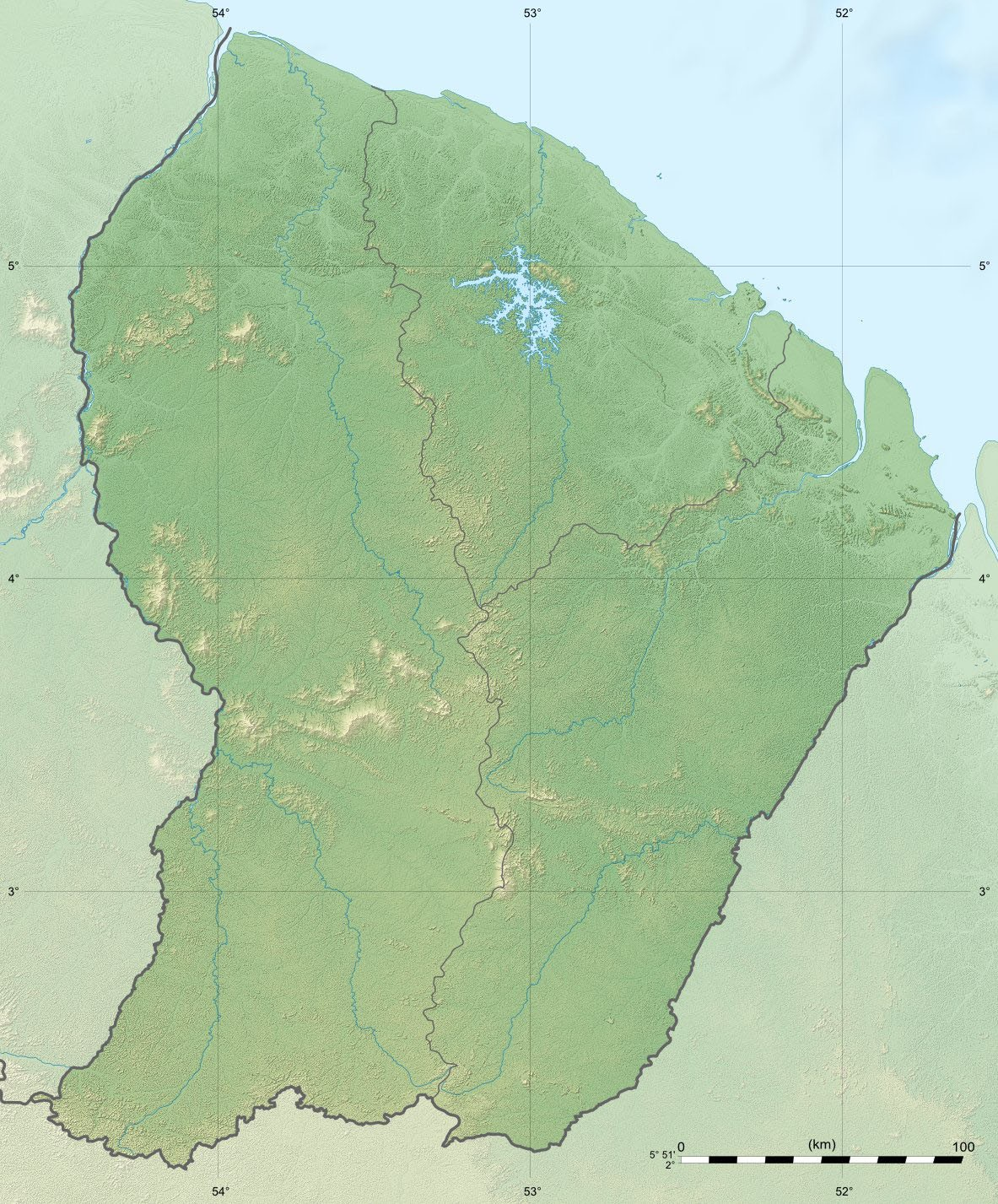
- Location within French Guiana
- Location: French Guiana
- Nearest city: Ouanary
- Coordinates: 4°23′31″N 51°41′45″W
- Area: 7.13 km^{2} (2.75 sq mi)
- Established: 1998
- Governing body: Conservatoire du littoral

The Montagne d'Argent or Monte Prata (meaning silver mountain) is a hill in northeast French Guiana, next to Pointe Béhague, on the estuary of the Oyapock River. In 1998, the mountain is protected by Conservatoire du littoral, because 22 petroglyphs had been discovered in the mountain. The hill rises to a height of 132 metres (433 ft).

In 1852, a penal colony was established on a former coffee plantation, and was the first agricultural penal colony. The colony was finally closed in 1910, and was an economic failure with many prisoners dying or becoming ill.
