= Ouanary =

Commune in French Guiana, France

- Commune
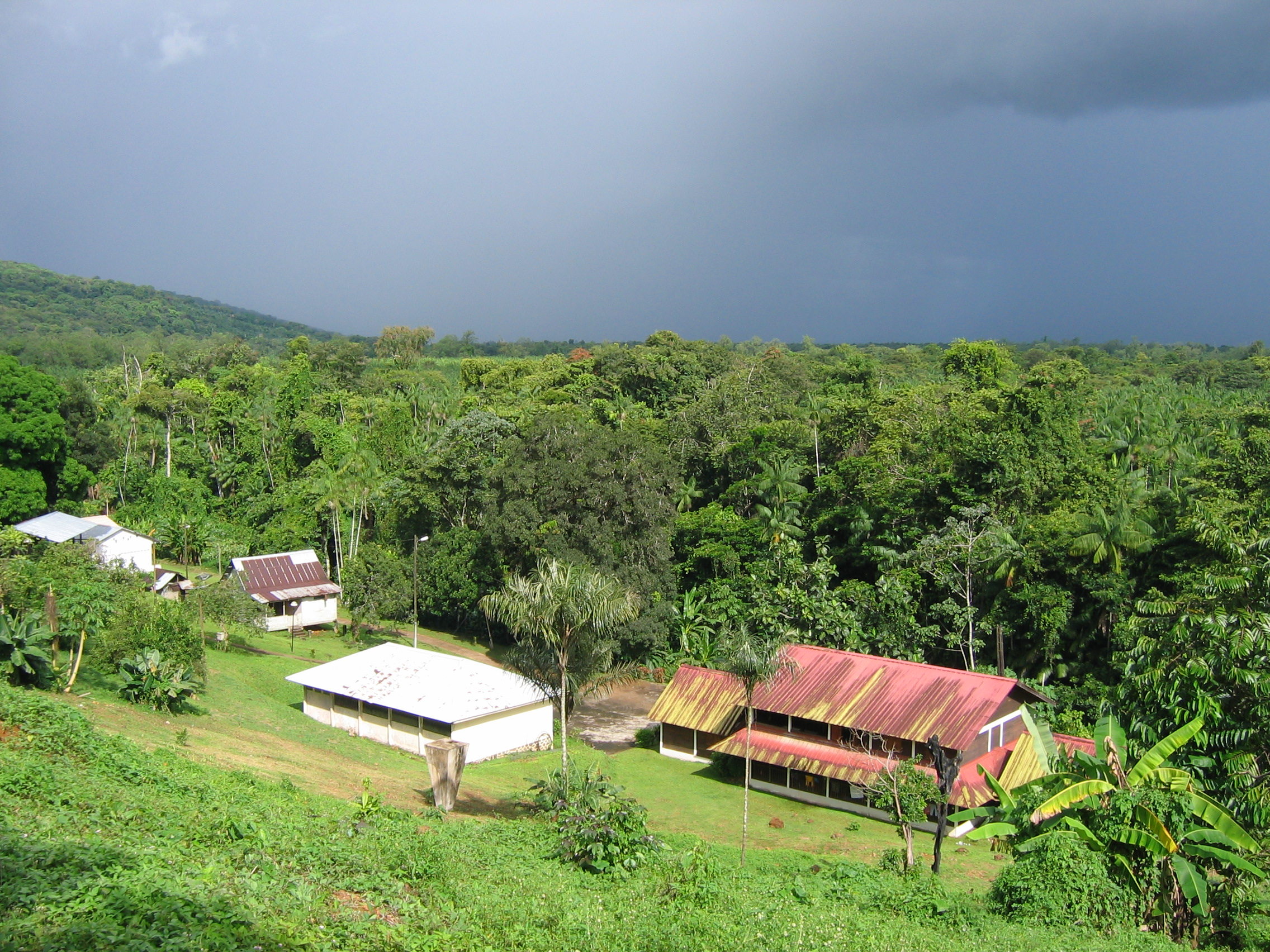
- An overview of Ouanary, from the farm track

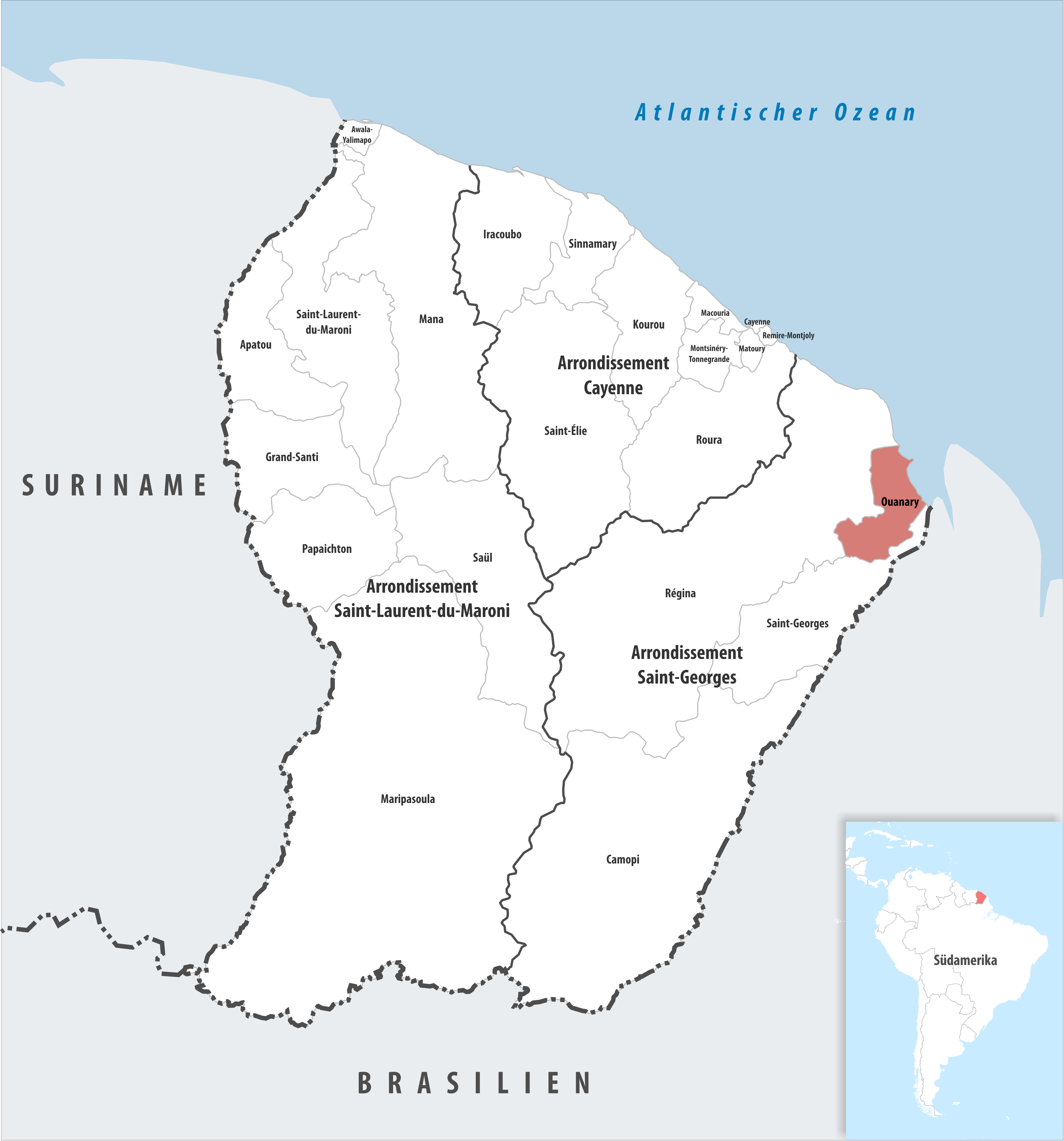
- Location of the commune (in red) within French Guiana
- Location of Ouanary
- Coordinates: 4°12′33″N 51°40′15″W
- Country: France
- Overseas region and department: French Guiana
- Arrondissement: Saint-Georges
- Intercommunality: Est Guyanais

Government
  - Mayor (2020–2026): Narcisse Rozé
- Area^{1}: 1,080 km^{2} (420 sq mi)
- Population (2023): 150
  - Density: 0.14/km^{2} (0.36/sq mi)
- Time zone: UTC−03:00
- INSEE/Postal code: 97314 /97380
- ^{1} French Land Register data, which excludes lakes, ponds, glaciers > 1 km^{2} (0.386 sq mi or 247 acres) and river estuaries.

Ouanary (French pronunciation: [wanaʁi]; French Guianese Creole: Wannari) is a commune of French Guiana, an overseas region and department of France located in South America. Ouanary lies at the mouth of the Oyapock river. It had a population of 150 people in 2023 and is the least populated commune of French Guiana. The settlement of Ouanary is accessible only by boat, or by small aircraft.

== History ==
In 1665, the area was claimed for France by Antoine de Noël de la Trompe d'Or. In the 18th century, the Jesuits used the Palikur Amerindians for labor. This includes Aruã who had fled from the island Marajó. Later they were replaced by slaves from Africa. In 1852, a penal colony was established on a former coffee plantation, and was the first agricultural penal colony. The colony was finally closed in 1910, and was an economic failure with many prisoners dying or becoming ill. Between 1853 and 1864, 749 prisoners died at the colony.

== Geography ==
Ouanary is a commune of French Guiana, an overseas region and department of France located in South America. It is spread over an area of 1,080 km^{2} (420 sq mi), and located at sea level. It lies at the mouth of the river Oyapock, across the border with Brazil and is one of the most isolated communes in the department, and is accessible only by boat, or small aircraft through the Ouanary Airport.

Montagne d'Argent is located in the commune. In 1998, the mountain came under the protection of Conservatoire du littoral, because 22 petroglyphs had been discovered on the mountain.

== Demographics ==
Ouanary had an estimated population of 150 people in 2023, and is the least populated commune of French Guiana. As of 2014, there were 48 houses in the settlement of which 37 residences (77%) were occupied. Out of the eligible population of 87 people (15–64 years), 63 (72%) were employed of which 32 people worked for the municipality. In 2015, 12 companies were operating in the commune with seven of them based on agriculture.

== See also ==
- Communes of French Guiana
