= Saint-Laurent-du-Maroni Airport =

Airport in French Guiana, South America

- IATA: LDX; ICAO: SOOM

Summary
- Operator: Conseil général de la Guyane
- Serves: Saint-Laurent-du-Maroni, French Guiana
- Elevation AMSL: 17 ft / 5 m
- Coordinates: 05°29′00″N 54°02′04″W

Map
- Location of airport in French Guiana

Runways
Direction	Length		Surface
Direction	m	ft	Surface
04/22	1,000	3,281	Asphalt
- Source: GCM Google Maps

Saint-Laurent-du-Maroni Airport (IATA: LDX, ICAO: SOOM) is an airport serving Saint-Laurent-du-Maroni, a commune of French Guiana. The city is on the Maroni River, the border with Suriname.

The St Laurent Du Maroni non-directional beacon (Ident: CW) is located 0.9 nautical miles (1.7 km) south of the field.

== Airline and destinations ==
Airlines	Destinations
Guyane Express Fly	Cayenne, Grand Santi, Maripasoula

== See also ==
- List of airports in French Guiana
- Transport in French Guiana
