= Grand-Santi =

Commune in French Guiana, France

- Commune
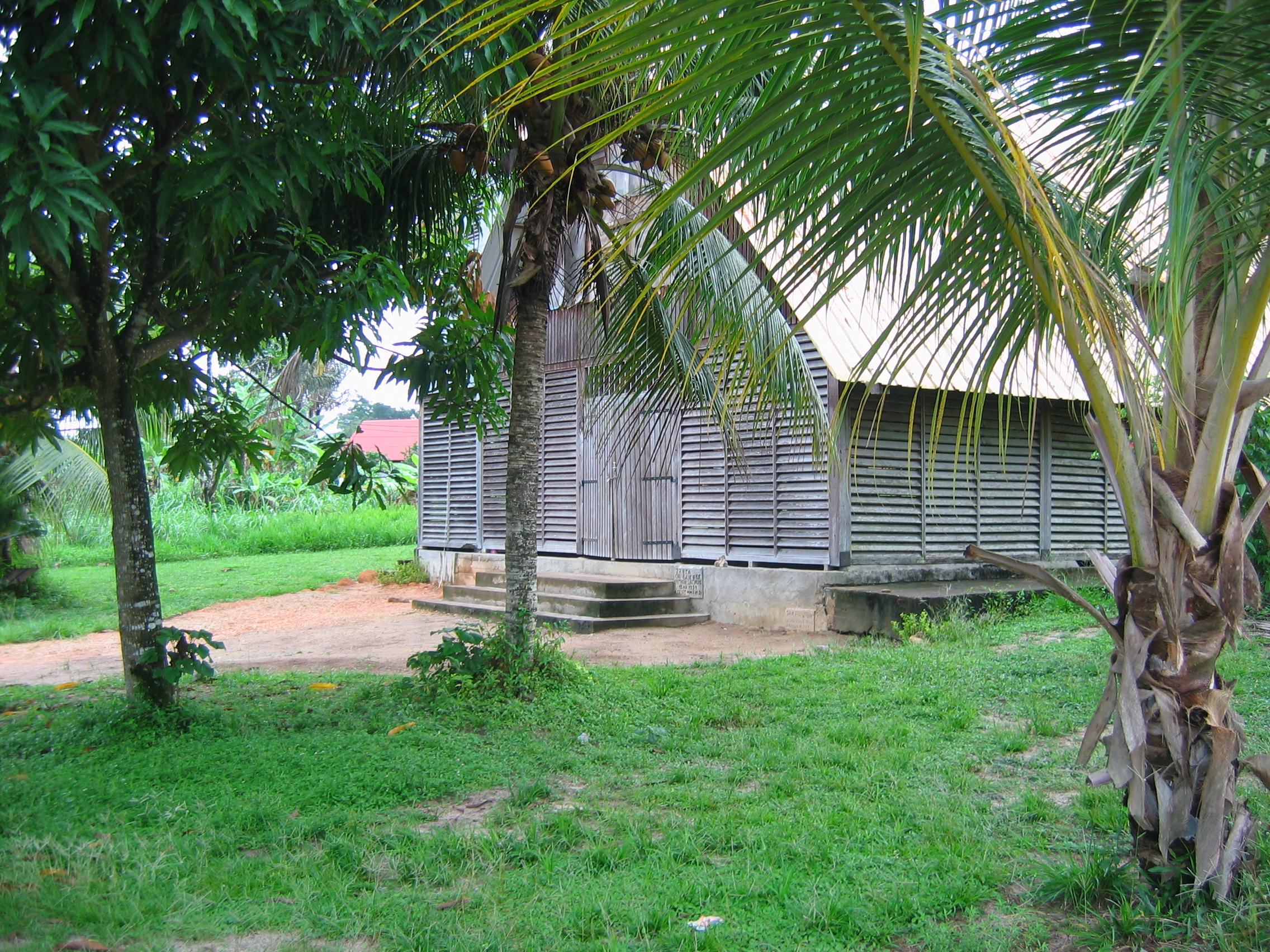
- Church of Grand-Santi

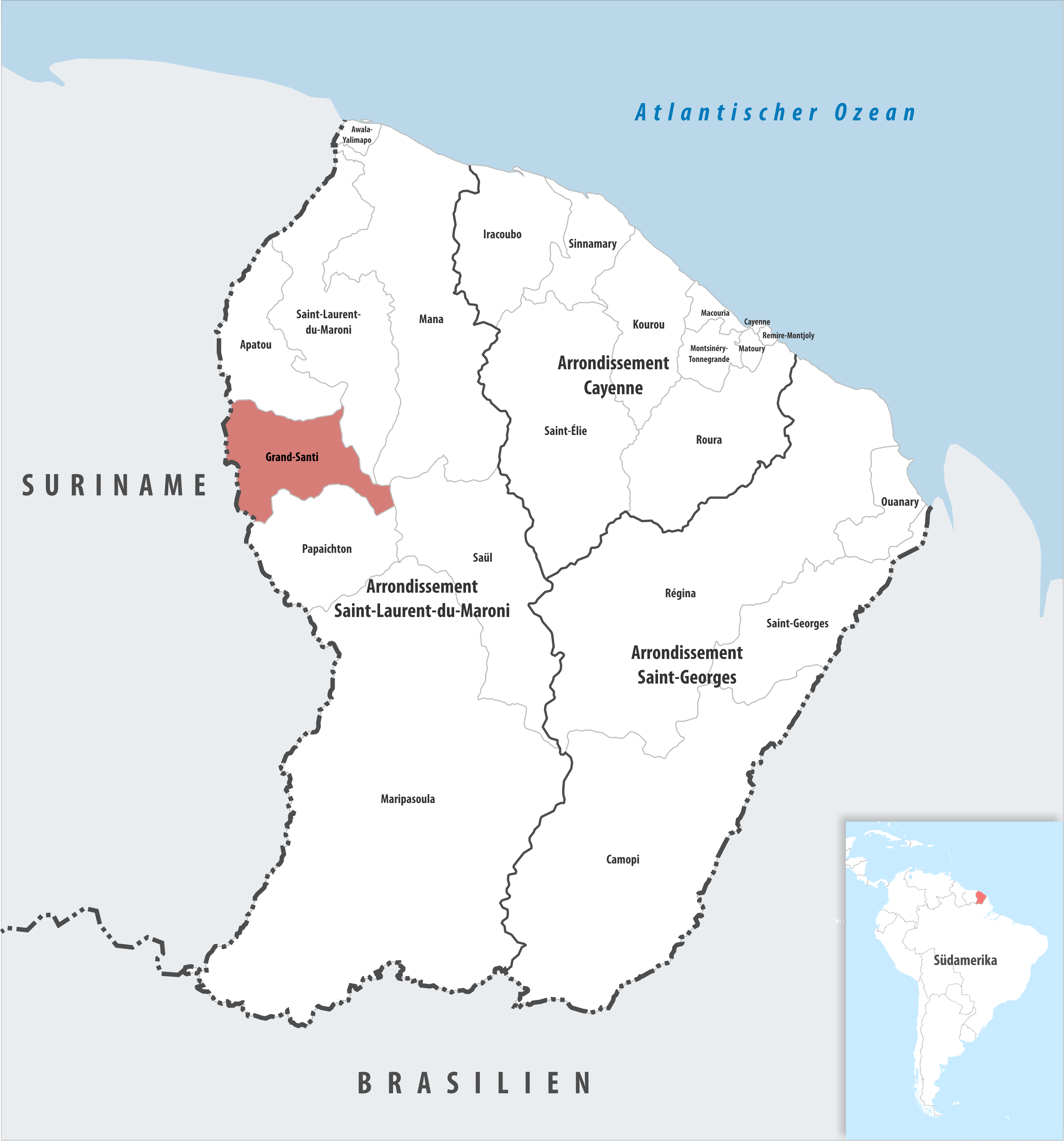
- Location of the commune (in red) within French Guiana
- Location of Grand-Santi
- Coordinates: 4°16′26″N 54°22′58″W
- Country: France
- Overseas region and department: French Guiana
- Arrondissement: Saint-Laurent-du-Maroni
- Intercommunality: Ouest Guyanais

Government
  - Mayor (2020–2026): Felix Dada
- Area^{1}: 2,112 km^{2} (815 sq mi)
- Population (2023): 9,668
  - Density: 4.578/km^{2} (11.86/sq mi)
- Time zone: UTC−03:00
- INSEE/Postal code: 97357 /97340
- ^{1} French Land Register data, which excludes lakes, ponds, glaciers > 1 km^{2} (0.386 sq mi or 247 acres) and river estuaries.

Grand-Santi (French pronunciation: [ɡʁɑ̃ sɑ̃ti]; French Guianese Creole: Gransanti) is a commune of French Guiana, an overseas region and department of France in South America. It is located in the arrondissement of Saint-Laurent-du-Maroni and is accessible only by boat or air. Originally part of the larger commune of Grand-Santi-Papaichton, it assumed its current name in 1993 following the separation of Papaichton as an independent commune. The population is composed mainly of Ndyuka people and Surinamese refugees, and the local economy is based primarily on small-scale agriculture and fishing.

== History ==
The commune was originally called Grand-Santi-Papaichton and included the now independent communes of Apatou and Papaichton. On 12 November 1976 Apatou was detached from Grand-Santi-Papaichton and became an independent commune. On 1 January 1993 Papaichton was also detached from Grand-Saint-Papaichton and became an independent commune. On that occasion, the name of the commune was shortened into Grand-Santi. The commune mainly lives from small-scale agriculture, such as rice and cassava, and fishing. The commune also contains other villages like Belikampoe.

== Demographics ==
The population of Grand-Santi has experienced significant population growth since the late 20th century, despite a brief fluctuation in the early years of recording. As detailed in the historical census data below, the commune's population stood at 723 inhabitants in 1968, rose to 1,041 in 1975, and then experienced a temporary decline to 754 residents in 1982. Following this period, the population entered a trajectory of rapid and continuous expansion, more than doubling by 1990 and reaching 2,862 by 1999. This upward trend accelerated into the 21st century, with the population nearly doubling again between 2007 and 2012, and ultimately rising to 9,668 inhabitants by 2023. This recent growth is reflected in an annual population growth rate of 4.18% measured between 2015 and 2023.

Administratively situated within the arrondissement of Saint-Laurent-du-Maroni, Grand-Santi accounts for 9.5% of the total population of the arrondissement. The commune encompasses an area of 2,112 square kilometers, which represents 5.16% of the arrondissement's total land area. Based on the 2023 population estimate and area, the population density of Grand-Santi stands at 4.578 inhabitants per square kilometer.

Most of the inhabitants are Ndyuka people, as well as Surinamese refugees.

Historical population
Year	Pop.	±% p.a.
1967	723	—
1974	1,041	+5.35%
1982	754	−3.95%
1990	1,786	+11.38%
1999	2,862	+5.38%
2007	3,427	+2.28%
2012	6,029	+11.96%
2017	7,918	+5.60%
2023	9,668	+3.38%
Source: INSEE

== Transport ==
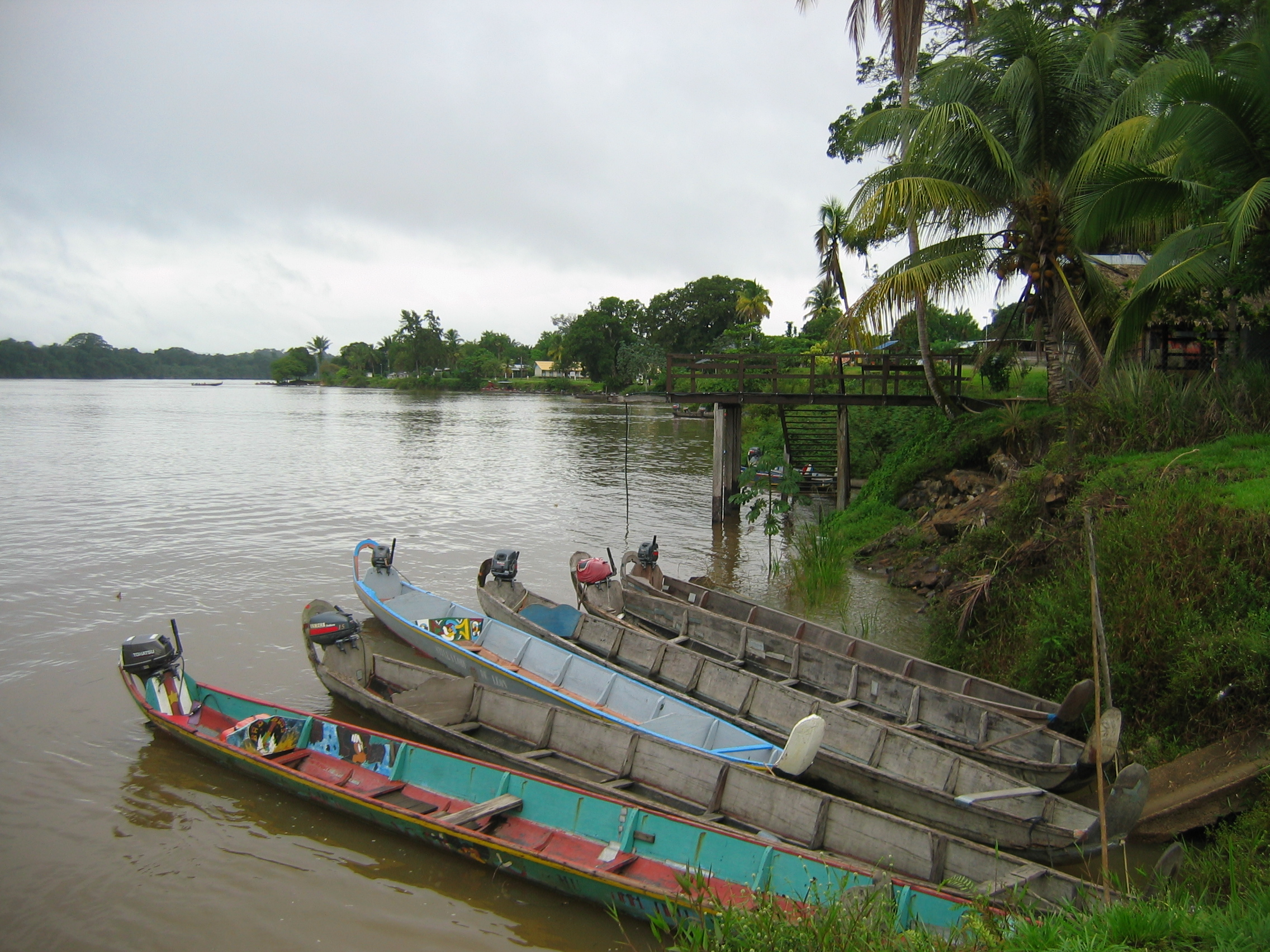
Canoes on the Maroni River

The commune can only be reached by boat or airplane. The Grand-Santi Airport is located 1 km (0.54 NM) northeast of Grand-Santi.

== See also ==
- Communes of French Guiana
