= Transport in French Guiana =

Map of French Guiana

Transport in French Guiana consists of transport by road, boat, bus, and airplane. There is a railway line within the Guiana Space Centre to transport spacecraft. The road network is mainly concentrated in the coastal region. The interior of Guiana is accessed by plane or boat. There is one main airport, however there are several smaller airstrips in the interior.

== Highways ==
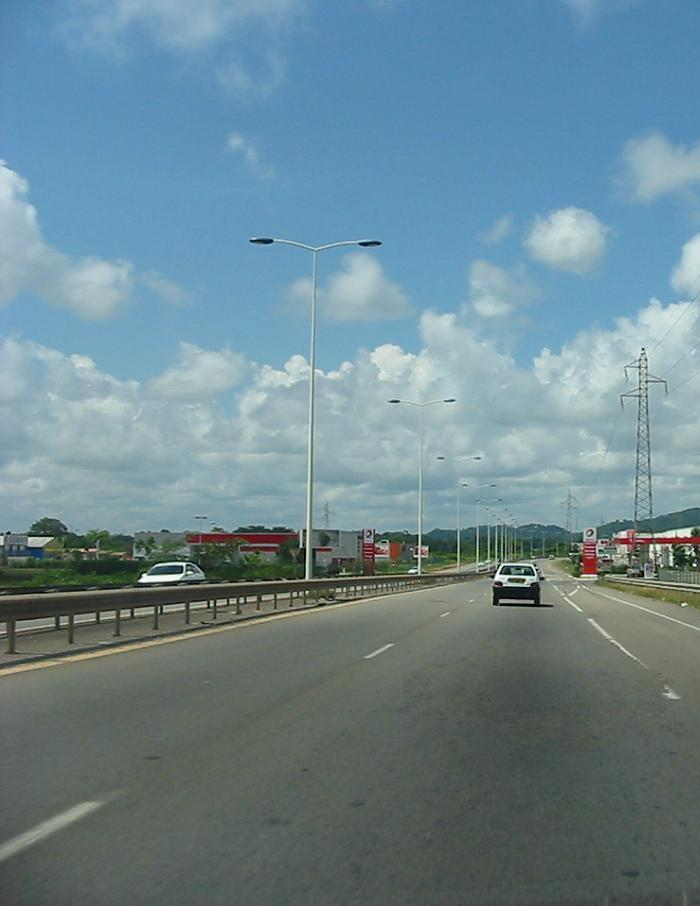
RN1 near Cayenne

As of 2018, there are 440 kilometres of national roads, 408 kilometres of departmental road, and 1,311 kilometres of municipal roads. There is no motorway.

Following a treaty between France and Brazil signed in July 2005, the Oyapock River Bridge over the Oyapock River was built and completed in 2011, becoming the first land crossing ever between French Guiana and the rest of the world (there is a ferry crossing to Albina, Suriname). The bridge was officially opened on 18 March 2017, however the border post introduction on the Brazilian caused additional delays. As of 2020, it is possible to drive uninterrupted from Cayenne to Macapá, the capital of the state of Amapá in Brazil.

== Railways ==
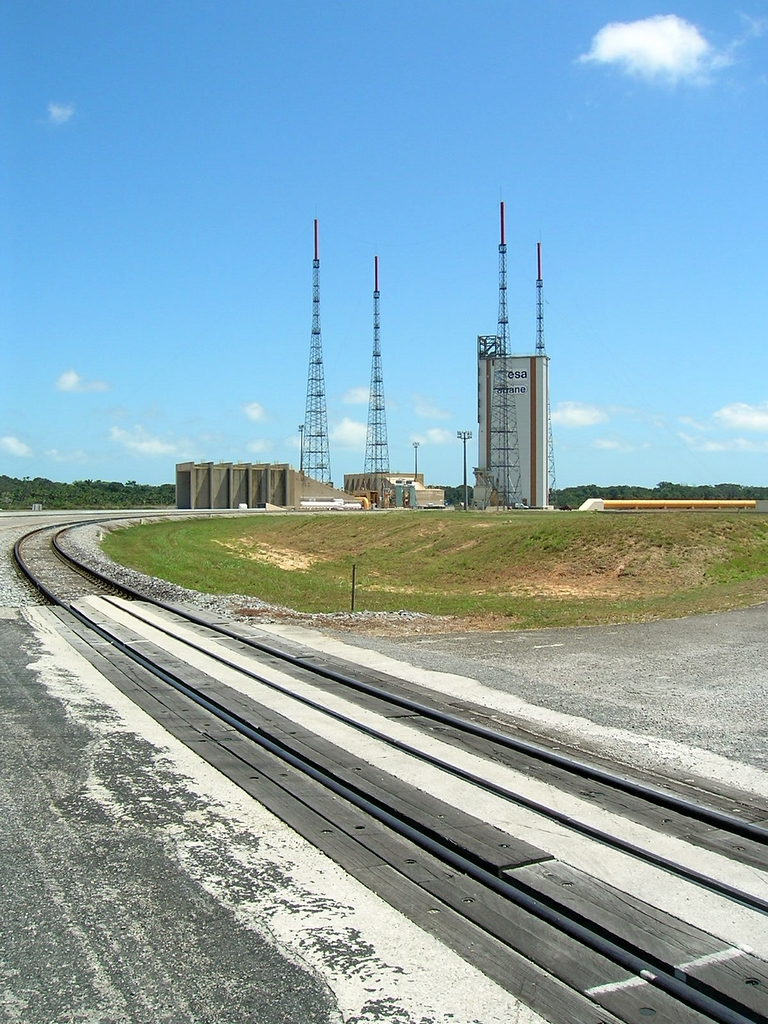
The railway in the Guiana Space Centre

A short railway is used within the Guiana Space Centre (this short railway is for transporting spacecraft inside the base to the launch pad, not for passenger use). The railway is double tracked and used by unpowered rail cars (tanker cars, flatcars and launch table transporter platforms fitted with bogies) and are towed by rubber wheeled vehicles with railway wheels or bogies to ride along the rail tracks (Road–rail vehicles).

From 1880s to sometime after 1926 a steam narrow gauge railway was used for gold mines in Saint-Elie and two other lines were partially built and never used.

Two prison railways were built in the 1890s. One line connected Saint-Laurent-du-Maroni to Saint-Jean-du-Maroni. Another line went to Charvein. The railway lines were abandoned after prisons closed and disappeared sometime after 1946.

There are no other railways in French Guiana and none have existed for revenue passenger service, and there are no connections to neighbouring countries. Some maps – including some on Wikipedia – depicting railway density give the impression of railways existing in French Guiana due to conflating the existing railways in the metropole with the lack of same in French Guiana, thus creating a statistical artifact.

== Airports ==
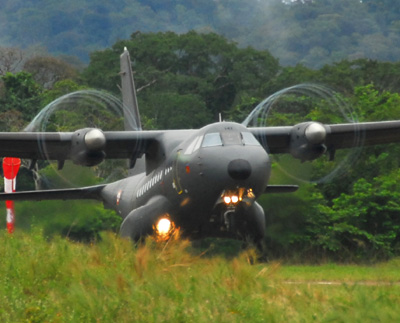
CASA/IPTN CN-235 taking off from Maripasoula Airport

The main international airport of French Guiana is Cayenne – Félix Eboué Airport. The secondary international airport is the Saint-Laurent-du-Maroni Airport.

In October 2020, the Camopi Airport was upgraded for regular passenger transport.

There are six smaller restricted airports:

- Grand-Santi Airport
- Maripasoula Airport
- Régina Airport
- Saint-Georges-de-l'Oyapock Airport
- Saül Airport
- Sinnamary Airport

== Public transport ==
The CACL (Communauté d'Agglomération du Centre Littoral) provides bus service for the urban area of Cayenne and its suburbs. As of 2021, there are six urban bus lines. School transport is also handled by CACL.

Since early 2010, an agreement was established between the General Council, responsible for organizing transport between the towns, and Taxi Co. The new public service became known as TIG (Long Distance Transport of Guyana).

As of 2021, TIG provides nine bus lines to towns outside the urban area of Cayenne.

== Harbours ==
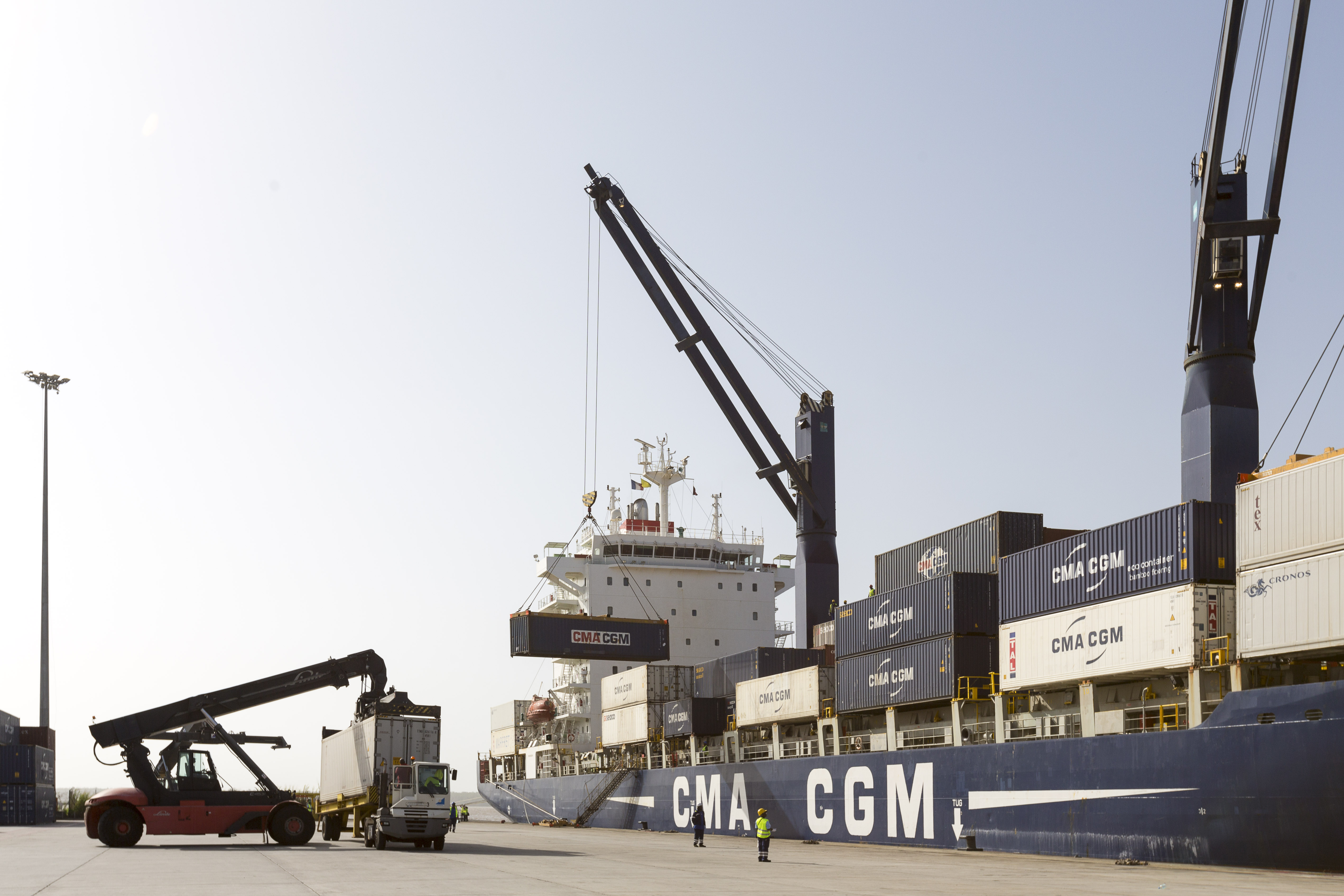
Degrad des Cannes

The main harbour is Degrad des Cannes. The harbour was built in 1972, and handles all international cargo from and to French Guiana. In 2007, the port handled about 700,000 tonnes of cargo. The port also includes as a marina.

Other harbours include Cayenne, Kourou, Larivot in Matoury, and Saint-Laurent-du-Maroni.
