= Roads in French Guiana =

As of 2018, there are 440 kilometres of national roads, 408 kilometres of departmental road, and 1,311 kilometres of municipal roads in French Guiana. There is no motorway.

RN1 connects Cayenne with Saint-Laurent-du-Maroni in the west. RN2 connects Cayenne with Saint-Georges in the east. . RN1 goes to Suriname , RN2 goes to Brazil.

Following a treaty between France and Brazil signed in July 2005, the Oyapock River Bridge over the Oyapock River was built and completed in 2011, becoming the first land crossing ever between French Guiana and the rest of the world (there is a ferry crossing to Albina, Suriname). The bridge was officially opened on 18 March 2017, however the border post introduction on the Brazilian caused additional delays. As of 2020, it possible to drive uninterrupted from Cayenne to Macapá, the capital of the state of Amapá in Brazil.

RN3 to Dégrad des Cannes, the main harbour, and RN4 to Cayenne – Félix Eboué Airport became departmental routes in 2007, and merely retain the name.

There are plans to build a Route nationale from Saint-Laurent-du-Maroni to Maripasoula, however as of 2021, the road ends south of Apatou.

== Departmental roads ==
The most important departmental roads in French Guiana in 2007 are:

Number	Start	End	Comment
RD1	Cayenne	Remire-Montjoly	Northern route
RD2	Cayenne	Remire-Montjoly	Southern route
RD5	Macouria (RN1)	RN2	Via Montsinéry
RD6	Matoury (RN2)	Kaw	Via Roura
RD8	Iracoubo (RN1)	Mana	
RD9	Mana	Saint-Laurent-du-Maroni (RN1)	Via Charvein
RD10	Charvein (RD9)	Acarouany	
RD11	Saint-Laurent-du-Maroni (RN1)	Saint-Jean-du-Maroni	Continues to Apatou
RD16	Kourou	Sinnamary	Old route via Guiana Space Centre. RN1 is the main road. RD16 is closed during launches.
RD21	Sinnamary (RN1)	Saint-Élie	Road ends at Petit-Saut Dam, and a 45-minute ferry is needed to Piste de Saint-Elie near Saint-Nazaire.
RD22	Mana	Awala-Yalimapo	
RD24	Remire-Montjoly	Matoury (RN2)	
RD50	Régina (RN2)	Cacao	
RN3	Cayenne (RN1)	Dégrad des Cannes	Downgraded to departmental road
RN4	Sainte-Rose-de-Lima (RN2)	Cayenne – Félix Eboué Airport	Downgraded to departmental road

== MAPS ==
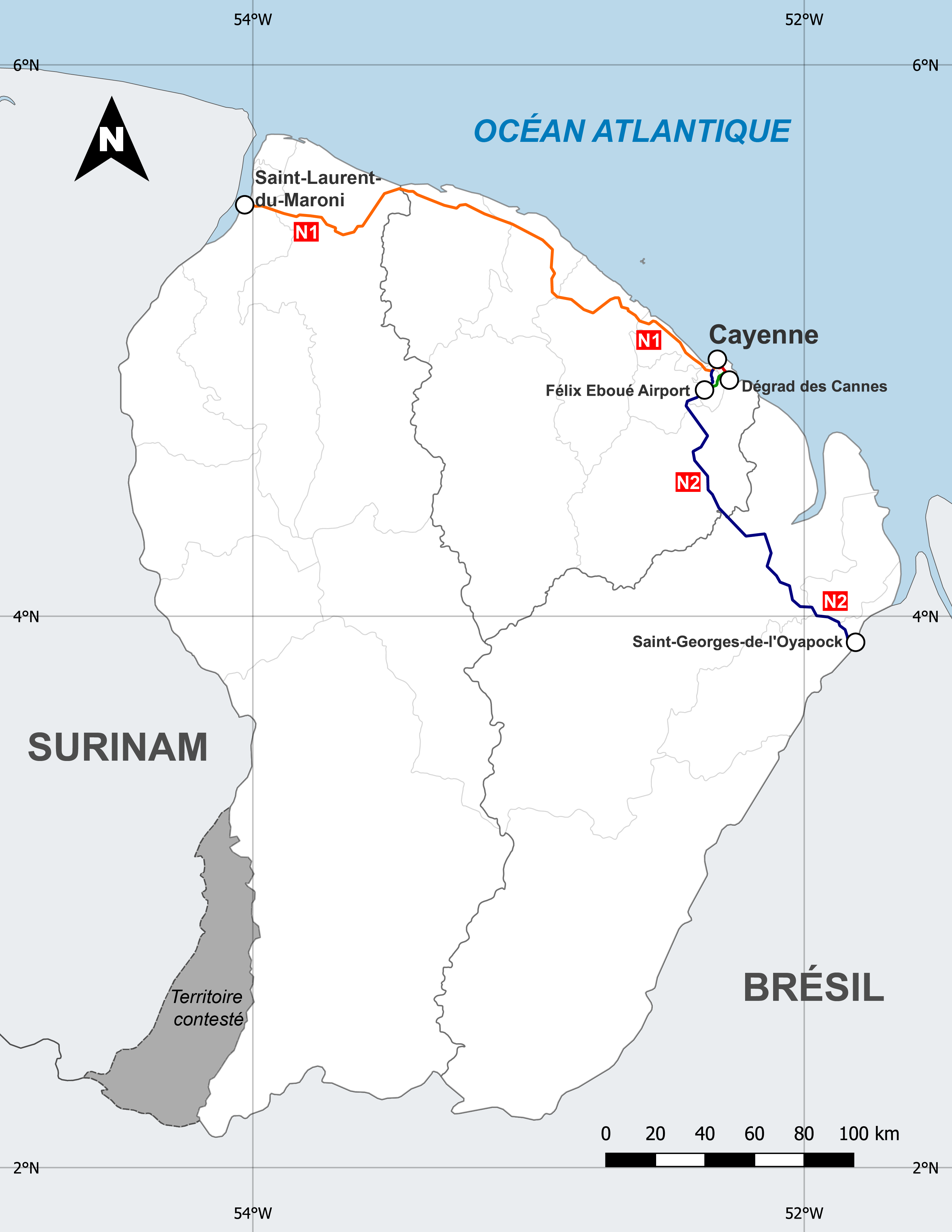
French Guiana Roads N1-N2

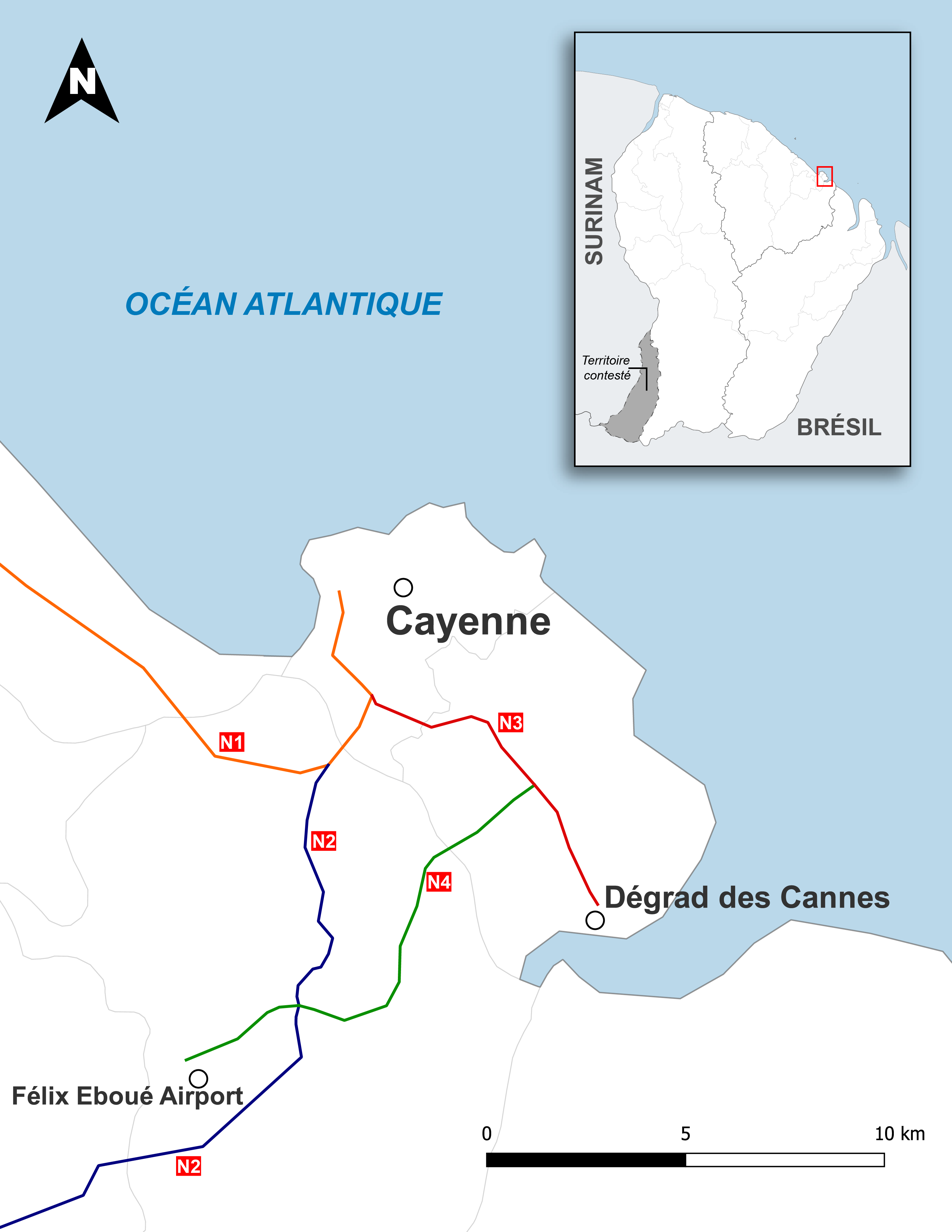
Cayenne Roads N1,N2,N3,N4
