= Route nationale 1 (French Guiana) =

Road in French Guiana

National road 1
- Route nationale 1
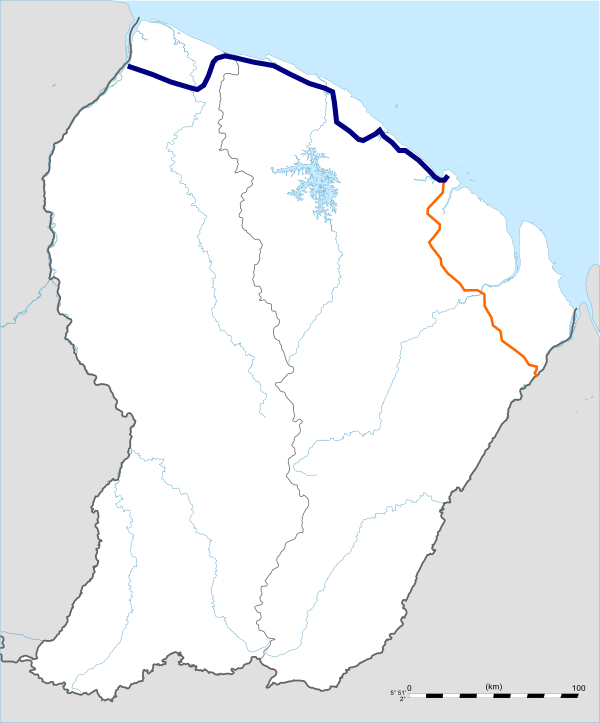
- Route national 1 in blue

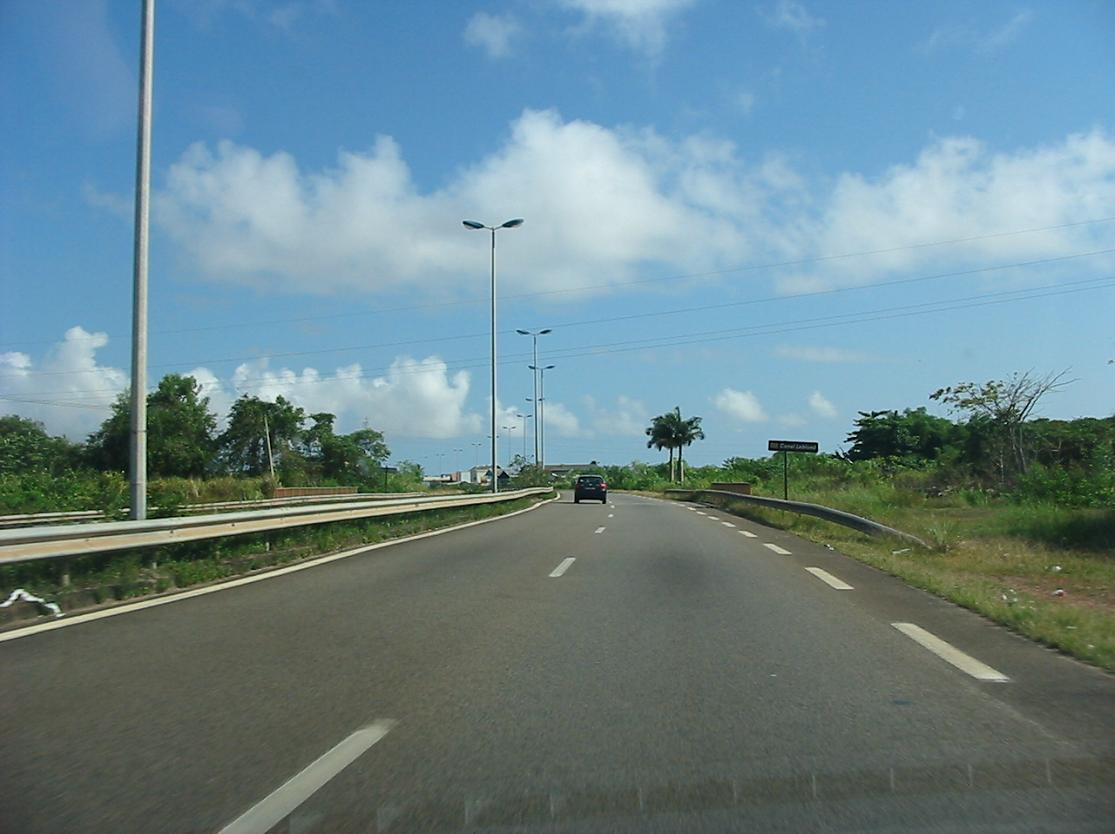
- Route nationale 1 near Cayenne

Route information
- Length: 258 km (160 mi)

Major junctions
- West end: Cayenne
- RN3 Dégrad des Cannes; RN2 Saint-Georges; Kourou; RD21 Saint-Élie / Sinnamary; Iracoubo; RD8 Mana; RD9 Charvein; RD11 Saint-Jean-du-Maroni; Saint-Laurent-du-Maroni
- East end: Albina

Location
- Country: France
- Overseas region: French Guiana
- Department: Guyane

Highway system
- Highways in French Guiana

Route nationale 1 (RN1) is a highway in French Guiana, an overseas region and department of France in South America. The highway connects Cayenne with Saint-Laurent-du-Maroni on the Suriname border and measures 258 kilometres (160 mi). The highway is the busiest road of French Guiana.

== Overview ==
In 1863, road construction started on Route Coloniale 1 to connect Cayenne with Saint-Laurent-du-Maroni. The road was built by prisoners of the penal colony. Many prisoners died during the construction. In 1970s, the section connecting Kourou with Sinnamary was rerouted for the construction of the Guiana Space Centre. In 1999, the road between Balata and Maringouins was widened to a 2x2 lanes dual carriageway. In 2014, a grade-separated intersection with Route nationale 2 to Saint-Georges was opened. The busiest section is in Cayenne where 44,543 vehicles per day used the road in 2010.

== Route ==
The highways begins in Cayenne. In Balata, Matoury, there is an intersection with Route National 2. The road continues to Kourou, makes a detour around the Guiana Space Centre, and continues to Sinnamary, Iracoubo, and finally ends in Saint-Laurent-du-Maroni. In Saint-Laurent-du-Maroni there is a ferry to Albina, Suriname.

== Future plans ==
There are plans for a bridge connecting Saint-Laurent-du-Maroni with Albina. The bridge was on the agenda in a ministerial meeting between France and Suriname in November 2020. An interesting part about the bridge is that Suriname uses left-hand drive while French Guiana uses right-hand drive.
