= Arrondissements of the Guyane department =

Administrative divisions of Guyane, France

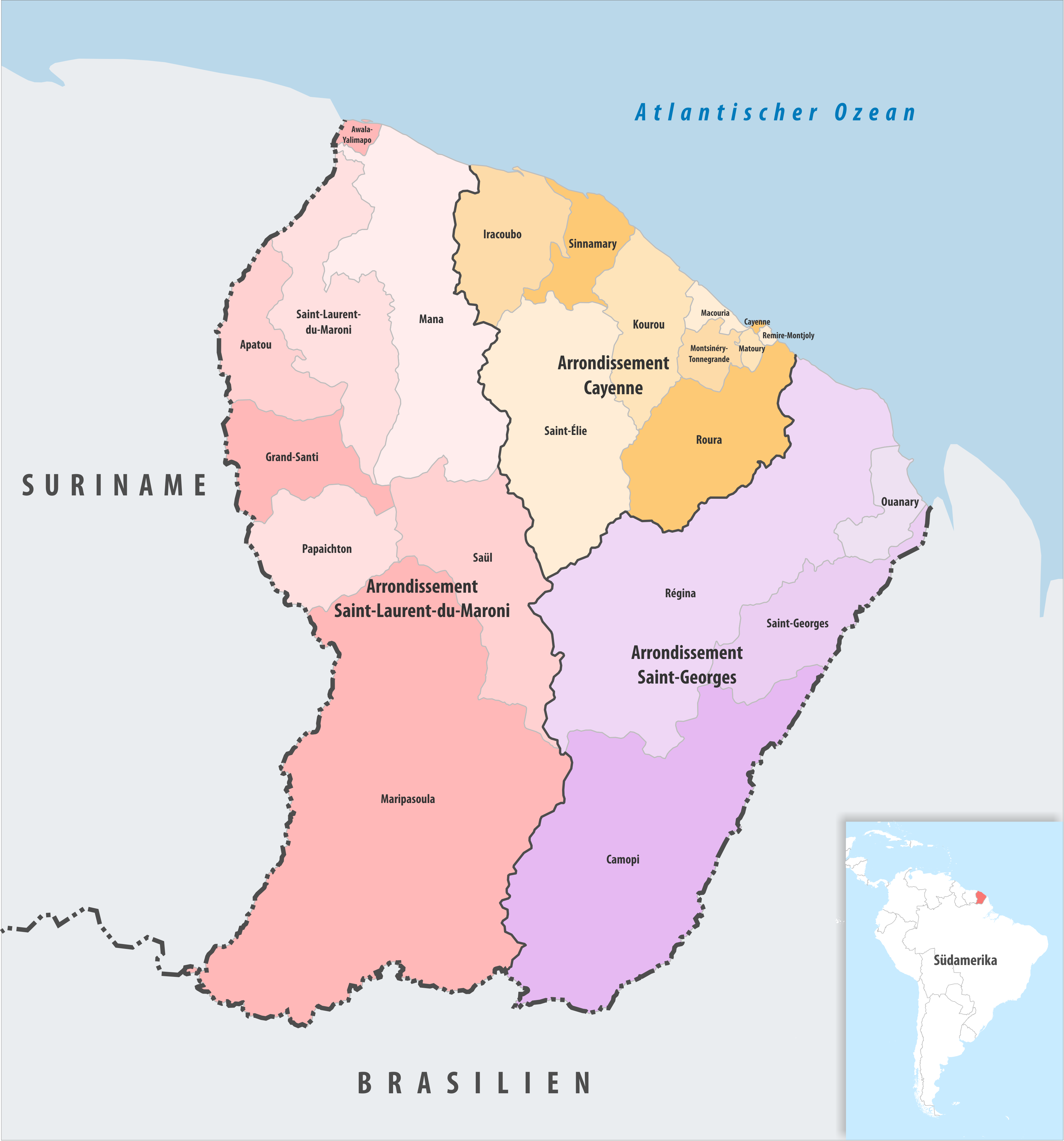
Map of the arrondissements of Guyane since October 2022.

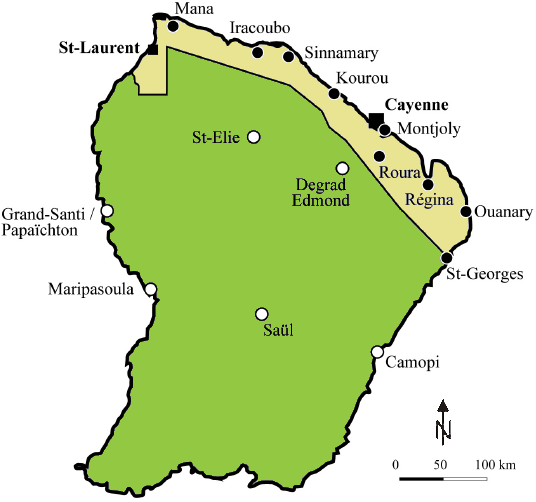
Map of the arrondissements of Guyane in 1952 (green: Inini, yellow: Cayenne).

The 3 arrondissements of the Guyane department are:

1. Arrondissement of Cayenne (prefecture of the Guyane department: Cayenne), with 10 communes. The population of the arrondissement was 180,493 in 2021.
2. Arrondissement of Saint-Georges (subprefecture: Saint-Georges), with 4 communes. The population of the arrondissement was 8,557 in 2021.
3. Arrondissement of Saint-Laurent-du-Maroni (subprefecture: Saint-Laurent-du-Maroni), with 8 communes. The population of the arrondissement was 97,568 in 2021.

== History ==
At the creation of the department of Guyane in 1947, its only arrondissement was Cayenne. The arrondissement of Inini, containing the previously unincorporated inland territory of French Guiana, was created in 1951. In 1969 the arrondissement of Inini was disbanded, and the territory of French Guiana was divided between the arrondissement of Cayenne and the new arrondissement of Saint-Laurent-du-Maroni. In October 2022, the arrondissement of Saint-Georges was created by detaching from the arrondissement of Cayenne 4 communes of the Oyapock River valley bordering Brazil, in order to bring French central state services closer to this area located nearly 200 km from Cayenne.

== See also ==
- Cantons of the Guyane department
- Communes of the Guyane department
