= Communes of French Guiana =

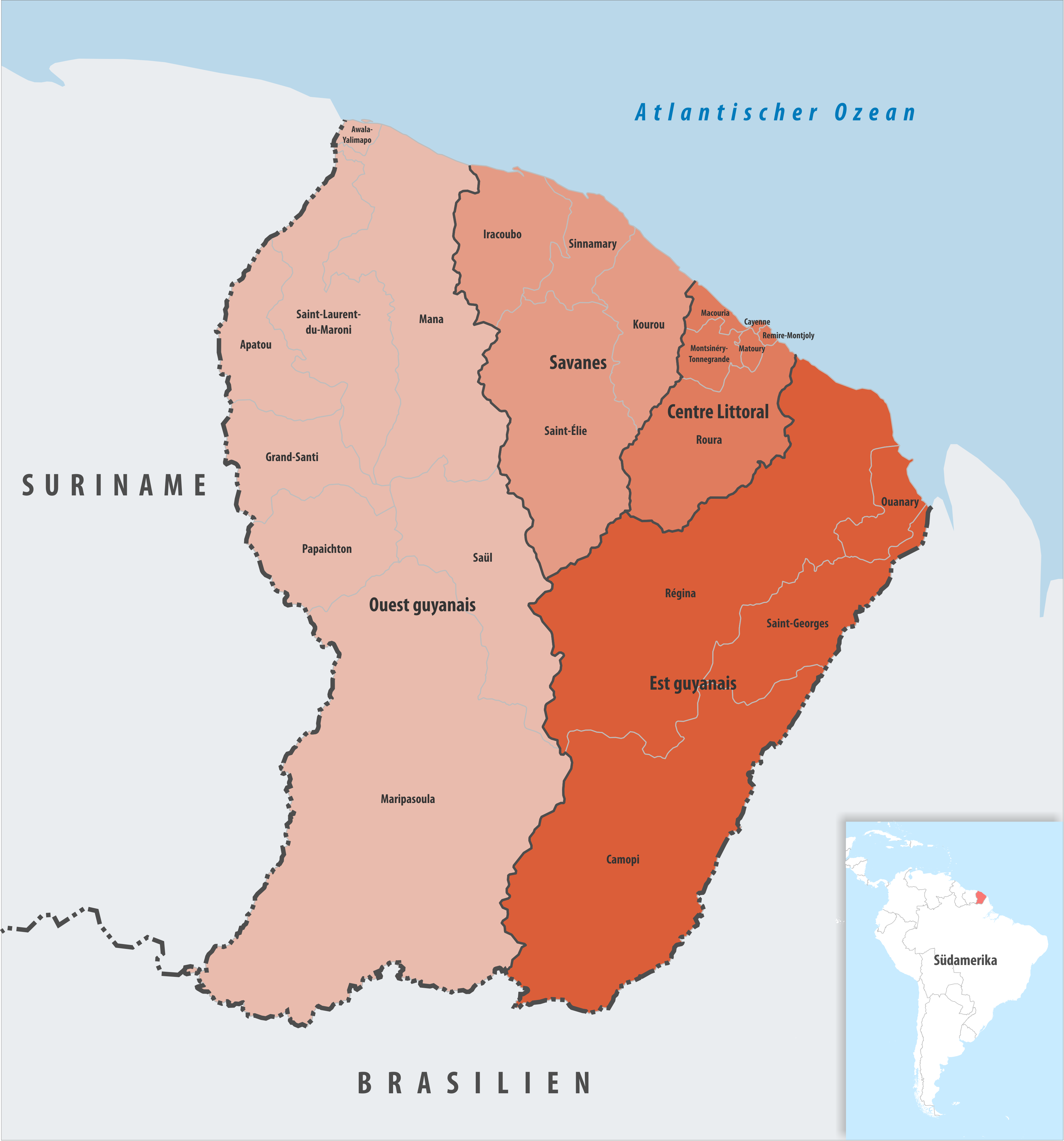
Gemeindeverbände in Französisch-Guyana 2018

The following is a list of the 22 communes in French Guiana, France.

The communes cooperate in the following intercommunalities (as of 2025):

- Communauté d'agglomération du Centre Littoral
- Communauté de communes de l'Est guyanais
- Communauté de communes de l'Ouest guyanais
- Communauté de communes des Savanes

INSEE code	Postal code	Commune name	Intercommunality	Arrondissement	Size
97360	97317	Apatou	Ouest	Saint-Laurent-du-Maroni	2,020 km2 (780 sq mi)
97361	97319	Awala-Yalimapo	Ouest	Saint-Laurent-du-Maroni	187.4 km2 (72.4 sq mi)
97356	97330	Camopi	Est	Saint-Georges	
97302	97300	Cayenne			
97357	97340	Grand-Santi			
97303	97350	Iracoubo			
97304	97310	Kourou			
97305	97355	Macouria			
97306	97360	Mana			
97353	97370	Maripasoula			
97307	97351	Matoury			
97313	97356	Montsinéry-Tonnegrande			
97314	97380	Ouanary			
97362	97340	Papaichton			
97301	97390	Régina			
97309	97354	Remire-Montjoly			
97310	97311	Roura			
97358	97312	Saint-Élie			
97308	97313	Saint-Georges			
97311	97320	Saint-Laurent-du-Maroni			
97352	97314	Saül			
97312	97315	Sinnamary			
