= Prison of the Annamites =

Prison camp in French Guiana

- Camp Crique Anguille
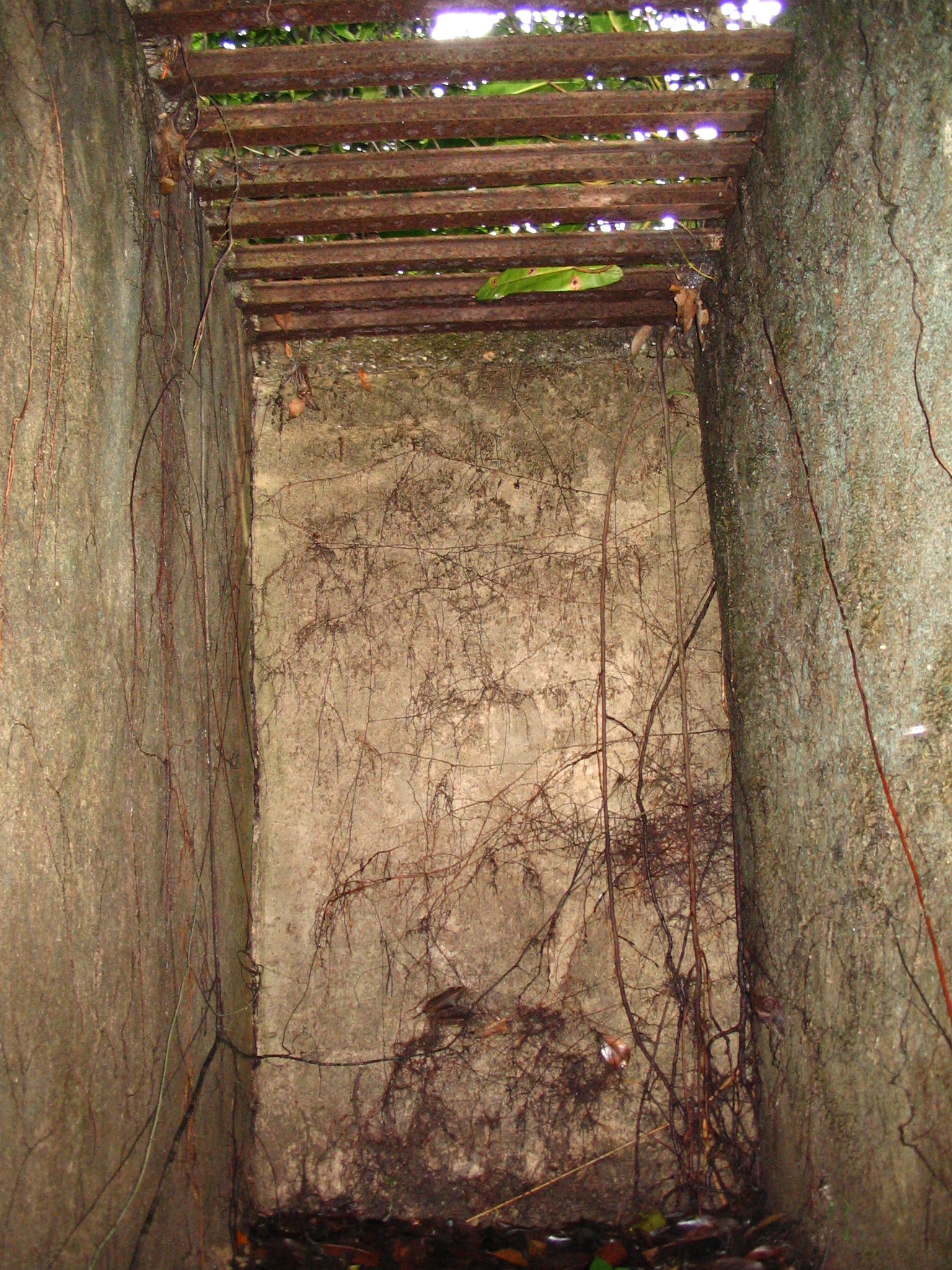
- Prison cell

- Location within French Guiana

General information
- Location: Tonnegrande, French Guiana
- Coordinates: 4.82587°N 52.51642°W
- Opened: April 1931
- Closed: 6 December 1944

Prison of the Annamites (French: Bagne des Annamites or Camp Crique Anguille) is a former prison in the commune of Montsinéry-Tonnegrande in French Guiana. The prison was built for Annamite prisoners who had revolted against French rule. The purpose of the prison was to develop the Inini territory. The prison was in operation between 1931 and 1944.

== Background ==
On 10 February 1930, Annamite soldiers, in what is nowadays called Vietnam, revolted against French rule during the Yên Bái mutiny. 13 soldiers were guillotined, and the remainder were to be exiled. In February 1931, circa 100 political prisoners and circa 400 common law convicts, boarded the Martinière for French Guiana. The prisoners were first put in a prison in Cayenne, but revolted again.

On 6 June 1930, the territory of Inini had been established to develop the interior of French Guiana separately from the coastal area.

== Overview ==
In April 1931, it was decided to move the Annamites to three camps: a forest camp in Apatou, Petit Saut, and Camp Crique Anguille. Of the 535 prisoners, 395 were sent to Camp Crique Anguille. to serve as a labour force for the Inini territory. Senegalese Tirailleurs were brought in to guard and oversee the prisoners. When the prisoners arrived, there was nothing at the site, and they had to build the prison themselves. The camp measured 414 hectares (1,020 acres), and the main purpose was the construction of a railway line linking all three camps.

In 1937 the prisoners revolted. In 1940, the Senegalese troops were replaced by French Guianan soldiers. On 6 December 1944, the camp was closed, and the prisoners were moved to the normal prisons. The first group was released in July 1946, however some had to wait until August 1953.

== Current situation ==
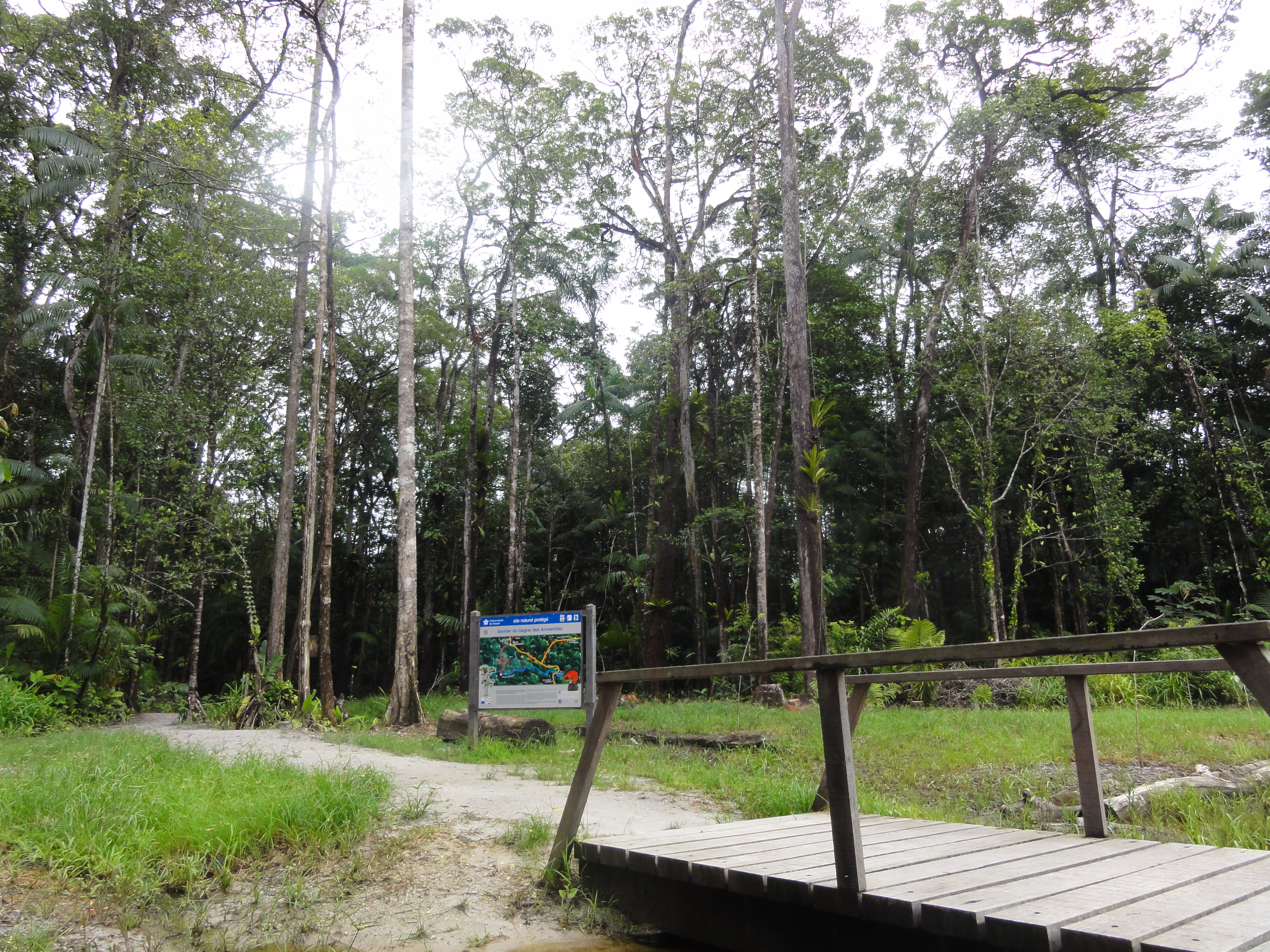
Entrance to the camp

In 2012, a 202 hectares area around the camp was designated as a protected area, because it is home to bactris nancibaensis, a rare palm, and the Amazonian royal flycatcher. The site has an IUCN category IV status, and is administered by Conservatoire du littoral.

The camp was difficult to access. In 2013, a trail was built linking the camp to the RD5 road. The camp has been opened for visitors.

== See also ==
- Prison of St-Laurent-du-Maroni

== Bibliography ==
- Dedebant, Christèle (2024). Le Bagne des Annamites : Les derniers déportés politiques en Guyane (in French). Editions Actes Sud. ISBN 978-2-330-18950-1.
- Donet-Vincent, Danielle (2001). "Les "bagnes" des Indochinois en Guyane (1931-1963)". Persée. Outre-Mers. Revue d'histoire (in French).
