= Trois-Palétuviers =

Village in French Guiana

- Village
- Location in French Guiana
- Coordinates: 04°03′00″N 51°40′08″W
- Country: France
- Overseas region: French Guiana
- Arrondissement: Saint-Georges
- Commune: Saint-Georges

Population (2017)
  - Total: c. 180
- Time zone: UTC-3

Trois-Palétuviers (English: three mangroves) is a Palikur Amerindian village on the Oyapock River in French Guiana, France near the border with Brazil.

== Overview ==
Trois-Palétuviers was established in 1960. The Palikur used to live in circular communal houses with palm leaf roofs in semi-permanent villages. They were encouraged to live in permanent villages, and settled in one story prefabricated concrete houses.

Trois-Palétuviers has a school which is home to Cavaliers des Trois Palétuviers, a chess club who were invited to demonstrate their talents in Brussels in 2013. In 2017, there was a malaria outbreak in the region, and the Pasteur Institute has opened a screening centre in the village.

The village only has electricity in the evening, and is not connected to the internet. The village can be reached via the Oyapock River, and is located about one hour from Saint-Georges.

== Bibliography ==
- Ogeron, Clémence; Odonne, Guillaume (2018). "Palikur traditional roundwood construction in eastern French Guiana" (PDF). Journal of Ethnobiology and Ethnomedicine. 14 (1): 28. doi:10.1186/s13002-018-0226-7. PMC 5916587. PMID 29690891.
