= Saint-Élie =

Commune in French Guiana, France

- Commune
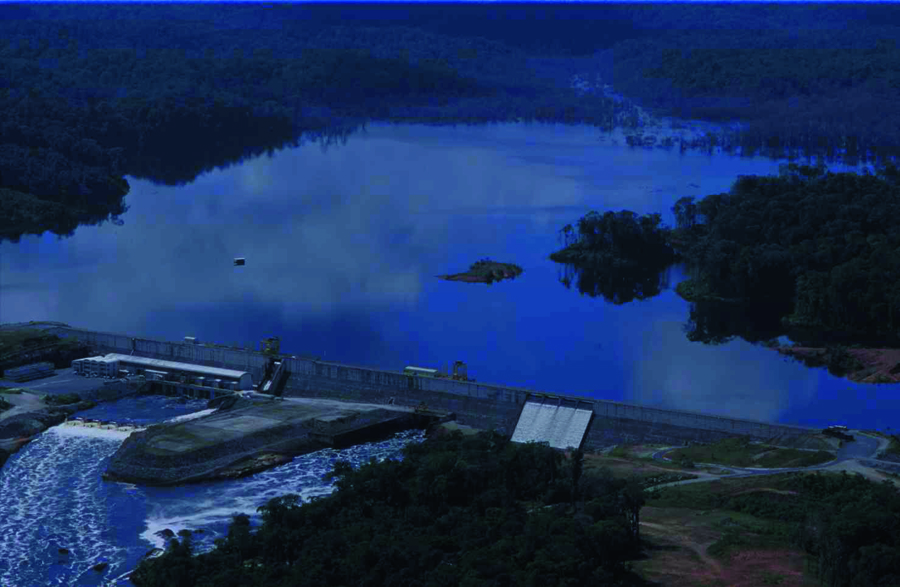
- The Petit-Saut Dam, northeast of the commune, on the border with Sinnamary

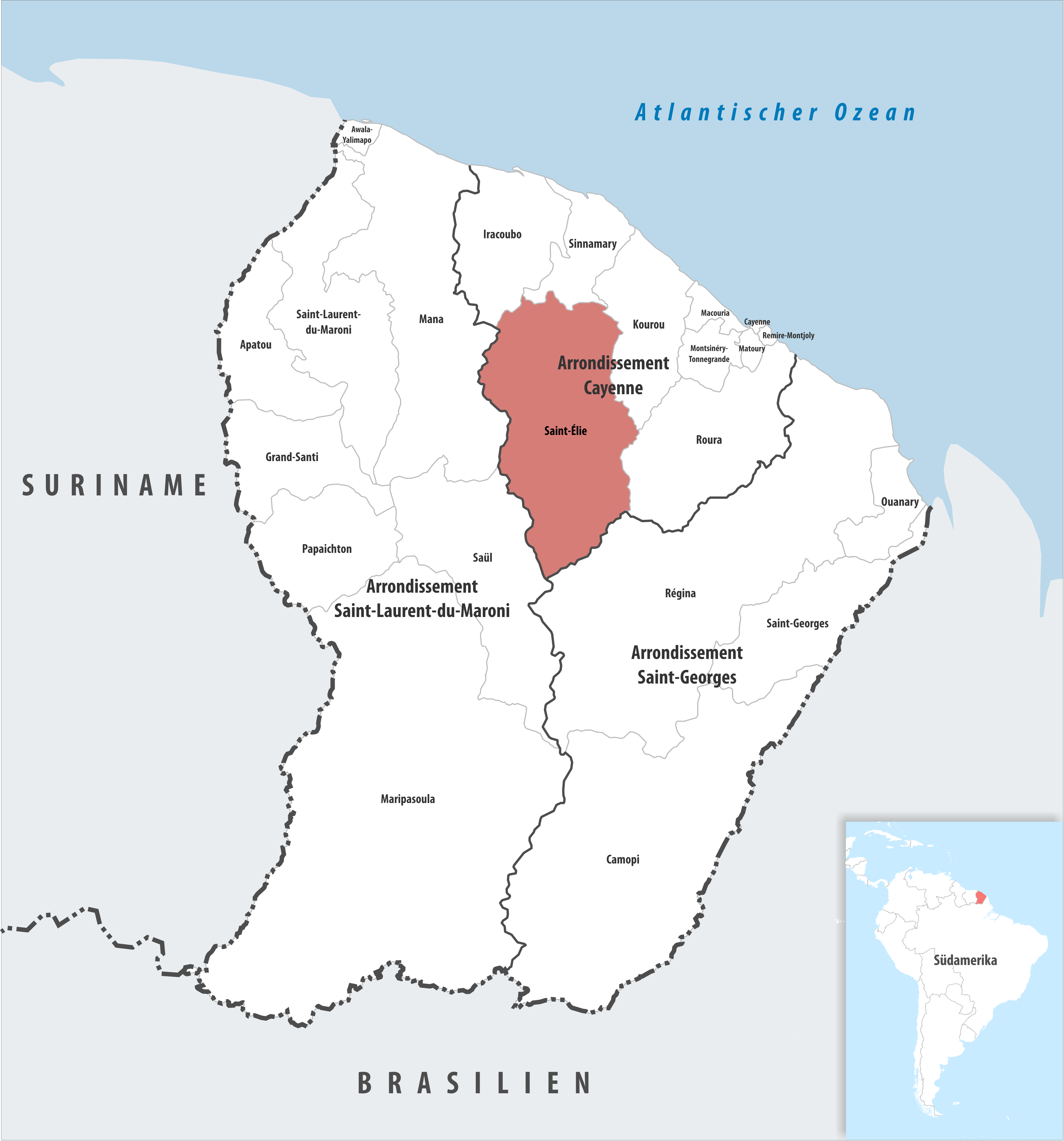
- Location of the commune (in red) within French Guiana
- Location of Saint-Élie
- Coordinates: 4°49′22″N 53°16′35″W
- Country: France
- Overseas region and department: French Guiana
- Arrondissement: Cayenne
- Intercommunality: CC des Savanes

Government
  - Mayor (2020–2026): Véronique Jacaria
- Area^{1}: 5,680 km^{2} (2,190 sq mi)
- Highest elevation: 32.54 m (106.8 ft)
- Population (2023): 159
  - Density: 0.0280/km^{2} (0.0725/sq mi)
- Time zone: UTC−03:00
- INSEE/Postal code: 97358 /97312
- ^{1} French Land Register data, which excludes lakes, ponds, glaciers > 1 km^{2} (0.386 sq mi or 247 acres) and river estuaries.

Saint-Élie (French pronunciation: [sɛ̃t‿eli]; French Guianese Creole: Sentéli) is a commune of French Guiana, an overseas department and region of France in South America. It constitutes a third of the territory of the arrondissement of Cayenne, yet is sparsely populated and accounts for a mere 0.09% of the arrondissement's residency. In 1930, Saint-Élie became capital of the Inini territory. From 1953 onward, the commune was called Centre. In 1969, it was renamed to Saint-Élie.

== History ==
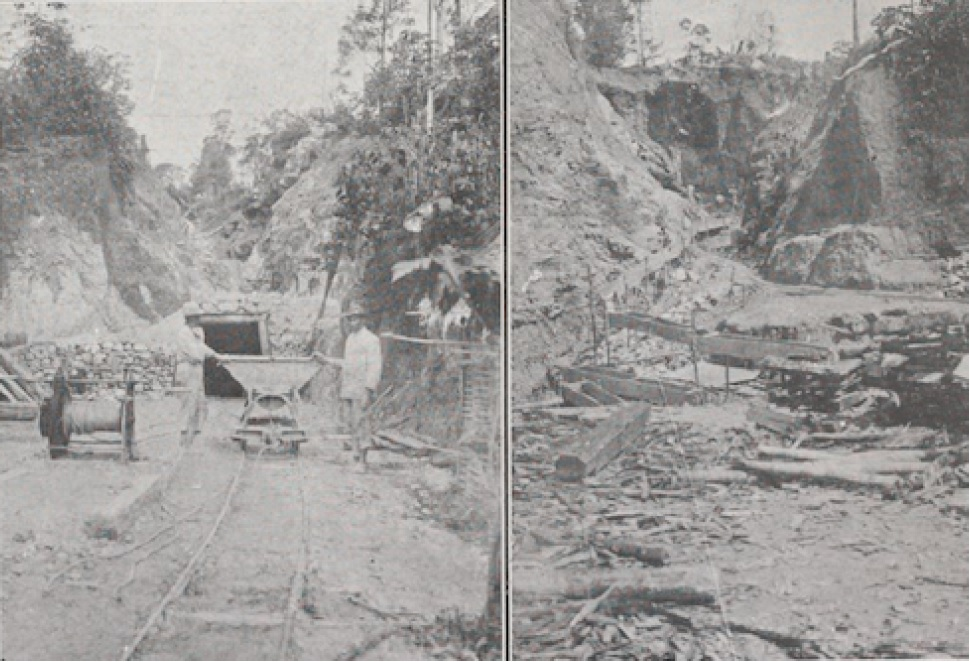
Gold mine in Saint-Élie with the railway

In 1873, gold was discovered in Saint-Élie. The mines were in the middle of the rain forest with no river connection to the outside world. In 1884 construction began on a Decauville railway line to Gare Tigre near Saint-Nazaire in order to access the Sinnamary River.

In 1930, Saint-Élie became capital of the Inini territory.

The railway line needed frequent repairs, and had over 100 bridges. In 1990, the railway line was abandoned when a road opened. The roads end near Saint-Nazaire, and a 45-minute ferry to Petit-Saut Dam is needed to reach the outside world.

Gold is still the backbone of the economy. The gold mines are currently being exploited by Newmont Mining Corporation. In 1989, construction started on the Petit-Saut Dam to produce hydroelectric power. The dam was completed in 1994.

== Nature ==
In 1996, La Trinité National Nature Reserve was founded. It covers 76,903 hectares and is primary tropical rain forest located in the heart of the Guyana plateau forest.

== Demographics ==
According to data from Institut national de la statistique et des études économiques (INSEE), the population of Saint-Élie has fluctuated significantly over recent decades. The commune recorded 138 inhabitants in 1982 and 123 in 1990, before nearly doubling to 239 residents by 1999. After peaking at an estimated 450 residents in 2007, the population dropped sharply to 95 inhabitants in 2015. However, Saint-Élie has since experienced a demographic rebound. Between 2015 and 2023, the population grew at an annual growth rate of 6.65%, reaching an official estimate of 159 residents. Despite being relatively large at 5,680 square kilometers which constitute 33.35% of the total land area of the arrondissement of Cayenne, Saint-Élie remains exceptionally sparsely populated. The population accounts for a mere 0.09% of the arrondissement's total residency. This stark contrast is reflected by an extremely low population density, measured at just 0.02799 inhabitants per square kilometer as of 2023.

== Villages ==
- Saint-Nazaire

== See also ==
- Communes of French Guiana
