= Route nationale 2 (French Guiana) =

Road in French Guiana

National road 2
- Route nationale 2
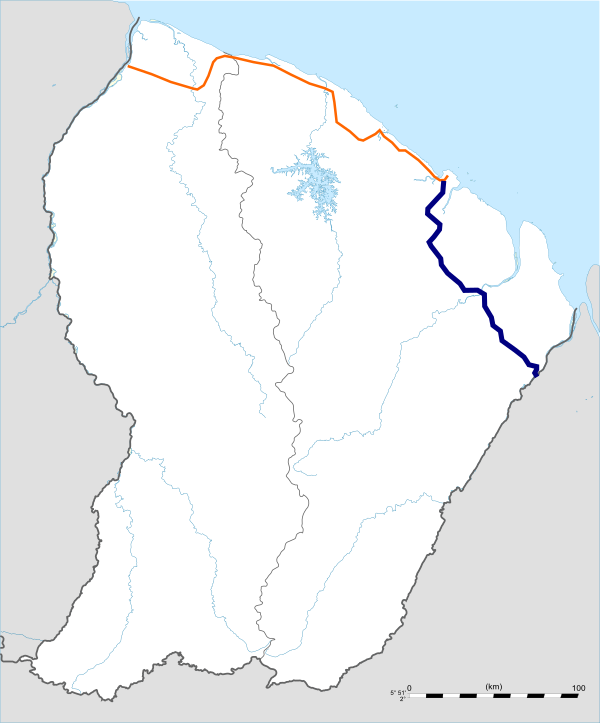
- Route nationale 2 in blue

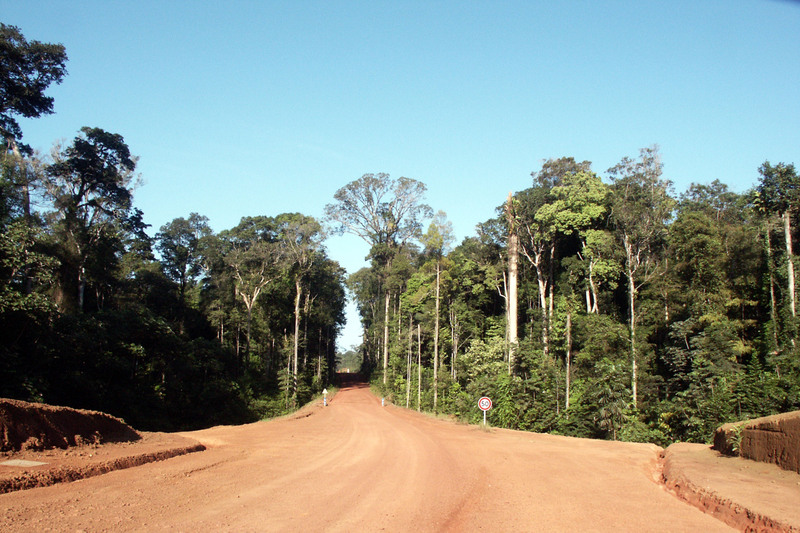
- The early stages of construction as an unpaved road

Route information
- Length: 185 km (115 mi)

Major junctions
- West end: RN1, Cayenne
- RN4, Cayenne – Félix Eboué Airport; RD6, Roura; RD5, Montsinéry; RD50, Cacao; Régina; Saint-Georges
- East end: BR-156, Oiapoque

Location
- Country: France
- Overseas region: French Guiana
- Department: Guyane

Highway system
- Highways in French Guiana

Route nationale 2 (RN2) is a highway in French Guiana, an overseas region and department of France in South America. The highway connects Cayenne with Saint-Georges and has a total length of 185 kilometres (115 mi). The highway provides a direct connection to Brazil via the Oyapock River Bridge.

== Overview ==
The highway starts in Balata, a suburb of Cayenne, at an intersection with Route nationale 1. The road was initially built to connect Cayenne with Cayenne – Félix Eboué Airport.

In the 1970s, the road was extended to Régina as an unpaved road. In the 1990s, work began on extending the road to Saint-Georges. In 2003, the road to Saint-Georges was completed and opened to traffic. In 2014, a grade-separated intersection with Route nationale 1 was constructed.

The Oyapock River Bridge over the Oyapock River was inaugurated on 18 March 2017, linking French Guiana with Brazil.

Traffic volume on Route nationale 2 varies significantly. In 2010, before the bridge opened, the average daily traffic was 23,185 vehicles at Balata, but decreased to 438 vehicles in Saint-Georges.
