= Koursibo =

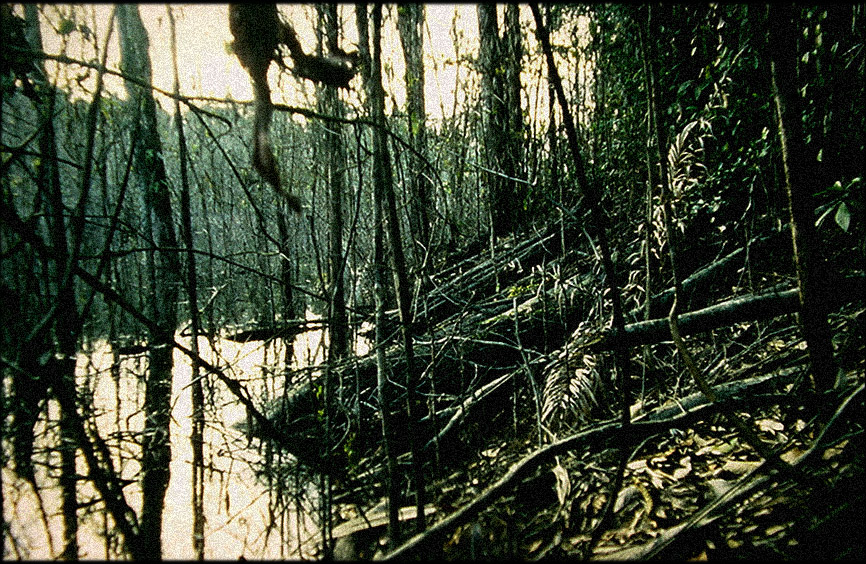

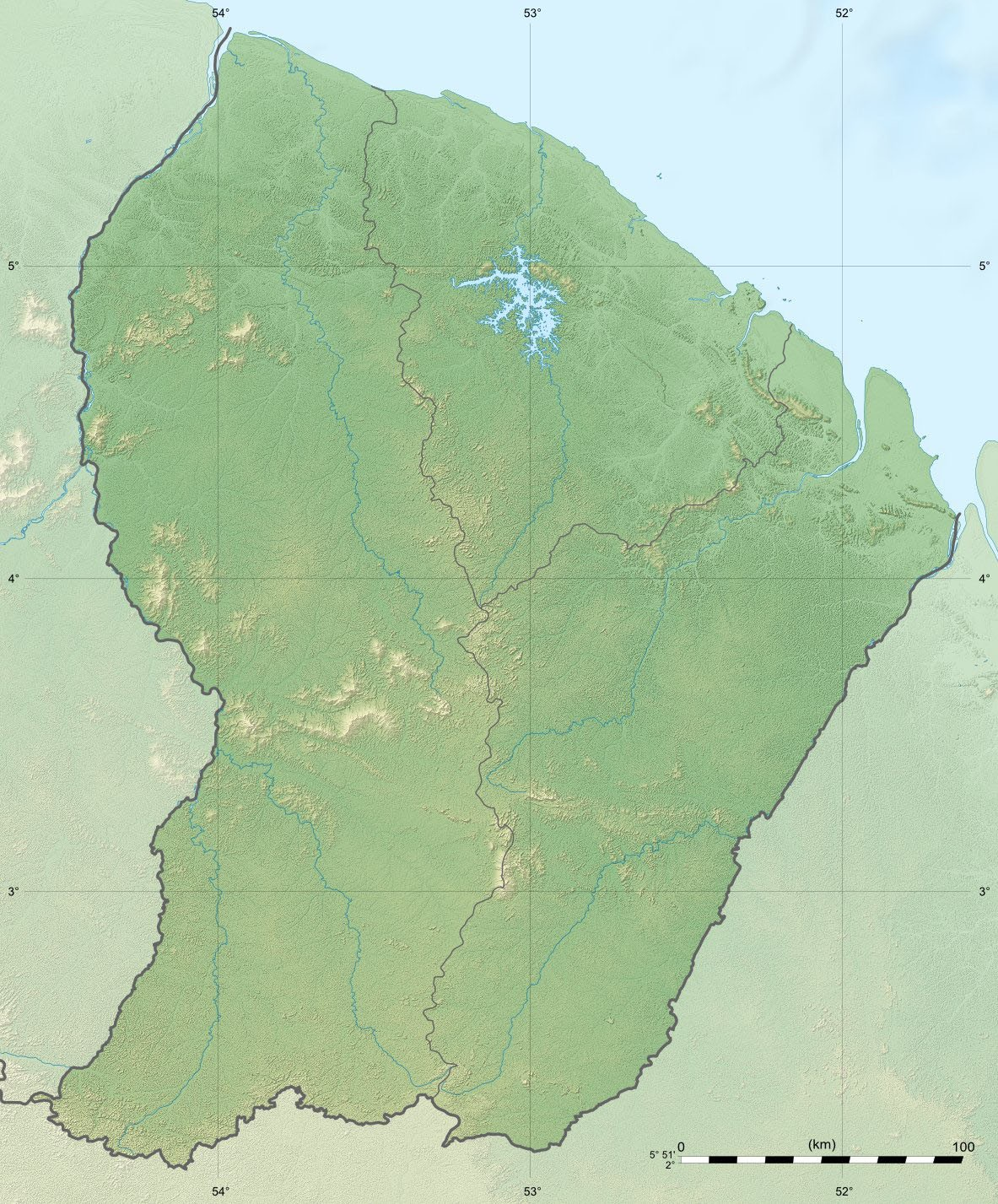

Location
- Country: French Guiana

Physical characteristics
- Source
  - location: French Guiana
  - coordinates: 3.9113°N 53.1554°W
- Mouth
  - location: Sinnamary
  - coordinates: 4°55′25″N 53°00′51″W
- Length: 135 km (84 mi)

Basin features
- Progression: Sinnamary→ Atlantic Ocean

The Koursibo is a 135 km long river in French Guiana. It rises in the centre of the country, flowing north until it reaches the river Sinnamary. Its eventual outflow is into the Atlantic Ocean.
