= Balata, French Guiana =

Balata
- Location in French Guiana
- Coordinates: 4.8866°N 52.3369°W
- Country: France
- Overseas region: French Guiana
- Arrondissement: Cayenne
- Commune: Matoury

Area
  - Total: 0.59 km^{2} (0.23 sq mi)

Population (2018)
  - Total: 2,067
  - Density: 3,500/km^{2} (9,100/sq mi)

Balata (French pronunciation: [balata]) is a town in the commune of Matoury in French Guiana. It is located at the junction of RN1 and RN2, and started as a Haitian shanty town.

== History ==
Balata is named after the nearby Balata Creek. It is located at the junction of RN1 and RN2 in Matoury.

Haitian emigration to French Guiana started in the late 1960s, and accelerated from the late 1980s onwards. At first, they settled among the Haitians already living in Cayenne. Starting in 1995, shanty towns like Balata appeared on the outskirts of the urban area. Many of the settlers either bought or rented the land. By 2005, only a third of the residents were squatting.

The favourable position at the junction of two main roads, triggered suburbanisation in the area. Family Plaza, a 30,000 m^{2} commercial centre with shopping mall, a golf course, and the Lycée Balata, a high school, were constructed in Balata.

Balata, a neighbourhood of Matoury, is listed as a QPV, a problematic urban area needing attention, because of its crime rate

== Bibliography ==
- Romanovski, Zéphirin; Piantoni, Frédéric (2008). "Les stratégies d'accès au logement des Haïtiens dans l'agglomération de Cayenne comme facteurs de restructuration urbaine". Marquages territoriaux et reconnaissance communautaire dans l'outre-mer français. 6 (6). doi:10.4000/espacepolitique.1009.
