= La Trinité National Nature Reserve =

Nature reserve in French Guiana

- IUCN category IV (habitat/species management area)
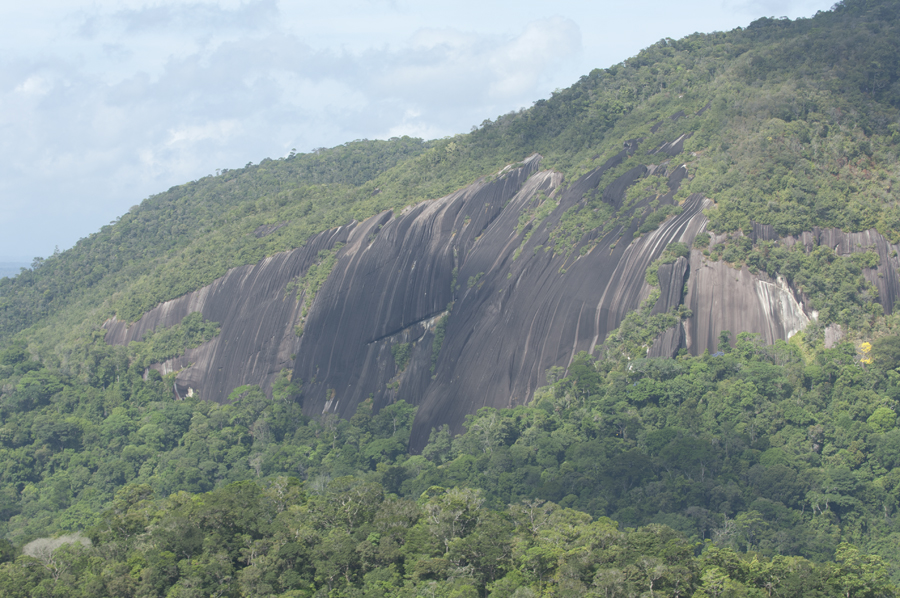
- Inselberg de la Trinité

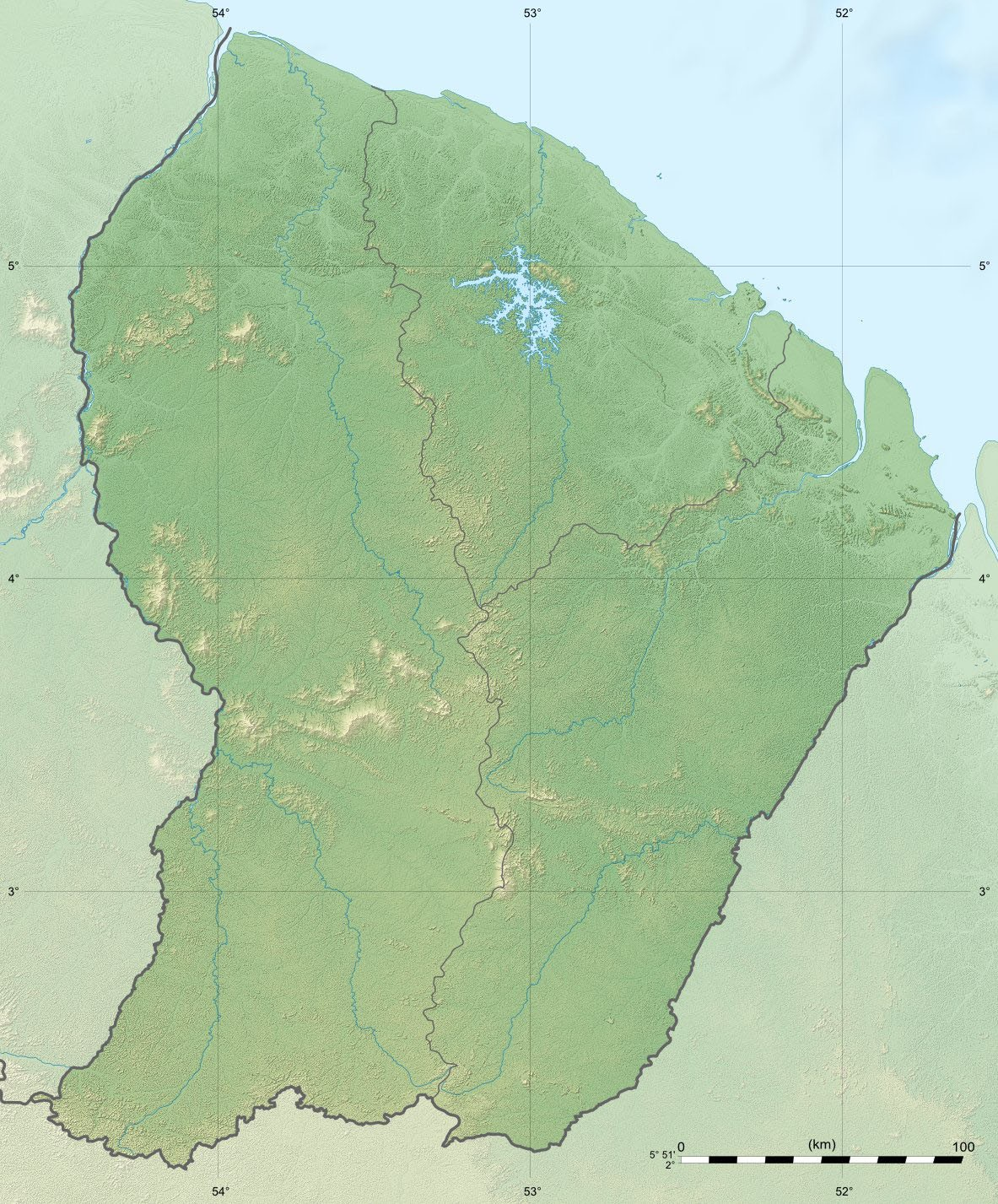
- Location within French Guiana
- Location: French Guiana, France
- Nearest city: Saint-Élie
- Coordinates: 4.5800°N 53.3000°W
- Area: 760 km^{2} (290 sq mi)
- Established: 6 July 1996
- Governing body: National Forests Office
- Website: Reserve-Trinite.fr (in French)

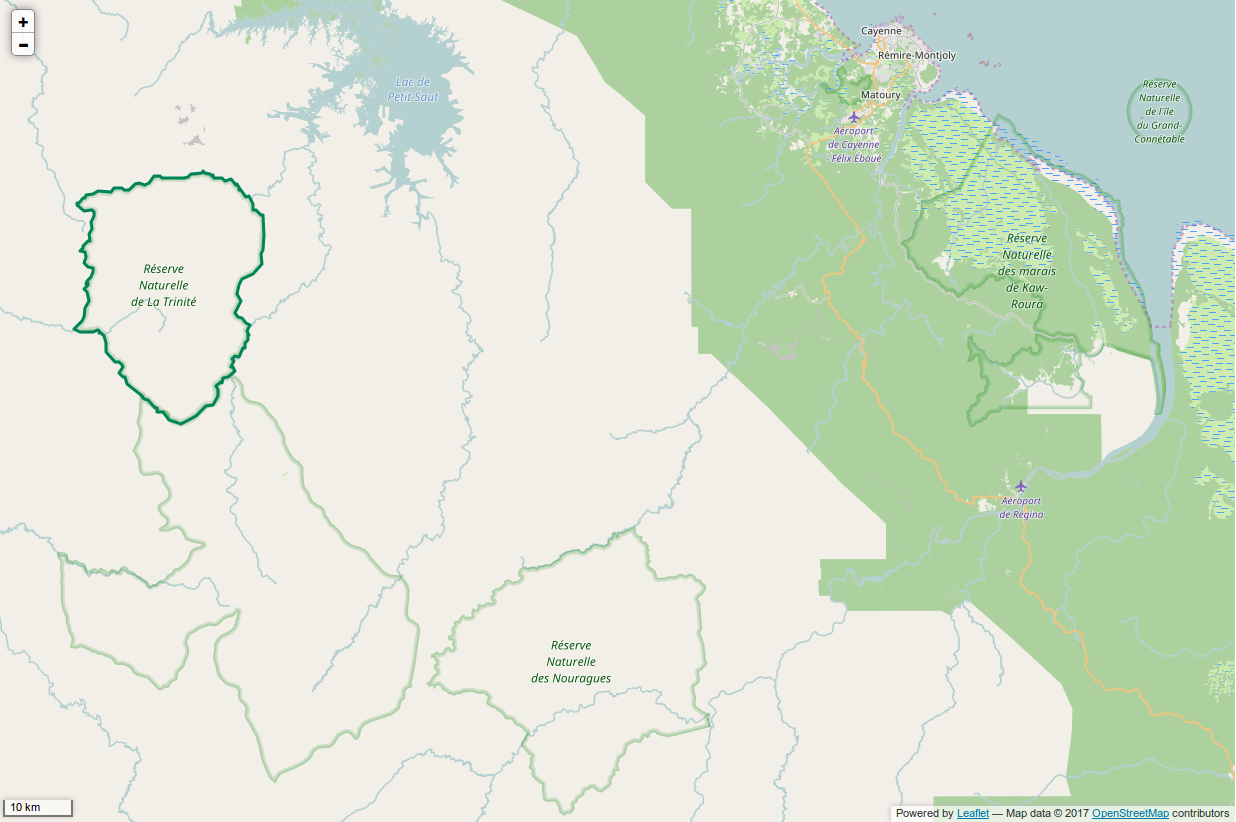
Location of the reserve in French Guiana

La Trinité National Nature Reserve (French: Réserve naturelle nationale de la Trinité) is a French nature reserve in French Guiana created in 1996. It protects 760 square kilometres (290 sq mi) of tropical rainforest in the communes of Mana and Saint-Élie.

== Overview ==
La Trinité was created in 1996, because it is an isolated forest, and no gold mining activities had taken place in the area. The reserve contains mountain forests, plain forest and rock savannas. The reserve contains mountain ranges with tepuis.

In la Trinité more than 57 mammal species have been identified, and more than 300 bird species. In 2011, a new species of Eulepidotis was discovered on Roche Bénitier in the reserve.
