= Sinnamary (river) =

River in French Guiana

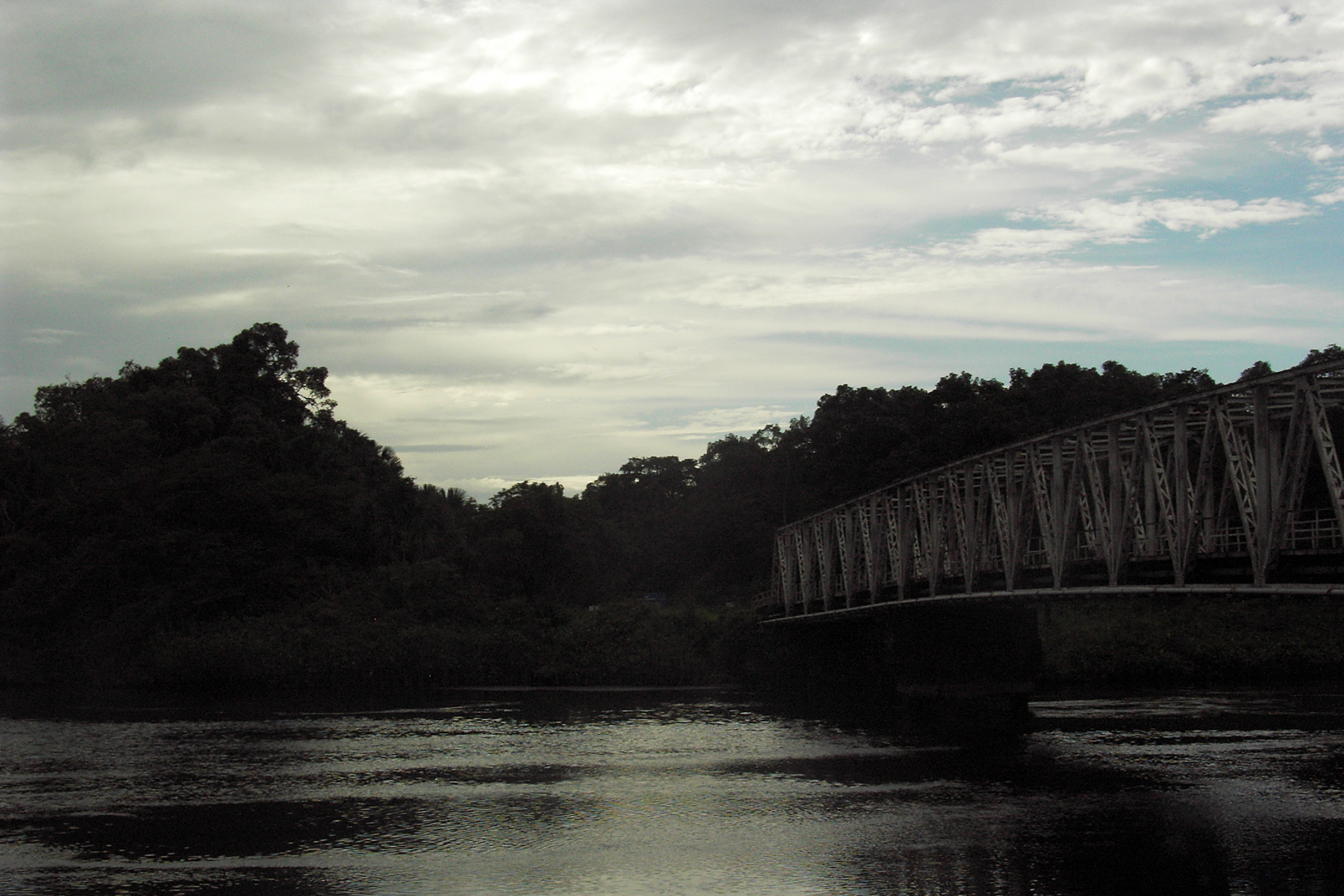

Location
- Country: France
- Territory: French Guiana

Physical characteristics
- Mouth: Atlantic Ocean
  - location: Sinnamary
  - coordinates: 5.4373°N 52.9964°W
- Length: 290 km (180 mi)

Designations

Ramsar Wetland
- Official name: Estuaire du fleuve Sinnamary
- Designated: 15 September 2008
- Reference no.: 1828

The Sinnamary (French pronunciation: [sinamaʁi]) is a river in French Guiana. It is 290 km (180 mi) long. It rises in the center of the country, flowing north until it reaches the Atlantic Ocean near the town of Sinnamary. Its longest tributary is the Koursibo. The Petit-Saut Dam was built near Petit-Saut between 1989 and 1994.
