= Tonnégrande =

Tonnegrande
- Village
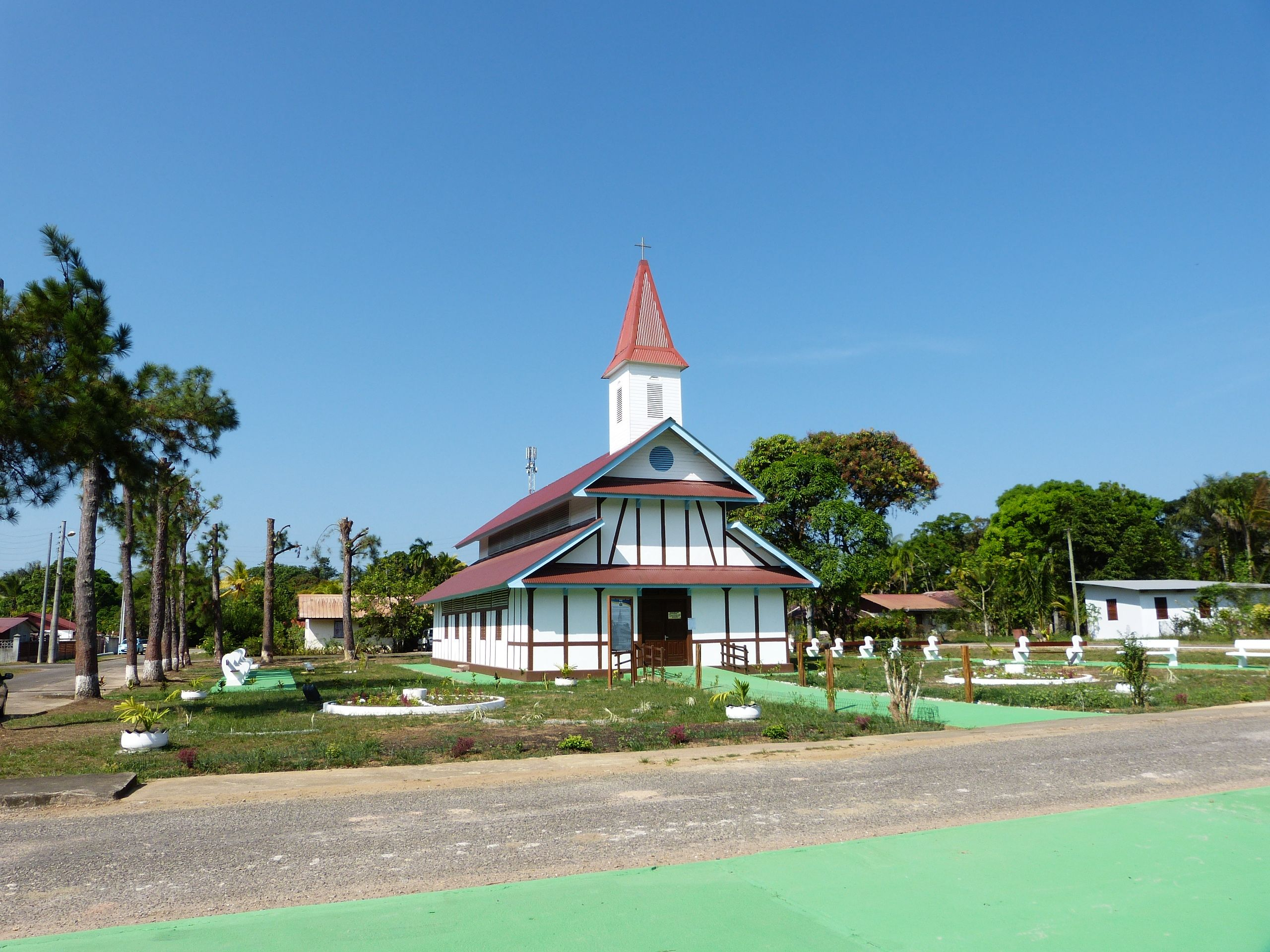
- Church Saint-Louis in Tonnegrande

- Location in French Guiana
- Coordinates: 4°49′52″N 52°26′38″W
- Country: France
- Overseas region: French Guiana
- Arrondissement: Cayenne
- Commune: Montsinéry-Tonnegrande

Tonnegrande (also: Tonnégrande) is a village located in French Guiana and is part of the commune of Montsinéry-Tonnegrande. The town of Tonnegrande was officially established in 1879 on the site of a former plantation.

Historically, Tonnegrande was known for its logging industry, and after the abolition of slavery, it became a hub for gold prospectors attracted to the area. In 1942, the towns of Montsinéry and Tonnegrande were merged into a single commune, with Tonnegrande being the more modest of the two towns.

Today, the economy of Tonnegrande is primarily based on agriculture and forestry.
