= Communauté de communes des Savanes =

Intercommunality in French Guiana, France

- Communauté de communes
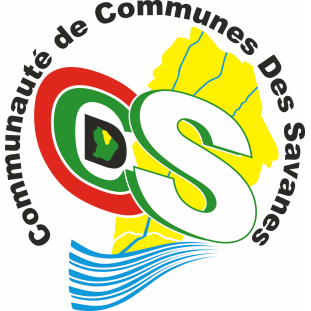

- Location of the Communauté de communes des Savanes in French Guiana
- Country: France
- Overseas region and department: French Guiana{{{region}}}
- No. of communes: {{{nbcomm}}}
- Established: January 2011

Government
  - President: François Ringuet
- Area: 11,942 km^{2} (4,611 sq mi)
- Population (2018): 29,843
  - Density: 2.4990/km^{2} (6.4724/sq mi)
- Website: www.ccdsguyane.fr

The Communauté de communes des Savanes (CCDS) is a communauté de communes, an intercommunal structure in the French département d'outre-mer of French Guiana. It was created in January 2011, and its seat is Sinnamary. Its area is 11,942 km^{2}, and its population was 29,843 in 2018.

== Composition ==
The communauté de communes des Savanes comprises the following communes:

List of communes of the Communauté de communes des Savanes
Name	INSEE code	Demonym	Area (km^{2})	Population (2017)	Density (per km^{2})
Kourou	97304	Kouroucien	2,160	25,685	12
Iracoubo	97303		2,762	1,799	0.65
Saint-Élie	97358		5,680	242	0.04
Sinnamary	97312		1,340	2,919	2.2

== Administration ==
The communauté de communes is led by an indirectly elected President along with a conseil communautaire composed of 11 Vice-Presidents and 23 conseillers communautaires.

=== President ===
List of presidents of the Communauté de communes des Savanes
In office		Name	Party	Capacity	Ref.
February 2011	April 2014	Jean-Claude Madeleine		Mayor of Sinnamary (2008–present)	
April 2014	present	François Ringuet		Member of the General Council of French Guiana (2011–2015); Mayor of Kourou (2014–present)	

=== Administrative seat ===
The administrative seat of the Communauté de communes des Savanes is located in Kourou at 1 rue Raymond Cresson.
