= Saint-Nazaire, French Guiana =

Saint-Nazaire
- Village
- Location in French Guiana
- Coordinates: 4.92910°N 53.19682°W
- Country: France
- Overseas region: French Guiana
- Arrondissement: Cayenne
- Commune: Saint-Élie

Saint-Nazaire is a village in French Guiana, in the commune of Saint-Élie on the Tiger Creek. In 1873, gold was discovered in Saint-Élie. The mines were in the middle of the rain forest with no river connection to the outside world. In 1884 construction began on a railway line to Gare Tigre near Saint-Nazaire. The railway line needed frequent repairs, and had over 100 bridges. In 1990, the railway line was abandoned when a road opened.
