= Inini =

French Guiana inland territory, 1930-1946

Coordinates: 3°N 53°W

Territory of Inini Territoire de l'Inini
- 1930–1946
- Flag

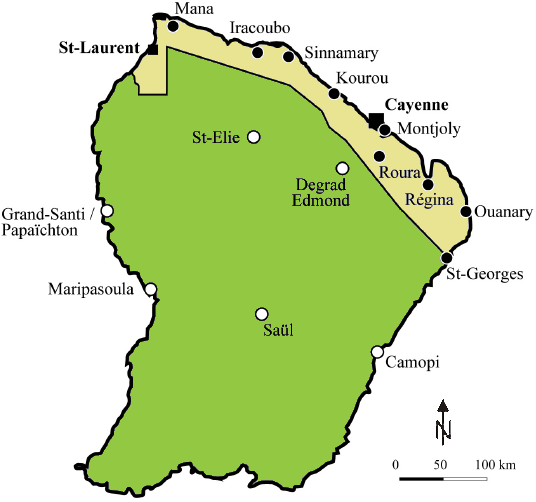
- Inini (green) and French Guiana (beige)
- Status: French colony
- Capital: Saint-Élie
- Common languages: French
- Historical era: Interbellum · World War II
  - Separated from French Guiana: 6 June 1930
  - Reintegrated: 19 March 1946

Population
  - 1946: 5,024
- Currency: French franc
Preceded by	Succeeded by
French Guiana	French Guiana

Inini was an inland territory of French Guiana, administered separately between 6 June 1930 and 19 March 1946, after which all of French Guiana became a department of France. The territory remained governed as a special entity, until 17 March 1969 when it was dissolved into communes, and subject to regular government. Its capital was Saint-Élie. The population of the territory consisted of Amerindians, Maroons, and gold prospectors. The district was named after the river Inini, a major river in the interior of French Guiana which runs east to west, unlike the other major rivers which run south to north.

== History ==
The purpose of the colony was to develop the interior separately from the coastal area around Cayenne. The colony came into effect on 6 June 1930, and was mainly a military affair. The territory was ruled by decree first by the governor of French Guiana and later by the prefect. Initially only three services were offered: water management, forest management, and mines.

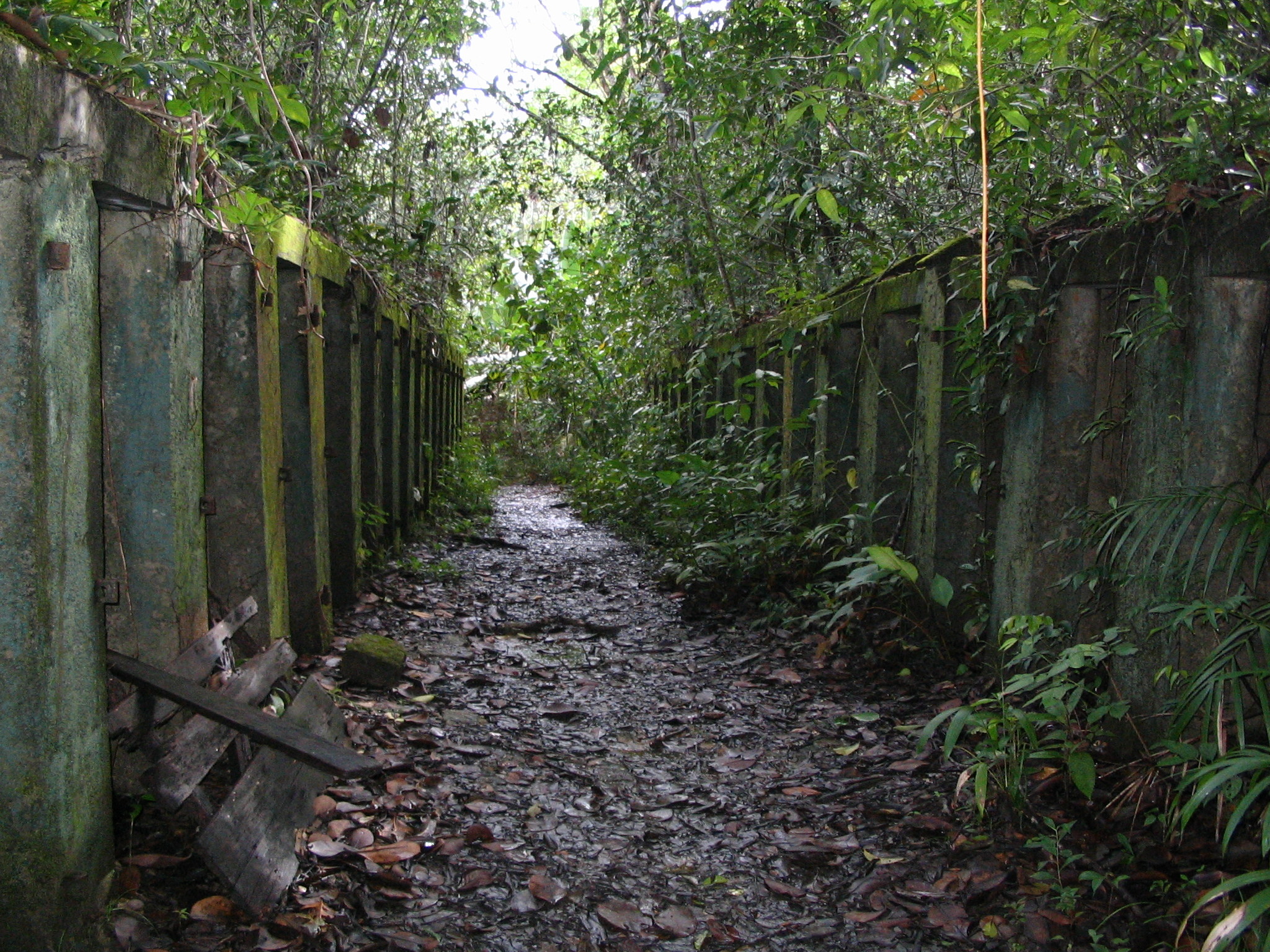
Prison of the Annamites (2005)

In 1930, a total of seven military officers and nine gendarmes were stationed in the territory. The main focus was on the legal gold mining companies, and the difficult access to the mines in the jungle. In 1931, a labour force consisting of 535 Annamite prisoners who had revolted against French rule in Indochina were brought in to make the territory accessible. Senegalese Tirailleurs were used to guard and oversee the prisoners. In 1936, the governor informed Paris that the project was successful, because the interior could soon be opened for colonisation. In 1937, the prisoners at Camp Crique Anguille revolted.

In 1941, American troops were stationed in Suriname to protect the colony and its bauxite industry, which was primarily American-owned. One year later, Brazil declared war on Germany. Inini was part of Vichy France, a neutral state associated with Nazi Germany through the Armistice of 22 June 1940, and now found itself squeezed between two hostile countries, therefore the main effort of the administration was guarding the borders until 16 March 1943 when Inini sided with Free France. On 6 December 1944, the prisoner camps were abandoned and the Annamites returned to the normal prisons. The first group was released in July 1946, however the last group had to wait until August 1953.

The plan to develop the territory did not work out, owing to the difficulties of railroad construction in the interior. The ruins of the three prisons used may still be seen. In 1944, the Brazzaville Conference was held among Free French leaders which promised all citizens of France's colonies equal rights with French citizens after the war. Therefore, on 19 March 1946 all of French Guiana became a department of France; however, Inini would be administered separately, because it was lacking basic services like health care and education. On 17 March 1969, the territory was dissolved into communes, and subject to regular democratic government.

== Postage stamps ==
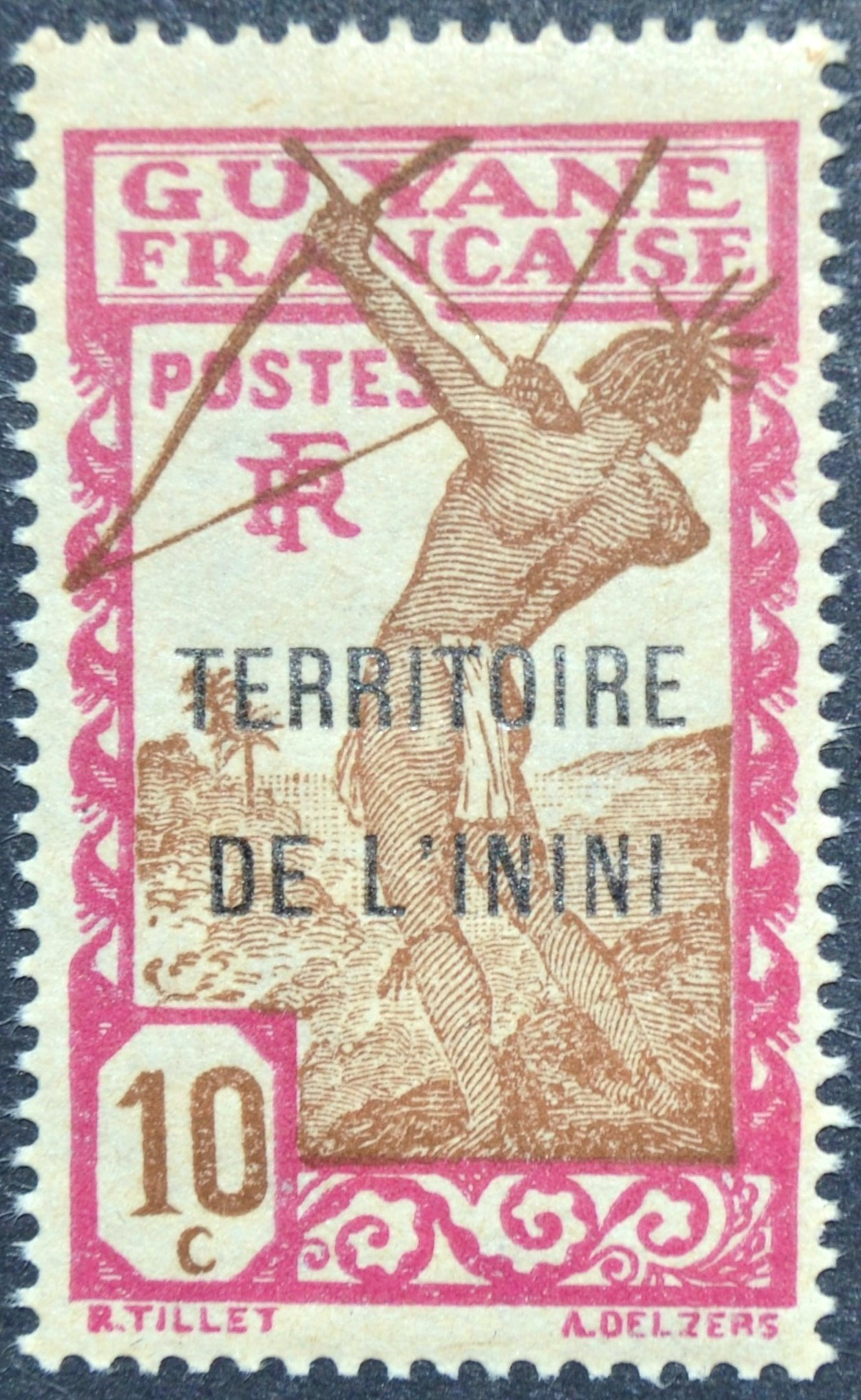
A 1932 stamp of Inini

During this period, the postage stamps of French Guiana were overprinted with several variations on "TERRITOIRE DE L'ININI" and the omnibus issues for the Colonial Arts Exhibition in 1937 and the New York World's Fair in 1939 included stamps inscribed "ININI". Despite the limited audience, the stamps of Inini are commonly available at minimal prices today.

== See also ==
- Former colonies in South America
- French colonization of the Americas

== Bibliography ==
- Donet-Vincent, Danielle (2001). "Les "bagnes" des Indochinois en Guyane (1931-1963)". Persée. Outre-Mers. Revue d'histoire (in French).
- Thabouillot, Gérard (2011). "Être chef de poste en Inini (1930-1969)". Persée. Outre-Mers. Revue d'histoire (in French). ISSN 2275-4954.
