= Montsinéry-Tonnegrande =

Commune in French Guiana, France

- Commune
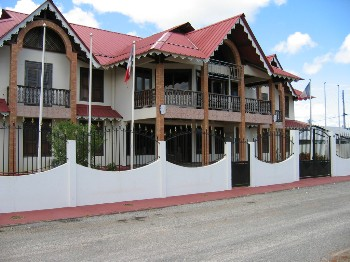
- A view of the town hall of Montsinéry

- Coat of arms

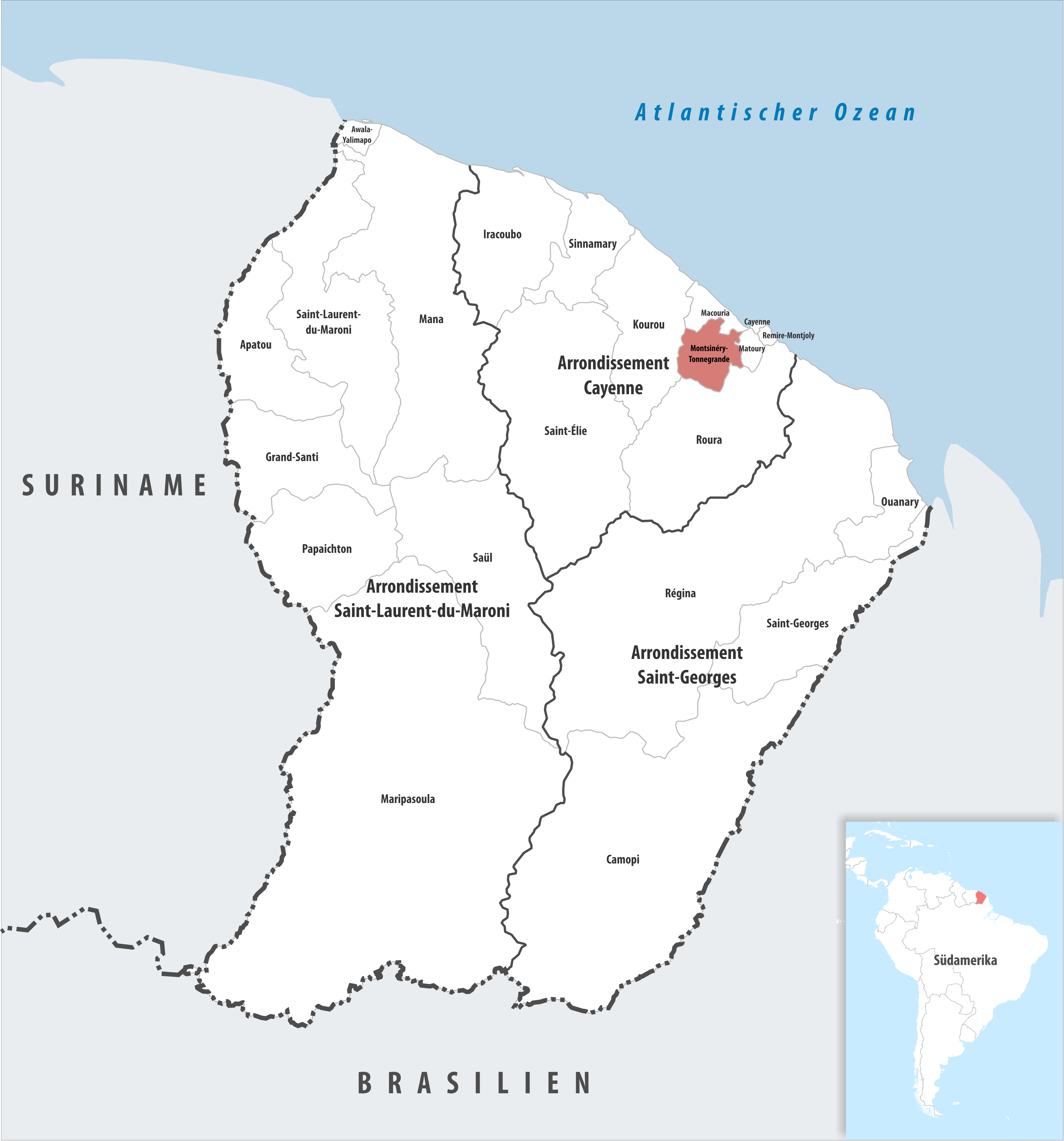
- Location of the commune (in red) within French Guiana
- Location of Montsinéry-Tonnegrande
- Coordinates: 4°53′31″N 52°29′36″W
- Country: France
- Overseas region and department: French Guiana
- Arrondissement: Cayenne
- Intercommunality: CA Centre Littoral

Government
  - Mayor (2020–2026): Patrick Lecante
- Area^{1}: 634 km^{2} (245 sq mi)
- Highest elevation: 112 m (367 ft)
- Lowest elevation: 0 m (0 ft)
- Population (2023): 3,626
  - Density: 5.72/km^{2} (14.8/sq mi)
- Time zone: UTC−03:00
- INSEE/Postal code: 97313 /97356
- ^{1} French Land Register data, which excludes lakes, ponds, glaciers > 1 km^{2} (0.386 sq mi or 247 acres) and river estuaries.

Montsinéry-Tonnegrande (French pronunciation: [mɔ̃sineʁi tɔneɡʁɑ̃d]; often unofficially spelled Montsinéry-Tonnégrande; French Guianese Creole: Mousinéri-Tonnégrann) is a commune of French Guiana, an overseas region and department of France located in South America.

Montsinéry-Tonnegrande is to the south-west of Cayenne. It contains a botanical garden, and various walking trails. Prison of the Annamites, an internment camp for Indochinese prisoners, was located 38 km outside of town, and connected with a railroad. The camp was in operation between 1931 and 1944.

The commune was previously known as Tonnegrande-Montsinéry, but on 27 March 1969 the name was officially changed into Montsinéry-Tonnegrande.

== Geography ==
The city has 2 population centres spaced by 22 km:

- Montsinéry
- Tonnegrande

It used to be isolated to the close main city of French Guiana, Cayenne, but now the RD5 road opens up the city.

Montsinéry is surrounded by rivers and inundated fields. It is located at the convergence of Timouthou and Montsinéry rivers.

== History ==
Montsinéry-Tonnegrande used to be occupied by settlers. They used to run the sugar cane industry and to farm a spices plantation. Amerindians are also present in the city.

The 2 burgs developed with creole houses. In 1836, the population was made up of 1102 slaves and 167 free inhabitants feeding mainly on fishing. In 1878, Montsinnéry and Tonnegrande were gathered in a single municipal entity. In 1941 the Montsinnéry-Tonnegrande city was officially created.

Montsinéry-Tonnegrande is also known for its prisons. Indeed, in 1848, a first penitentiary was built and then closed at the end of the 19th century.

In 1931, a new prison was built, called "Bagne des Anamites", in order to receive Indochinese opponents to the French presence in Indochina. The prisoners men performed manual work and built in particular the railroad into the interior. In December 1944, the camp was closed.

== Population ==
Historical population
Year	Pop.	±% p.a.
1967	333	—
1974	377	+1.79%
1982	333	−1.54%
1990	500	+5.21%
1999	1,037	+8.44%
2007	1,958	+8.27%
2012	2,483	+4.87%
2017	2,589	+0.84%
2023	3,626	+5.77%
Source: INSEE

== Transmitter site ==
Montsinéry is home to a shortwave transmission facility operated by the TDF Group that is designed to target listeners in the Americas and West Africa. The site is capable of DRM digital shortwave transmissions. An image of the rotatable curtain array antenna in Montsinéry can be found by searching Flickr for "Montsinery antenne". One of their broadcasting frequencies is the 7335 kHz slot that CHU (Canada) recently abandoned.

Voice of Russia began transmitting to North America from Montsinéry — its first transmissions from the western hemisphere since the early 1990s (it previously broadcast from Havana).

The transmitter site shut down in 2013 due to lack of listeners.

== Activities ==
Montsinéry is the only place in French Guiana where you can find oysters. It is also an eco tourism location offering water bikes on the river and horse rides.

== See also ==
- Communes of French Guiana
