= Petit-Saut Dam =

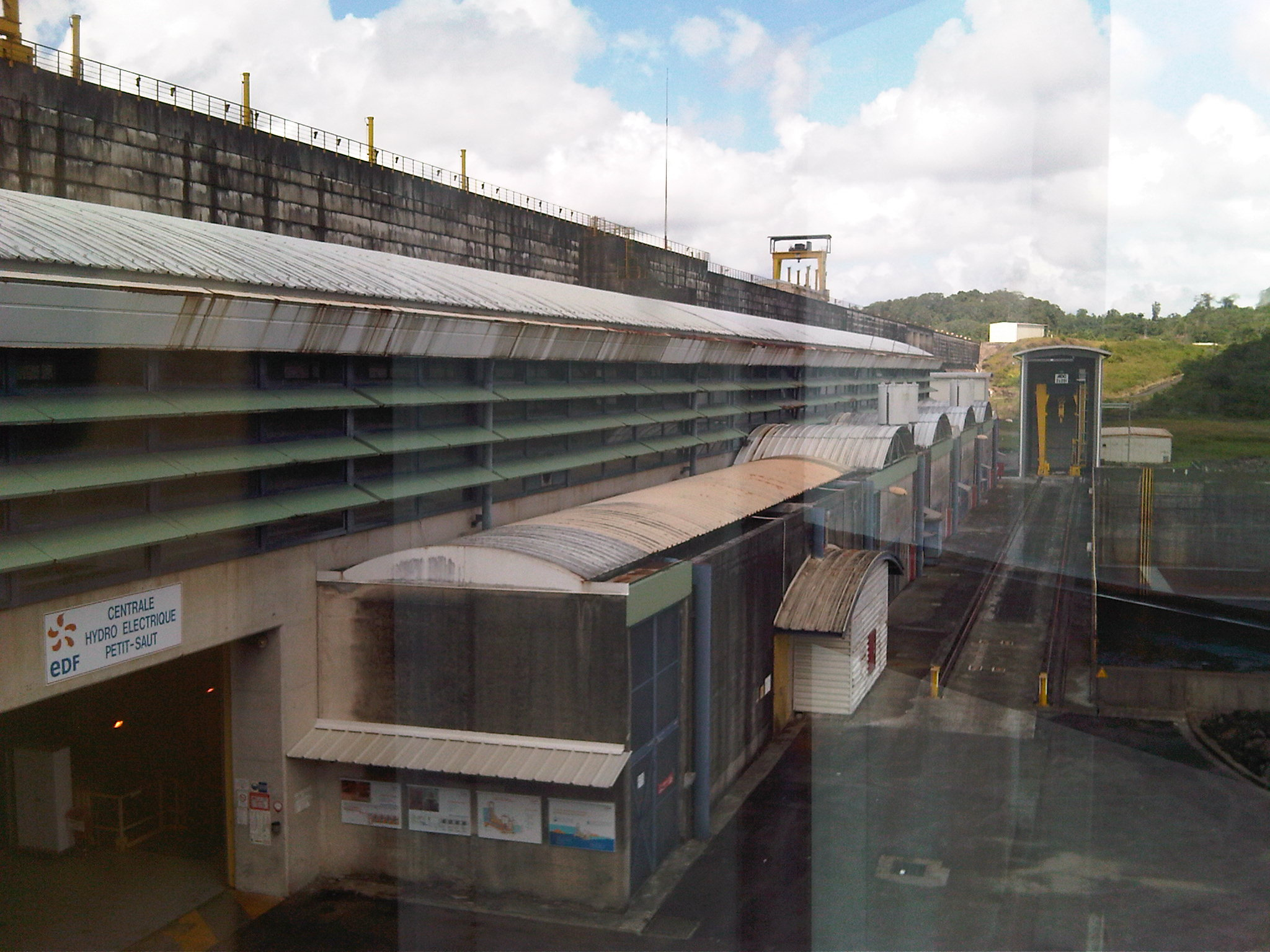
- Petit-Saut Dam, 2011.

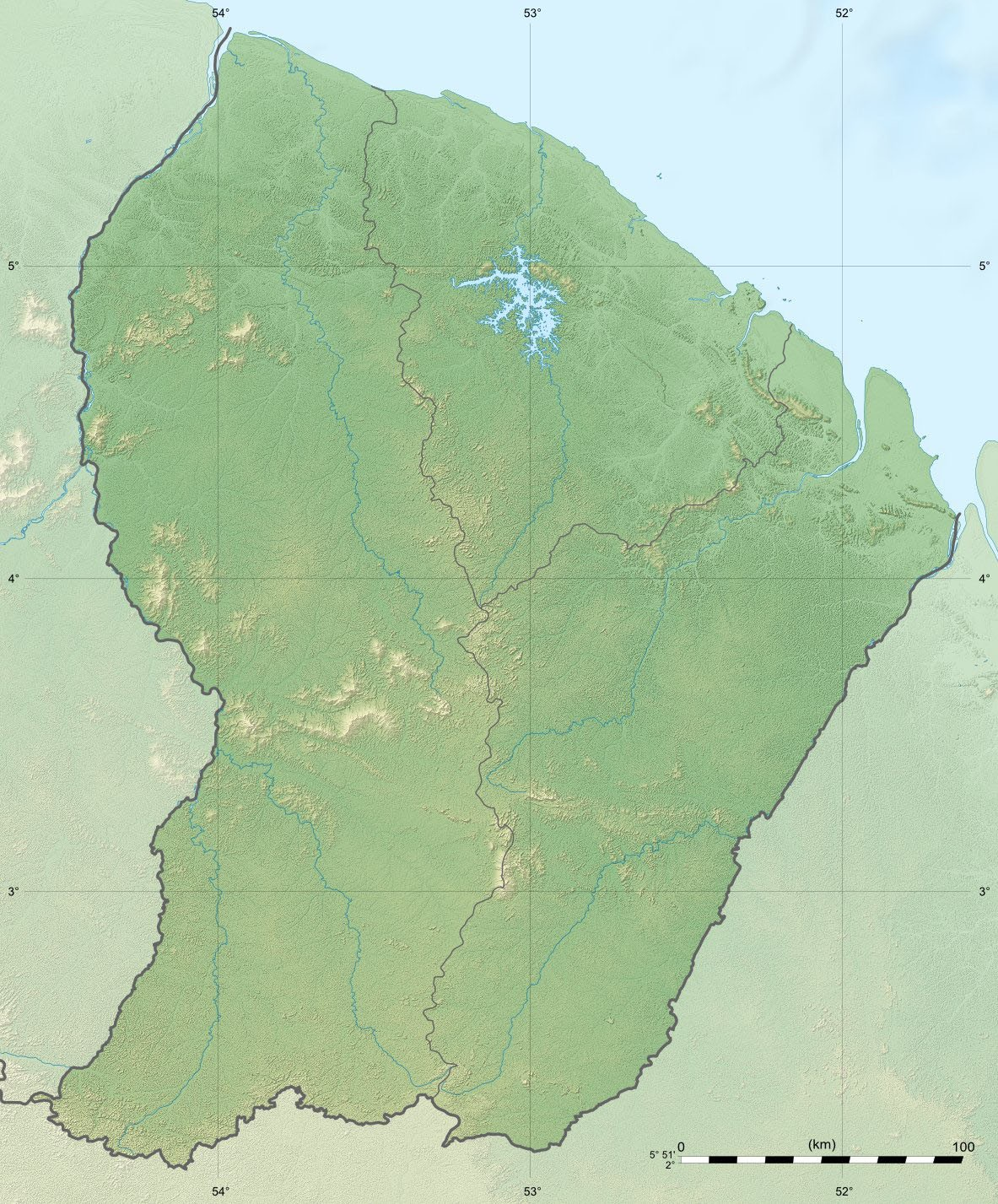
- Location within French Guiana
- Country: France
- Location: Sinnamary, French Guiana
- Coordinates: 5°3′45.39″N 53°2′51.28″W
- Purpose: Power
- Status: Operational
- Construction began: 1989
- Opening date: 1993; 33 years ago
- Owner: Électricité de France

Dam and spillways
- Type of dam: Gravity, roller-compacted concrete
- Impounds: Sinnamary River
- Height: 48 m (157 ft)
- Length: 740 m (2,430 ft)
- Dam volume: 410,000 m^{3} (540,000 cu yd)

Reservoir
- Creates: Petit-Saut Lake
- Total capacity: 3,500,000,000 m^{3} (2,800,000 acre⋅ft)
- Surface area: 365 km^{2} (141 mi^{2})

Power Station
- Commission date: January 1994-1995
- Turbines: 4 x 29 MW Kaplan-type
- Installed capacity: 116 MW

The Petit-Saut Dam is a gravity dam on the Sinnamary River about 36 km (22 mi) south of Sinnamary in French Guiana. The primary purpose of the dam is to produce hydroelectric power and it supports a 116 MW power station. Construction on the dam and power station began in July 1989 and placement of concrete for the dam started in July 1992. The dam was complete in February 1993 and the first generator was operational in January 1994. The last went online in 1995. It is owned by Électricité de France. Construction of the dam and impounding of its large 3,500,000,000 m^{3} (2,800,000 acre⋅ft) reservoir led to several environmental issues that continue to be monitored and addressed. These issues include deforestation, greenhouse gases and water deoxidation.
