= Saint-Georges, French Guiana =

Commune in French Guiana, France

Saint-Georges
- Subprefecture and commune
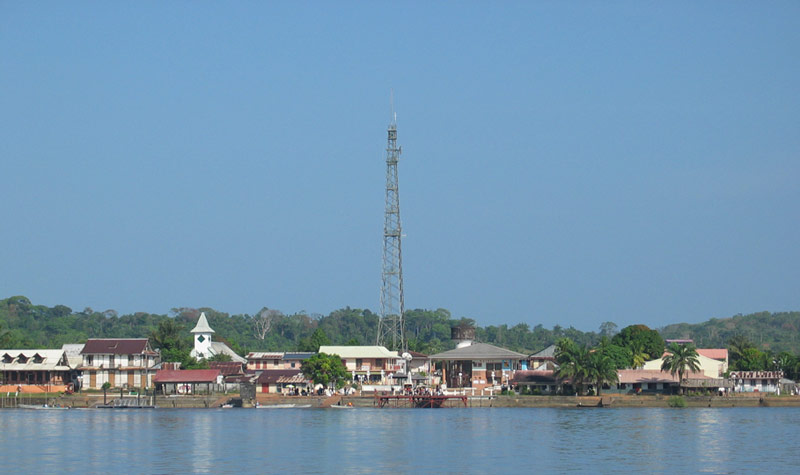
- A view of Saint-George from the river

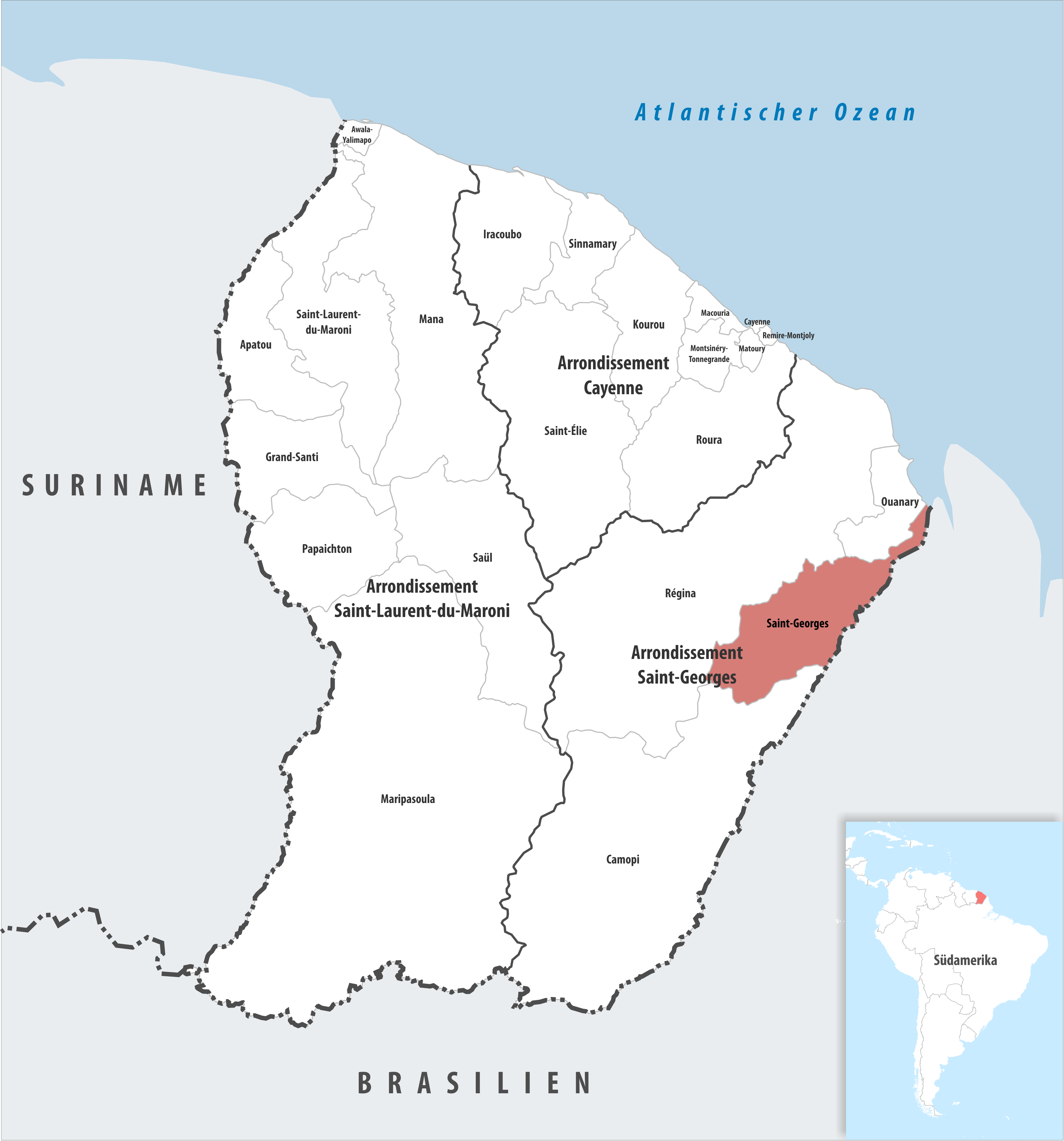
- Location of the commune (in red) within French Guiana
- Location of Saint-Georges
- Coordinates: 3°53′20″N 51°48′04″W
- Country: France
- Overseas region and department: French Guiana
- Arrondissement: Saint-Georges
- Intercommunality: Est Guyanais

Government
  - Mayor (2020–2026): Georges Elfort (DVG)
- Area^{1}: 2,320 km^{2} (900 sq mi)
- Population (2023): 4,915
  - Density: 2.12/km^{2} (5.49/sq mi)
- Time zone: UTC−03:00
- INSEE/Postal code: 97308 /97313
- ^{1} French Land Register data, which excludes lakes, ponds, glaciers > 1 km^{2} (0.386 sq mi or 247 acres) and river estuaries.

Saint-Georges (French pronunciation: [sɛ̃ ʒɔʁʒ]; French Guianese Creole: Senjòrj; sometimes unofficially called Saint-Georges-de-l'Oyapock; Portuguese: São Jorge do Oiapoque) is a commune of French Guiana, an overseas region and department of France located in South America. It lies on the Oyapock River (which forms the border with Brazil), opposite the Brazilian town of Oiapoque. The town contains a town hall, a French Foreign Legion detachment, and some hotels (the main ones being Le Tamarin, Coz Calè and the Chez Modestine). Saint-Georges has been one of the three sub-prefectures of French Guiana and the seat of the Arrondissement of Saint-Georges since October 2022.

== History ==
Several short-lived colonies had been founded on the Oyapock River. In 1604, Charles Leigh founded Oyapoc for Great-Britain. After a mutiny, the colony was abandoned in 1606. In 1620, Roger North tried again, but was forced to abandon the colony in 1629. In February 1677, John Apricius founded a Dutch colony, and constructed Fort Orange. In June 1677, they were attacked by the French, and shipped back to the Netherlands. In 1723 or 1724, Fort Saint-Louis was constructed at or near the Dutch fort. In 1734, a Jesuit mission was established at Fort Saint-Louis. In 1744, they were attacked by Great-Britain, and the settlement was abandoned.

The town was founded on 23 April 1853 as a penal colony and named after a Dutch coin of Saint George which was discovered at the site. The camp was closed down in 1863. The discovery of gold in 1885 in the Camopi River revived the hamlet and the town was officially created in 1947.

The commune is one of the main settlements of the Palikur Amerindians. About 500 Palikur live in the commune. They live in neighbourhoods built specifically constructed for them in the main town, and the village of Trois-Palétuviers.

== Geography ==
=== Climate ===
Saint-Georges has a tropical monsoon climate (Köppen climate classification Am). The average annual temperature in Saint-Georges is 26.9 °C (80.4 °F). The average annual rainfall is 3,312.4 mm (130.41 in) with May as the wettest month. The temperatures are highest on average in October, at around 28.0 °C (82.4 °F), and lowest in January, at around 26.1 °C (79.0 °F). The highest temperature ever recorded in Saint-Georges was 37.0 °C (98.6 °F) on 22 October 2015; the coldest temperature ever recorded was 17.2 °C (63.0 °F) on 8 November 1958.

Climate data for Saint-Georges (1991–2020 averages, extremes 1955−present)
Month	Jan	Feb	Mar	Apr	May	Jun	Jul	Aug	Sep	Oct	Nov	Dec	Year
Record high °C (°F)	33.3 (91.9)	33.4 (92.1)	34.6 (94.3)	34.1 (93.4)	34.5 (94.1)	33.8 (92.8)	34.5 (94.1)	35.8 (96.4)	36.4 (97.5)	37.0 (98.6)	36.4 (97.5)	35.2 (95.4)	37.0 (98.6)
Mean daily maximum °C (°F)	29.8 (85.6)	29.7 (85.5)	30.2 (86.4)	30.3 (86.5)	30.3 (86.5)	30.9 (87.6)	31.6 (88.9)	32.8 (91.0)	33.8 (92.8)	34.2 (93.6)	33.2 (91.8)	31.1 (88.0)	31.5 (88.7)
Daily mean °C (°F)	26.1 (79.0)	26.2 (79.2)	26.4 (79.5)	26.6 (79.9)	26.7 (80.1)	26.7 (80.1)	26.8 (80.2)	27.4 (81.3)	27.8 (82.0)	28.0 (82.4)	27.6 (81.7)	26.8 (80.2)	26.9 (80.4)
Mean daily minimum °C (°F)	22.5 (72.5)	22.6 (72.7)	22.6 (72.7)	23.0 (73.4)	23.1 (73.6)	22.6 (72.7)	22.1 (71.8)	22.0 (71.6)	21.8 (71.2)	21.8 (71.2)	22.1 (71.8)	22.5 (72.5)	22.4 (72.3)
Record low °C (°F)	17.5 (63.5)	17.4 (63.3)	17.5 (63.5)	17.9 (64.2)	18.5 (65.3)	18.8 (65.8)	18.5 (65.3)	17.5 (63.5)	17.5 (63.5)	18.2 (64.8)	17.2 (63.0)	17.4 (63.3)	17.2 (63.0)
Average precipitation mm (inches)	394.3 (15.52)	390.0 (15.35)	375.9 (14.80)	471.5 (18.56)	545.9 (21.49)	331.2 (13.04)	207.7 (8.18)	101.5 (4.00)	41.1 (1.62)	44.3 (1.74)	114.7 (4.52)	294.3 (11.59)	3,312.4 (130.41)
Average precipitation days (≥ 1.0 mm)	24.3	21.3	21.8	22.6	26.9	23.6	19.2	9.6	4.3	5.1	11.4	20.5	210.6
Mean monthly sunshine hours	93.0	82.5	100.5	—	103.1	126.3	176.3	221.9	238.4	232.8	177.2	138.6	—
Source 1: Météo-France
Source 2: Meteociel (sun 1981-2010)

== Transport ==
An asphalted road from Saint-Georges to Régina was opened in 2004, completing the National Road 2 (RN2) from Cayenne (the préfecture and largest city of French Guiana) to the Brazilian border and ending the isolation of Saint-Georges. It is now possible to drive on a fully paved road from Saint-Laurent-du-Maroni on the Surinamese border to Saint-Georges on the Brazilian border.

Following an international treaty between France and Brazil signed in 15 July 2005, the Oyapock River Bridge was built, with construction completed in 2011. It was opened for use in March 2017. This bridge is the first land crossing ever opened between France and Brazil, and indeed between French Guiana and the rest of the world (there exists no other bridge crossing the Oyapock River, and no bridge crossing the Maroni River marking the border with Suriname). With the opening of the bridge, it is now possible to drive uninterrupted from Cayenne to Macapá (on the Amazon River), the capital of the state of Amapá in Brazil.

Saint-Georges is served by the Saint-Georges-de-l'Oyapock Airport.

== Population ==
Historical population Saint-Georges

Year	Pop.	±% p.a.
1961	649	—
1967	817	+3.90%
1974	1,044	+3.56%
1982	1,199	+1.89%
1990	1,523	+3.03%

Year	Pop.	±% p.a.
1999	2,153	+3.93%
2007	3,605	+6.82%
2012	3,855	+1.35%
2017	4,131	+1.39%
2023	4,915	+2.94%

Source: INSEE

== Consular representation ==
Brazil has a Consulate in Saint Georges de l'Oyapock.

== See also ==
- Communes of French Guiana
