= Sinnamary =

Commune in French Guiana, France

- Commune
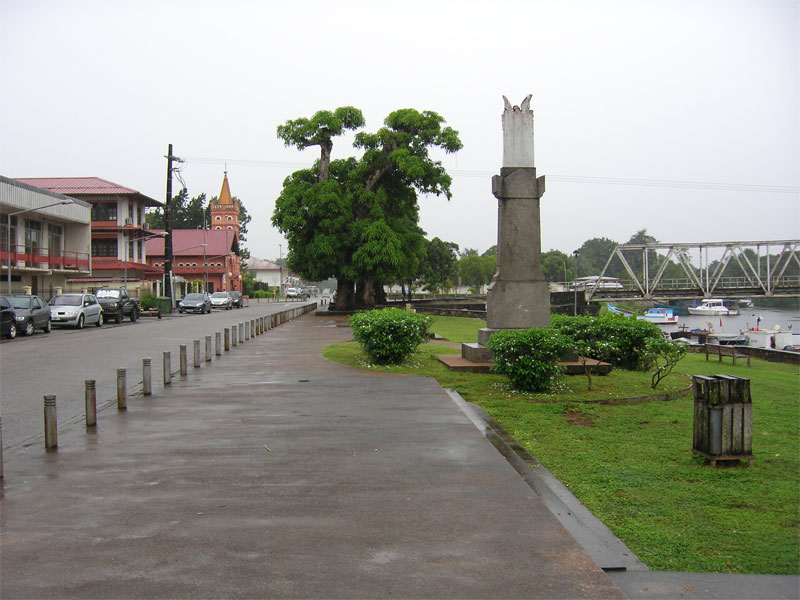

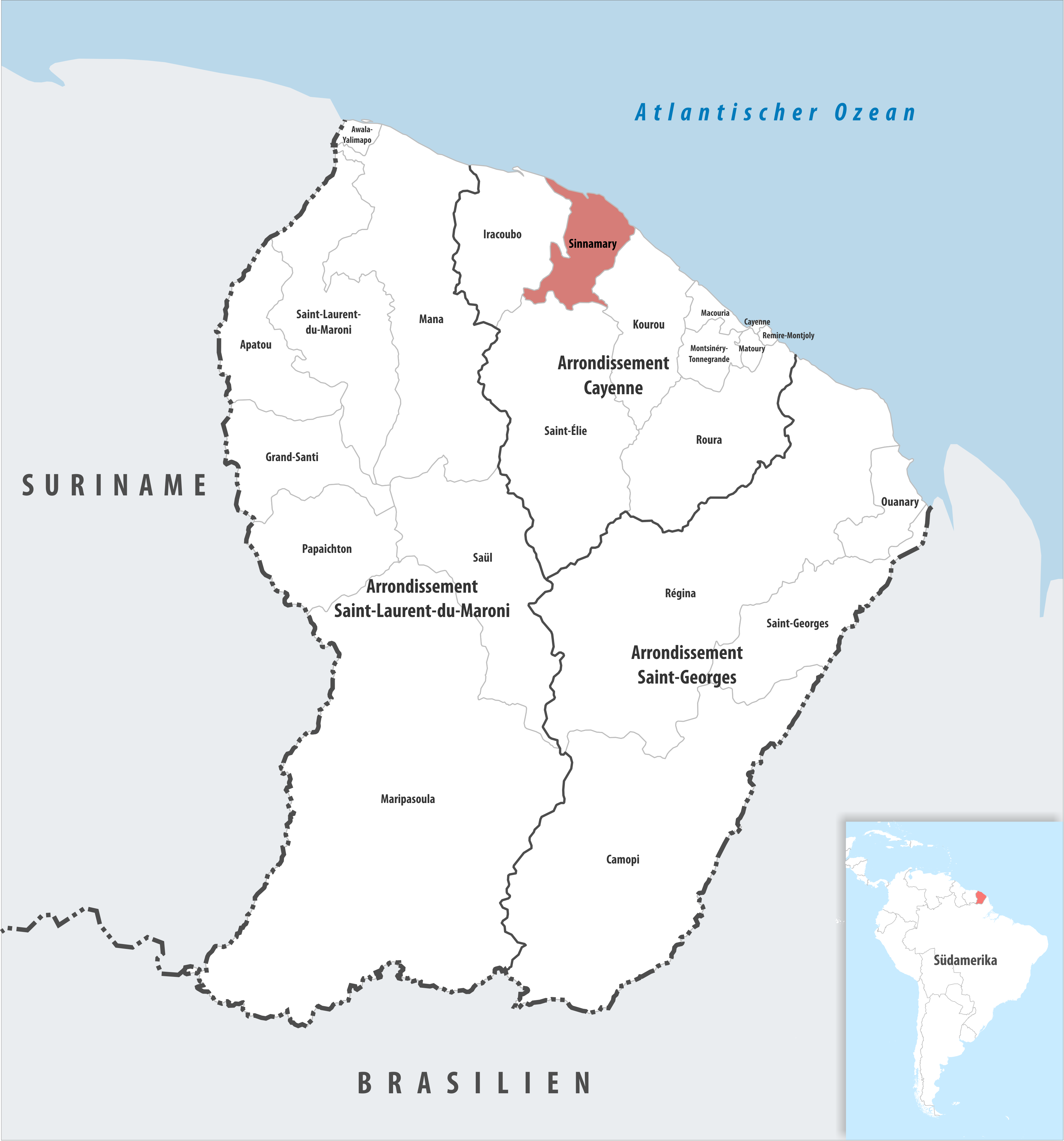
- Location of the commune (in red) within French Guiana
- Location of Sinnamary
- Coordinates: 5°22′39″N 52°57′35″W
- Country: France
- Overseas region and department: French Guiana
- Arrondissement: Cayenne
- Intercommunality: CC des Savanes

Government
  - Mayor (2020–2026): Michel-Ange Jeremie
- Area^{1}: 1,340 km^{2} (520 sq mi)
- Population (2023): 2,756
  - Density: 2.06/km^{2} (5.33/sq mi)
- Time zone: UTC−03:00
- INSEE/Postal code: 97312 /97315
- ^{1} French Land Register data, which excludes lakes, ponds, glaciers > 1 km^{2} (0.386 sq mi or 247 acres) and river estuaries.

Sinnamary (French pronunciation: [sinamaʁi]; French Guianese Creole: Sennmari) is a town and commune on the coast of French Guiana, between Kourou and Iracoubo. Sinnamary was the second French settlement founded in French Guiana: the town was founded in 1664.

Sinnamary lies on the Sinnamary River and is home to the Guianan Soyuz launch site. In 1792, the first prison for priests and political enemies was constructed in Sinnamary. The town contains an Indonesian community, as well as a Galibi Amerindian community. Both communities produce artwork and jewellery that can be purchased. The main hotel in Sinnamary is the Hôtel du Fleuve.

== History ==
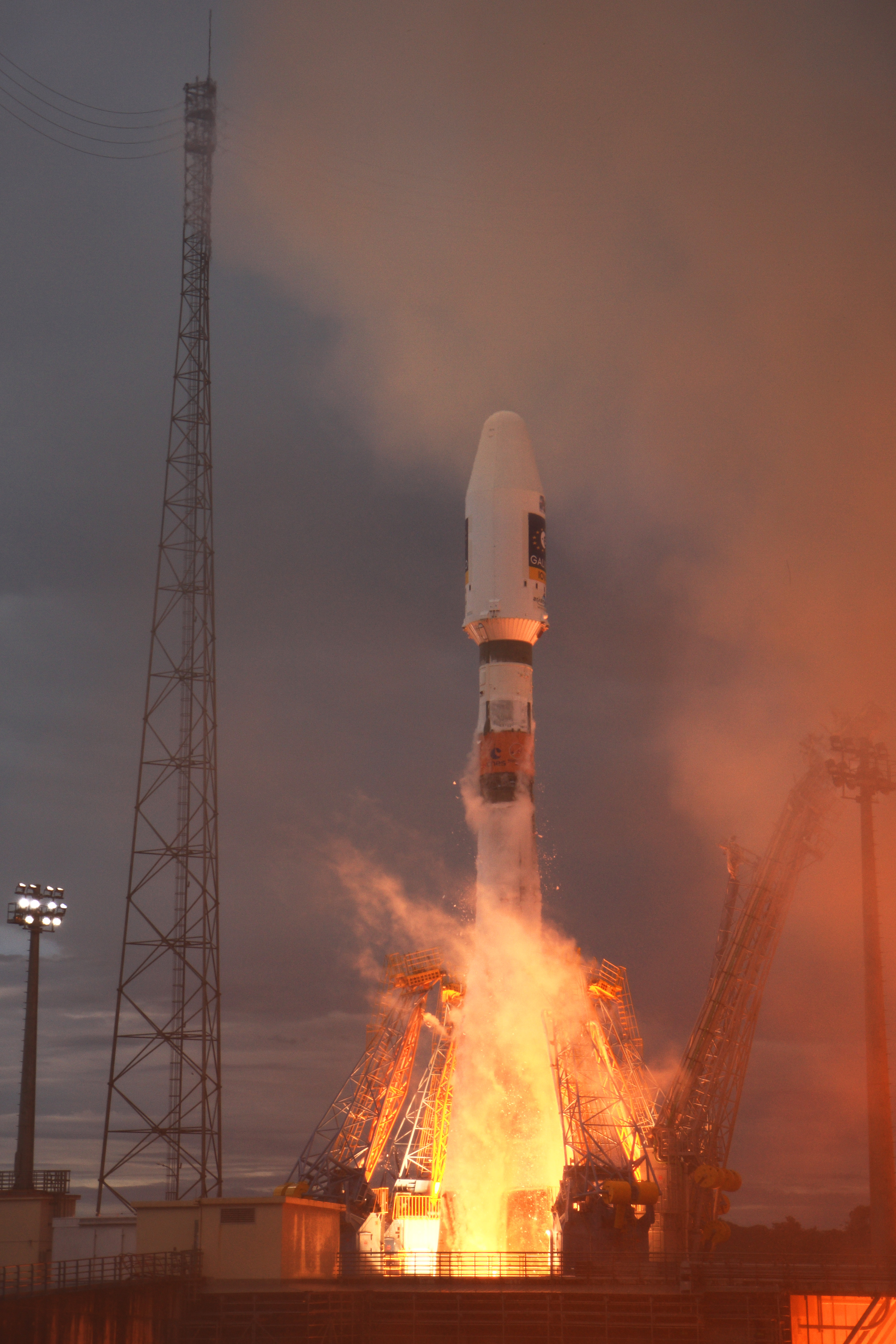
Galileo launch (2011)

The first colonists arrived in the area in 1624, however the town of Sinnamary was officially established in 1664. Sinnamary was taken twice by the Dutch, and once by the British, until in 1763, it was awarded to France by the Treaty of Paris. In 1764, about 40 families of Acadians, still living in exile after the Grand Dérangement nine years earlier, settled in Sinnamary. In 1792 during the French Revolution, the first prison for priests and political enemies opened in Sinnamary which was a precursor of the penal colony of French Guiana. After Napoleon reintroduced slavery in 1802, the town started to grow, and the discovery of gold caused a second boom.

The Guianan Soyuz launch site is situated within the territory of the Sinnamary commune. Colloquially the site and/or project are thus sometimes called "Soyuz at Sinnamary". However, because most other facilities of the Centre Spatial Guyanais are in the neighbouring and more populous Kourou commune, and because the entire CSG itself is thus often called the Kourou space centre, the Guianan Soyuz site/project is also occasionally called "Soyuz at Kourou", even though this is technically incorrect.

== Sports ==
The town is home to US Sinnamary who play at the Stade Omnisports which has a capacity of 2,500 people.

== Geography ==
=== Climate ===
Sinnamary has a tropical monsoon climate (Köppen climate classification Am). The average annual temperature in Sinnamary is 26.9 °C (80.4 °F). The average annual rainfall is 3,020.0 mm (118.90 in) with May as the wettest month. The temperatures are highest on average in October, at around 27.6 °C (81.7 °F), and lowest in January, at around 26.3 °C (79.3 °F). The highest temperature ever recorded in Sinnamary was 35.7 °C (96.3 °F) on 6 November 2008; the coldest temperature ever recorded was 18.7 °C (65.7 °F) on 17 March 2003.

Climate data for Sinnamary (1991–2020 averages, extremes 1980−2013)
Month	Jan	Feb	Mar	Apr	May	Jun	Jul	Aug	Sep	Oct	Nov	Dec	Year
Record high °C (°F)	33.2 (91.8)	33.0 (91.4)	33.2 (91.8)	33.8 (92.8)	33.5 (92.3)	33.4 (92.1)	34.0 (93.2)	34.8 (94.6)	35.5 (95.9)	35.6 (96.1)	35.7 (96.3)	34.5 (94.1)	35.7 (96.3)
Mean daily maximum °C (°F)	29.7 (85.5)	29.7 (85.5)	30.1 (86.2)	30.3 (86.5)	30.3 (86.5)	30.7 (87.3)	31.5 (88.7)	32.1 (89.8)	32.9 (91.2)	33.1 (91.6)	32.3 (90.1)	30.7 (87.3)	31.1 (88.0)
Daily mean °C (°F)	26.3 (79.3)	26.4 (79.5)	26.7 (80.1)	26.9 (80.4)	26.9 (80.4)	26.8 (80.2)	26.9 (80.4)	27.2 (81.0)	27.5 (81.5)	27.6 (81.7)	27.3 (81.1)	26.8 (80.2)	26.9 (80.4)
Mean daily minimum °C (°F)	23.0 (73.4)	23.1 (73.6)	23.2 (73.8)	23.5 (74.3)	23.4 (74.1)	22.8 (73.0)	22.3 (72.1)	22.3 (72.1)	22.1 (71.8)	22.1 (71.8)	22.4 (72.3)	22.8 (73.0)	22.8 (73.0)
Record low °C (°F)	18.8 (65.8)	19.0 (66.2)	18.7 (65.7)	20.0 (68.0)	19.8 (67.6)	19.7 (67.5)	20.0 (68.0)	19.4 (66.9)	19.5 (67.1)	19.8 (67.6)	19.2 (66.6)	19.6 (67.3)	18.7 (65.7)
Average precipitation mm (inches)	327.3 (12.89)	274.4 (10.80)	254.7 (10.03)	424.4 (16.71)	508.4 (20.02)	410.5 (16.16)	192.3 (7.57)	99.6 (3.92)	44.3 (1.74)	51.7 (2.04)	124.4 (4.90)	308.0 (12.13)	3,020 (118.90)
Average precipitation days (≥ 1.0 mm)	20.9	18.6	18.8	21.5	25.7	24.9	18.7	10.4	4.8	6.8	12.5	21.6	205.2
Source: Météo-France

=== Transport ===
Sinnamary can be reached by the National Route 1 between Saint-Laurent-du-Maroni and Cayenne.

Sinnamary is served by the Sinnamary Airport.

== Nature ==
Crique et Pripri Yiyi is a 284 square kilometres (110 sq mi) protected area and wetland located in the commune.

== Population ==
Historical population
Year	Pop.	±% p.a.
1967	1,913	—
1974	2,055	+1.03%
1982	1,991	−0.39%
1990	3,431	+7.04%
1999	2,783	−2.30%
2007	3,110	+1.40%
2012	3,088	−0.14%
2017	2,919	−1.12%
2023	2,756	−0.95%
Source: INSEE

== Notable people ==
- Jean-Victor Castor (1962), politician
- Jean-Claude Darcheville (1975), football player
- Marvin Torvic (1988), football player

== See also ==
- Communes of French Guiana
- Guiana Space Center
- Malmanoury, former village expropriated for the Guiana Space Center
- Petit-Saut Dam, gravity dam on the Sinnamary River
