= Arrondissement of Saint-Georges =

Saint-Georges
- Arrondissement
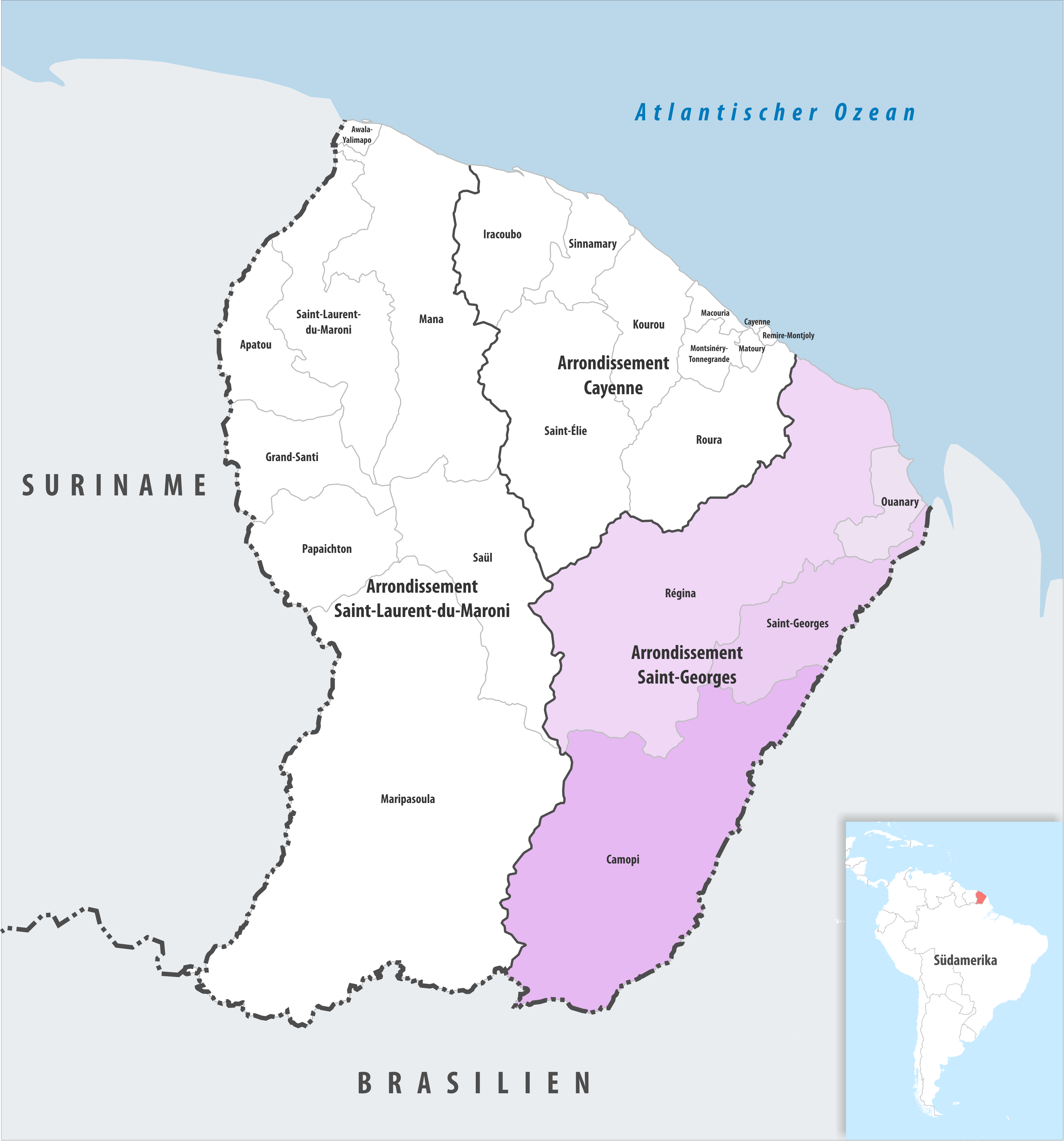
- Location within French Guiana
- Coordinates: 3°40′N 52°30′W
- Country: France
- Overseas region and department: French Guiana{{{region}}}
- No. of communes: {{{nbcomm}}}
- Area: 25,560 km^{2} (9,870 sq mi)
- Population (2023): 8,912
  - Density: 0.3487/km^{2} (0.9031/sq mi)
- INSEE code: 9733

The arrondissement of Saint-Georges is an arrondissement of France located in the French Guiana department and region. Created in October 2022 from part of the arrondissement of Cayenne, the arrondissement spans 25,560 square kilometers and contains four communes. As of the 2023 official estimate, it had a population of 8,912, representing 3% of French Guiana's total population, despite its area representing almost a third of French Guiana. The arrondissement was tasked with fostering local economic development and enhancing cooperation with Brazil, specifically targeting illegal gold mining and trafficking.

== Composition ==
The communes of the arrondissement of Saint-Georges, and their INSEE codes, are:

1. Camopi (97356)
2. Ouanary (97314)
3. Régina (97301)
4. Saint-Georges (97308)

== History ==
The arrondissement of Saint-Georges was created in October 2022 from part of the arrondissement of Cayenne. Its establishment was announced in January 2022 and finalized on 10 October 2022, when the French President announced the opening of six sub-prefectures nationwide, with Saint-Georges being the only entirely new creation. Under the direction of regional Prefect Thierry Queffelec, the administrative setup progressed rapidly, culminating in the official decree signed on 26 October 2022.

Guillaume Brault was appointed as the arrondissement's first sub-prefect on November 25, 2022. The physical sub-prefecture was officially inaugurated by the Minister Delegate for Overseas Territories, Jean-François Carenco, on 11 December 2022 and opened to the public on 2 January 2023. Strategically, the new sub-prefecture was tasked with fostering local economic development and enhancing cross-border cooperation along the 700-kilometer border with Brazil, specifically targeting illegal gold mining and trafficking through joint efforts.

== Demographics ==
According to official estimates, provided by the institut national de la statistique et des études économiques (INSEE), from 2023, the arrondissement of Saint-Georges had a population of 8,912 inhabitants. This represents 3.03% of the total population of French Guiana, which was estimated at 293,996 during the same year. The arrondissement spans a territorial area of 25,560 square kilometers, resulting in a sparse population density of 0.3487 inhabitants per square kilometer. This territory is almost a third (30.6%) of French Guiana's total.

The region has experienced demographic growth since the late 20th century. In 1982, the population of Saint-Georges stood at 2,341, which grew to 2,881 by the 1990 census. This trend accelerated into the turn of the century, with the population rising to 4,042 at the 1999 census, followed by estimates of 5,985 in 2007 and 6,900 in 2015. Between 2015 and 2023, the population expanded further to its present total, reflecting an annual population growth rate of 3.25% over that eight-year period.
