= Countess (biscuit) =

Guianan shortbread biscuit

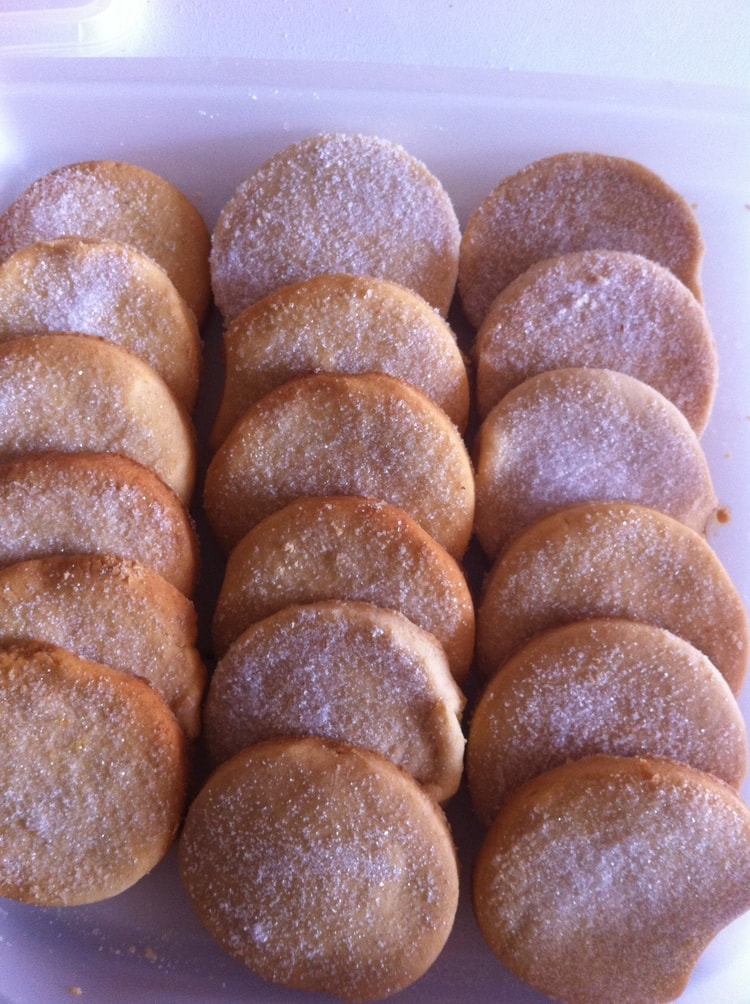
- Countess
- Alternative names: Kontès, comtesse
- Type: Biscuit
- Place of origin: France
- Region or state: French Guiana
- Serving temperature: Cold
- Main ingredients: Flour, Sugar, Sovaco butter

The countess (kontès in Guianan Creole, comtesse in French) is a small shortbread biscuit, somewhat sweet, typical of French Guianan cuisine. It accompanies a dessert such as fruit sorbets or fruit salads and traditionally uses a fruit juice or champagne.

== See also ==
- French Guianan cuisine
- Dizé milé
- Duckanoo
