= Dizé milé =

- Alternative names: Egg of mullet
- Course: Dessert
- Place of origin: France
- Region or state: Guiana
- Created by: Guianan Creole
- Serving temperature: Cold
- Main ingredients: Flour, lard, salt, baking powder, water, sugar, lemon, vanilla, cinnamon, nutmeg

Dizé milé is a beignet stuffed with pastry cream found in French Guianan cuisine. It can be served with a scoop of ice cream or sorbet and champagne.

== See also ==
- Countess (cake)
- Dokonon
