= French Guianan cuisine =

Culinary tradition

French Guianan cuisine or Guianan cuisine is a mixture of Creole, Bushinengue, and indigenous cuisines, supplemented by influences from the cuisines of more recent immigrant groups. Common ingredients include cassava, smoked fish, and smoked chicken. Creole restaurants may be found alongside Chinese restaurants in major cities such as Cayenne, Kourou and Saint-Laurent-du-Maroni.

== Common ingredients ==
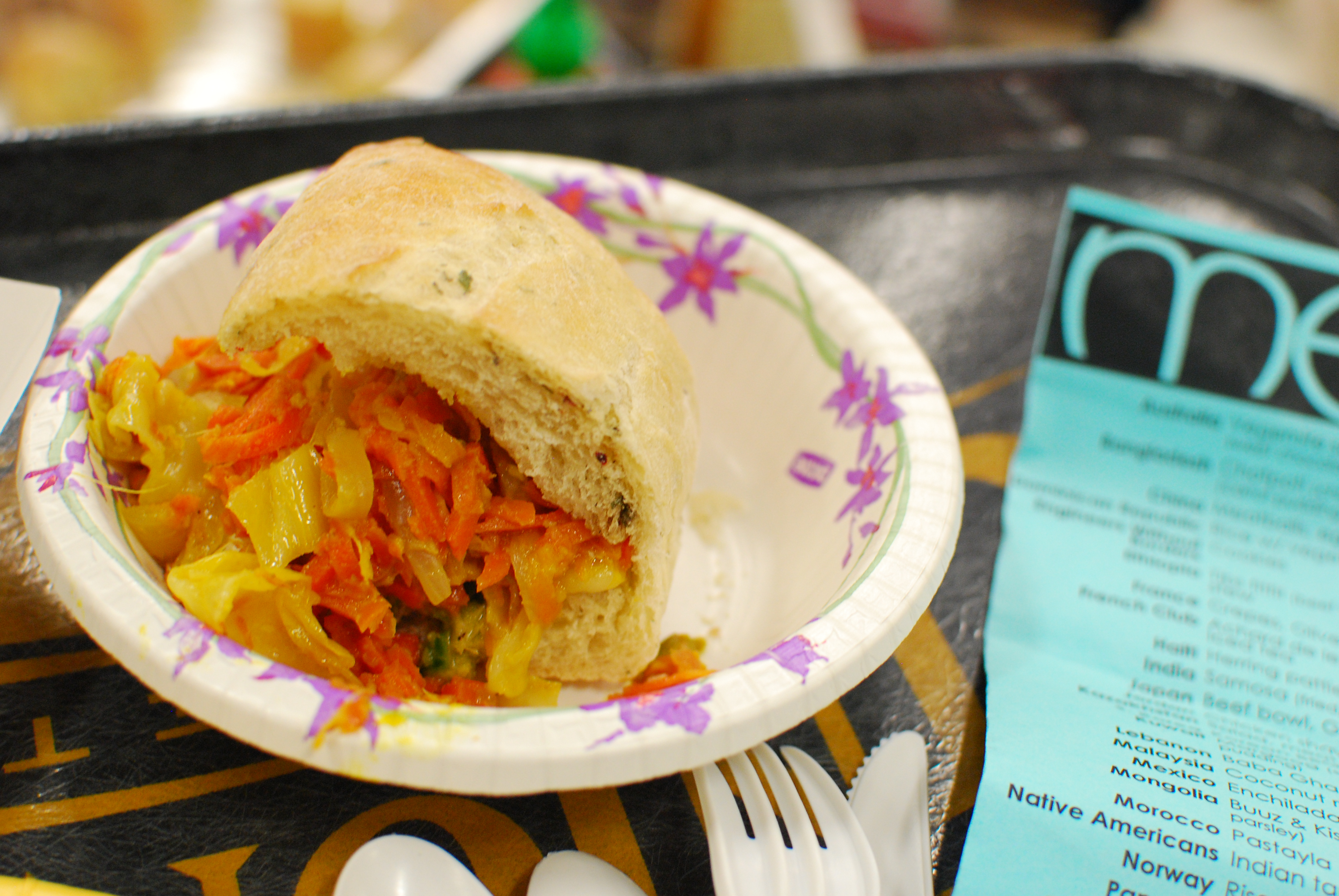
Acar sandwich

=== Spices and condiments ===
- Bélimbi
- Allspice
- Cinnamon
- Clove
- Turmeric
- Ginger
- Kwabio (condiment)
- Cayenne pepper
- Green pepper
- Roucou

=== Vegetables ===
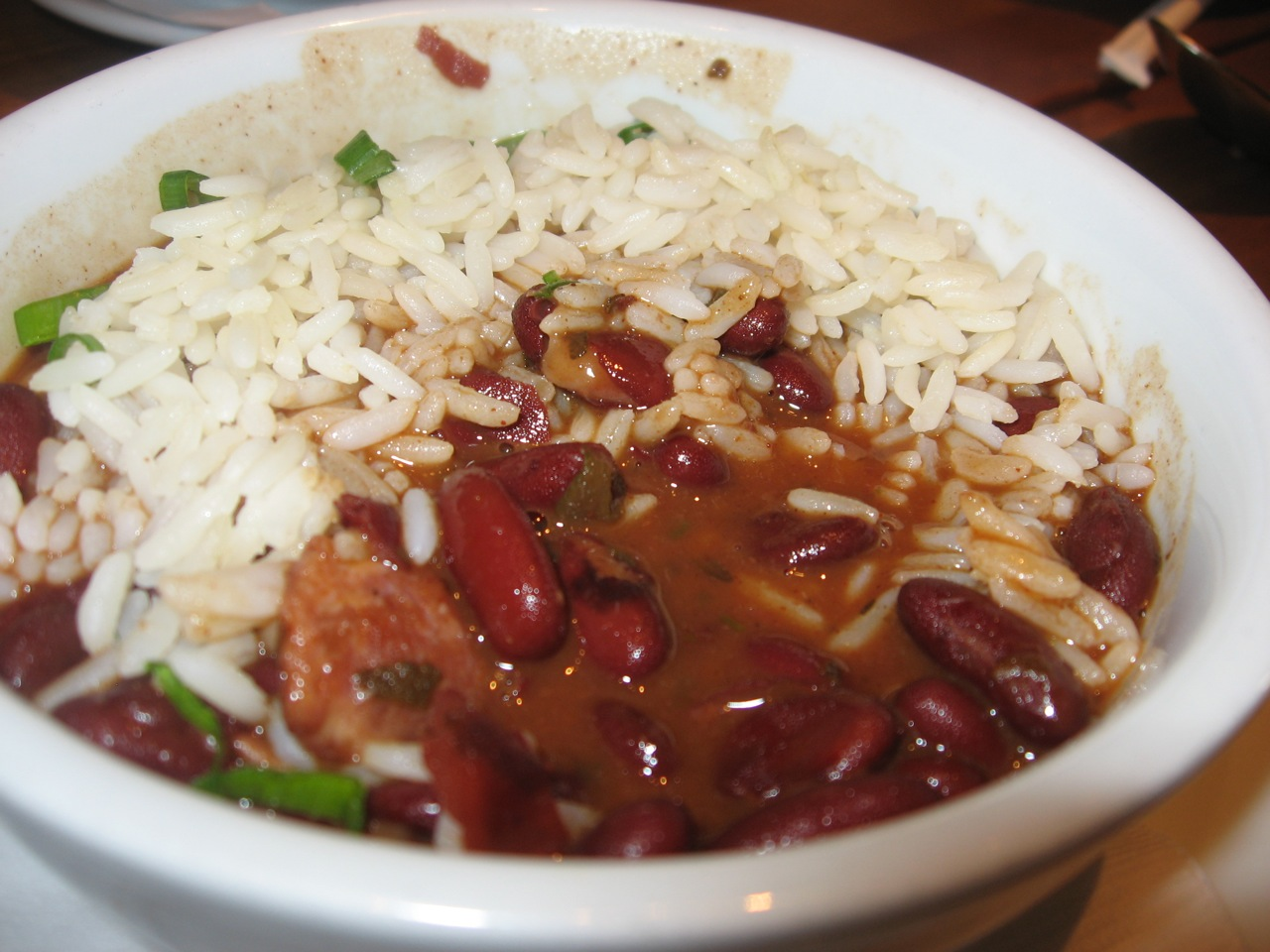
Red beans and rice

- Garlic
- Onion
- Shallots
- Eggplant
- Yellow and green banana (cooking banana)
- Calou (pepper)
- Zucchini
- Chestnut
- Pumpkin
- Cucumber
- Dachine
- Spinach
- Breadfruit
- Yardlong bean
- Red bean
- Yam
- Turnip
- Parépou
- Sorossi
- Pigeon peas
- Pea
- Tayove
- Green bean

=== Common fruits ===
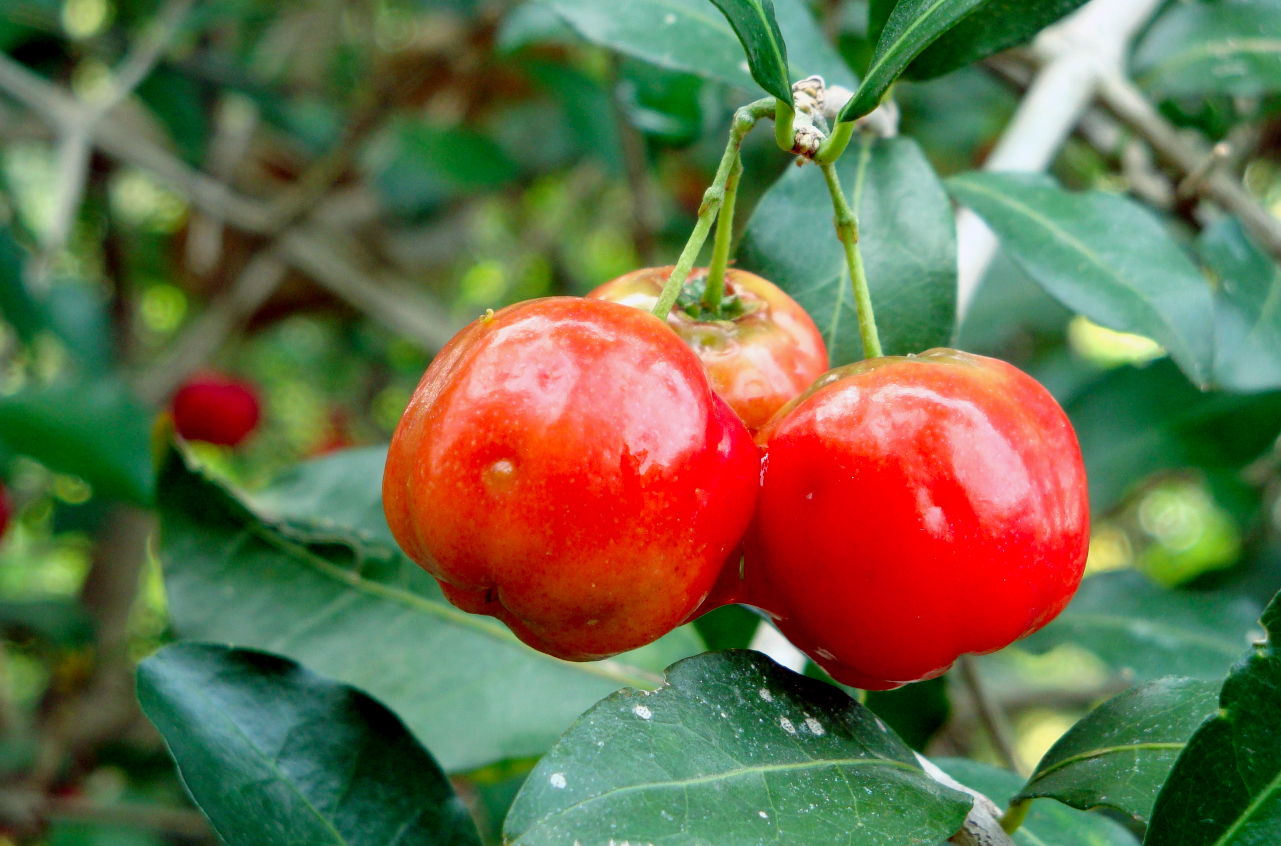
Acerola cherry fruit

- Mammea americana
- Acerola cherry
- Cayenne cherry
- Mango
- Passion fruit
- Orange
- Clementine
- Mandarin
- Chadeck
- Lemon
- Papaya
- Annona squamosa
- Kythira plum
- Rambutan
- Tomato
- Banana

=== Meats ===
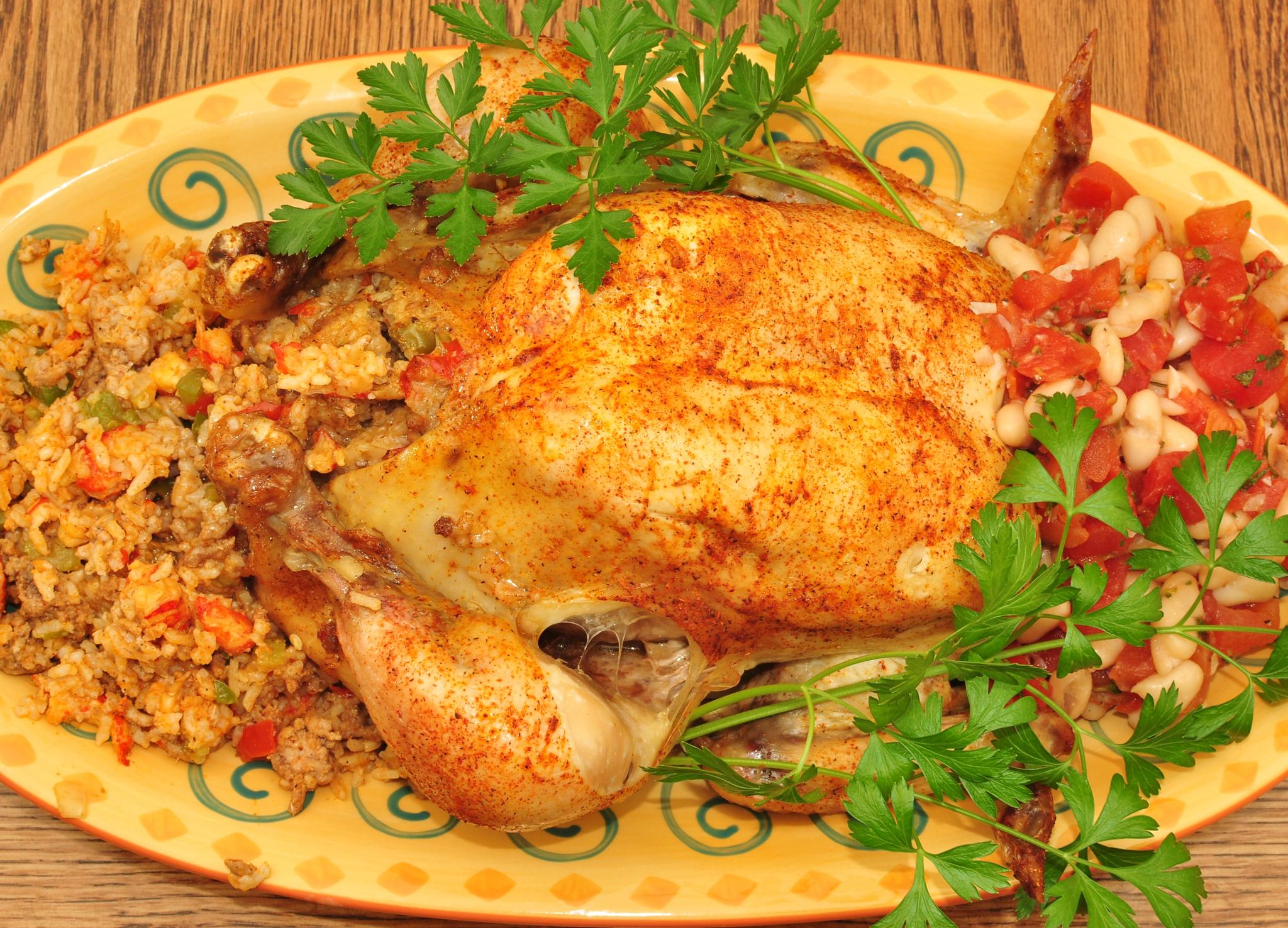
Chicken with creole rice

- Beef
- Chicken
- Duck
- Goose
- Mutton
- Pig
- Turkey
- Veal

=== Game (hunting) ===
- Agami
- Peccary
- Agouti
- Maïpouri
- Hocco
- Iguana
- Cingulata
- Maraï

=== Seafood ===
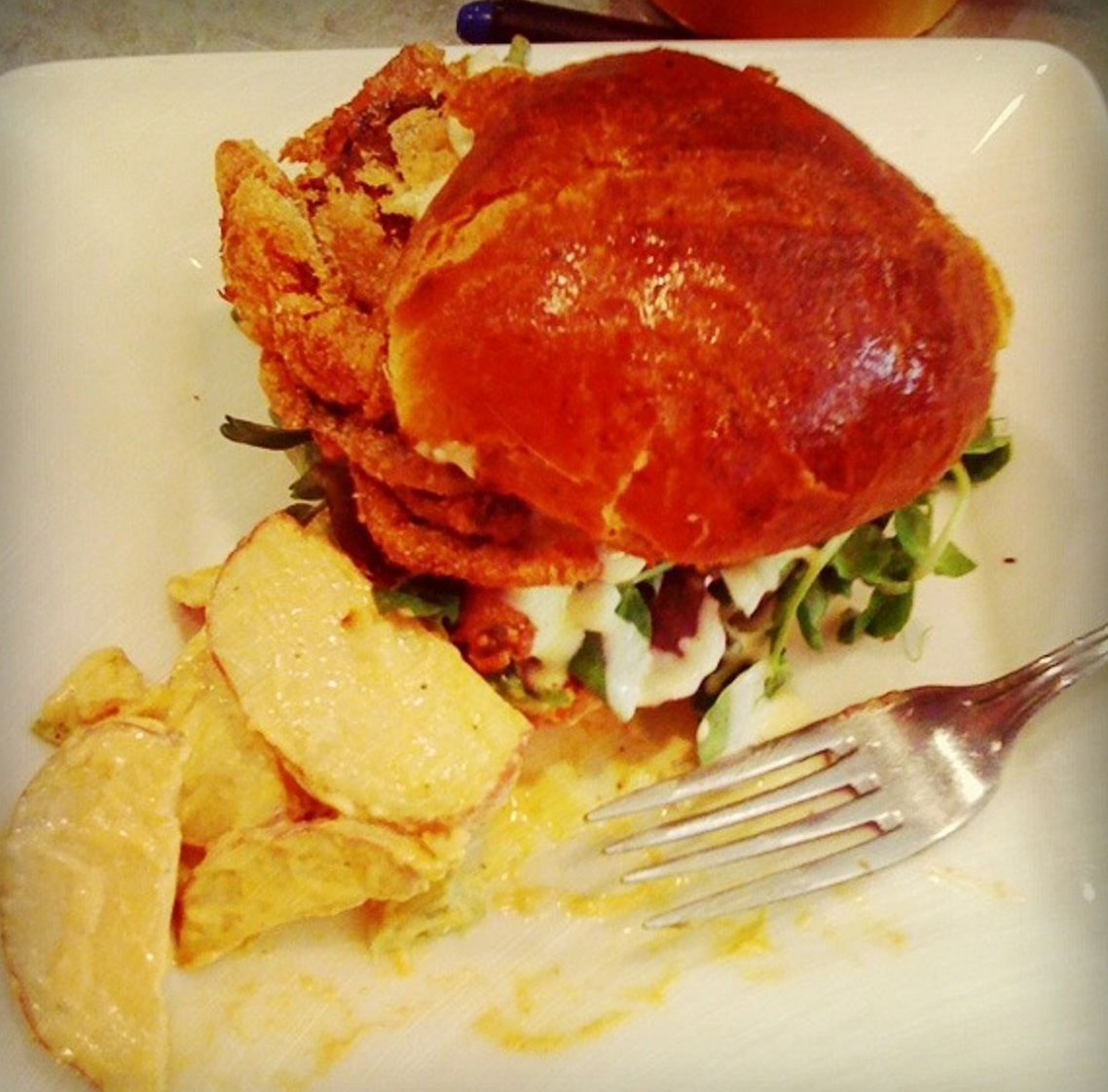
Creole crab

- Sardines
- Tuna
- Machoiran
- Acoupa
- Snapper
- Mangrove crab
- Mangrove oyster
- Shrimp
- Atipas
- Aymara
- Pirai
- Coumarou
- Pacou
- Pacoussine
- Tiger torch
- Snail
- Shark
- Line
- Mule
- toadfish
- Palika
- Croupia
- Ti-Djol
- Mussels
- Patagaï

== Local cuisine ==
Creole cuisine blends flavors of tropical products Amazonian many from the forest as cassava, awara the comou and game. But many dishes have their roots deep in Africa, Asia and Europe. What gives it that spicy and subtle flavor. On the local market, instead of obligatory passage, the Creole merchant advise and make taste their products. This ranges from couac, cassava flour, essential for the realization of fierce lawyer, which draws all its power from the cayenne pepper. The cassava, long reserved for the poor, becoming a sought-after commodity, it is used in the stuffed restaurants in the Kalawanng or sweetened either with coconut jam, or with grated coconut or guava paste. As for Kontès, which consume a starter or an aperitif, they accompany the famous Ti' Punch.

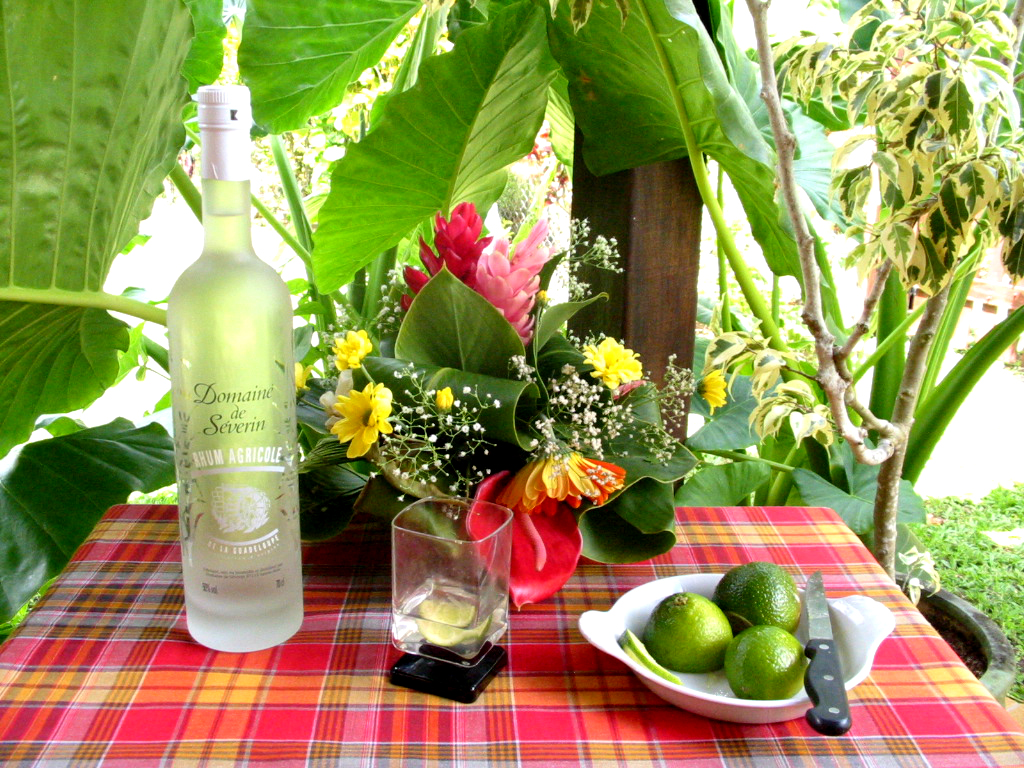
A ti-punch

== Drinks ==
- Ti' Punch (little punch)
- Saint-Maurice Rum
- Roselle syrup of Roselle (plant)
- Planter
- punch various (coconut punch, comou punch, maracudja punch...)
- Comou or Açaí juice

== Starters ==
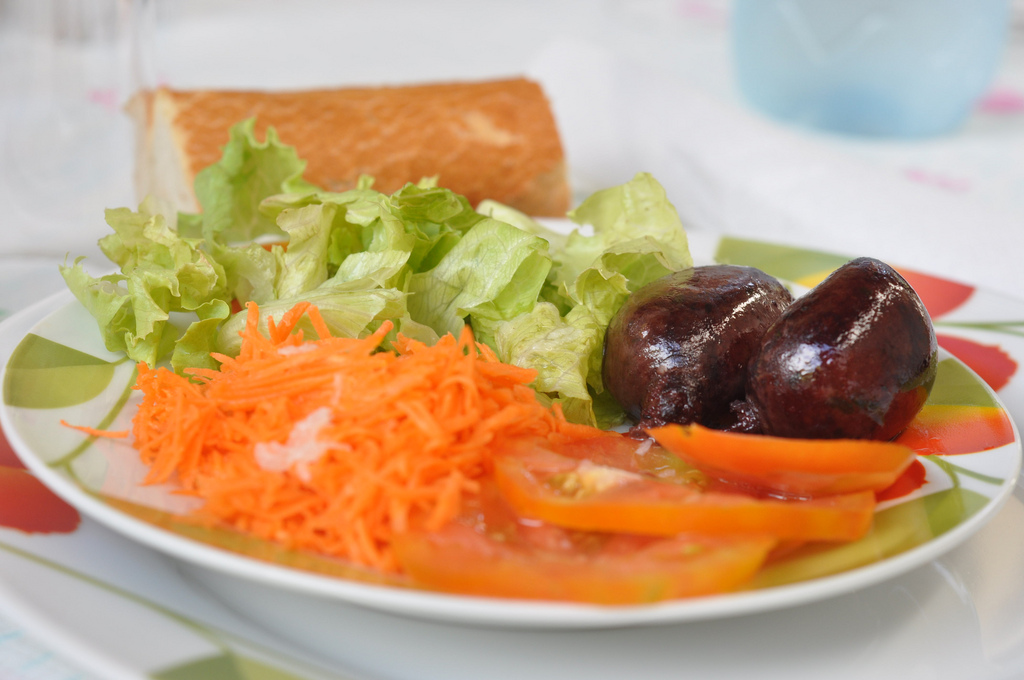
Creole pudding served with salad

- Creole pudding
- Shrimp marinade
- Cod fritters
- Stuffed crab
- Soup z'habitant(s) (popular Creole soup, as "z'habitants" means country folk throughout the French Caribbean area)
- Mangrove oysters (from Montsinéry)

== Dishes (food) ==
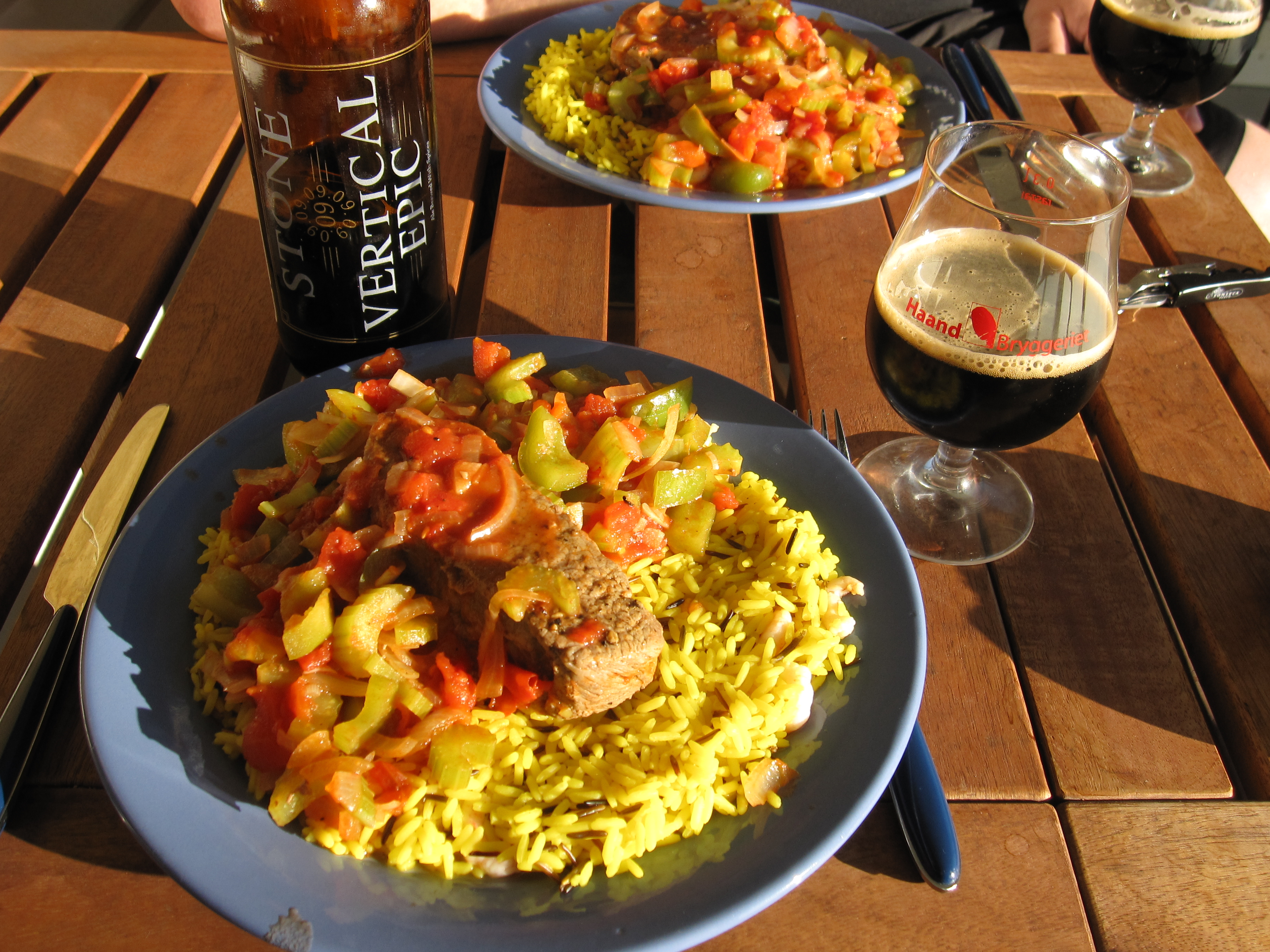
Beef fricassee with creole rice

- Fish or chicken blaff
- Awara broth
- Calou (smoked meat and/or shrimp and pig tails with spinach)
- Kalawang (green mango salad)
- Guianan colombo (stew of meat and vegetables with curry: potato, green bean, etc.)
- Pig, chicken, beef, or iguana fricassee
- Giraumonade (mashed pumpkin)
- Pawpaw, cucumber, dasheen, or couac gratin
- Pig-tails and beans ("haricot rouj ké la tcho cochon" in creole)
- Pimentade (fish in tomato sauce)
- Fish sauce maracudja
- Yam puree
- Couac salad
- Creole steak
- Smoked fish, chicken, pork ribs
- Lentils with pig-tails ("lanty ké la tcho cochon" in creole)
Smoked dishes

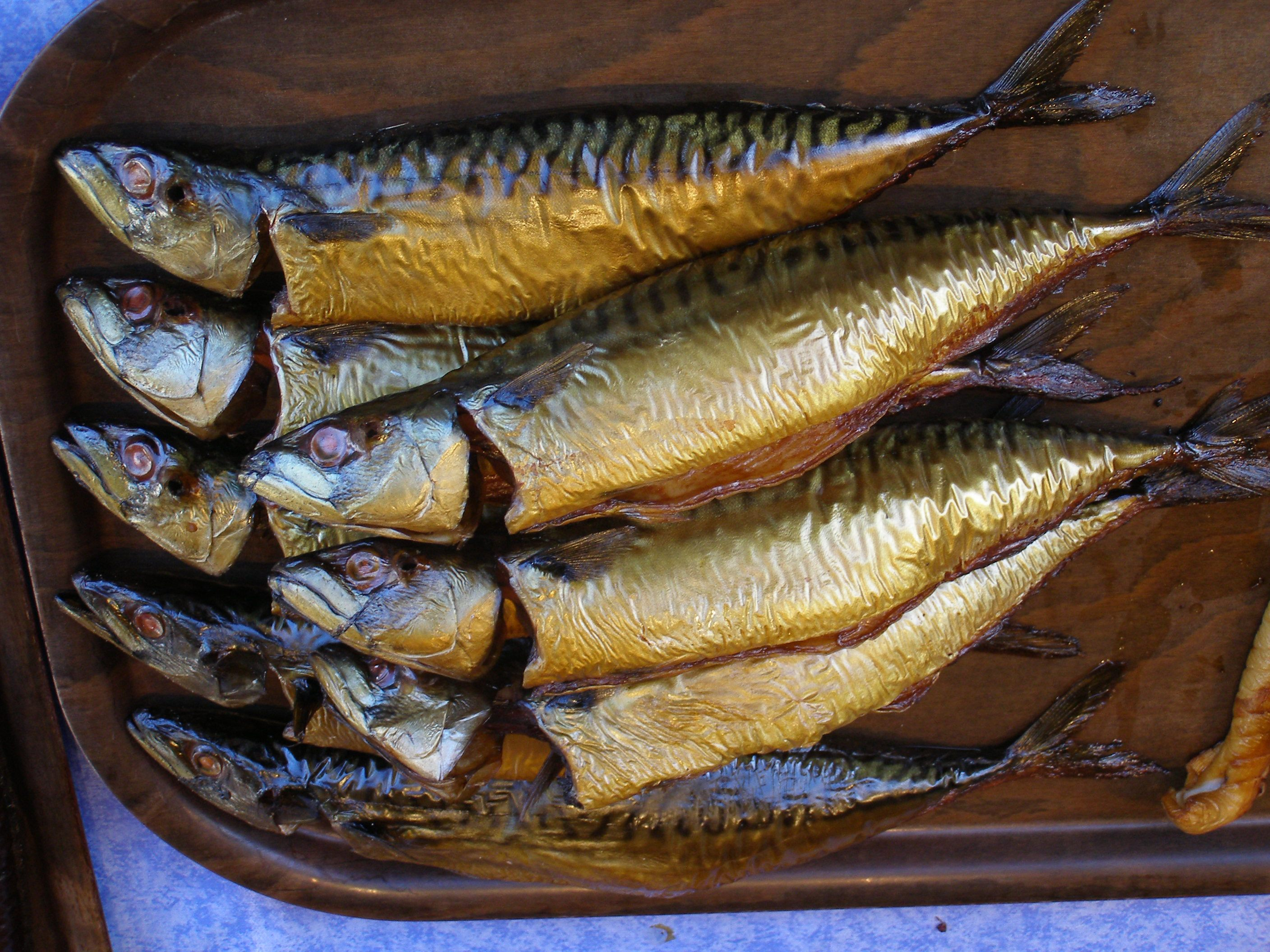
Smoked fish

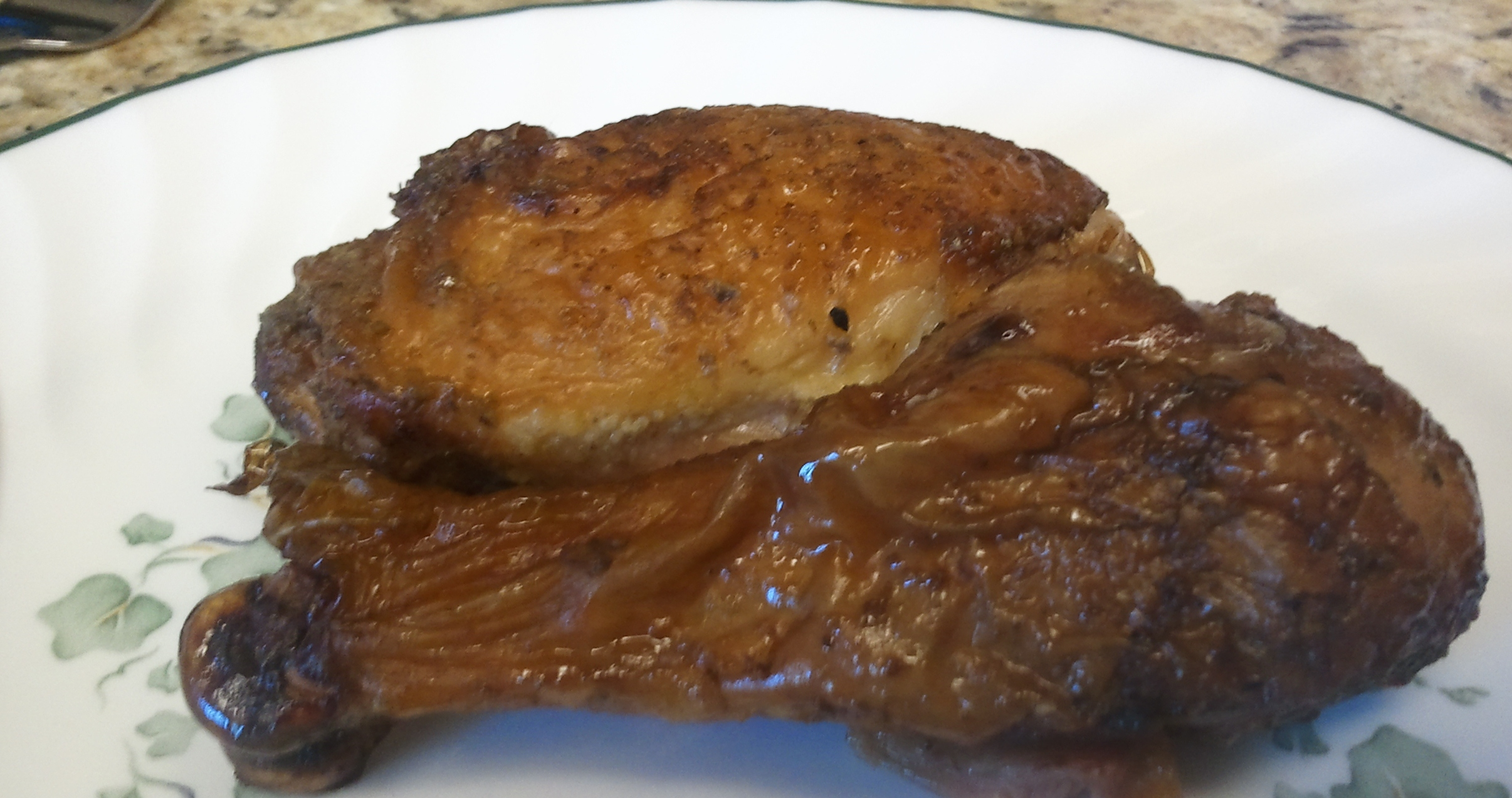
Smoked chicken

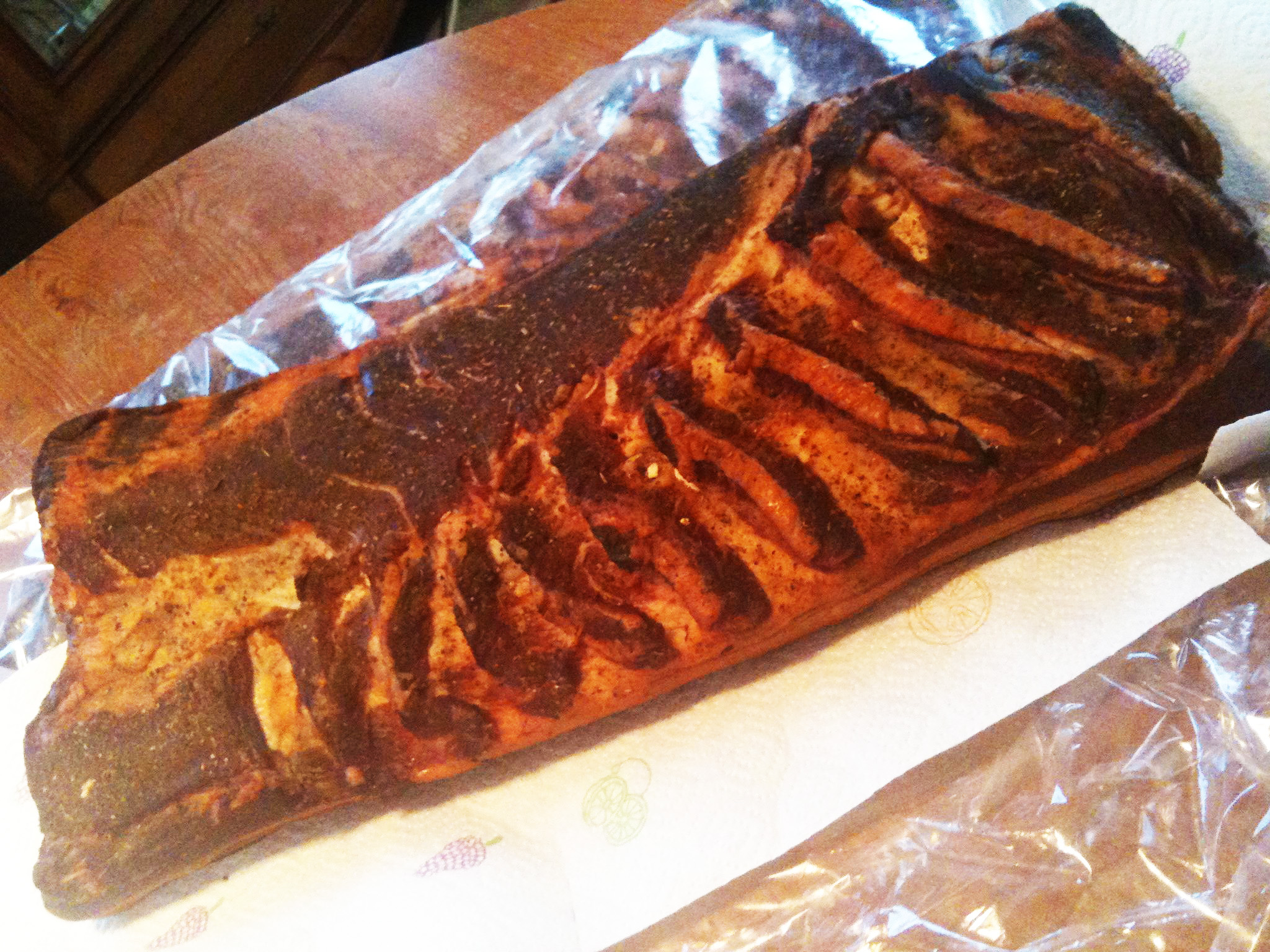
Smoked pork ribs

Ertyuiop

== Desserts, sweets, pastries ==
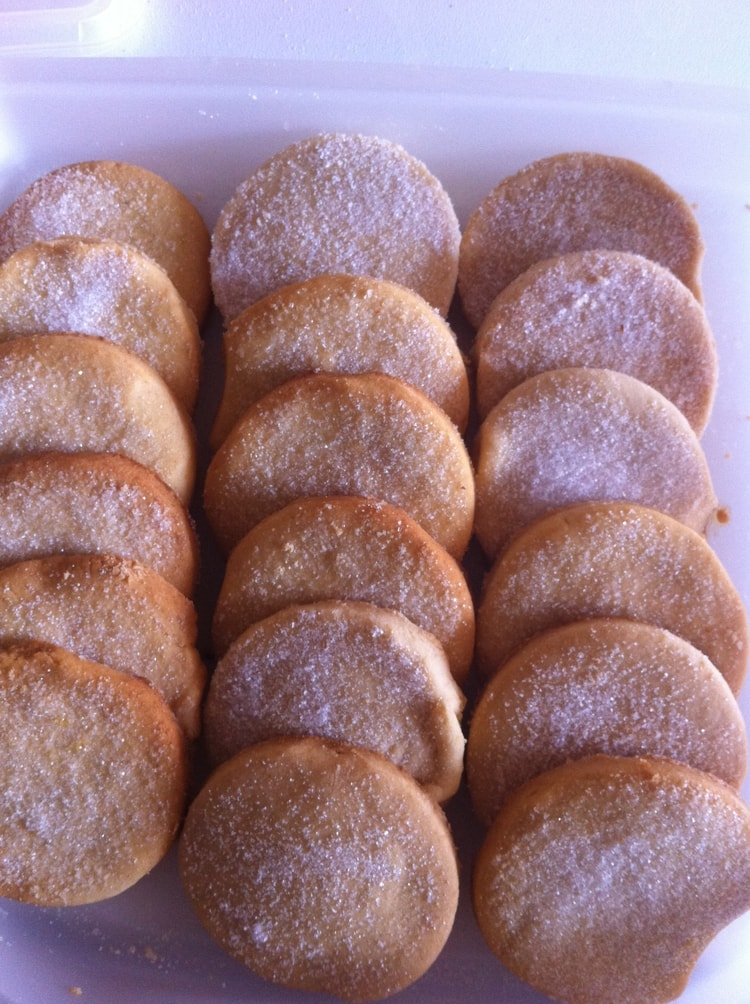
Countess (cake)

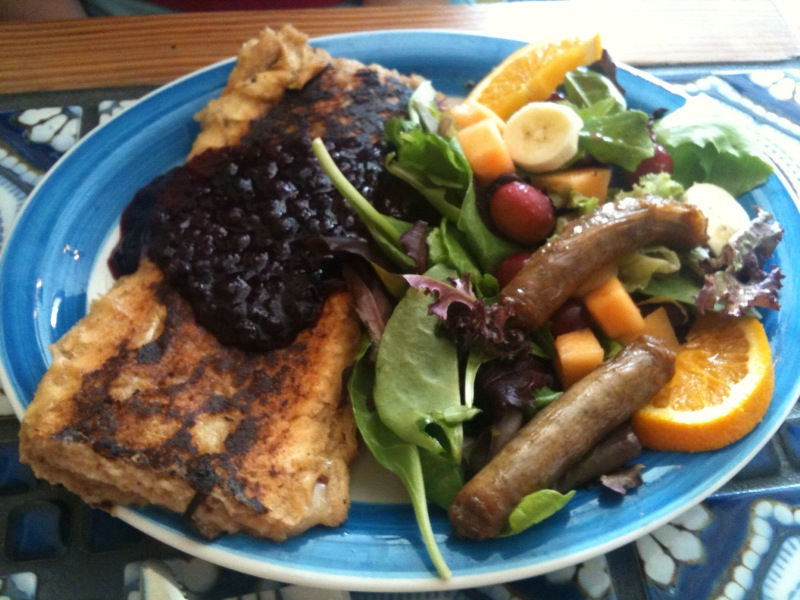
French toast

- Angou (desserts)
- Coconut jam
- Sweet potato jam
- Conserve (coconut tablet)
- Couac coconut (sweetened semolina)
- Creticus (candied coconut)
- Frozen sorrel
- Lotcho (sweet pulp coconut)
- Pistachio nougat (black nougat)
- Ramiquin (pulled candy sugar)
- Barley sugar
- Wang (sweet or savory powder)
- Zoa (semolina sugary cereal)
- Zorey Milat (fruit in syrup jam)
- Coconut sorbet
- French toast
- Sispa
- Banana salad
- Eggs with milk
- Lanmou chinwa (cake)
- American (cake)
- Bindingwel
- Countess
- Dizé milé (donut)
- Dokonon (poached cake in foil)
- Cramanioc cake (pudding)
- Marzipan
- Banana pulp (slipper)
