= Couac =

Flour made from cassava root

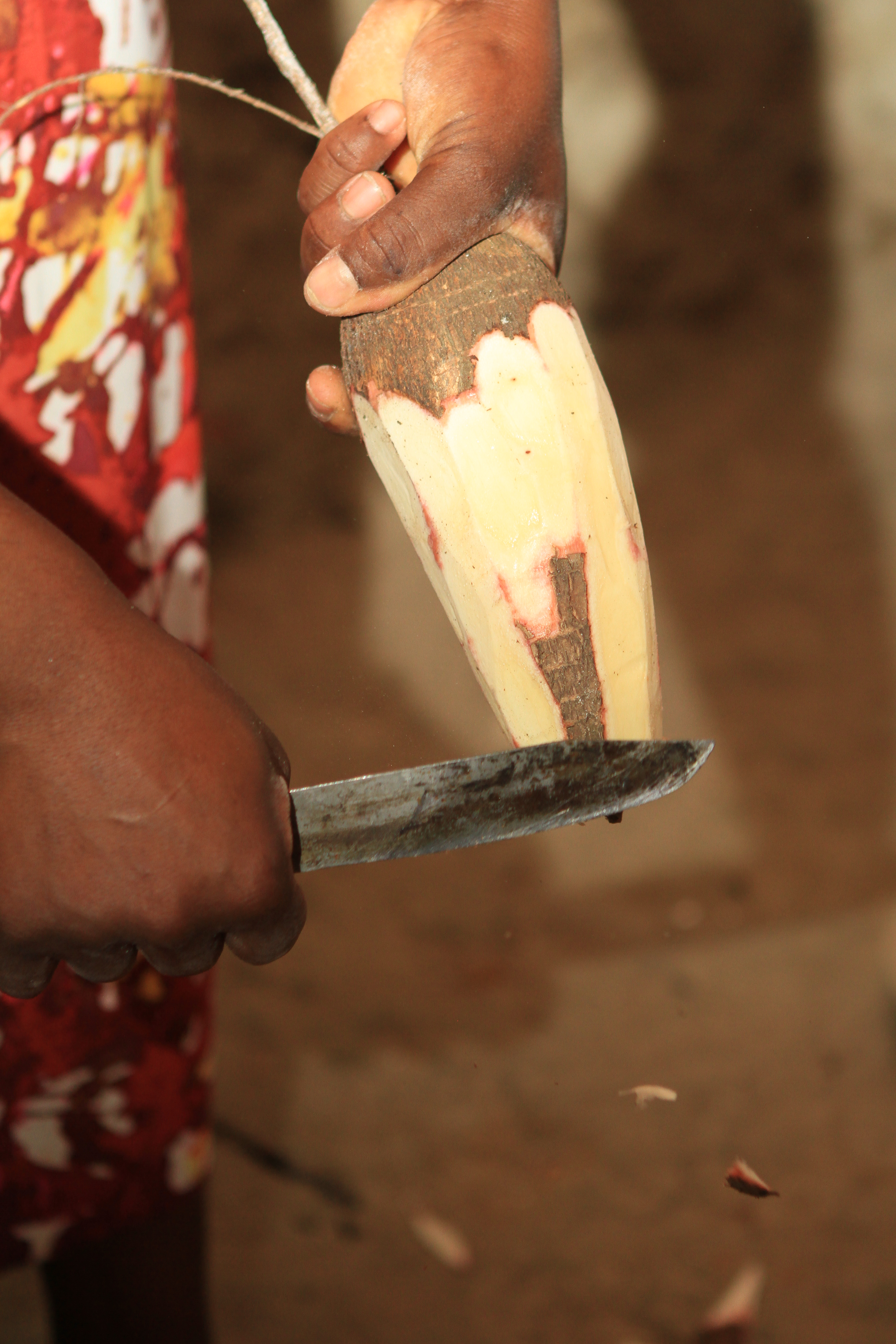
Instrument

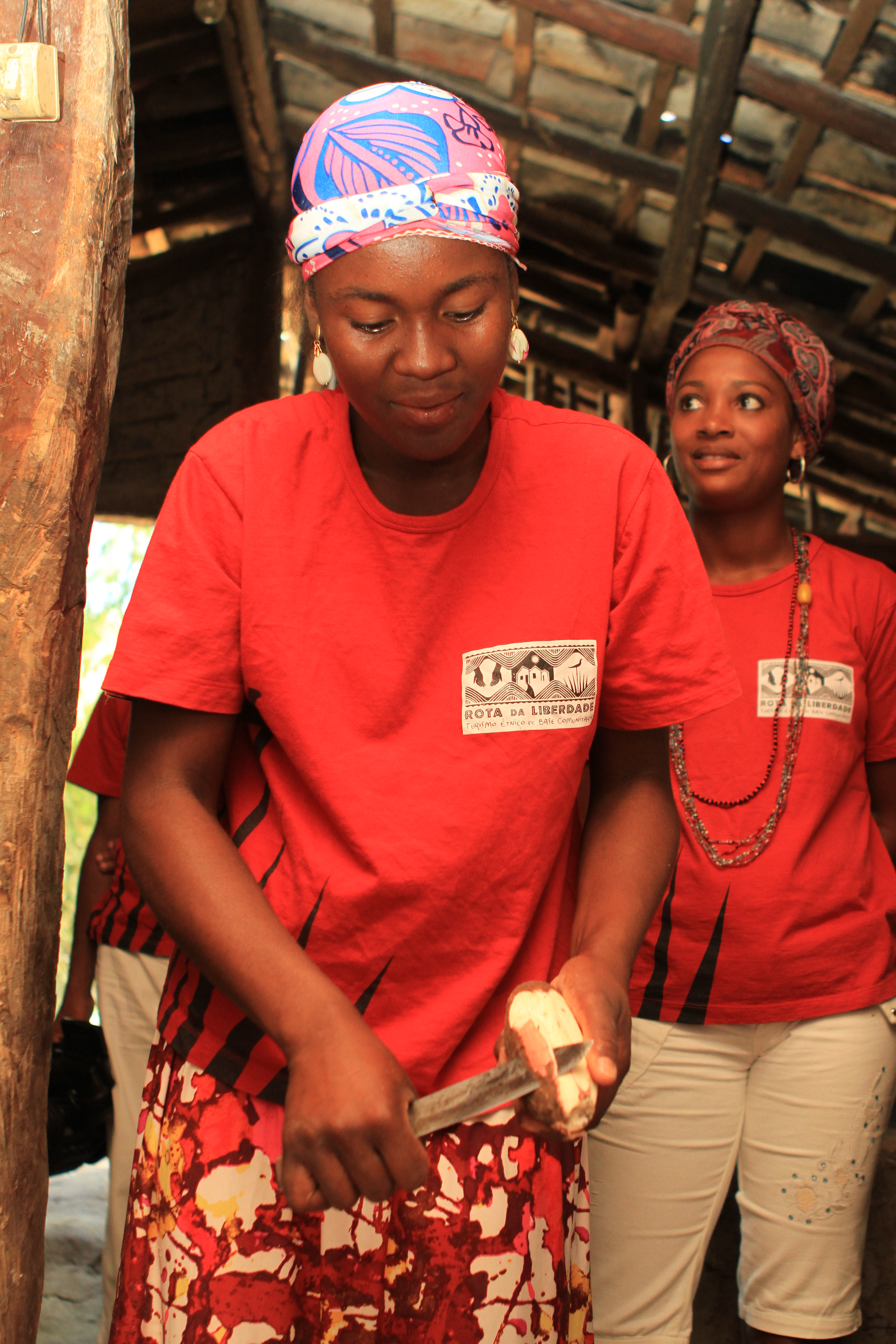
To grager

Couac, also called kwak in Guianese Creole and farinha de mandioca in Portuguese, is flour made from cassava root, peeled, soaked in water, grated and drained to remove the poisonous cyanide it contains. Cassava roots are sold in markets as the kramangnok (cramanioc) for sweet varieties, and processed under the kwak names; kasav, cassava, sispa, tapioca or crabio for bitter varieties. Couac is widely eaten by the inhabitants of Brazil and the Guianas (Suriname, Guyana and French Guiana).

== History ==
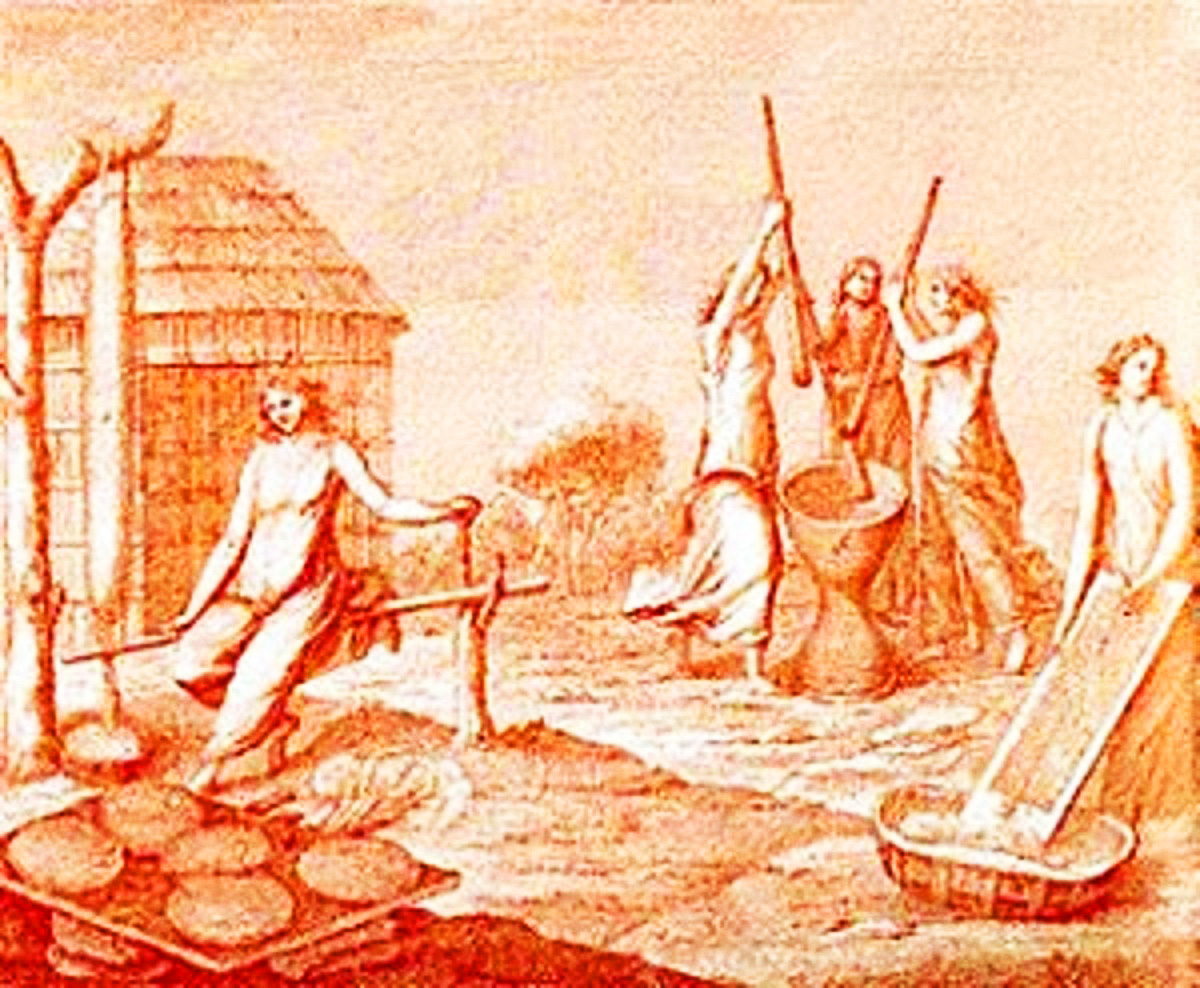
Development of the couac and the cassava in the 18th century

Archaeological research has shown that the cassava (yucca) was originally cultivated 4,000 years ago in the Peru. This culture, specifically the Americas, preceded the maize in many areas. But pre-Columbian food quickly organized around the corn and cassava. Its root was the food of the Indians of the pre-colonial era. The Spaniards despised that foodstuff reserved for the African slaves, who made it their staple food.

Cassava is the staple food in many countries of Latin America. Culture extends north of Argentina until Mexico, via the Caribbean. In French Guiana, archaeological evidence of Native Americans by cassava are observable in the region of Iracoubo in the form of raised fields (earth mounds spaced evenly forming pits on aerial images) in areas currently occupied by savanna or forest. Cassava carries various names: yucca, mandioca, mañoco, tapioca, etc. Its edible part is its roots, but its leaves can also be eaten.

== Description ==
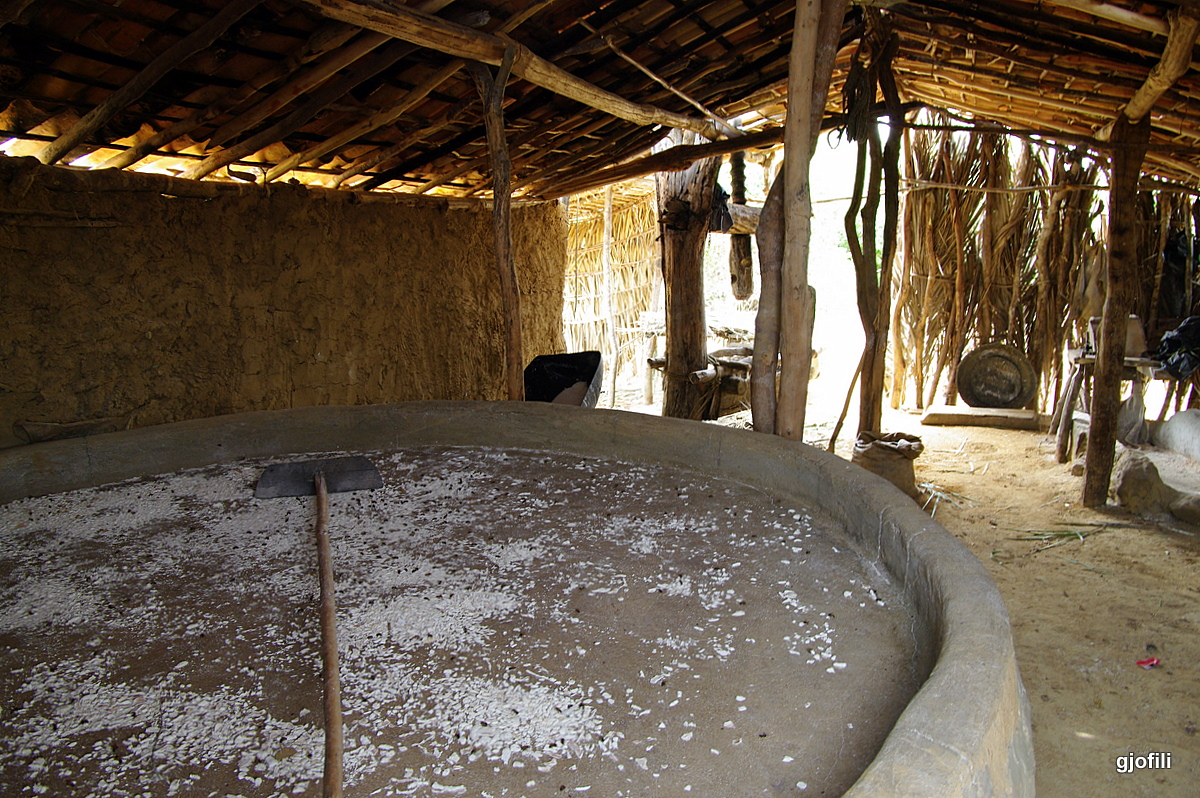
Space reserved for the manufacture of couac

Couac is a more or less dry coarse semolina that ranges in color from bright yellow to gray to white. It is traditionally made from bitter cassava varieties.

The preparation technique has not changed over the centuries. Tubers are first peeled and then pulped using the grating board: a wooden plank with embedded small quartz crystals or a sheet of metal with sharp dents. (Now, where possible a grinder is used).

The resulting slurry is then put into a snake (couleuvre), an elongated tubular basketry, carved often provided with a loop at each end. The snake is then stretched to press the dough and squeeze the toxic juice (cyanide). The latter is recovered and then detoxified in turn by long cooking, and can be eaten as a soup.

The flour is generally concentrated in the bottom of the snake. Sometimes it is allowed to rest a few days so it ferments and takes on a stronger taste. The pulp is then crumbled and sieved using a braided Manaré to extract wood fibers and chunks. The couac is considered unalterable flour, resistant to insects and moisture.

== Composition ==
Composition of French Guiana couac
Composant	Bright yellow %	Yellow gray %	White %
Humidity	11,30	10,70	9,00
Lipid	0,40	0,25	0,20
Protein	1,84	2,05	1,26
Fiber	1,90	2,60	2,25
Carbohydrate	83,46	83,10	85,99
Ash	1,10	1,30	1,30

== Consumption ==
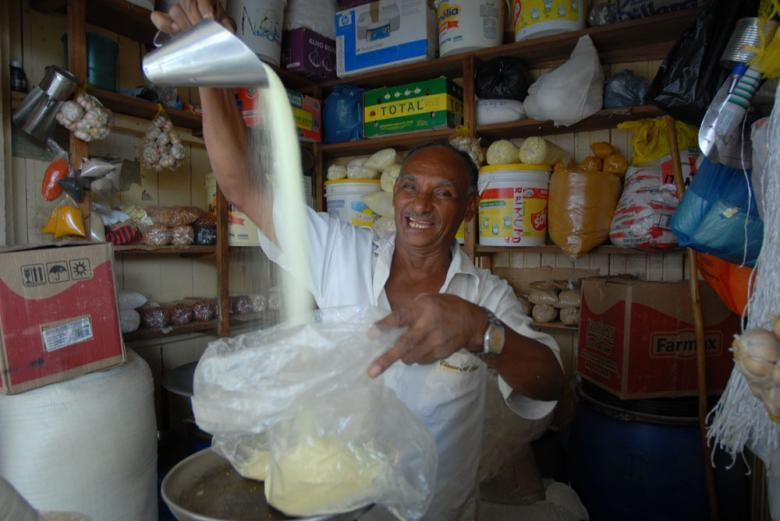
Selling couac or cassava flour

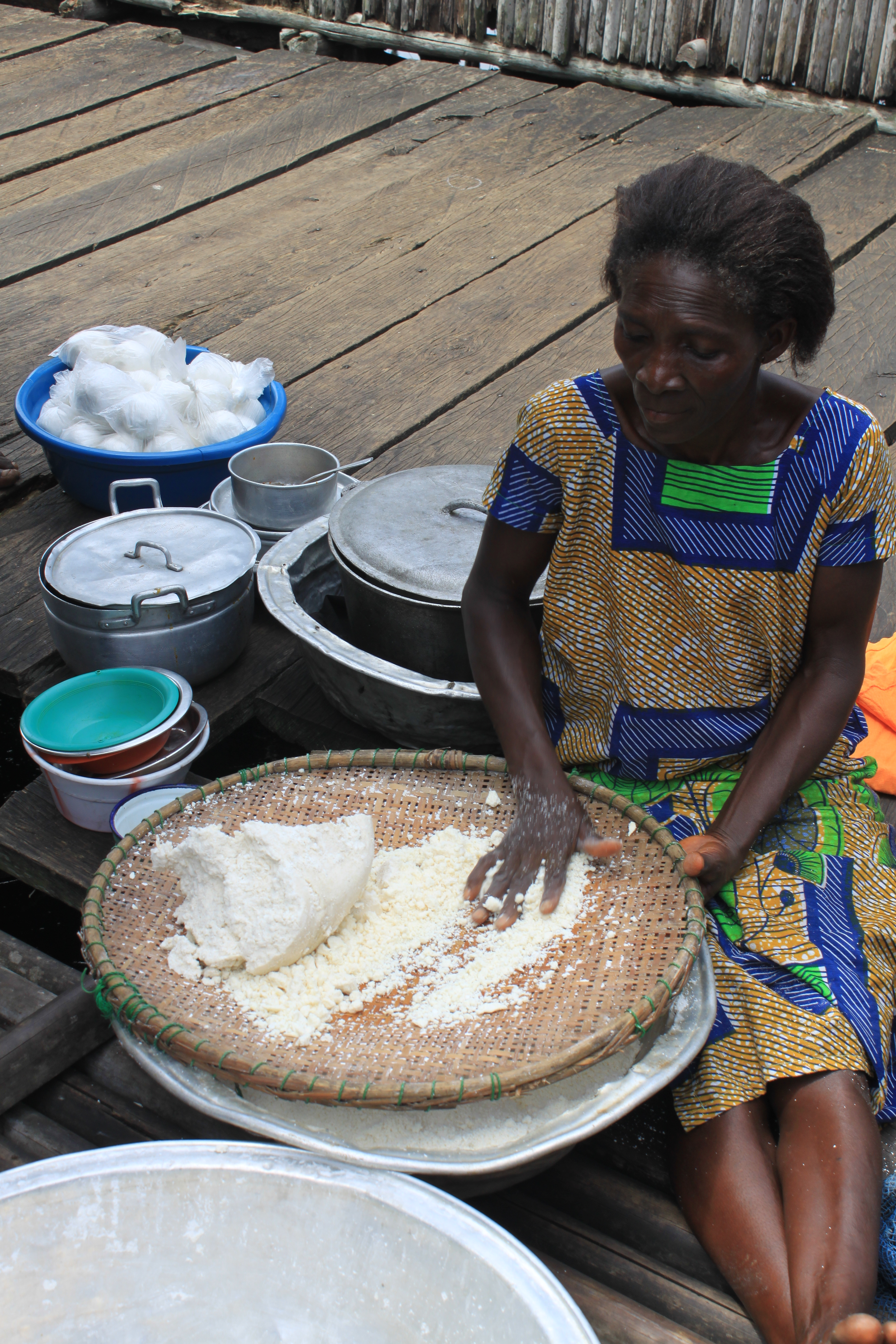
Sieving using a braided manaré

The resulting shredded cassava is pressed to extract the juice that contains toxic cyanide. If allowed to stand some time, it ferments and takes a stronger taste. The dried pulp is then crumbled and sieved in a Manaré braided to extract fibers and pieces. Semolina obtained is roasted on a large steel plate (originally earthenware) over a fire. During the cooking, it is stirred constantly to prevent it agglomerating. This cassava flour (farinha de mandioca in Brazil) now takes the name of quack. It can be eaten alone, in salads, grilled fried or in gratin. Detoxified and compressed pulp is sometimes sold in the markets. There are several colors (from white to yellow) and several sizes.

Being absorbent, the couac is eaten like bread at every meal. Long and easy conservation, nourishing, naturally dehydrated, it ideally between the people staying in the forest menu. In the 18th century, Rozier and Chaptal explained that the browned and smoked couac was the only food of the travelers who boarded the Amazon river. And with a supply of ten pounds a man had enough to live fifteen days.

== See also ==
- Cassava
- Guianan cuisine

== Bibliography ==
- François Rozier et Jean-Antoine Chaptal, Cours complet d'agriculture, théorique, pratique, économique et de médecine rurale et vétérinaire, Volume 6 en ligne
- Alvaro Montaldo, Couac y Casabe in Cultivo de Raices y Tuberculos Tropicales, en ligne
