= Tamalito =

Traditional Mesoamerican dish

The tamalito or "tamalitos" is a common dish prepared by the Maya (Mexico and Belize). The appearance of the "tamalitos" is of the tamales which is wrapped with leaves but without meat.

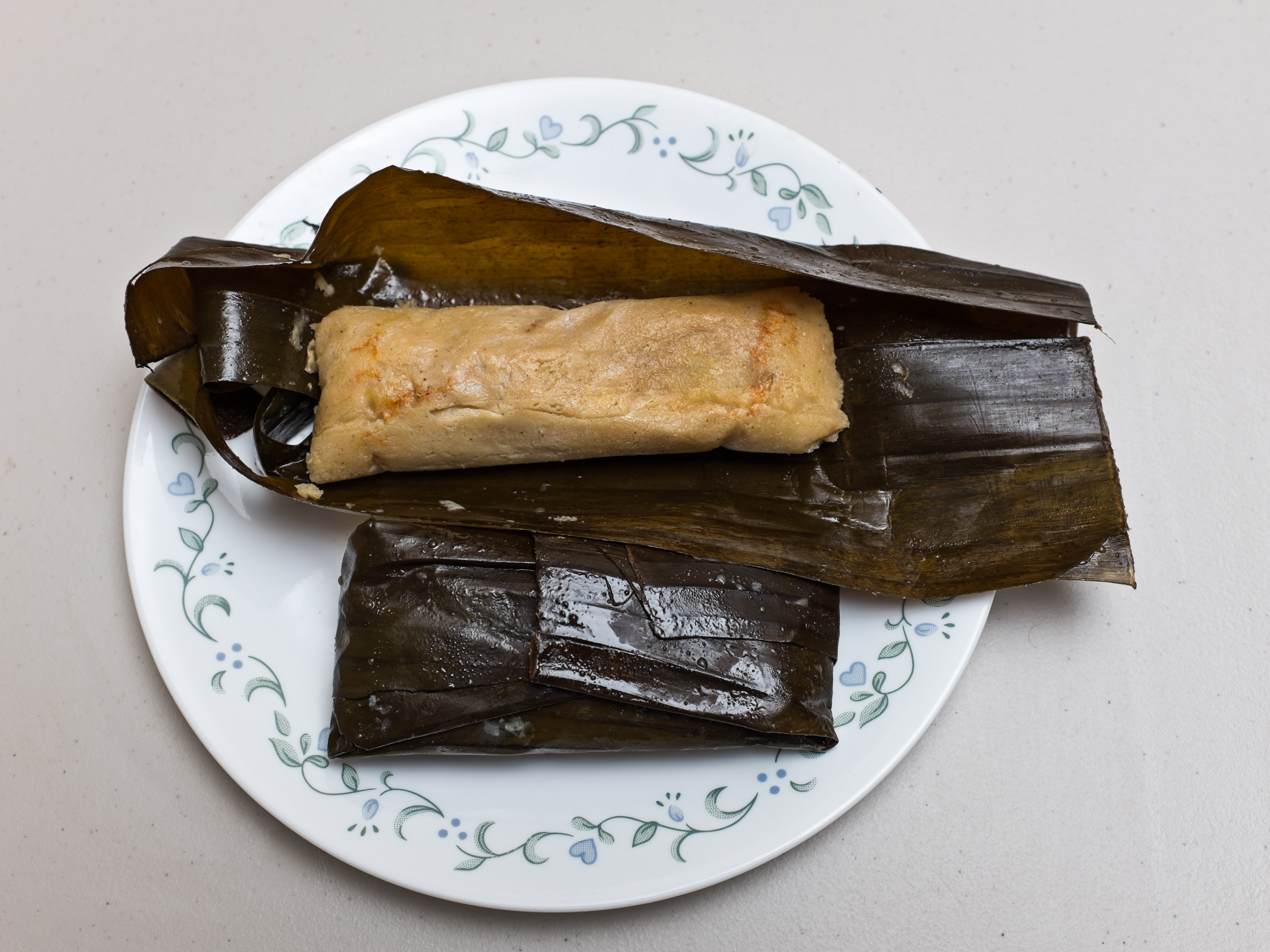
Tamalito in El Salvador

== Preparation ==
Tamalitos is prepared by using fresh corn "maiz", preferably harvested within the last day or two. The fresher the corn, the sweeter and softer the tamalito. Twenty whole ears worth of corn maiz will yield fifteen tamalitos.

== See also ==
- List of dumplings
