= Duckanoo =

Caribbean dessert tamale

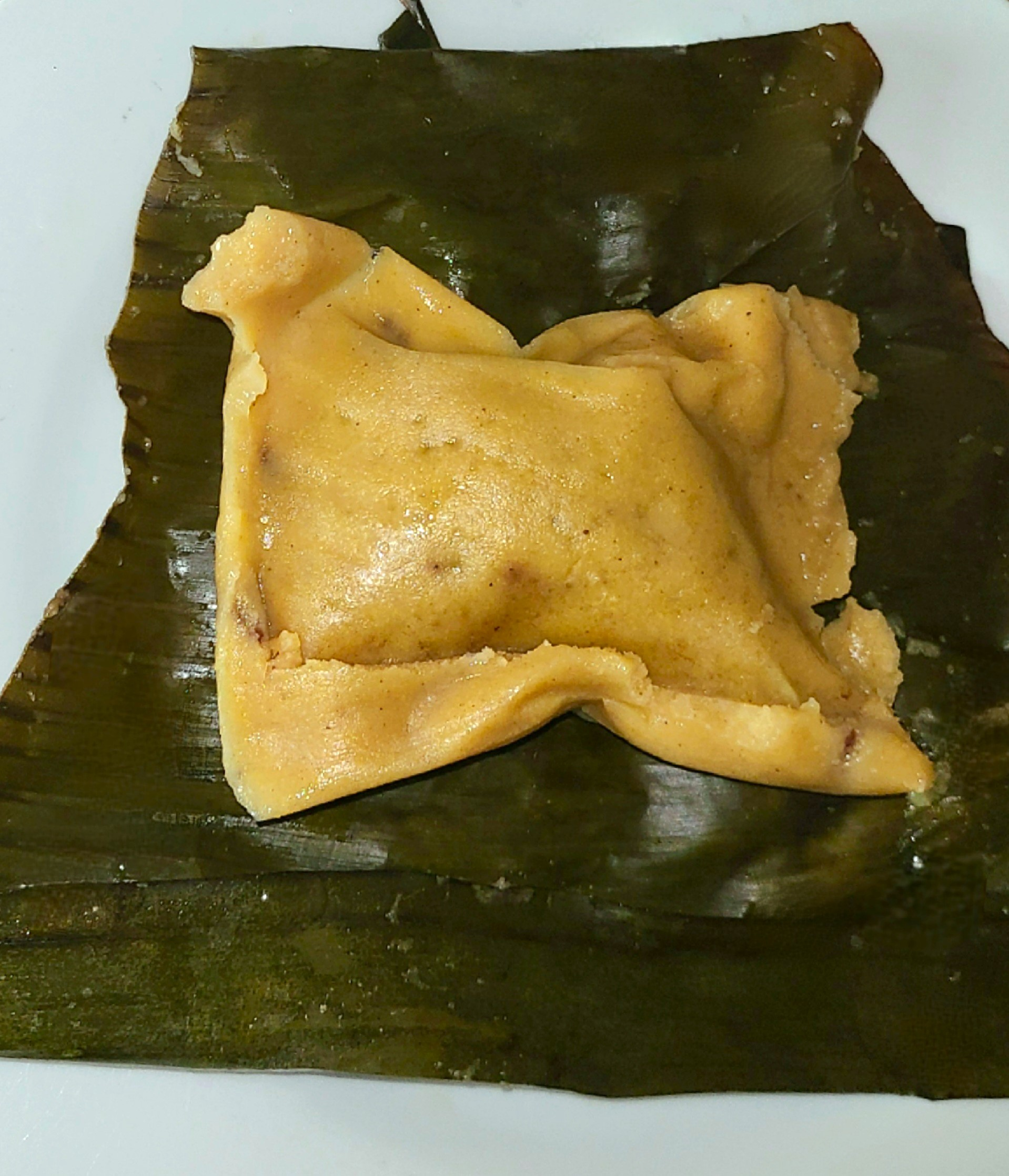
- Duckunoo made with cornmeal, spices, coconut milk, vanilla and raisins in Jamaica
- Alternative names: Tie-a-leaf or blue drawers (Jamaica); doukounou (Haiti); ducana (Antigua); dokoen or dokun (Suriname)
- Type: Sweet starch/dessert
- Place of origin: Caribbean
- Created by: Indigenous Amerindians; Africans
- Main ingredients: Batata, coconut, spices, brown sugar, cornmeal and coconut milk
- Variations: Sweet tamale or tamal dulce; tamalito (in Latin America)

Duckunoo or duckanoo, also referred to as tie-a-leaf, blue drawers (draws), dokonon (in French Guiana), and dukunou (in Haiti), is a dessert in Jamaica, Belize, Haiti, Antigua and Barbuda, St Vincent, French Guiana and some other islands in the Lesser Antilles. It is a variation of tamale, which originated in Mesoamerica as early as 8000 to 5000 BC. The Caribbean dish, which has Amerindian and African influences, is typically made from sweet potato, coconut, cornmeal, spices like cinnamon and nutmeg, brown sugar and vanilla, all tied up in a banana leaf, and then cooked in boiling water. Recipes vary across the region.

== History ==
Duckanoo originated in the Caribbean, and is closely related to the Mesoamerican tamale de dulce or tamal dulce ('sweet tamale'), a popular indigenous dessert in the Americas, especially in Mexico. It is the sweet variation of the more popular savoury tamale, which may date from around 100 AD, according to archaeologists Karl Taube, William Saturno, and David Stuart. The dish was adapted and influenced by West Africans who were brought to the Americas during slavery and indentureship— particularly the Maroons and Garifunas, who intermingled with the Amerindians. In Belize, the dish is rooted in Mayan and African traditions. Corn and sweet potato, which are native to the Americas, were staples of Mesoamericans, and the indigenous Amerindians, the Arawaks, cultivated them in the Caribbean, which could explain their use as key ingredients.

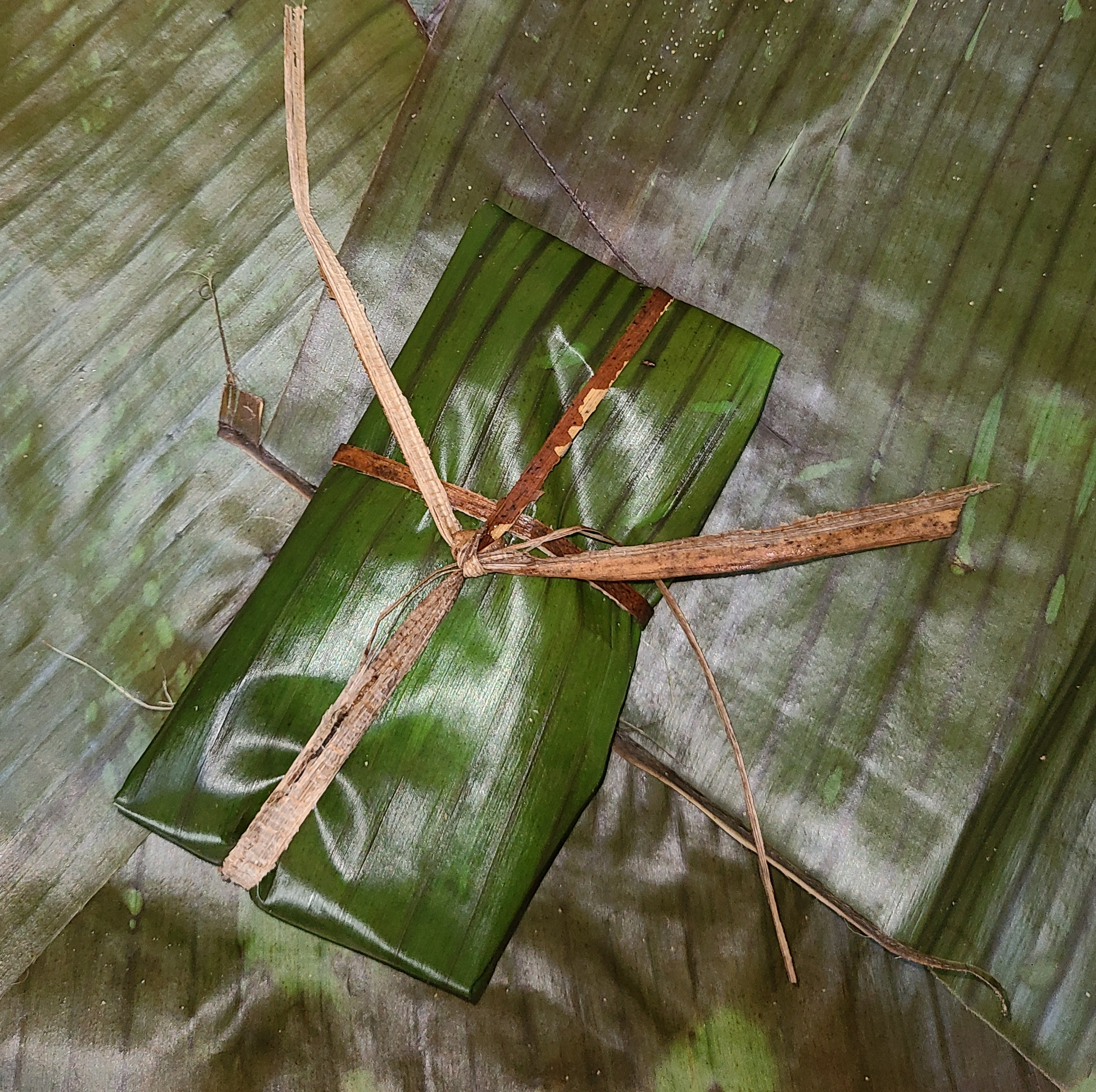
"Blue drawers" in banana leaf

== Etymology ==
In Ghana, there is a dish known as dokono or Odokono in the Twi language, which is made from fermented corn dough. Though this dish is different from the Caribbean dessert, variations of its name have been adopted regionally.

The name "blue drawers" comes from the bluish-green hue that banana leaves may take on after being boiled. In Jamaican Patois, the word "drawers" (pronounced /draaz/) means "underwear", referencing the tied banana leaf wrapping, which resembles old-fashioned, string-tied underwear. In some parishes, particularly Portland, the dish is sometimes called "bollo/boyo" derived from Cuban Spanish, meaning "bun"— a roll of dough (corn, cassava, sweet potato or plantain), seasoned and baked or boiled.

== Variations and similar dishes ==
=== Caribbean ===
==== Lesser Antilles ====
In Antigua and Barbuda, ingredients such as eddoe or dasheen is used, and ducana is often served with okra, eggplant, vegetables and bonavista bean— a popular meal during Easter. Sometimes, other islanders use pumpkin, plantain-flour or regular flour as a substitute for cornmeal, butter and raisins. The dish is called paime, in Trinidad and Tobago, which is eaten especially at Christmas. The more savoury version is called pastelle— also prepared in Puerto Rico, the Dominican Republic and Colombia, and is similar to tamale, hallaca (from Venezuela) or ayaka (from Aruba, Bonaire and Curaçao). In St Lucia, paime also called penmi, is typically eaten on Jounen Kwéyòl or Creole Day.

==== Greater Antilles and Belize ====
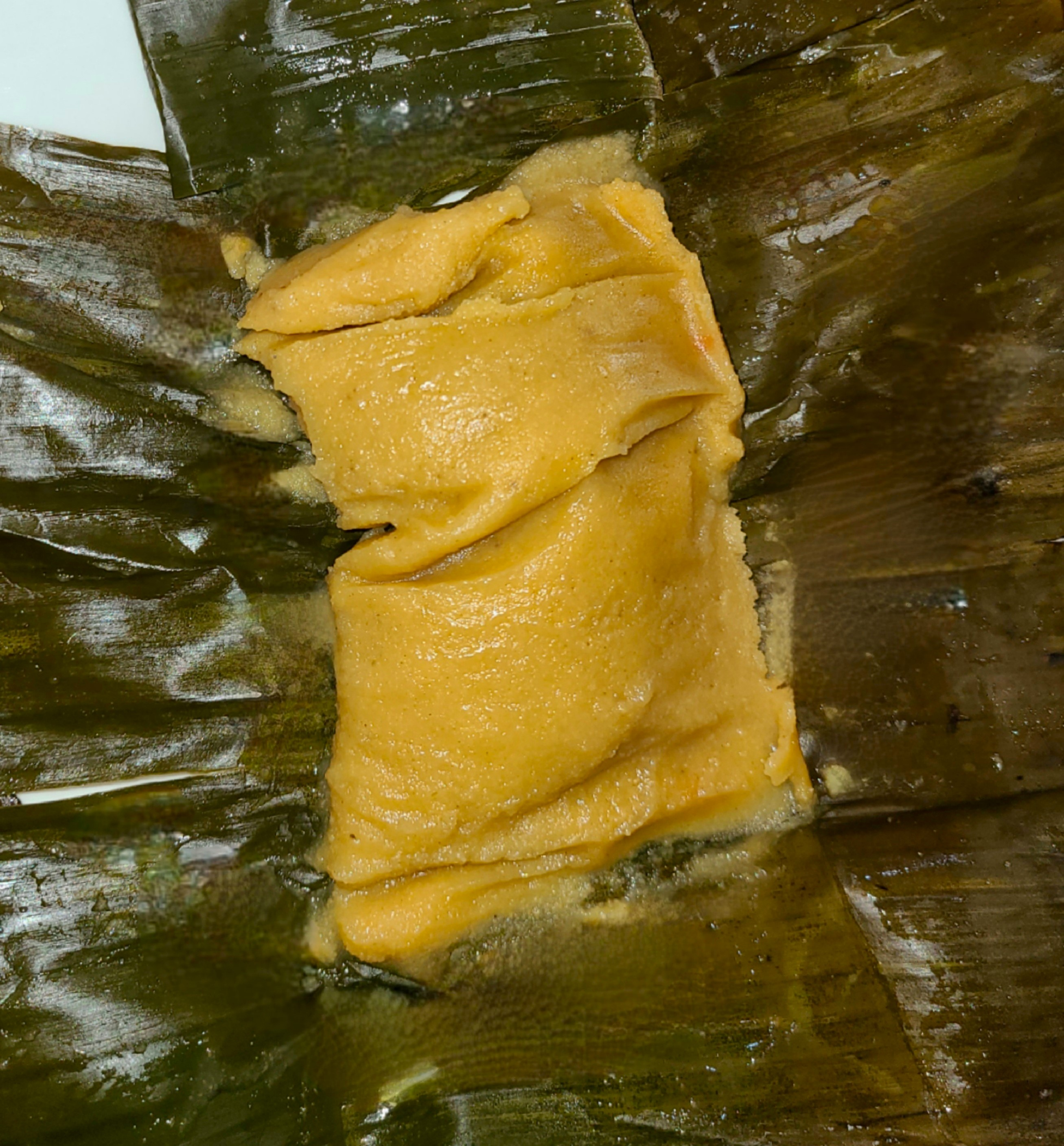
Duckanoo made with cornmeal

In Jamaica, common ingredients include grated green banana, coconut, sweet potato and/or cornmeal with coconut milk, brown sugar, mixed spices (cinnamon, nutmeg and anise) and vanilla— raisins are optional. It can be served with an orange sauce. Blue drawers or tie-a-leaf is eaten as a dessert or snack and is typically seen at cultural or heritage celebrations.

In Haiti, doukounou is considered a sweet or savoury dish eaten as a breakfast or dessert. It is made with cornmeal, milk, sugar, cinnamon, raisins, vanilla extract and eggs, and is served with a sweet sauce.

There is a similar dish of Taíno origin called guanime dulce in Puerto Rico, which is prepared with cornmeal or corn flour, coconut milk and sugar/honey or molasses. It can also include ripe plantain, raisins, vanilla and anise.

In Belize, the dish is called dukunu, tamalito or ducunu which is said to be the Garifuna word for 'boiled corn'. It is traditionally sold by street vendors on bicycles. It includes cornmeal, sweet corn, sugar, butter, baking powder and coconut milk.

=== Latin America ===
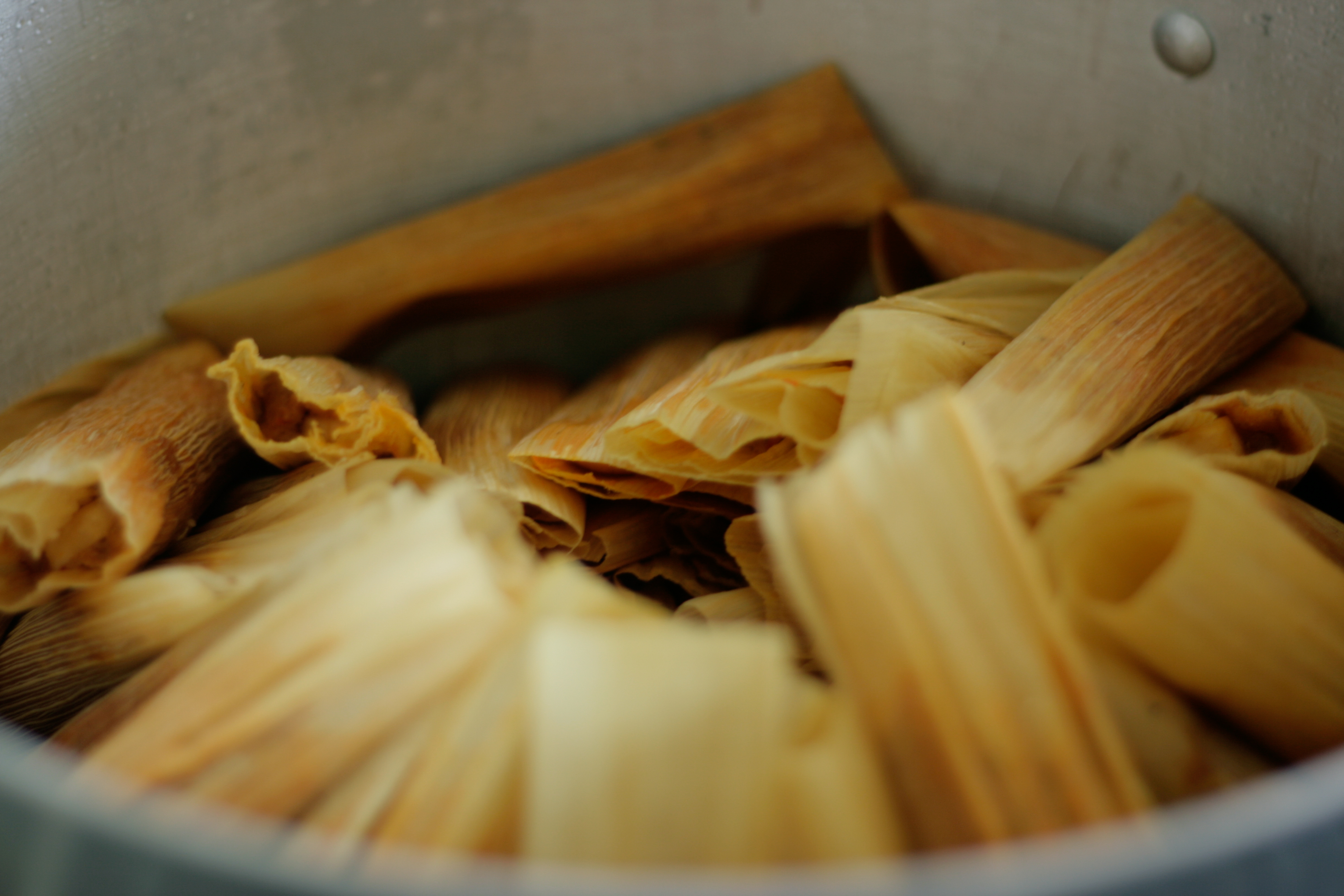
Tamales dulces in La Morita, Nuevo León, México

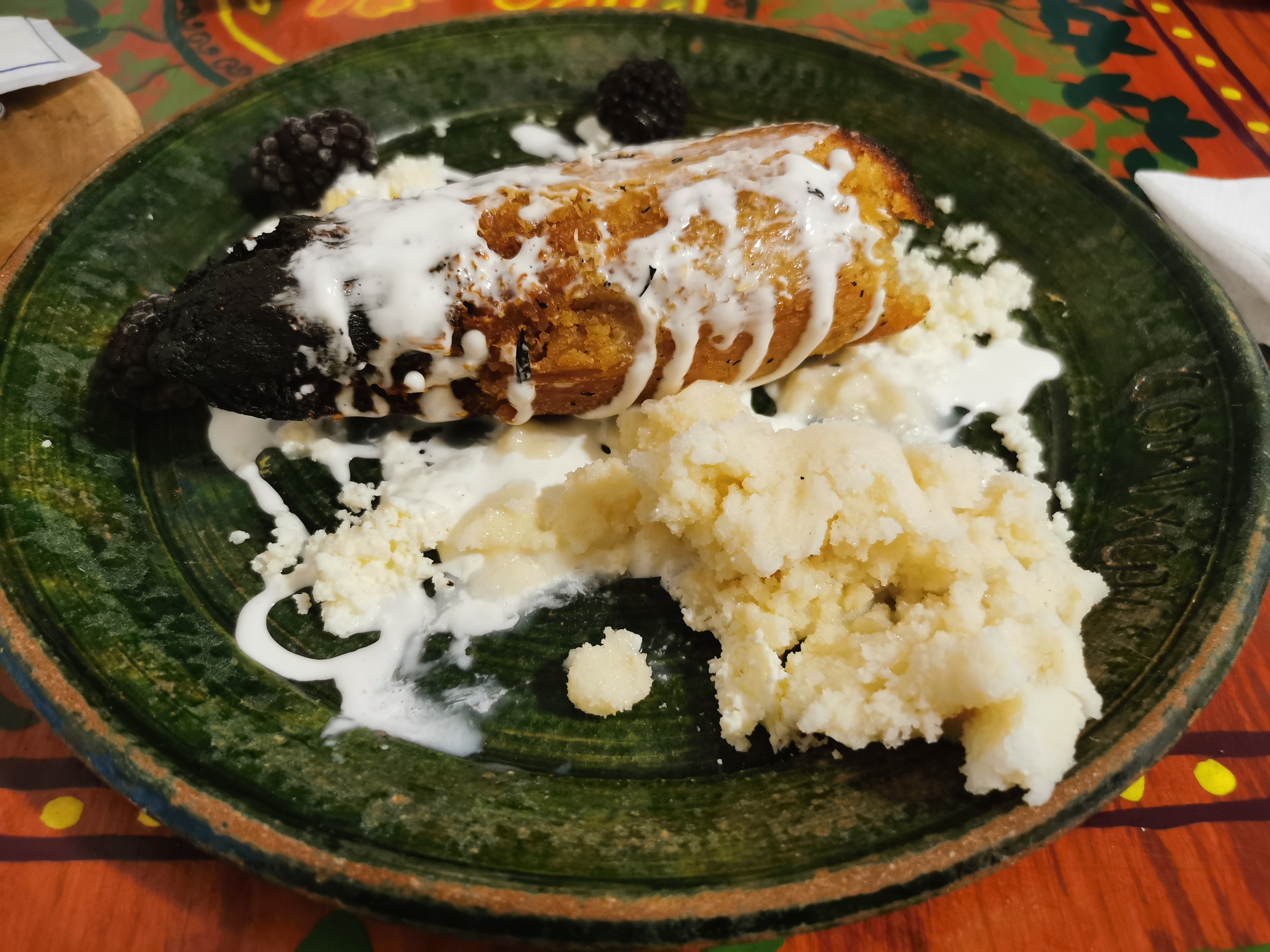
Tamal de elote with cream

==== Central America ====
In Latin America, particularly Mexico, there are a variety of sweet tamales and tamalitos which are made in different colours and flavours, with masa instead of cornmeal, and cooked in corn husks. Ingredients include sugar, cinnamon, raisins, nuts, fruits or fruit preserves like pineapple, strawberry and peach, cajeta or dulce de leche and chocolate. They are typically eaten on Día de la Candelaria, during Christmas and other holidays, and as a common street food. In Oaxaca, Mexico, they are eaten for breakfast. A similar dish called chepo or uchepo from the Tierra Caliente region (Michoacán and Guerrero), is made with corn, milk, baking powder, sugar, cinnamon, vanilla, butter and/or crème fraîche. It may be served with green tomatillo salsa, queso fresco or covered in sweetened condensed milk. It is typically eaten during the summer.

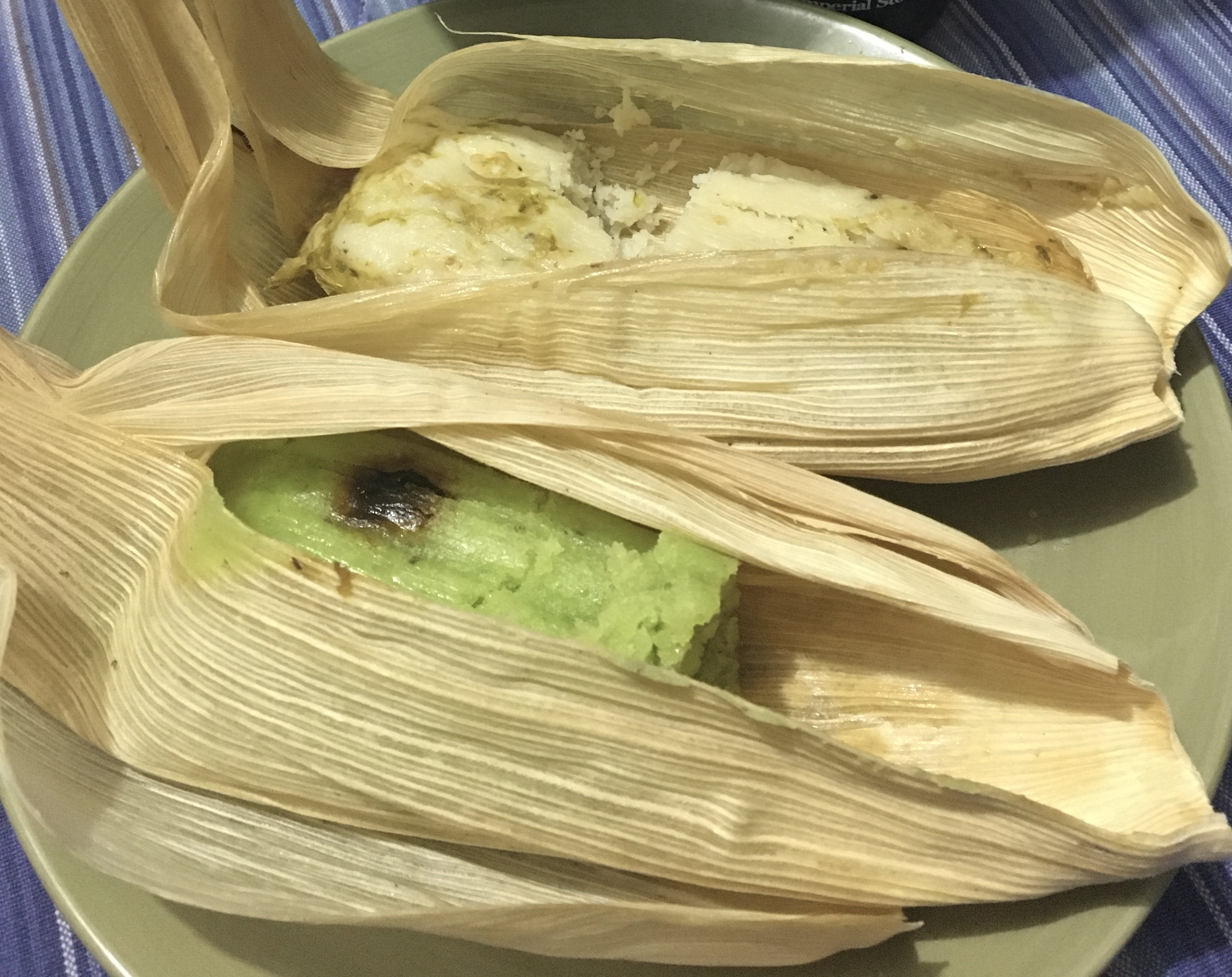
Tamales verdes (salado y dulce)— green tamales (salty and sweet)

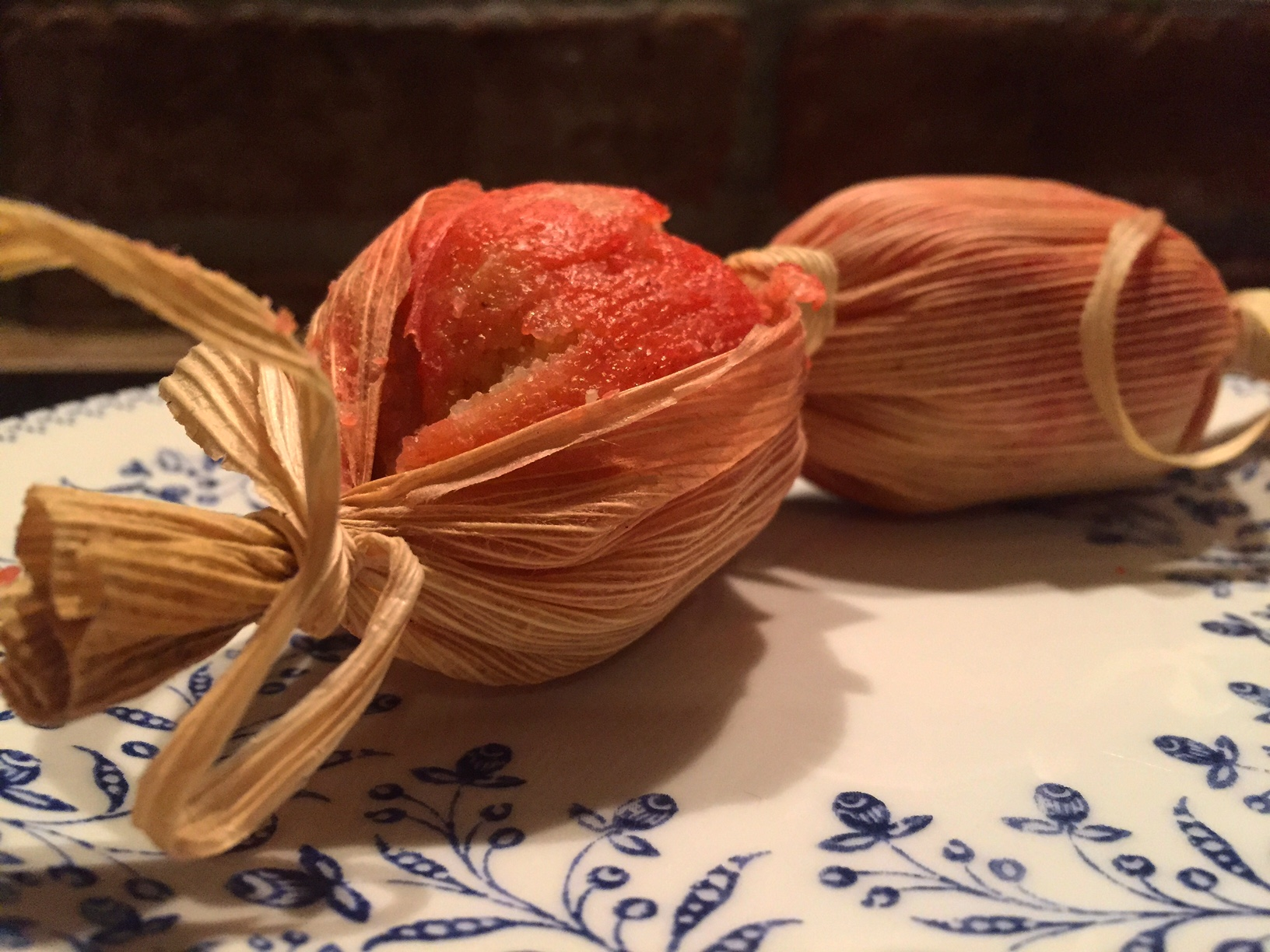
Guatemalan tamal de cambray

Similarly, in Guatemala, tamales or tamalitos de elote are made with corn instead of masa, brown sugar, cinnamon, vanilla and/or cheese, cream and raisins. Tamal de cambray is another traditional dessert usually prepared for special occasions and Christmas. It is made with raisins, almonds or prunes, pink sugar or colouring, margarine and masa with cinnamon or anise water. Tamalito is also made in Honduras, and it is a popular street food. Ingredients include corn, sugar, salt and milk, with butter and/or cheese.

Nicaraguan sweet tamale or yoltamal can be made with masa, corn, evaporated milk, sugar, cinnamon, vanilla and fruits/fruit preserves. It is served with cream/crème fraîche or queso fresco.

In Costa Rica, a variation called tamal dulce de elote or tamalitos de elote is made, usually for Christmas or Holy Week (Semana Santa). Ingredients include corn (grated or ground) or masa, sugar, butter/margarine, cream, flour, vanilla and/or cheese. The mixture is wrapped in banana/plantain leaves or corn husks, and then baked.

==== South America ====
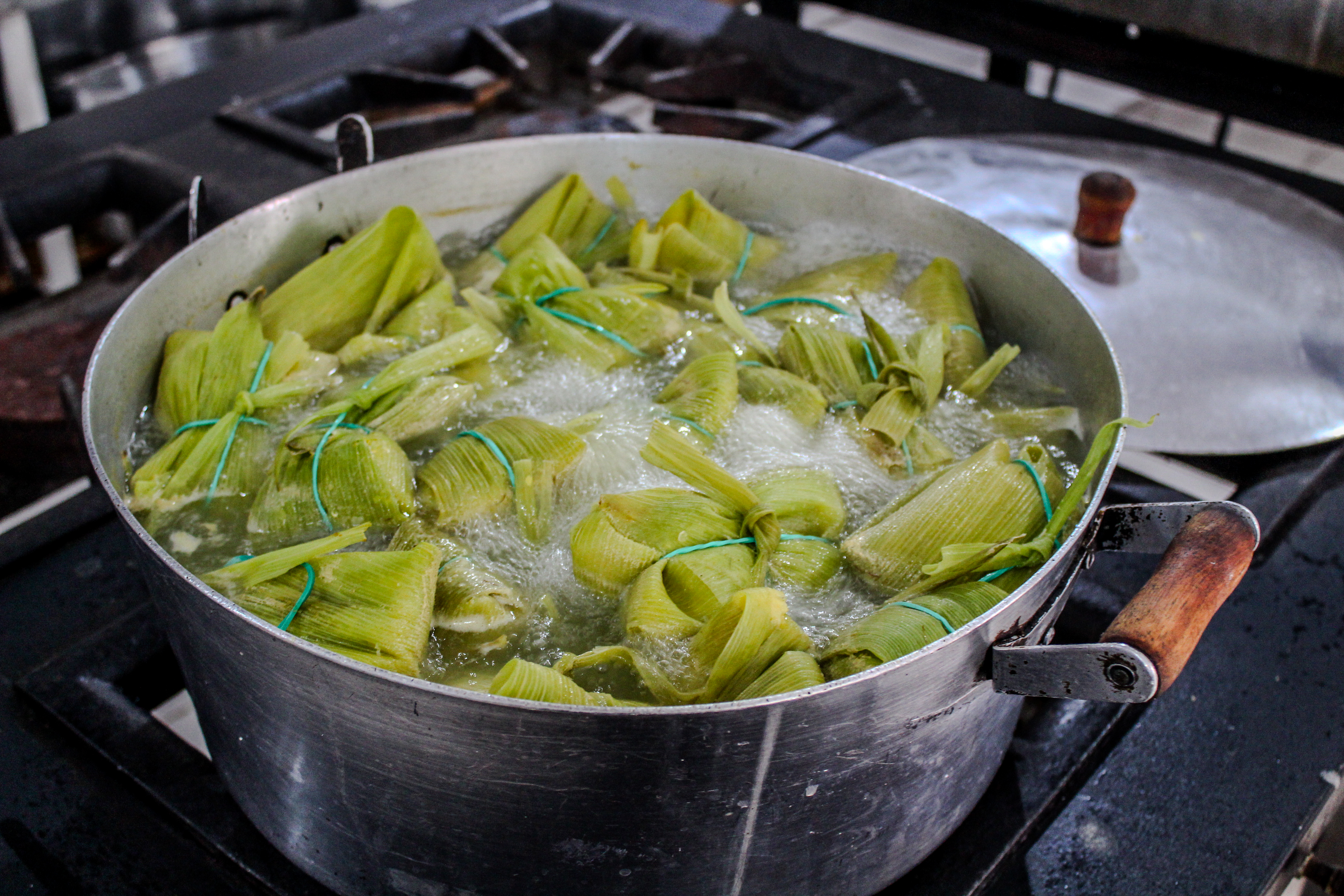
Pamonhas, traditional indigenous Brazilian dessert being boiled

In Brazil, pamonhas are made with grated or ground corn, sugar, coconut milk, butter, cinnamon and/or coconut, and then boiled in corn husks or banana leaves. They are indigenous to the northeastern region, and can be found in Minas Gerais, Goiás, Mato Grosso, Rondônia, São Paulo, Paraná and Tocantins. In some regions, the dish resembles a corn cake wrapped in banana leaves, later dissolved in sugar and water when served, hence the name garapa de pamonha. Pamonhas are widely consumed during Festas Juninas, a festival which coincides with Brazil's harvest of corn and the end of the rainy season. They are sold in shops or by street vendors as a sweet snack or dessert. The name "pamonha" comes from the indigenous Tupi-Guarani word pa'muna meaning 'sticky', which might describe the dish's consistency.

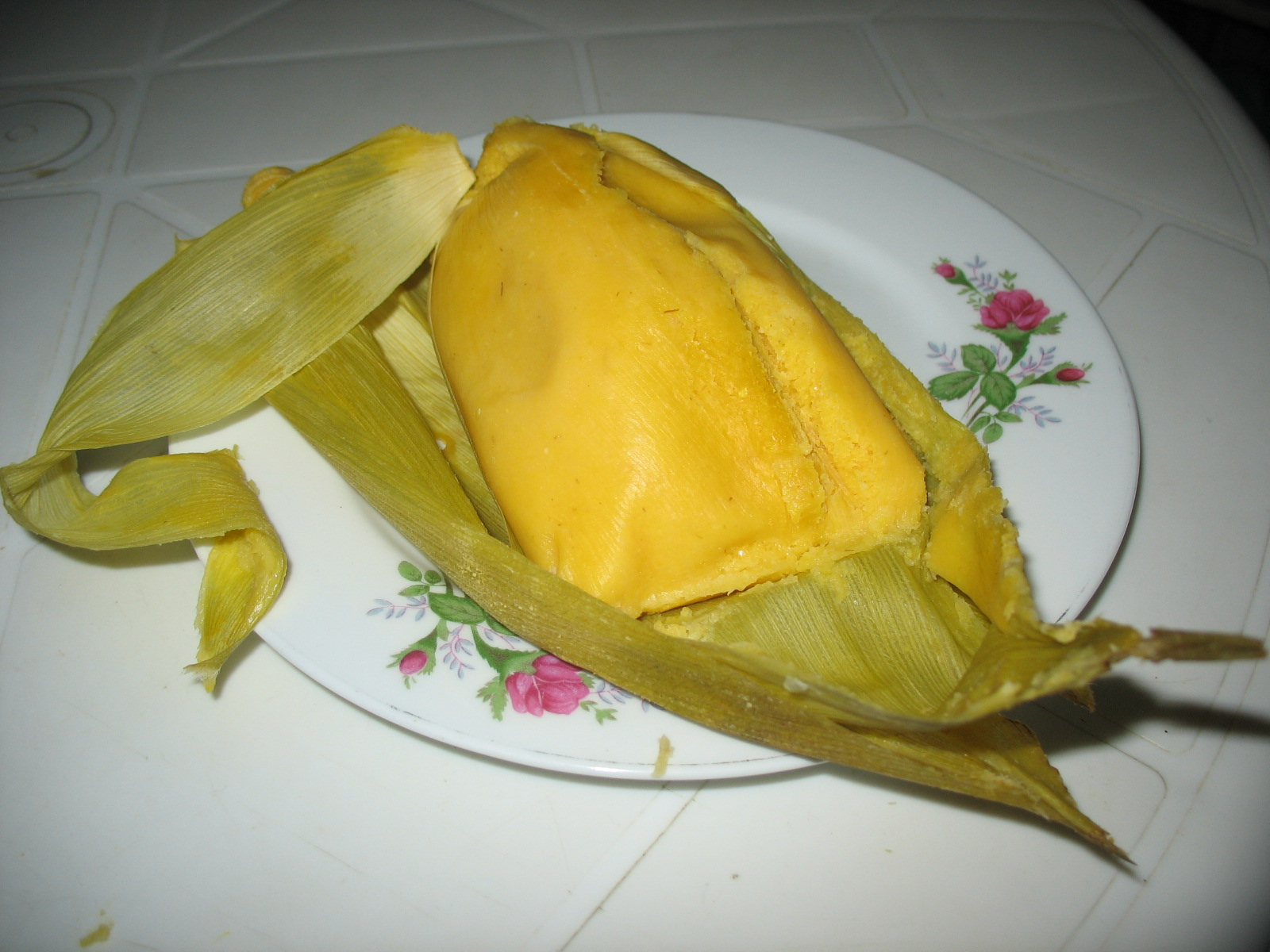
Bollo de Mazorca. There are many types of sweet bollos (envueltos) made with similar ingredients to duckunoo

There are many other variations of sweet tamales, humitas (humintas) or bollos (envueltos), similar to duckunoo and the other regional variations mentioned, which are made in Panama, Peru, Bolivia, Ecuador and Colombia. In the central Andes region, sweet humitas are made with fresh corn, butter, sugar, cinnamon, vanilla, evaporated milk, anise and raisins. They are wrapped in corn husks and can be cooked in boiling water, in a pachamanca oven, or steamed. Bollos can be made with masa, cornmeal, plantain, batata (sweet potato) or cassava/yuca. They are boiled in corn husks, sugarcane leaves or banana leaves. Depending on the type, other ingredients may include coconut, pumpkin, sugar, honey, vanilla, cheese, panela, anise, cinnamon, milk and/or banana (ripe or green).

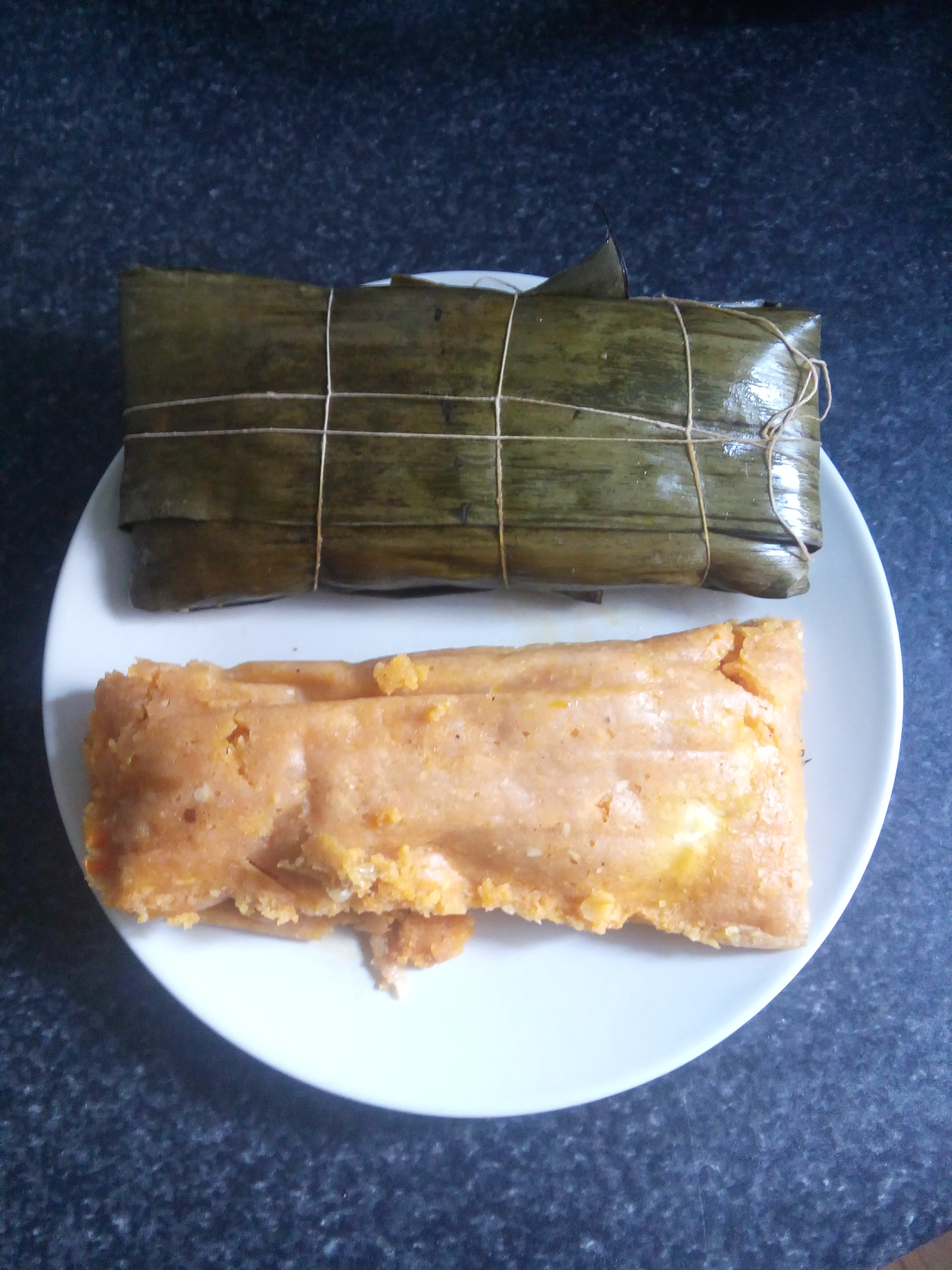
Peruvian envueltos cooked in plantain leaf

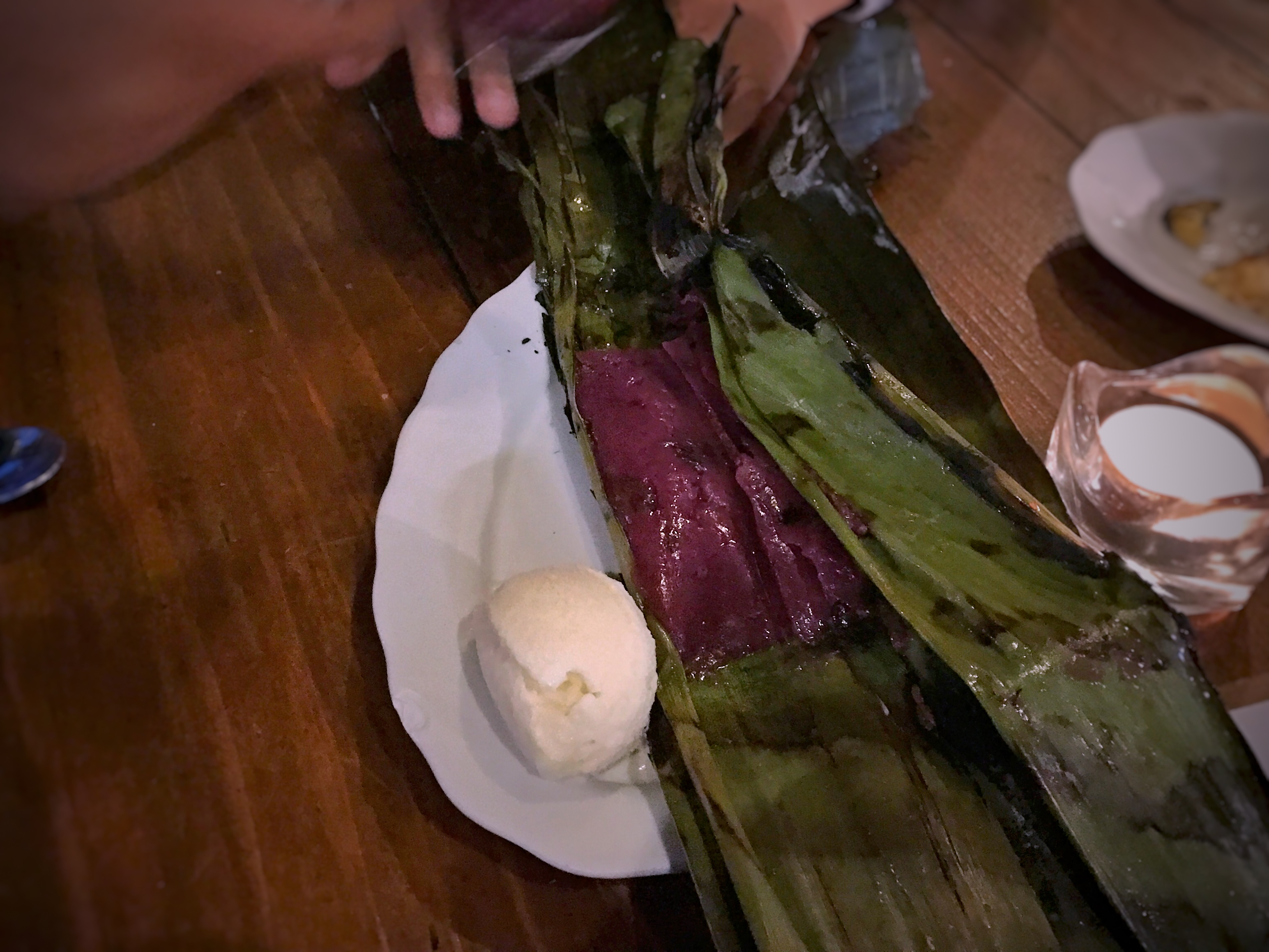
Tamalito de mora (blueberry tamalito) with ice cream, in Valle de Guadalupe, Mexico

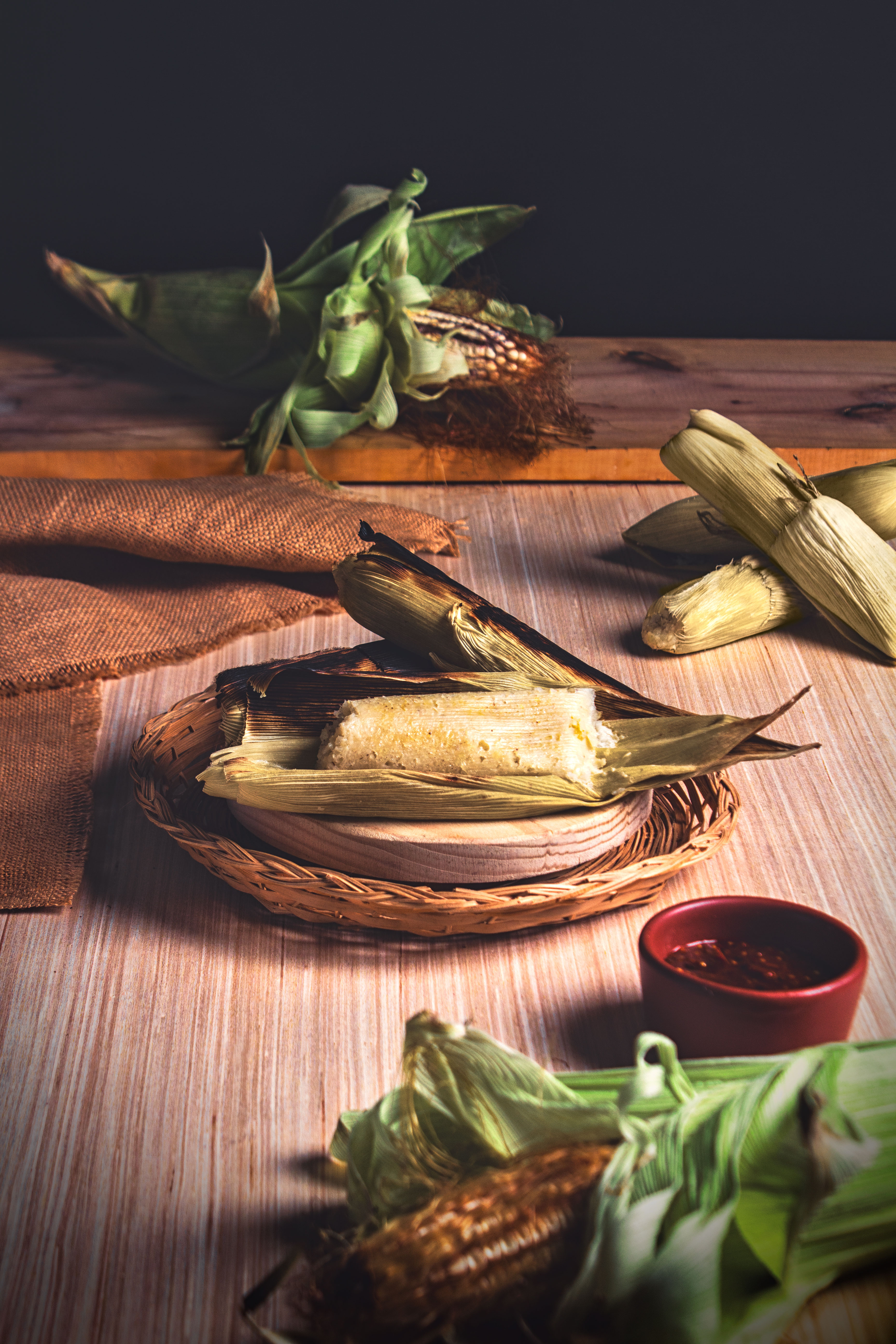
Tamalito de elote

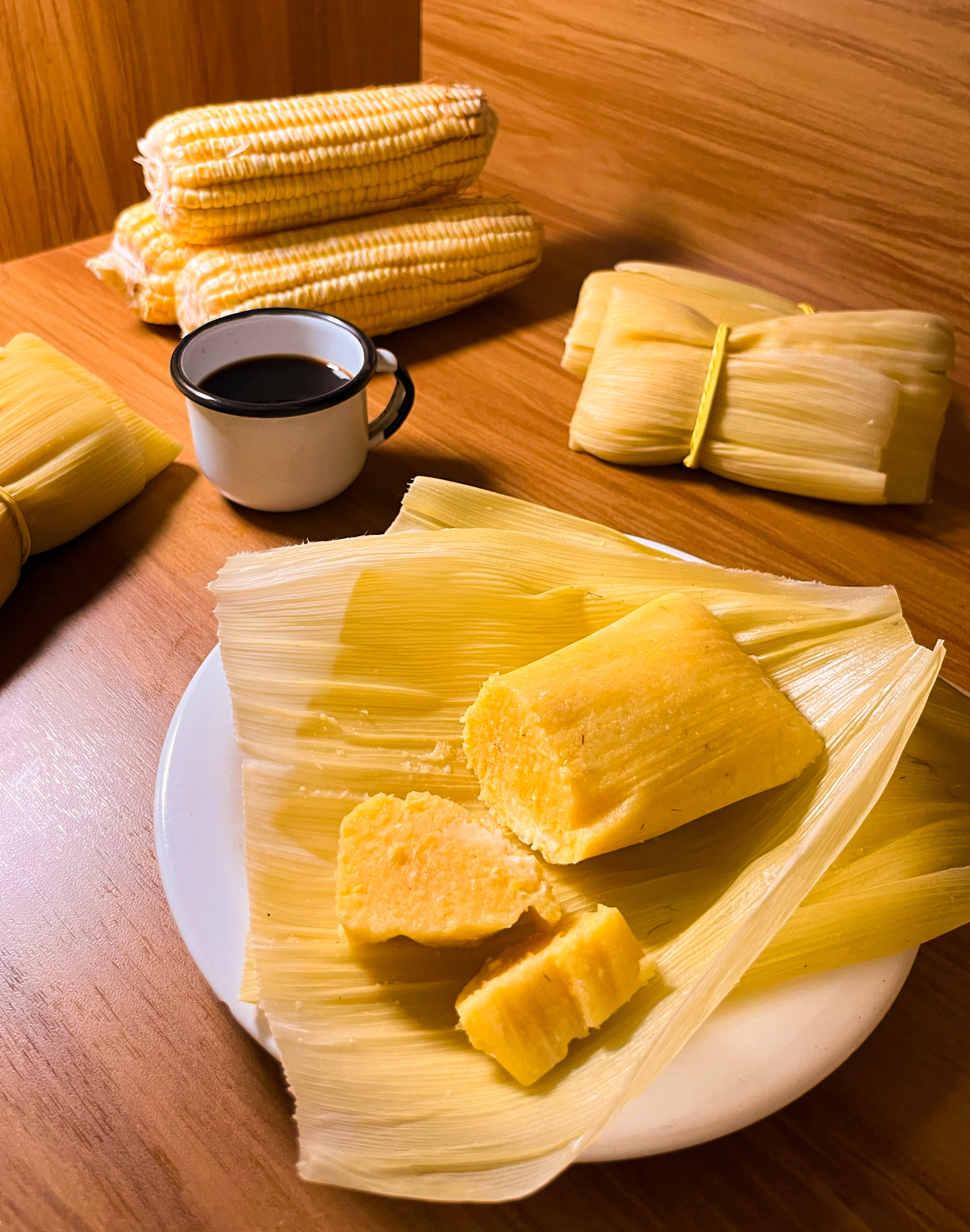
Brazilian pamonhas

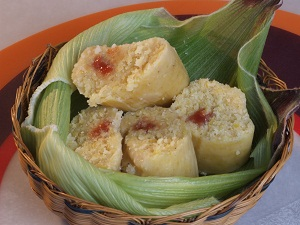
Guatemalan envueltos/bollos made with corn

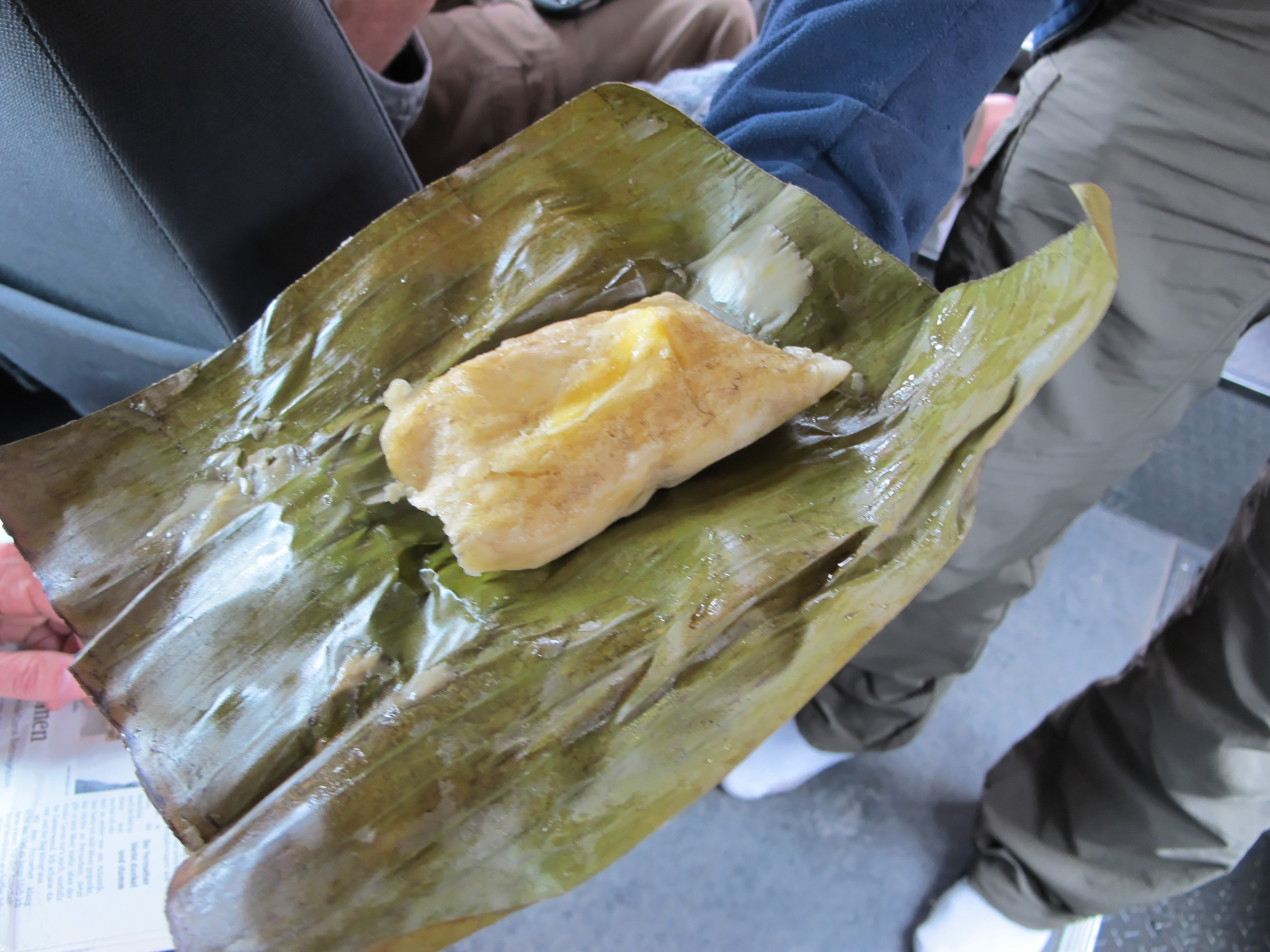
Ecuadorian quimbolitos made with corn flour/cornmeal, sugar, raisins, butter, eggs and cheese

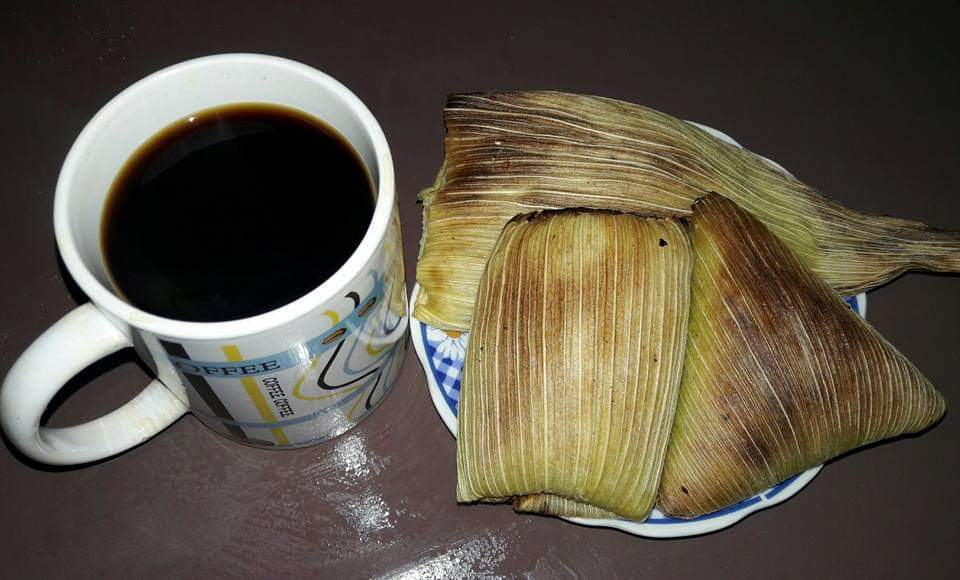
Bolivian humintas made with corn, anise, sugar, cinnamon and a little oil

== See also ==
- Ducana
- Guanime
- Hallaca
- Pasteles
- List of desserts
- List of dumplings
