= Index of French Guiana–related articles =

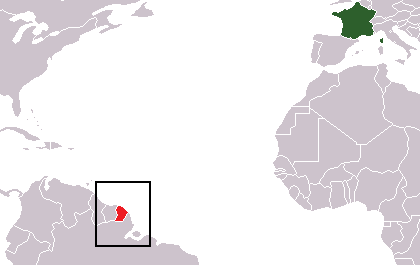
The location of the French overseas department of Guiana (Région Guyane)

Articles related to the French overseas department of Guiana (Région Guyane) include:

== 0–9 ==
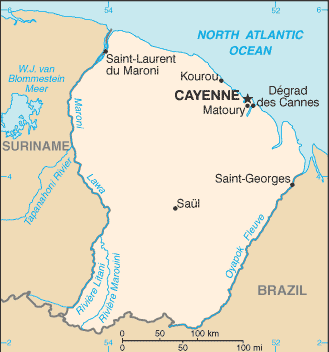
A map of French Guiana

- .gf – Internet country code top-level domain for French Guiana

== A ==
- Abounamy
- Acarouany
- Adjacent countries:

Brazil
Suriname

- Air Guyane Express
- Airports in French Guiana
- Akouménaye
- Alicoto
- Aluku
- Americas
  - South America
    - North Atlantic Ocean
      - Islands of French Guiana
- Anarchism in French Guiana
- Andrée-Rosemon Hospital
- Apatou
- Approuague
- Arrondissement of Cayenne
- Arrondissement of Saint-Laurent-du-Maroni
- Arrondissements of the Guyane department
- Aruã people
- Atipa
- Atlantic Ocean
- Atlas of French Guiana
- Awala-Yalimapo
- Awara broth

== B ==
- Balaté
- Bélizon
- Bienvenue, French Guiana
- Birds of French Guiana
- Boniville

== C ==
- Cacao, French Guiana
- Calou
- Camopi
- Camopi (river)
- Canton of Approuague-Kaw
- Cantons of the Guyane department
- Capital of French Guiana: Cayenne
- Carib language
- Carnival in Cayenne
- Carnival in French Guiana

The Coat of arms of French Guiana

- Categories:
  - Category:French Guiana
    - Category:Buildings and structures in French Guiana
    - Category:Communications in French Guiana
    - Category:Culture of French Guiana
    - Category:Economy of French Guiana
    - Category:Education in French Guiana
    - Category:Environment of French Guiana
    - Category:French Guiana-related lists
    - Category:Geography of French Guiana
    - Category:Government of French Guiana
    - Category:History of French Guiana
    - Category:French Guianan people
    - Category:Politics of French Guiana
    - Category:Prisons in French Guiana
    - Category:Society of French Guiana
    - Category:Sport in French Guiana
    - Category:Transport in French Guiana
  - commons:Category:French Guiana
- Cayenne Cathedral
- Cayenne – Capital of French Guiana
- Cayenne-Rochambeau Airport
- Charvein
- Christiane Taubira
- Cities of French Guiana
- Clément, French Guiana
- Coat of arms of French Guiana
- Communes of the Guyane department
- Communications in French Guiana
- Coopérative de Pêche de Guyane
- Cormotibo
- Couac
- Coulor
- Countess (cake)
- Creole galette
- Cuachi

== D ==
- Délices
- Demographics of French Guiana
- Devil's Island
- Dizé milé
- Dominique Vian
- Dry Guillotine
- Dokonon

== E ==
- Economy of French Guiana
- Elections in French Guiana
- Espérance

== F ==
The Flag of France

- Falkland Islands
- Flag of France
- Flag of French Guiana
- Florent Malouda
- France
- French America
- French colonization of the Americas
- French Guiana (Région Guyane)
- French Guiana Creole language
- French Guiana national football team
- French Guianan franc
- French Guianese, adjective and noun
- French language
- French Republic (République française)

== G ==
- Geography of French Guiana
- Grand-Santi
- Guiana Amazonian Park
- Guianan Cuisine
- Guiana Shield
- Guiana Space Centre
- Guisanbourg

== H ==
- Hinduism in French Guiana
- History of French Guiana

== I ==
- Île Portal
- Île Royale
- Île Saint-Joseph
- Iles du Connétable
- Îles du Salut
- Îlet la Mère
- Inini
- Inini (river)
- International Organization for Standardization (ISO)
  - ISO 3166-1 alpha-2 country code for French Guiana: GF
  - ISO 3166-1 alpha-3 country code for French Guiana: GUF
- Iracoubo
- Islands of French Guiana

== J ==
- Jardin botanique de Cayenne
- Javouhey
- Jean-Claude Darcheville
- Jean-Marie Collot d'Herbois

== K ==
- Kaliña
- Kasékò
- Kaw, French Guiana
- Kourou
- Kourou (river)
- Koursibo

== L ==
- La Charbonnière
- Ligue de football de la Guyane
- Lists related to French Guiana:
  - List of airports in French Guiana
  - List of birds of French Guiana
  - List of cities in French Guiana
  - List of French Guiana-related topics
  - List of rivers of French Guiana
- Litani

== M ==
- Macouria
- Mahury
- Malia Metella
- Malmanoury
- Mana, French Guiana
- Maripasoula
- Maroni
- Matoury
- Military of French Guiana
- Montagne d'Argent
- Montsinéry-Tonnegrande
- Music of French Guiana

== N ==
- Nouragues Nature Reserve

== O ==
- Ouanary
- Oyapock

== P ==
- Palikur
- Papaïchton
- Paré-maské balls
- Paul Isnard
- Pointe Béhague
- Pointe Isère
- Politics of French Guiana
- Prison of the Annamites
- Prison of St-Laurent-du-Maroni
- Providence, French Guiana

== R ==
- Régina
- Région Guyane (French Guiana)
- Remire-Montjoly
- Republic of Independent Guyana
- République française (French Republic)
- Rivers of French Guiana
- Roman Catholicism in French Guiana
- Roura
- Route nationale 1

== S ==
- Saint-Élie
- Saint-Georges, French Guiana
- Saint-Jean-du-Maroni
- Saint-Laurent-du-Maroni
- Saint-Nazaire
- Sainte-Rose-de-Lima
- Saramaccan language
- Saramaka, French Guiana
- Saül
- Scouting in French Guiana
- Sinnamary
- Sinnamary (river)
- South America
- South Georgia and the South Sandwich Islands

== T ==
- Tampok
- Tonnegrande
- Touloulou
- Tour of Guiana
- Transport in French Guiana
- Trésor Regional Nature Reserve
- Trois Sauts
- Trou Poisson
- Tumuk Humak Mountains

== U ==
- Ulrich Robeiri
- University of the French West Indies and Guiana

== V ==
- Victor Hugues
- Voltaire Falls

== W ==
- Waki
- Wayampi
- Wikimedia Atlas of French Guiana

== Y ==
- Yaloupi

== See also ==
- List of international rankings
- Lists of country-related topics
- Topic outline of geography
- Topic outline of South America
