= List of cities in French Guiana =

This is a list of cities (communes) in French Guiana:

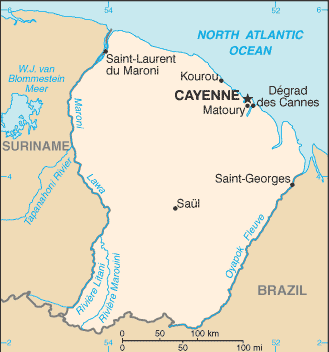
Map of French Guiana

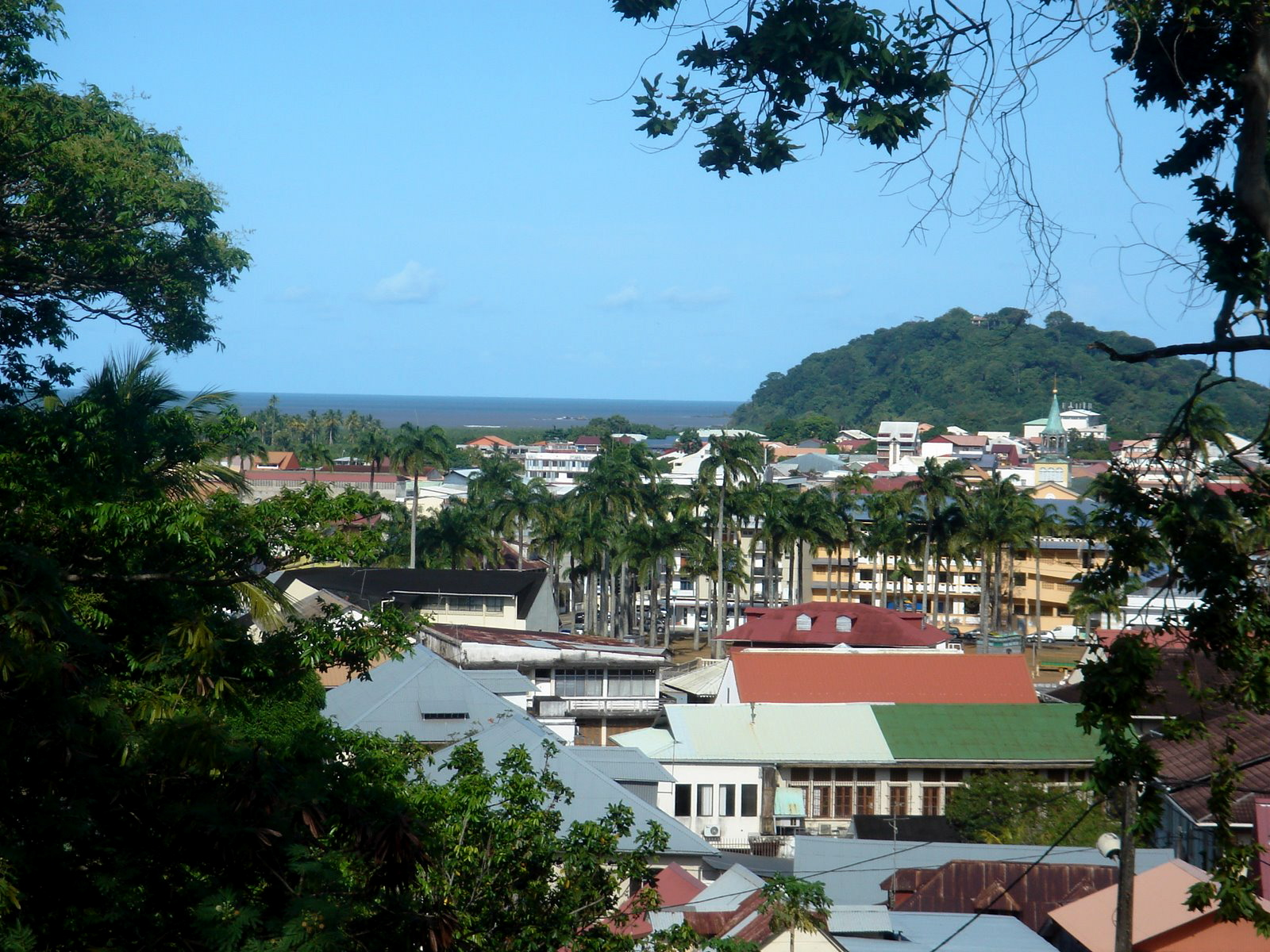
Cayenne, capital of French Guiana

Largest communes in French Guiana
Rank	Communes	Population		Arrondissement
Rank	Communes	1999	2009	Arrondissement
1.	Cayenne	50,594	71,087	Cayenne
2.	Matoury	18,032	34,533	Cayenne
3.	Saint-Laurent-du-Maroni	19,211	28,944	Saint-Laurent-du-Maroni
4.	Kourou	19,171	28,416	Cayenne
5.	Remire-Montjoly	15,555	22,125	Cayenne
6.	Macouria	5 050	13 019	Cayenne
7.	Maripasoula	3 710	8 364	Saint-Laurent-du-Maroni
8.	Mana	5 445	6 271	Saint-Laurent-du-Maroni
9.	Apatou	3 628	5 789	Saint-Laurent-du-Maroni
10.	Grand-Santi	2 862	4 966	Saint-Laurent-du-Maroni
11.	Sinnamary	2 783	3 400	Cayenne
12.	Saint-Georges	2 153	3 276	Cayenne
13.	Roura	1 791	2 621	Cayenne
14.	Iracoubo	1 430	1 579	Cayenne
15.	Camopi	1 032	1 530	Cayenne
16.	Awala-Yalimapo	887	1 344	Saint-Laurent-du-Maroni

== Villages ==
- Acarouany
- Alikoto Tapele
- Antécume-Pata
- Apatou
- Awala-Yalimapo
- Balata
- Balaté
- Bélizon
- Bellevue
- Boniville
- Cacao
- Camopi
- Cayenne
- Charvein
- Clément
- Cormotibo
- Coulor
- Délices
- Élahé
- Espérance
- Grand Santi
- Guisanbourg
- Île Portal
- Iracoubo
- Javouhey
- Kaw or Caux
- Kourou
- Kulumuli
- Macouria
- Malmanoury
- Mana
- Maripasoula
- Matoury
- Montsinéry
- Nouveau Wakapou
- Ouanary
- Paul Isnard
- Pilima
- Pointe Isère
- Providence
- Résidence Arc-en-ciel
- Régina
- Rémire
- Rochambeau
- Roura
- Saint-Nazaire
- Sainte-Rose-de-Lima
- Saül
- Sinnamary
- St-Élie
- St Georges de l'Oyapock
- St-Jean
- St-Laurent du Maroni
- Talhuwen
- Tonate
- Tonnegrande
- Trois-Palétuviers
- Trois Sauts
- Trou Poisson

== See also ==
- Communes of the Guyane département
