= St. Lawrence Church, Saint-Laurent-du-Maroni =

Coordinates: 5.5022°N 54.0282°W

St. Lawrence Church
- Église Saint-Laurent de Saint-Laurent-du-Maroni
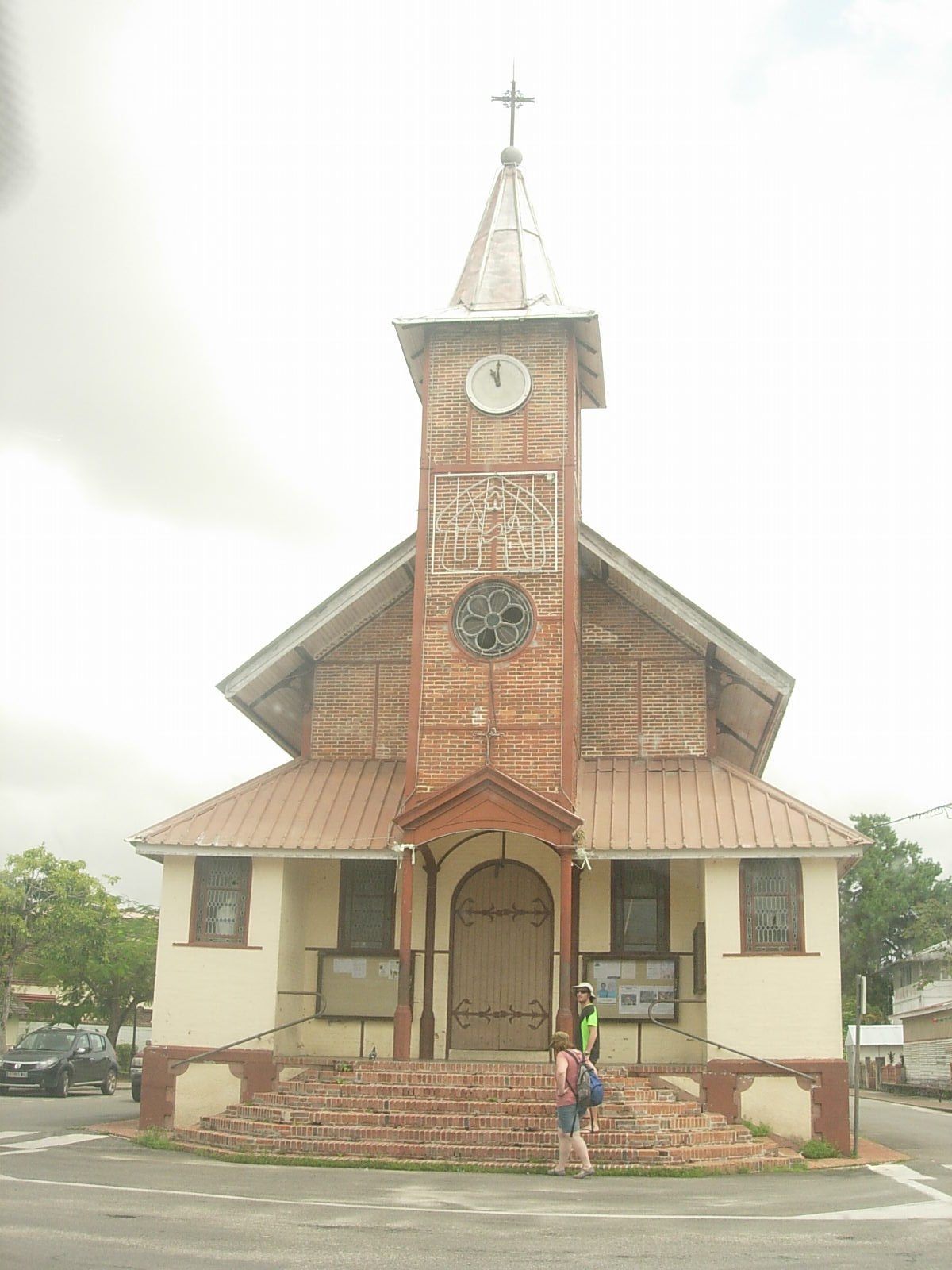
- St. Lawrence Church
- Location: Saint-Laurent-du-Maroni
- Country: French Guiana; France
- Denomination: Roman Catholic Church

The St. Lawrence Church (French: Église Saint-Laurent de Saint-Laurent-du-Maroni) is a religious building that serves as a parish church dependent on the Diocese of Cayenne (Dioecesis Caiennensis or Diocèse de Cayenne) which was created by pope Pius XII with the Bull "Qua sollicitudine" in 1956.

The temple follows the Roman or Latin rite, is located in the town of Saint-Laurent-du-Maroni, French Guiana. The church is listed as a historic monument by a legal provision of 16 August 1995.

It originated in the first chapel dedicated to St. Lawrence opened in 1958. The present church was renovated and reopened in 2006.

== See also ==
- Roman Catholicism in French Guiana
