= Scouting and Guiding in French Guiana =

Scouting and Guiding movement in French Guiana

Scouts de Guyane
- Location: Boîte Postale 10, 97321 Cayenne Cédéx, Guyane Française
- Country: French Guiana

Scouting in French Guiana mainly follows the program of the Scouts et Guides de France (SGdF), but there are also groups of the Éclaireuses et Éclaireurs de France. The SGdF's Région Guyane (also known as Scouts et Guides de Guyane) is an associate member of the Interamerican Scout Region of the World Organization of the Scout Movement.

== History ==
Scouting came to French Guiana in the 1930s. The first group of the Scout de France (SdF) was founded in spring 1934 in Cayenne, inspired by the Eclaireurs de France who were started a couple of years earlier by Samuel Chambaud. It wasn't until the mid of the 1950s that a second group of the Scout de France was formed. In 1958, the movement was large enough to be organised in some districts, but Scouting in French Guiana still was not really stable. The following years saw again the loss of some groups.

== Program ==
Program, sections, Scout Law and Promise of Scouting in French Guiana are the same as in the corresponding organizations in France. The Scout Motto is Sois Prêt (Be Prepared) or Toujours Prêt (Always Prepared) in French, depending on the organization.

There are slight alterations in the uniform due to climate. The Scout emblem incorporates elements of the old coat of arms of French Guiana, as well as the old arms of Guadeloupe and Martinique.

== Groups ==
Scouts et Guides de France has five groups in French Guiana: three in Cayenne; one in Cacao; one in Matoury.

== See also ==
- Scouting in France
