= Charbonnières =

Charbonnières is the name or part of the name of the following communes in France:

- Charbonnières, Eure-et-Loir, in the Eure-et-Loir department
- Charbonnières, Saône-et-Loire, in the saône-et-Loire department
- Charbonnières-les-Bains, in the Rhône department
- Charbonnières-les-Sapins, in the Doubs department
- Charbonnières-les-Varennes, in the Puy-de-Dôme department
- Charbonnières-les-Vieilles, in the Puy-de-Dôme department
- La Charbonnière, a neighbourhood of Saint-Laurent-du-Maroni in French Guiana.
