= Hôtel de Ville, Saint-Laurent-du-Maroni =

Town hall in Saint-Laurent-du-Maroni, French Guiana

Hôtel de Ville
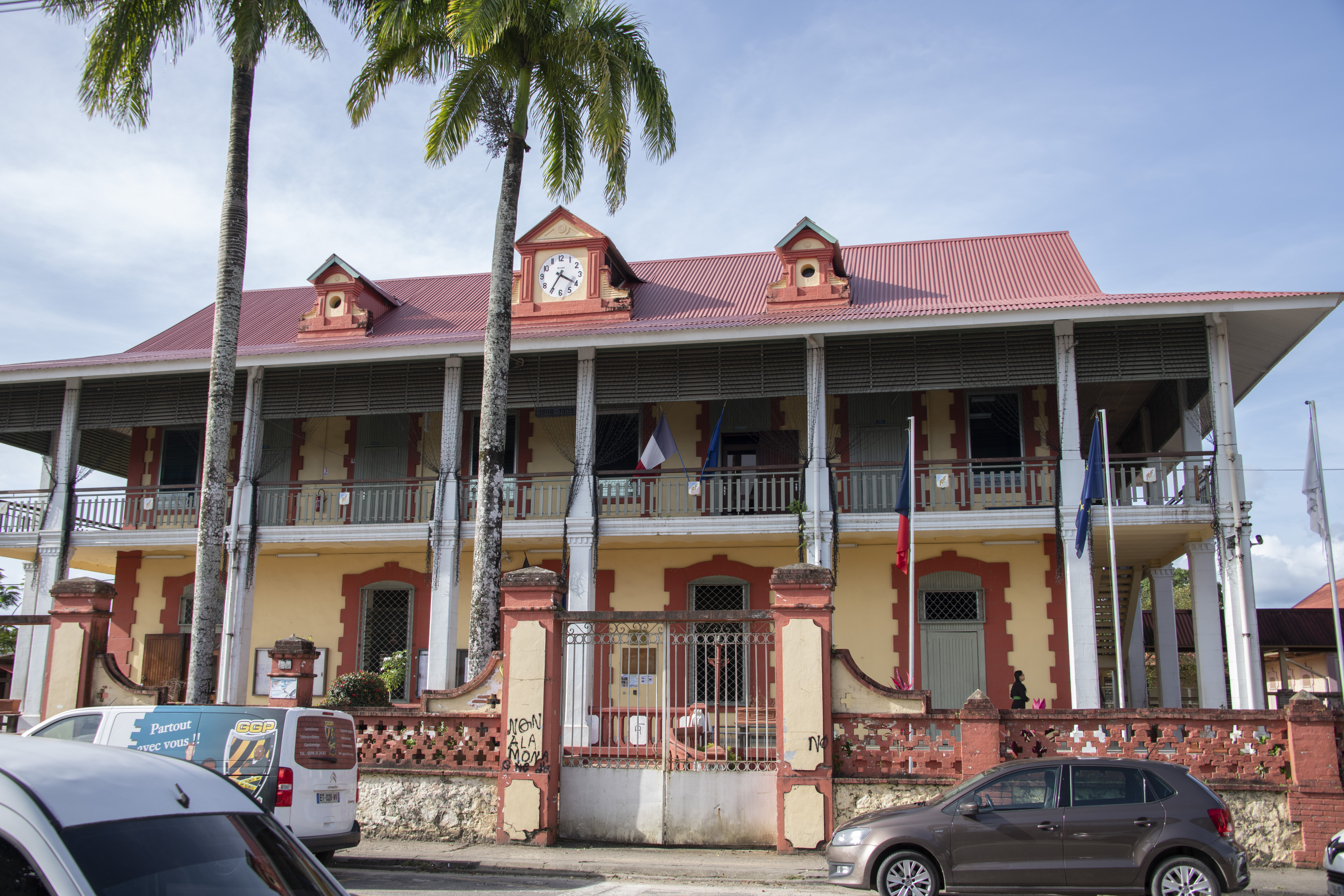
- The main frontage of the Hôtel de Ville in June 2018
- Interactive map of the Hôtel de Ville area

General information
- Type: City hall
- Architectural style: Traditional style
- Location: Saint-Laurent-du-Maroni, French Guiana
- Coordinates: 5.5036°N 54.0290°W
- Completed: 1907

The Hôtel de Ville (French pronunciation: [otɛl də vil], City Hall) is a municipal building in Saint-Laurent-du-Maroni, French Guiana, on the northern coast of South America, standing on Rue du Lieutenant-Colonel Chandon.

== History ==
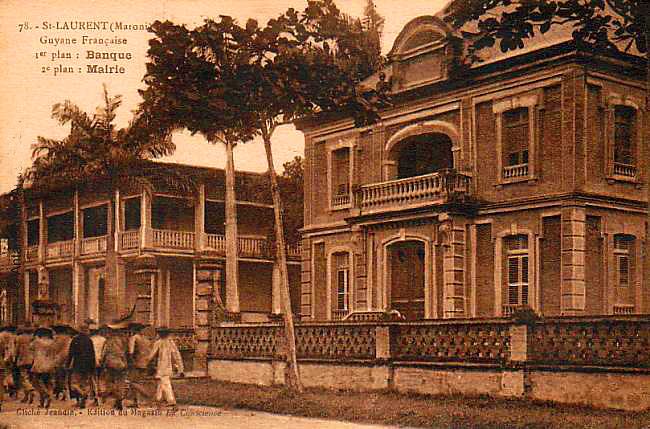
The current town hall (the building on the left) and the first municipal office (on the first floor of the building on the right)

In 1859, the Governor of Guyana, Rear-Admiral Auguste Baudin, established the penal colony of Saint-Laurent-du-Maroni and appointed Nicolas Joseph (Eugène) Mélinon as its first commandant. After Saint-Laurent-du-Maroni was designated a special penitentiary commune in 1880, Mélinon was appointed the ex officio mayor and, as such, head of the commission responsible municipal matters. The municipal buildings were established in what became known as the "officer quarter". This triangular area incorporated well-maintained gardens and former inmates of the penal colony were not allowed there.

The first municipal office was on the first floor of the local branch of the Bank of Guyana. This building was designed in the neoclassical style built in ashlar stone. The design involved a symmetrical main frontage of three bays facing onto what is now Rue du Lieutenant-Colonel Chandon. The central bay featured a small forestair leading up to a segmental headed doorway with a stone surround and a keystone. The doorway was flanked by brackets supporting a balustraded balcony. On the first floor, there was a wide ellipse-shaped window with a keystone and, at roof level, there was a panel, inscribed "Bank of Guyana" with a segmental shaped pediment. The outer bays were fenestrated with segmental headed windows with keystones on both floors. The building was primarily a bank and as such, it served an important role to the community, being the place where local gold miners exchanged their gold for cash and where inmates from the penal colony received a small amount of pocket money before being freed.

After the Radical politician, Gaston Monnerville, successfully persuaded the French Government to close the penal colony in 1946, Saint-Laurent-du-Maroni became a standard civil commune on 9 November 1949. The town council led by its first elected mayor, Joseph Symphorien, took office in 1950 and needed a dedicated town hall. The building they selected was the former administrative headquarters of the penal colony, situated immediately to the northwest of the bank building. The former administrative headquarters had been designed in the traditional style, had been built in brick with a stucco finish and had been completed in 1907. The design involved a symmetrical main frontage of seven bays separated by full-height columns facing Rue du Lieutenant-Colonel Chandon. It featured covered verandas on both floors and a sloping roof designed to discharge large quantities of rain in the wet season.
