= Sainte-Rose-de-Lima =

Sainte-Rose-de-Lima may refer to:

- Rose of Lima, a Catholic saint

== Places ==
- Sainte-Rose, Quebec, a district in Laval, Quebec
- Sainte-Rose-de-Lima, French Guiana, a Lokono village in French Guiana
