= Akouménaye =

Akouménaye Yawakumenay
- Abandoned village
- Location in French Guiana
- Coordinates: 2°57′N 52°24′W
- Country: France
- Overseas region: French Guiana
- Arrondissement: Cayenne
- Commune: Camopi

Population (1960)
  - Total: 0

Akouménaye (also: Yawakumenay) was an Amerindian village of the Wayampi tribe in southeast French Guiana, close to the border with Brazil. The village was established in 1946 near Alicoto by the villagers of Tacouné. In 1949, the village had 8 inhabitants. The village chief was Paul Ilpe Alassouka. In 1960, the village was abandoned.
