= Voltaire Falls =

Waterfall in French Guiana

- Chutes Voltaire
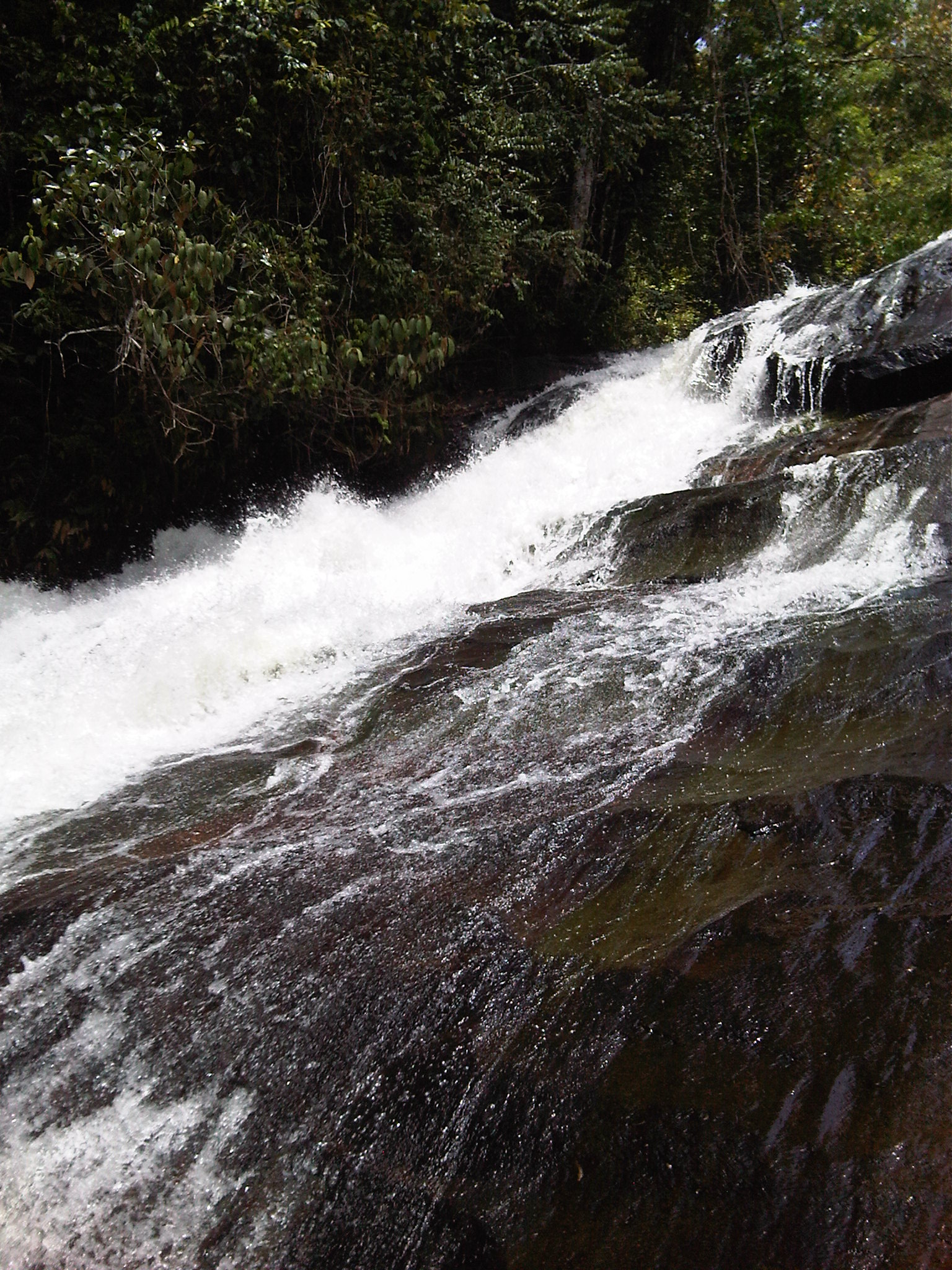

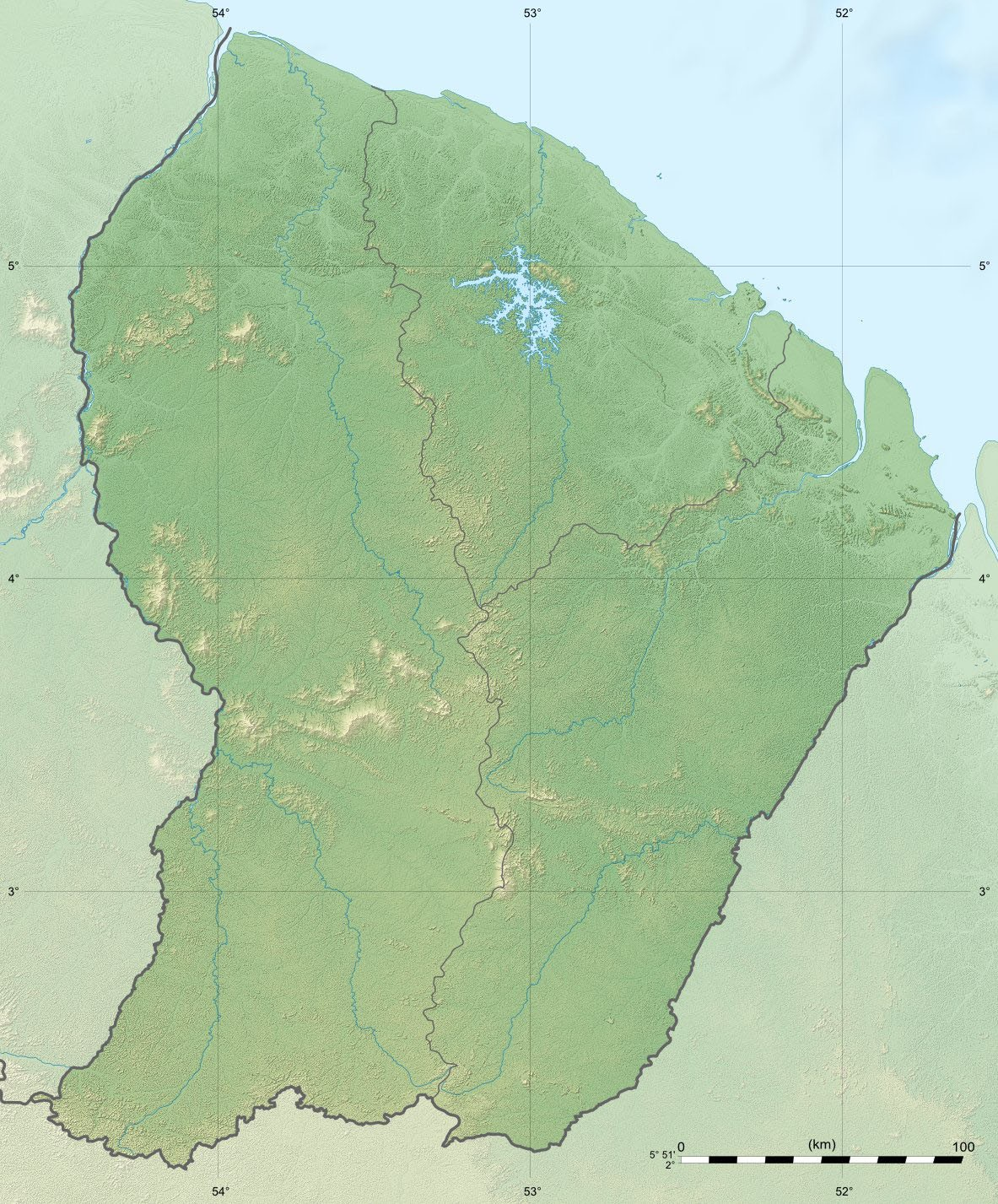
- Location within French Guiana
- Location: Saint-Laurent-du-Maroni, French Guiana, France
- Coordinates: 05°01′54″N 54°05′14″W
- Total height: 35 m (115 ft)
- Watercourse: Voltaire Creek

The Voltaire Falls (French: Chutes Voltaire) are a series of waterfalls in the Voltaire Creek, located near Saint-Laurent-du-Maroni in French Guiana, an Overseas department of France. The Voltaire Falls are the largest waterfalls in French Guiana, with a height of 35 metres. It has been a protected area since 2000.

== Overview ==
The Voltaire Creek is sourced from the Voltaire Inselberg. Downstream, the creek encounters hard granite rock, causing the creek to split into two parts that descend between 35 and 45 metres, depending on the season, in a steep slope of up to 40%. About 200 metres later, the two parts rejoin, confluencing with the Sparouine Creek and continuing onto the Maroni River. The left arm is the widest, however the right arm offers a more impressive view.

An area of 18,000 hectares (44,000 acres) containing the Voltaire Falls and the neighbouring Vieux Broussard Falls have been protected since 2000 by the Office National des Forêts. The area is also important for its flora and fauna, as the rainforest habitat hosts a large number of endemic plant and animal species.

== Transport ==
In 1990, a trail was built to access the falls by car, however a four-wheel drive vehicle is recommended. The distance from Saint-Laurent-du-Maroni is about 70 kilometres. The falls can be reached by taking the road to Saint-Jean-du-Maroni, and then taking the trail to Paul Isnard, with a hike of approximately an hour and a half.

The area is popular for hikers in general, with a number of routes of varying difficulty.
