= Sainte-Rose-de-Lima, French Guiana =

Sainte-Rose-de-Lima
- Village
- Location in French Guiana
- Coordinates: 4.83305°N 52.33622°W
- Country: France
- Overseas region: French Guiana
- Arrondissement: Cayenne
- Commune: Matoury
- Established: 1971

Government
  - Captain: Charles Wingaarde

Population
  - Total: 500

Sainte-Rose-de-Lima is a village of Lokono Amerindians in the commune of Matoury in French Guiana. The village is located on the RN2 near Cayenne – Félix Eboué Airport. It is the largest settlement of Lokono in French Guiana.

== History ==
In 1951, Lokono from Suriname started to migrate to French Guiana mainly for economic reasons. The main villages of origin were Alfonsdorp near the Maroni River, and Matta in the Para District. At first they settled in the existing Lokono village of Balaté near Saint-Laurent-du-Maroni. Later, some migrated to Iracoubo and Cayenne often settling among the Kalina people.

On 13 April 1969, a small plane carrying four people took off from Cayenne – Félix Eboué Airport in bad weather. It struck the tree tops, and crashed in the rainforest. There were no survivors. In order to prevent future accidents, the rainforest in front of the runaway was cleared. In 1971, the Lokono created a settlement in the cleared area. Originally it was called "CD5" after the road running along the village. The Catholic Church built a mission in the village. In 1980, the priest of Matoury, suggested renaming the village "Sainte-Rose-de-Lima" after Rose of Lima.

Sainte-Rose-de-Lima has received access to drinking water and electricity. The land is legally owned by the tribe, and the tribal government is recognized by French Guiana. However, the commune of Matoury refuses building permits citing safety and noise concerns. Other shanty towns, mainly populated by Surinamese Maroons and Brazilians, have been constructed adjacent to Sainte-Rose-de-Lima. In 2020, INSEE counted five shanty towns in the commune.

In 2008, the Federation of Lokono in French Guiana was established and is headquartered in Sainte-Rose-de-Lima. In 1993, the Lokono had been awarded four hectares of communal land (ZDUC). In 2017, the land was controversially sold to a mining company. In 2017, Sainte-Rose-de-Lima was host to the Grand Village, the meeting of all Amerindian tribal chiefs in French Guiana. In June 2020, the village self isolated during the COVID-19 pandemic.

== See also ==
- Balaté, the other Lokono village in French Guiana

== Bibliography ==
- Grenard, Pierre (1981). "La communauté Arawak de Sainte-Rose de Lima" (PDF). Cayenne: L'Office de la Recherche Scientifique et Technique Outre-Mer.
