= Charvein =

- Village
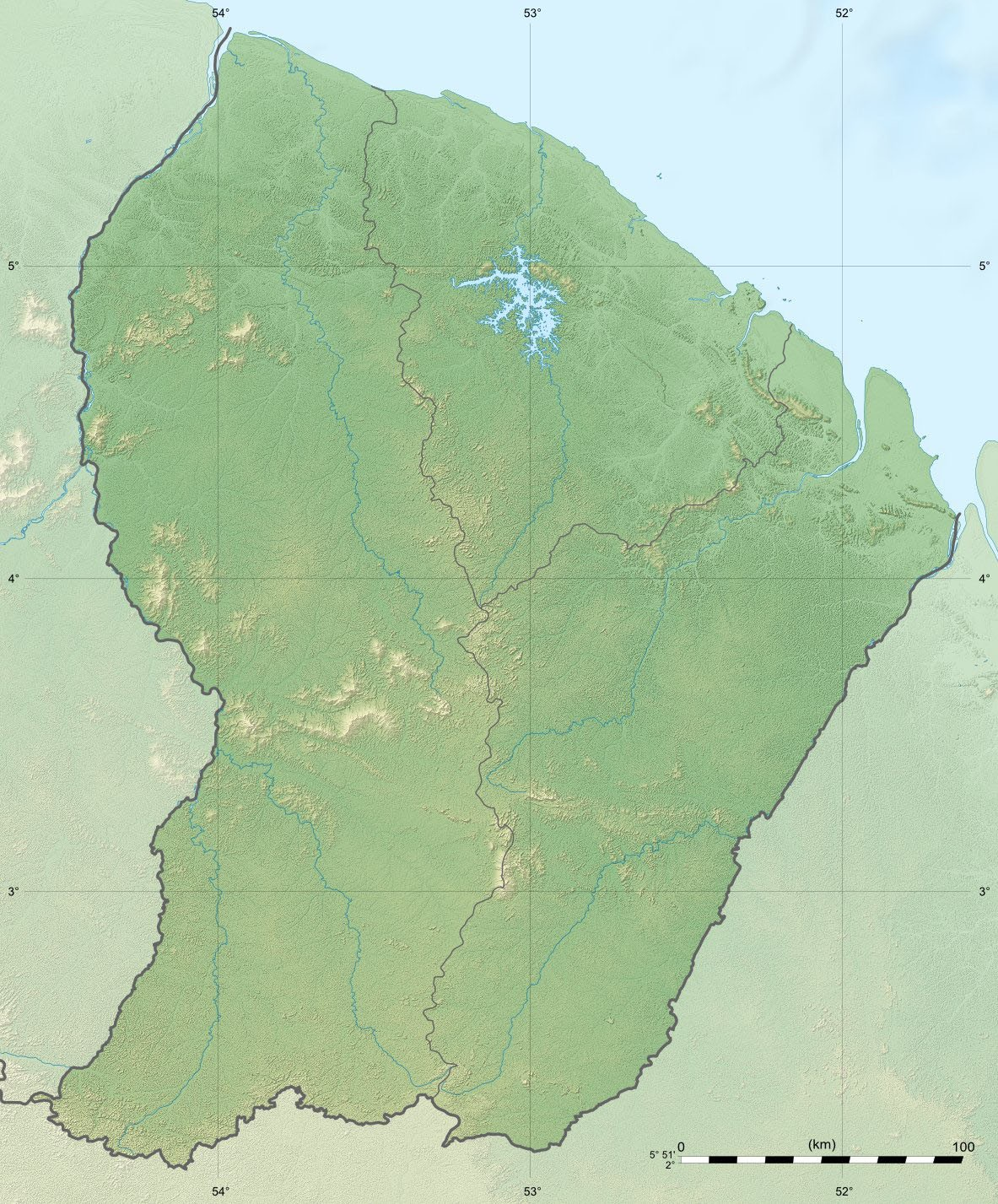
- Location in French Guiana
- Coordinates: 5°34′17″N 53°53′39″W
- Country: France
- Overseas region: French Guiana
- Arrondissement: Saint-Laurent-du-Maroni
- Commune: Mana

Population (2002)
  - Total: 1,600
- Time zone: UTC-03:00 (GFT)

Charvein is a village in the Mana commune of Saint-Laurent-du-Maroni in French Guiana. Charvein was the location of Camp Charvein, one of the most notorious camps of the Prison of St-Laurent-du-Maroni. From 1989 until 1992, Charvein was the location of a Surinamese refugee camp.

== Camp Charvein ==
Charvein started as a little village in the forest where a sawmill was built. In 1895, a subcamp of the Saint-Laurent penal colony was opened for the incorrigibles, the worst prisoners. Colloquially the camp was known as "camp de la mort" (camp of death), because of the appalling mortality rate, and was described as one of the worst camps.

The prisoners had to work naked, in a mosquito infested forest, and had to make 50 boards a day. The guards were notorious for their brutality, and disease was rampant. In 1903, the camp was inspected by Liontel, the Attorney General of French Guiana, who removed the prisoners from the two-person chains, Liontel wrote a report to his superiors about the brutality and murders which had occurred at the camp. His indignation was ignored.

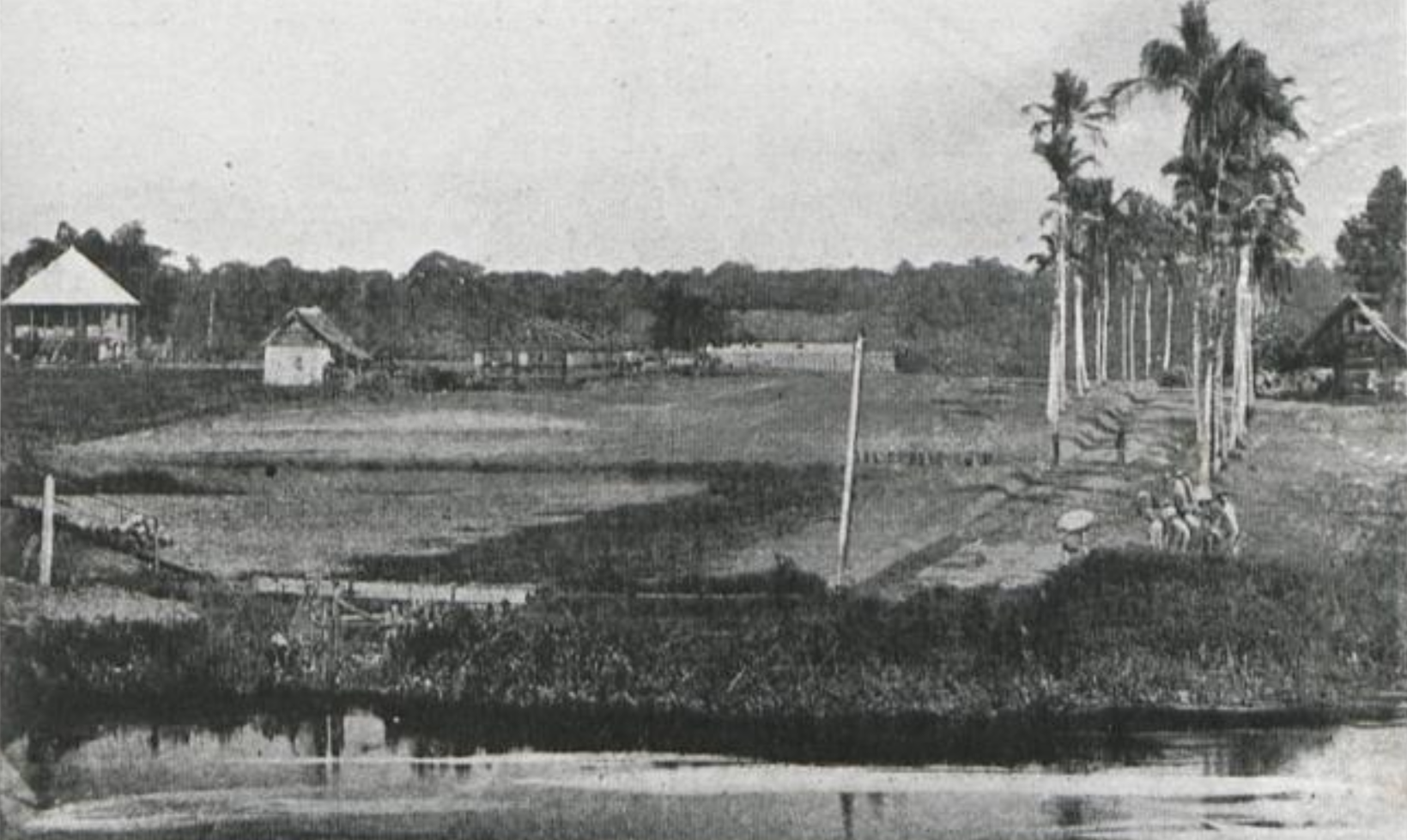
View of the "Incos" camp, Charvein in 1911

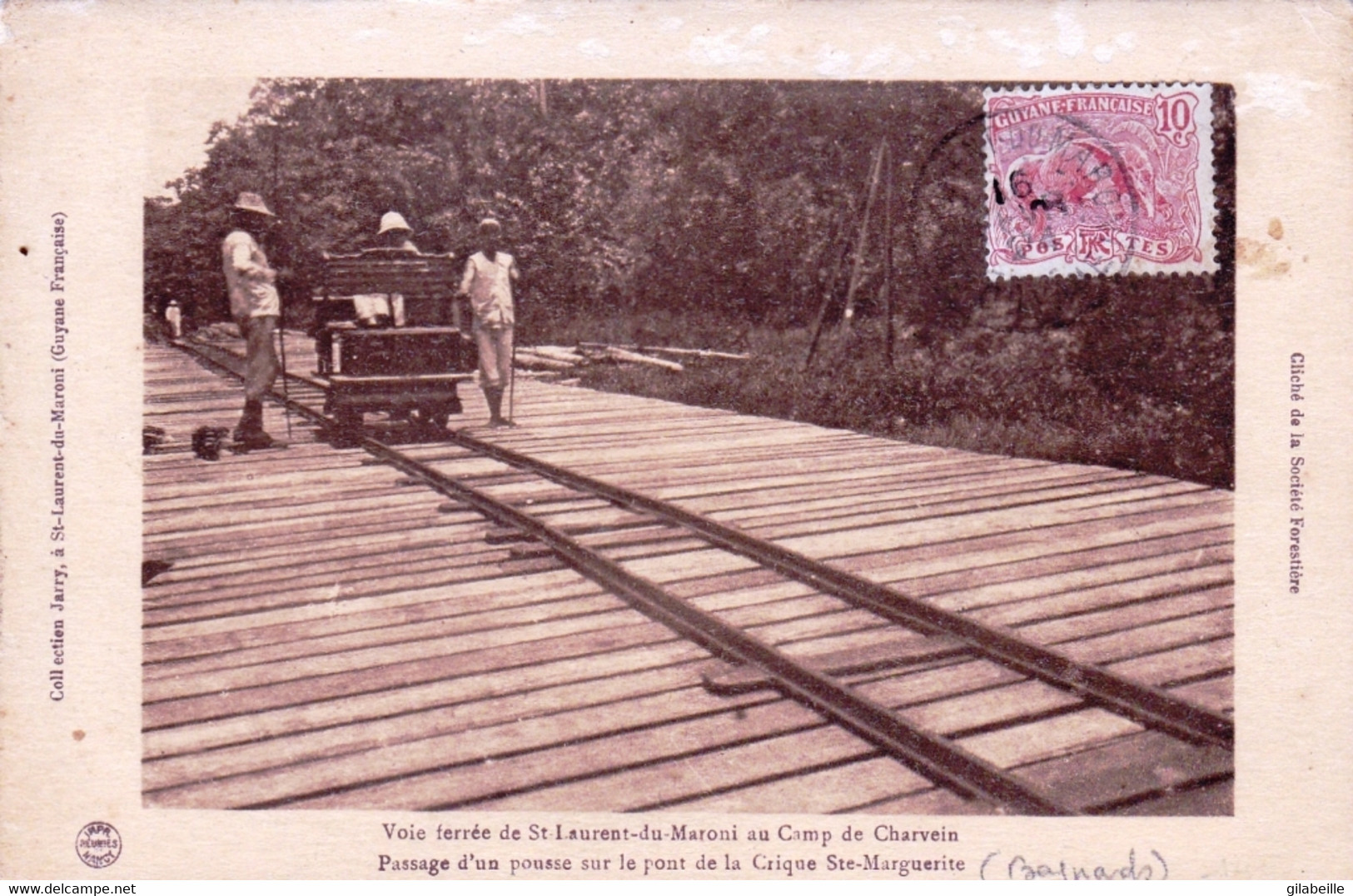
The railway line to Charvein near Crique Ste-Marguerite

A 22 kilometre Decauville railway was constructed between Saint-Laurent-du-Maroni and Charvein to provide access to the sawmill, and the prison camp.

In 1925, the camp for incorrigibles closed, and Charvein was turned into an agricultural prison camp. On 17 June 1938, the prison colony closed altogether.

== Surinamese refugees ==
The Surinamese Interior War, which was fought between 1986 and 1992, resulted in refugees crossing the border between Suriname and French Guiana. In 1989, a camp was built near the village to house the refugees. Originally the camp was home to 1,063 refugees. The refugee camp was dismantled in 1992.

== Current situation ==
Charvein is mainly inhabited by former Surinamese refugees. The village is located on the road from Saint-Laurent-du-Maroni to Mana, and the starting point of the road to Acarouany and Javouhey. Along the road, little shops and stalls have been constructed. In 2012, the post office reopened after protests from the villagers, and a police station was constructed in the village.

On 12 November 2020, the main road was blocked in protest. The children of the village have to use the bus to school, and pay in advance, however due to personnel shortage and the COVID-19 pandemic, the bus was cancelled altogether. The mayor has given into the demands, the bus service will restored, and the people will be reimbursed.

== Geography ==
=== Climate ===
Charvein has a tropical rainforest climate (Köppen climate classification Af). The average annual temperature in Charvein is 26.7 °C (80.1 °F). The average annual rainfall is 2,837.8 mm (111.72 in) with May as the wettest month. The temperatures are highest on average in October, at around 27.8 °C (82.0 °F), and lowest in January, at around 25.7 °C (78.3 °F). The highest temperature ever recorded in Charvein was 38.8 °C (101.8 °F) on 15 October 2023; the coldest temperature ever recorded was 16.9 °C (62.4 °F) on 1 January 2018.

Climate data for Charvein (1991–2020 averages, extremes 1978−present)
Month	Jan	Feb	Mar	Apr	May	Jun	Jul	Aug	Sep	Oct	Nov	Dec	Year
Record high °C (°F)	33.9 (93.0)	33.8 (92.8)	35.1 (95.2)	35.2 (95.4)	34.5 (94.1)	35.0 (95.0)	35.4 (95.7)	37.5 (99.5)	38.3 (100.9)	38.8 (101.8)	37.2 (99.0)	35.5 (95.9)	38.8 (101.8)
Mean daily maximum °C (°F)	29.8 (85.6)	29.7 (85.5)	30.4 (86.7)	30.5 (86.9)	30.4 (86.7)	31.1 (88.0)	32.0 (89.6)	32.9 (91.2)	33.7 (92.7)	33.9 (93.0)	32.5 (90.5)	30.6 (87.1)	31.5 (88.7)
Daily mean °C (°F)	25.7 (78.3)	25.8 (78.4)	26.1 (79.0)	26.5 (79.7)	26.6 (79.9)	26.6 (79.9)	26.8 (80.2)	27.3 (81.1)	27.6 (81.7)	27.8 (82.0)	27.1 (80.8)	26.3 (79.3)	26.7 (80.1)
Mean daily minimum °C (°F)	21.7 (71.1)	21.8 (71.2)	21.9 (71.4)	22.4 (72.3)	22.7 (72.9)	22.2 (72.0)	21.6 (70.9)	21.7 (71.1)	21.6 (70.9)	21.7 (71.1)	21.8 (71.2)	21.9 (71.4)	21.9 (71.4)
Record low °C (°F)	16.9 (62.4)	17.2 (63.0)	17.0 (62.6)	18.2 (64.8)	18.8 (65.8)	18.5 (65.3)	19.3 (66.7)	18.8 (65.8)	18.9 (66.0)	18.9 (66.0)	17.7 (63.9)	17.9 (64.2)	16.9 (62.4)
Average precipitation mm (inches)	264.9 (10.43)	240.5 (9.47)	209.1 (8.23)	347.4 (13.68)	446.8 (17.59)	352.0 (13.86)	248.7 (9.79)	165.5 (6.52)	81.9 (3.22)	68.3 (2.69)	140.6 (5.54)	272.1 (10.71)	2,837.8 (111.72)
Average precipitation days (≥ 1.0 mm)	18.3	15.7	15.4	18.3	23.1	22.3	19.1	13.6	6.8	7.2	13.1	19.3	192.2
Source: Météo-France
