= La Charbonnière =

La Charbonnière Sabonye
- Neighbourhood
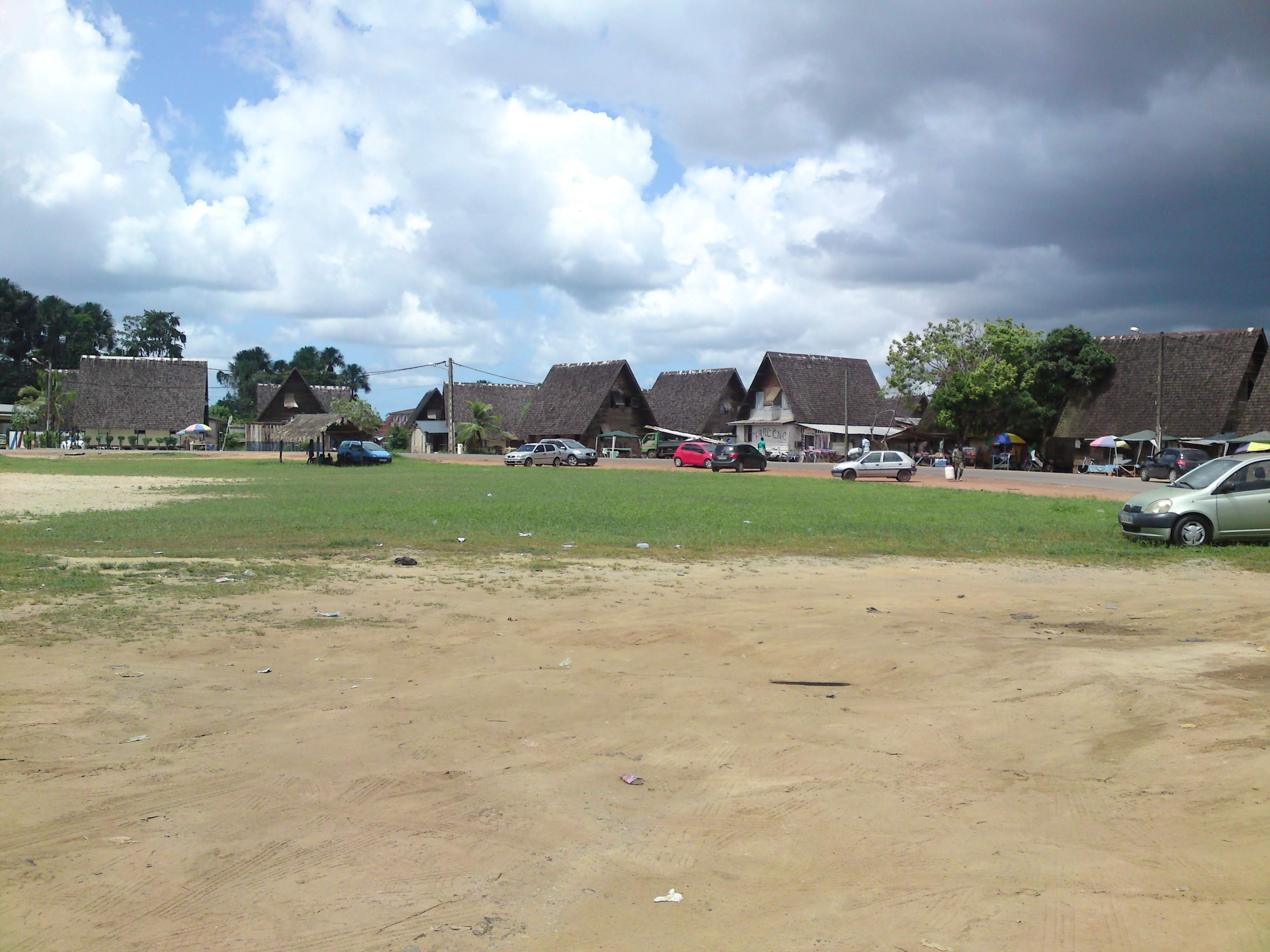

- Location in French Guiana
- Coordinates: 5.49063°N 54.03737°W
- Country: France
- Overseas region: French Guiana
- City: Saint-Laurent-du-Maroni

La Charbonnière (French pronunciation: [la ʃaʁbɔnjɛʁ]; Sranan Tongo: Sabonye) is a neighbourhood of Saint-Laurent-du-Maroni, French Guiana. The neighbourhood is mainly populated by Maroons. La Charbonnière was created in 1989 to house Surinamese refugees, and to resettle the inhabitants of the shanty towns. It is located between the ferry to Albina and the village of Balaté.

== Overview ==
In 1950, Maroons of the Aluku tribe settled on the banks of the Maroni River near Saint-Laurent-du-Maroni. The first village was called Pikin Agoodé (Little Agoodé) after their village of origin.

The Surinamese Interior War, which was fought between 1986 and 1992, resulted in refugees crossing the border between Suriname and French Guiana. In 1989, a refugee camp was built in La Charbonnière to house the refugees. Originally the camp was home to 1,144 people.

In 1989, construction started on a new neighbourhood to house both the refugees, and the inhabitants of the shanty towns. During the 1990s, the settlements on the river bank were demolished. The neighbourhood consists of triangular houses modelled after the huts inhabited by the Maroons. The relocation to public housing had limited success, because later new shanty towns emerged on the outskirts of the city. In 2020, INSEE counted six shanty towns with a maximum population estimate of 9,000 people.

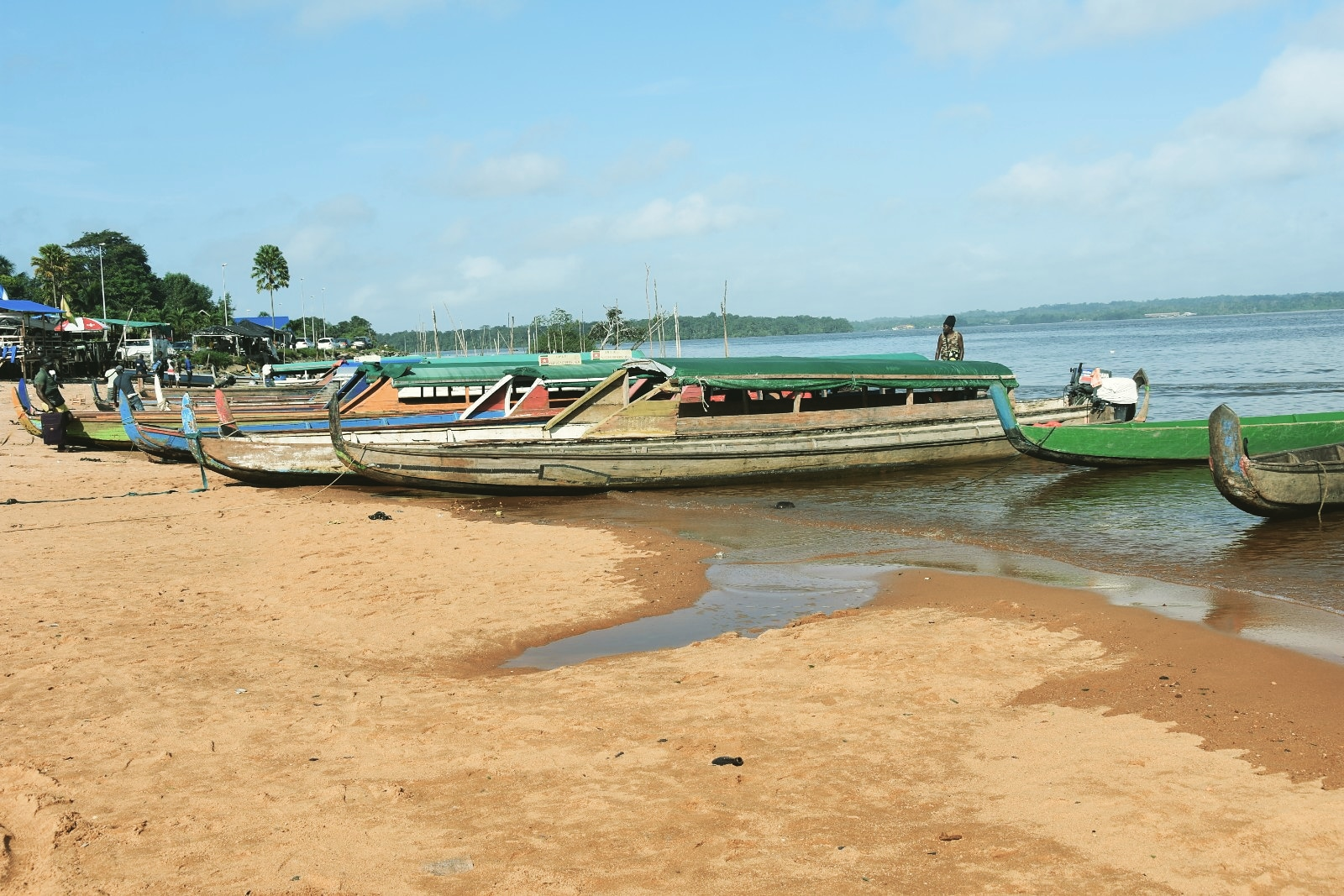
Pirogues on the beach of la Charbonnière.

La Charbonnière has become a tourist attraction, and is one of the busiest parts of the city. Because French Guiana is part of France, and the European Union, the prices for consumer goods are significantly higher than in Suriname. One of the attractions of La Charbonnière is the sale of smuggled goods at lower prices. On 20 April 2020, the illegally constructed stalls and shops were removed, because they violated COVID-19 regulations.

== Bibliography ==
- Charbonnière (2007). "Laisez-vous conter La Charbonnière" (in French and Sranan Tongo). Ville de Saint-Laurent du Maroni. Archived from the original on 2023-04-05.
