= Espérance, French Guiana =

Espérance Wilamila
- Village
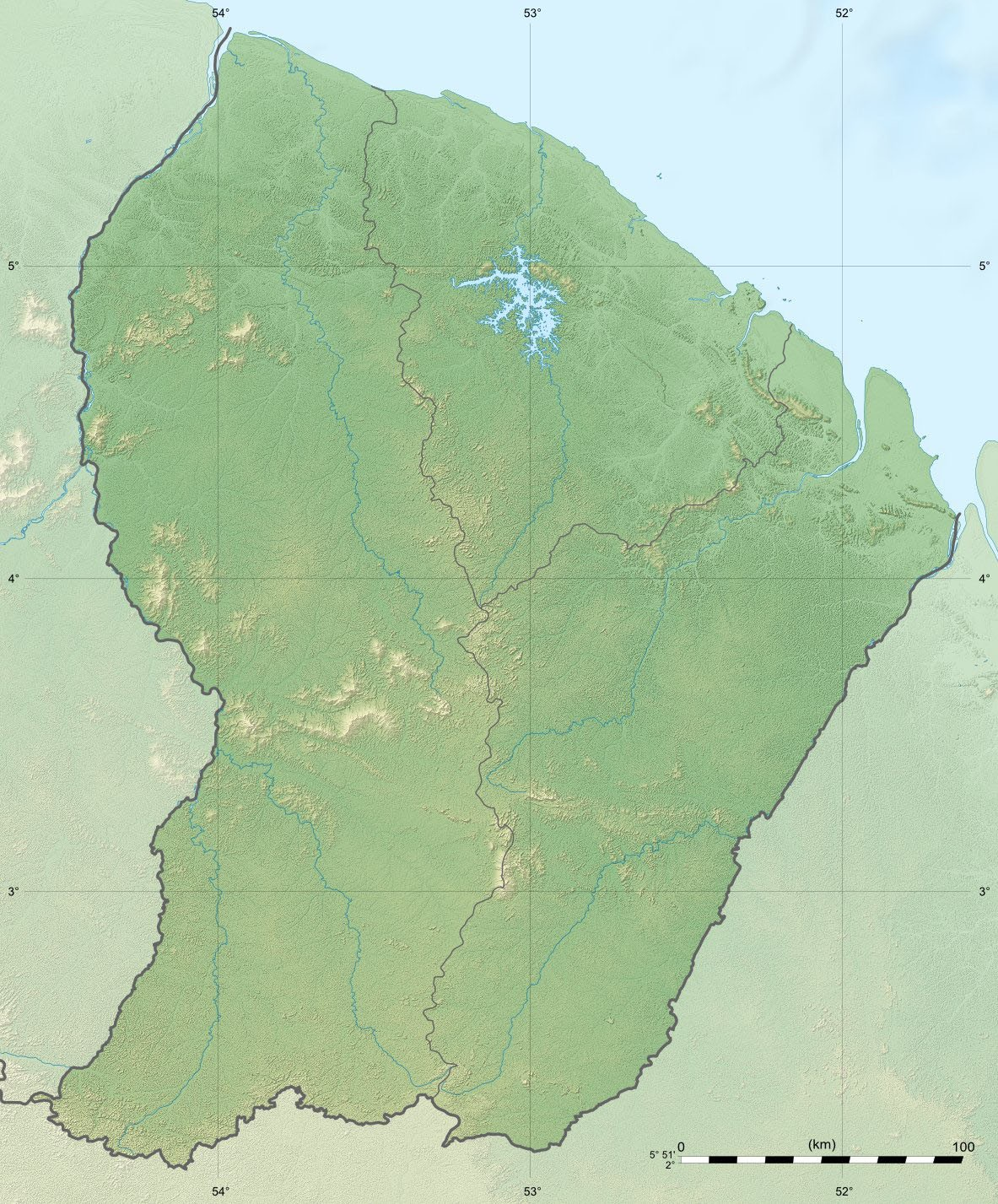
- Location in French Guiana
- Coordinates: 5.43194°N 54.05169°W
- Country: France
- Overseas region: French Guiana
- Arrondissement: Saint-Laurent-du-Maroni
- Commune: Saint-Laurent-du-Maroni

Government
  - Yopoto: Claire-Suzanne Poulin
- Time zone: UTC−03:00 (GFT)

Espérance (French pronunciation: [ɛspeʁɑ̃s]; Kalina: Wilamila) is a village of Kalina Amerindians in the commune of Saint-Laurent-du-Maroni. The village is located about 12 kilometres south of Saint-Laurent-du-Maroni on the road to Saint-Jean-du-Maroni.

== Overview ==
About 200 Kalinas used to live on Île Portal, an island in the Maroni River. The island on which they lived was bought by SCI de Provence. In 1981, they were removed from the island and resettled in Espérance.

Espérance has a school. The village can be accessed by an unpaved road. Two companies are located near the village, and their heavy trucks make the road impassable. In 2006, the main road to Saint-Jean-du-Maroni was blocked by the villagers. In 2020, Claire-Suzanne Poulin was elected Yopoto (village chief). Poulin aims to open a heritage school in the village where the Kalina language and traditions are taught.
