= Tour of Guiana =

Race details
- Date: August
- Region: French Guiana and nearby countries
- Local name(s): Le Tour du Littoral (French)
- Nickname(s): La Grande Boucle Guyanaise (French)
- Discipline: Road race
- Type: Stage race
- Organiser: Comité Régional de Cyclisme de la Guyane & French Cycling Federation
- Race director: Jean-Yves Thiver

History
- First edition: 1960; 65 years ago
- Editions: 29 (2019)
- Most recent: Jean-Claude Uwizeye (FRA)

The Tour of Guiana (French: Tour de Guyane), formerly known as "Le Tour du Littoral", is an annual multiple stage bicycle race primarily held in Guiana every year, while also occasionally making passes through nearby countries. It takes place in nine stages, the tour connects the main cities of the department : Cayenne, Kourou, Saint-Laurent-du-Maroni.

The tour has become international since 1978, it is gaining in importance and popularity over the editions, its length is lengthened. Participation expanded from a mainly Guianan peloton in the first editions to editions with more than 10 different nationalities.
