= Île Portal =

- Island
- Location in French Guiana
- Coordinates: 5.4056°N 54.1084°W
- Country: France
- Overseas region: French Guiana
- Arrondissement: Saint-Laurent-du-Maroni
- Commune: Saint-Laurent-du-Maroni

Area
  - Total: 27 km^{2} (10 sq mi)

Population (2011)
  - Total: 124
  - Density: 4.6/km^{2} (12/sq mi)

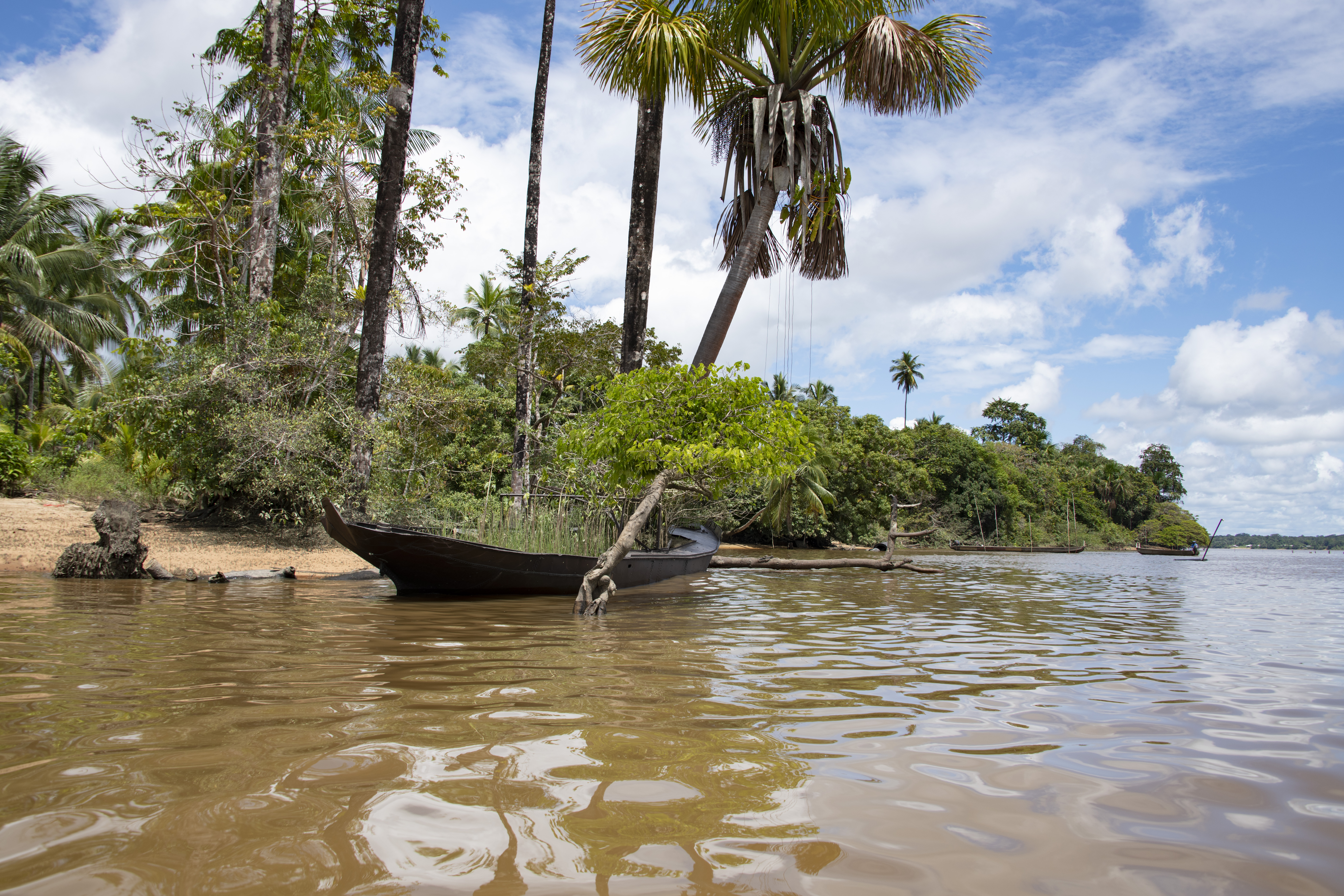

Île Portal (French pronunciation: [il pɔʁtal]) is an island in the Maroni River in the commune of Saint-Laurent-du-Maroni, French Guiana. The island measures 27 km^{2}

== History ==
In 1852, Constant Bar started a plantation on the island to produce coffee, sugar and wood. The workforce consisted of African and East-Indian immigrants, and French convicts from the penal colony. In 1878, the island was visited by the explorer Jules Crevaux who noted that four brothers were operating the plantation. In the early 20th century, the island was bought by Talon who started a distillery on the island. In 1964, the distillery and the buildings burnt down in a fire.

== Indigenous inhabitants ==
About 200 Kalina Amerindians used to live on the island. In the late 1970s, the island was bought by SCI de Provence, a real estate company, who wanted the Amerindians off their land. In 1981, they were told to leave the island, and resettle in Espérance.

In 1983, the Prefecture of French Guiana refused to forcibly remove the remaining population of the island. SCI de Provence has sued the State for damages. In 2011, there were still 124 people living on the island. As of 2018, there are little camps along the river. There is no school on the island, and the children have to take a pirogue to the mainland followed by a bus to Saint-Laurent-du-Maroni. As of 2019, SCI de Provence is still in litigation.
