= Saint-Laurent-du-Maroni =

Subprefecture and commune in French Guiana, France

Saint-Laurent-du-Maroni Sen-Laurent-di-Maronni (Guianese Creole French) Soolan (Eastern Maroon Creole)
- Subprefecture and commune
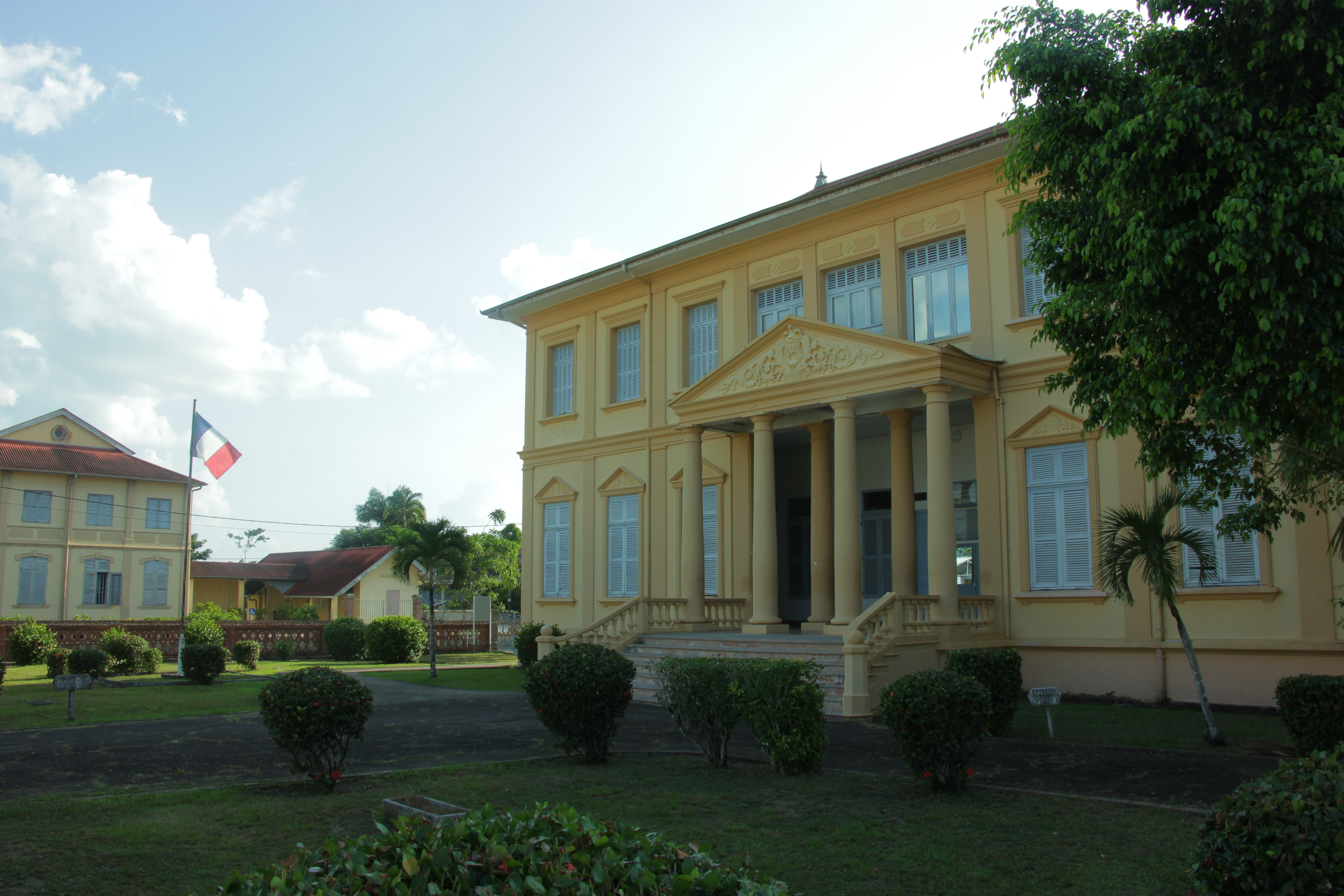
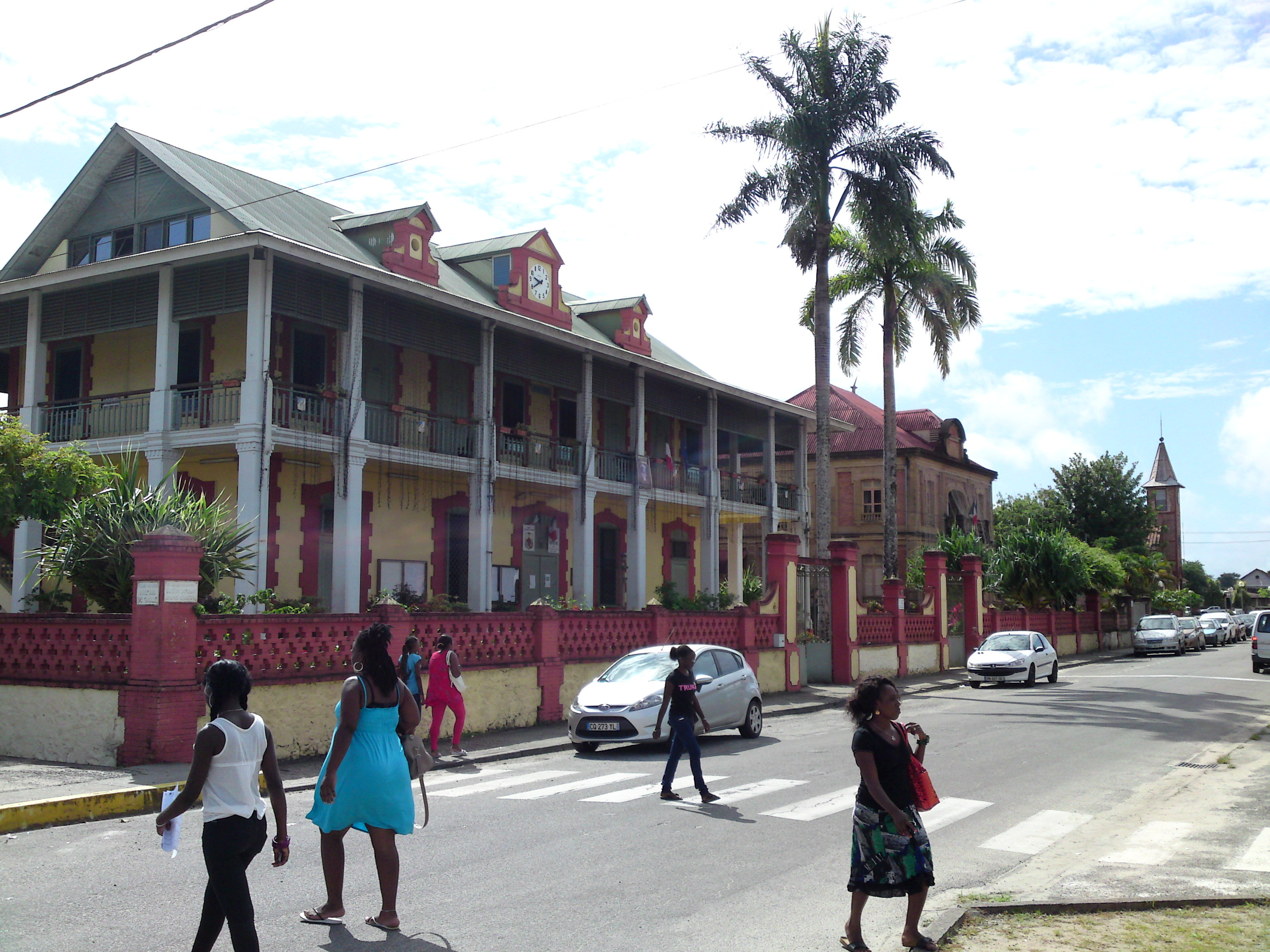
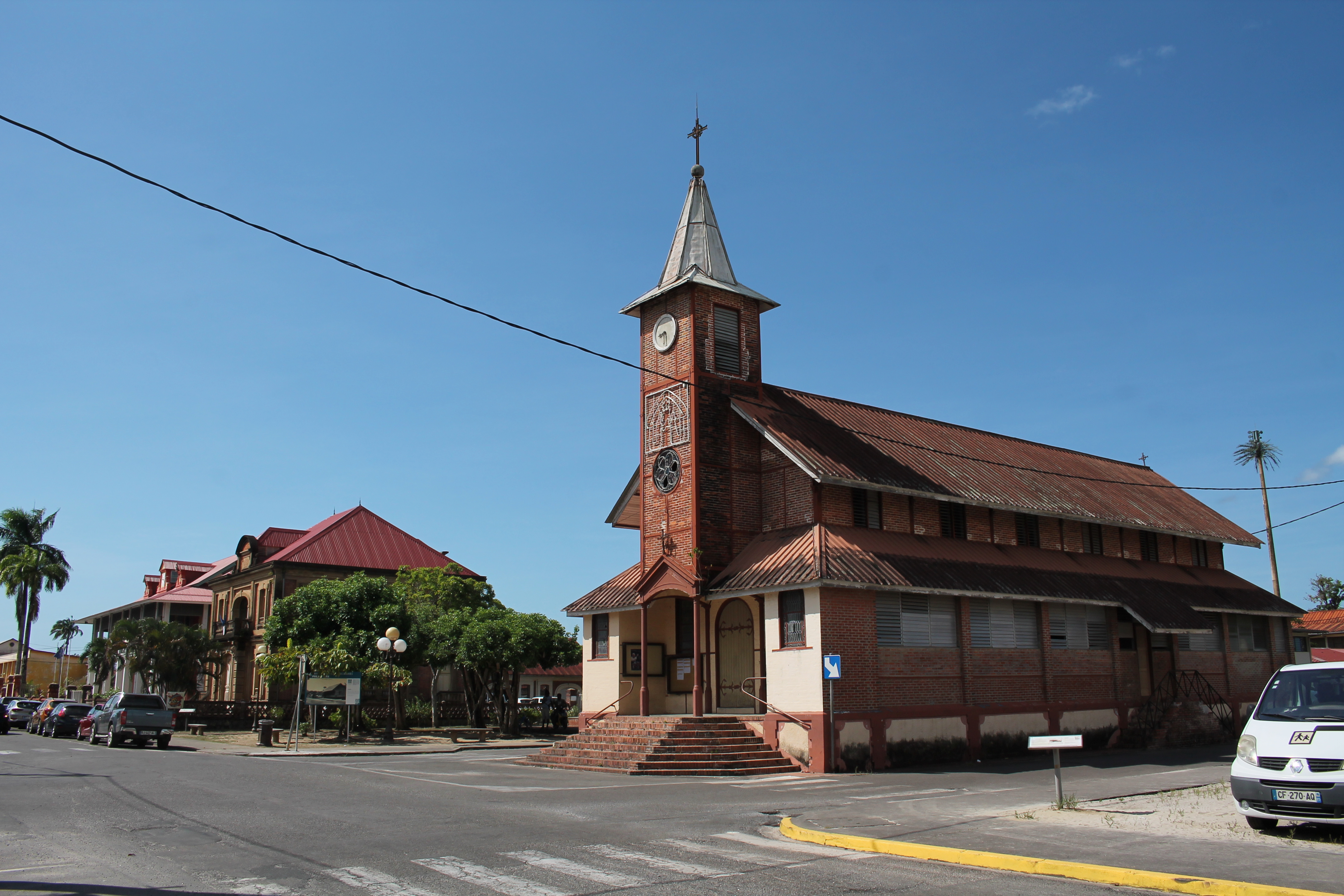
- From top to bottom: subprefecture building, the Hôtel de Ville, main Catholic church of Saint-Laurent-du-Maroni

- Coat of arms

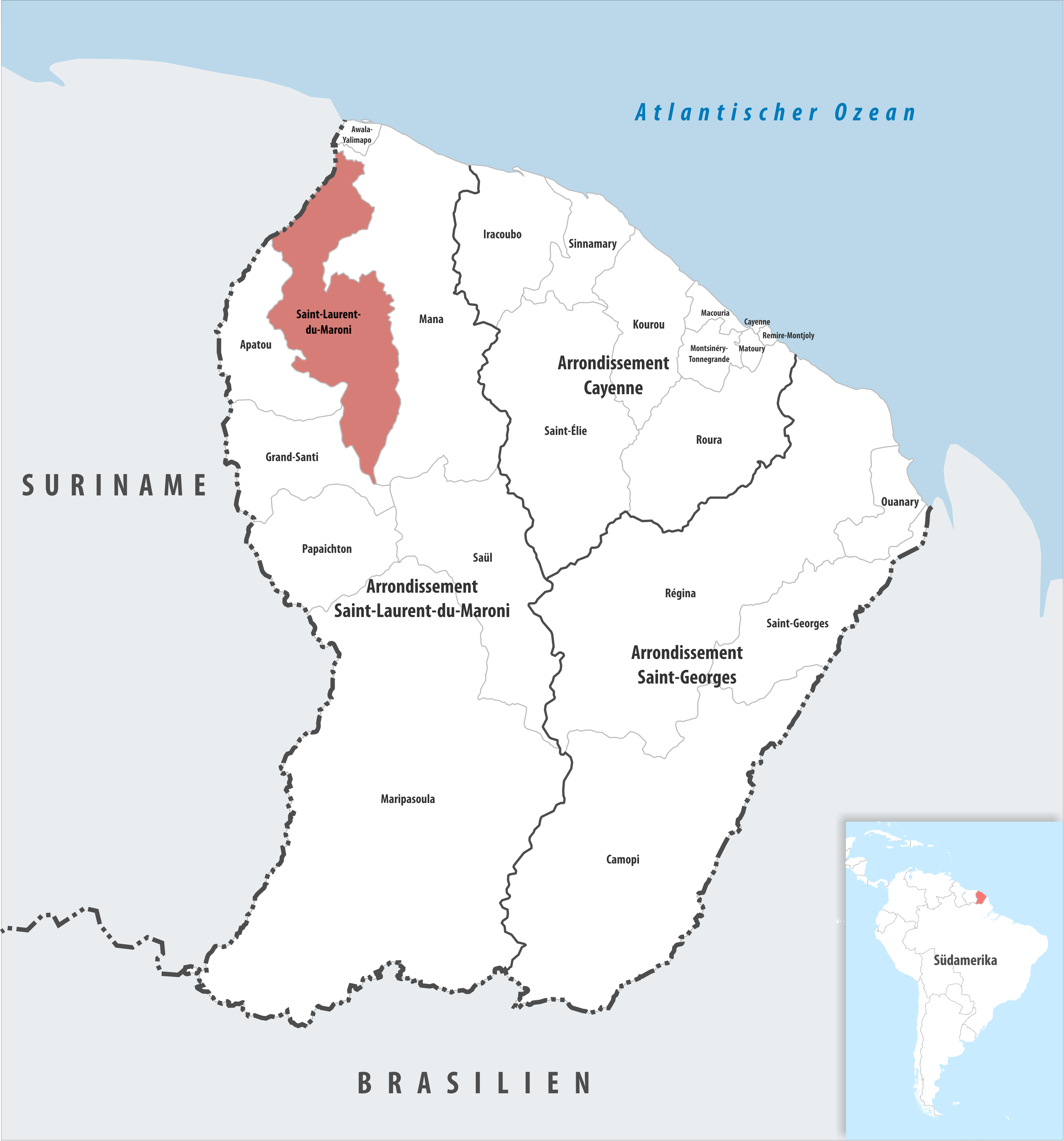
- Location of the commune (in red) within French Guiana
- Location of Saint-Laurent-du-Maroni
- Coordinates: 5°29′58″N 54°01′52″W
- Country: France
- Overseas region and department: French Guiana
- Arrondissement: Saint-Laurent-du-Maroni
- Intercommunality: Ouest Guyanais

Government
  - Mayor (2020–2026): Lénaïck Adam (DVD)
- Area^{1}: 4,830 km^{2} (1,860 sq mi)
- Population (2023): 54,429
  - Density: 11.3/km^{2} (29.2/sq mi)
- Time zone: UTC−03:00
- INSEE/Postal code: 97311 /97320
- ^{1} French Land Register data, which excludes lakes, ponds, glaciers > 1 km^{2} (0.386 sq mi or 247 acres) and river estuaries.

Saint-Laurent-du-Maroni (French pronunciation: [sɛ̃ loʁɑ̃ dy maʁɔni], [sɛ̃ lɔʁɑ̃-], lit. 'Saint-Laurent of the Maroni'; French Guianese Creole: Sen-Laurent-di-Maronni; Eastern Maroon Creole: Soolan) is a commune of French Guiana, an overseas region and department of France located in South America. Saint-Laurent-du-Maroni is one of the three sub-prefectures of French Guiana and the seat of the Arrondissement of Saint-Laurent-du-Maroni. It is the second most populous city of French Guiana, with 54,429 inhabitants at the January 2023 census.

Saint-Laurent-du-Maroni was the site of a penal colony from 1858 to 1946. In 2025 France announced a plan to open a new high-security prison there.

== History ==
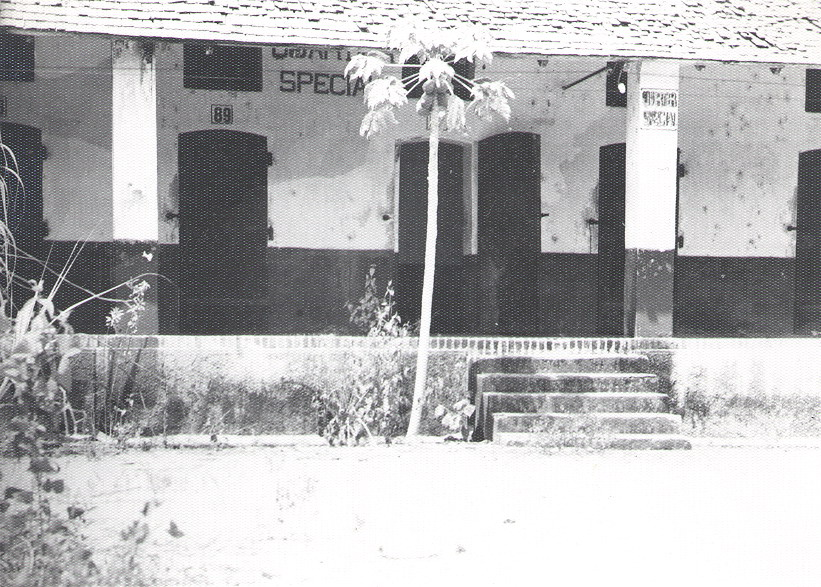
"Quartier Spécial" - Condemned men's block, 1954 (the guillotine stood at the spot where the photographer took the photo)

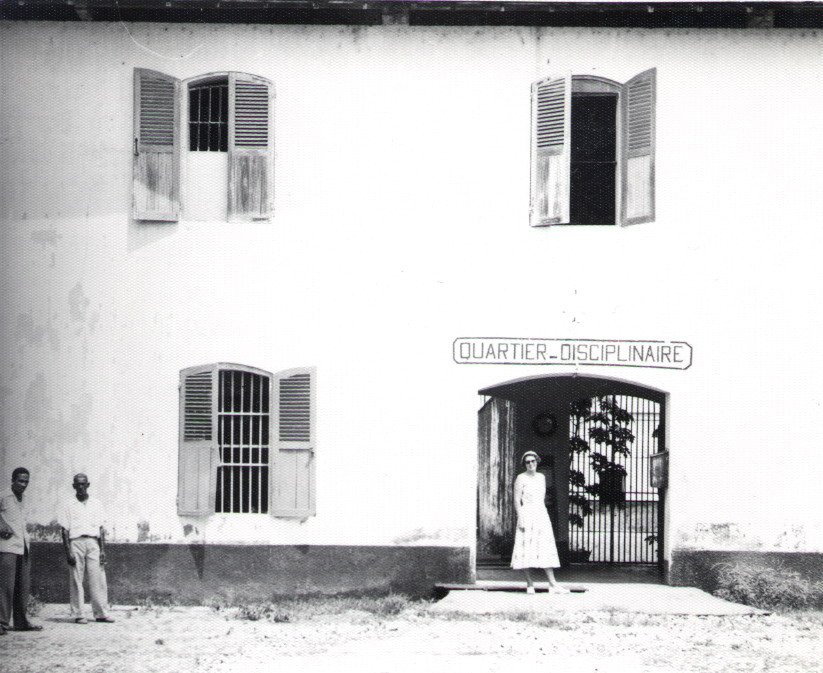
"Quartier - Disciplinaire", St. Laurent. 1954

Founded in 1858 by Auguste Baudin, it was formerly the arrival point for prisoners, who arrived at the Camp de la Transportation.

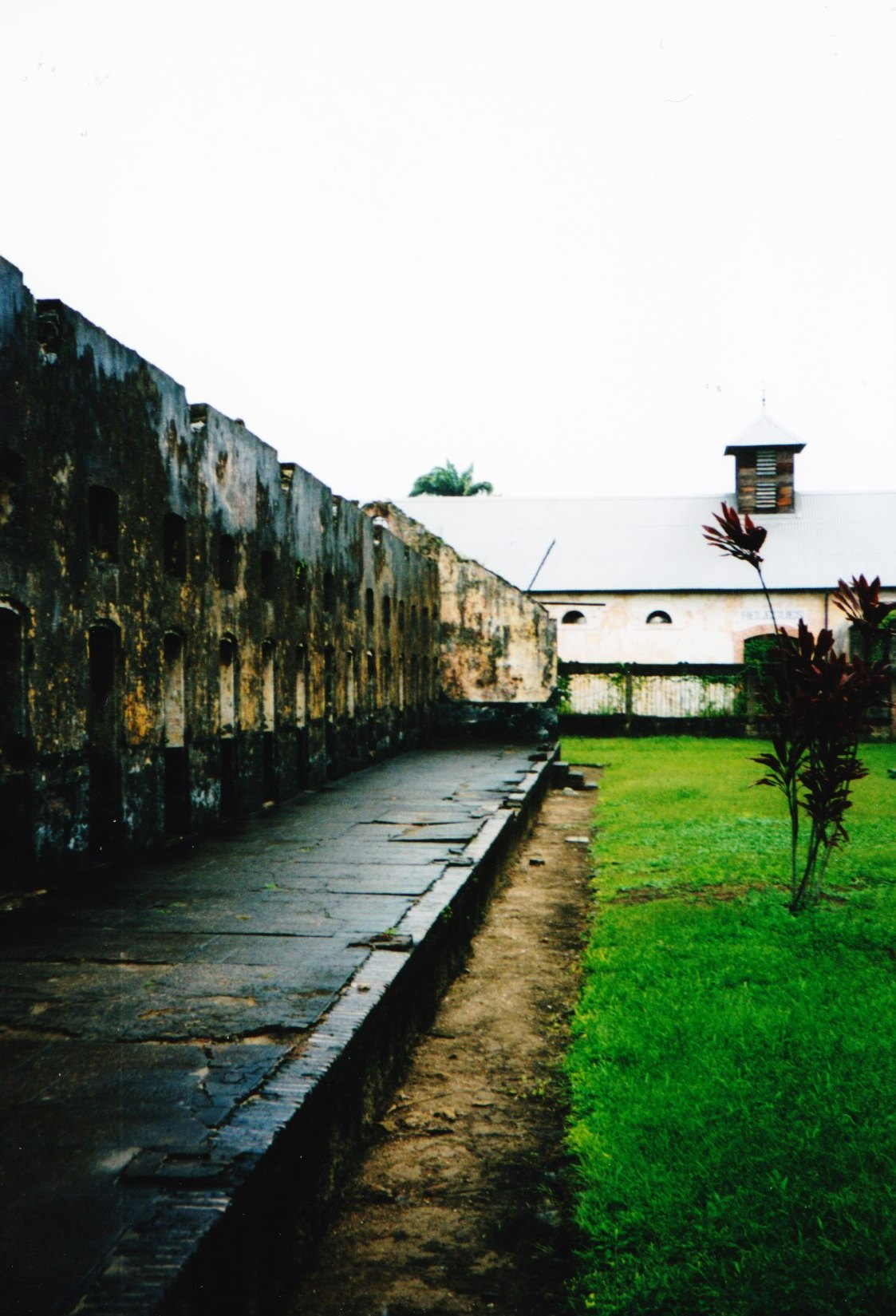
View inside the prison of Saint-Laurent.

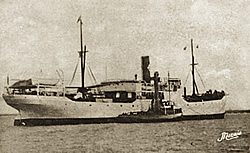
The Martinière, a prison ship used for the deportation from France to French Guiana

The town was near an Amerindian settlement called Kamalakuli named after their chief. On 15 September 1880, the town became the capital city of a special prison commune; the mayor was the Director of the Penitentiary Administration. The Hôtel de Ville was completed in 1907.

When Gaston Monnerville was elected Deputy in 1932, he tried to close the prison complex. On 17 June 1938, the prison was repealed, but the final closure did not come until 1946. On 9 November 1949, Saint-Laurent-du-Maroni became a regular commune.

In 2025 France announced a plan to open a new high-security prison there at a cost estimated at €400m, possibly in 2028, following several incidents involving high-security prisons in mainland France.

In June 2025, an agreement for the transfer of 91 hectares of state-owned land was signed between the French State and the city of Saint-Laurent-du-Maroni. The French government transferred more than 250,000 hectares to the French Guiana communities, enabling the creation of public facilities, housing, and a new business park.

== Geography ==
Saint-Laurent-du-Maroni is a border town in north-west French Guiana. It is located on the Maroni River (in Dutch: Marowijne), opposite the town of Albina in Suriname which can be reached by ferry or pirogue. It does not, therefore, have an Atlantic coast; this may have motivated the choice of the town's location, as the penal authorities wanted to prevent the escape of prisoners from the Prison of St-Laurent-du-Maroni by a sea route.

The ethnic composition of the town is, as everywhere in French Guiana, diverse: Maroons are today the largest ethnic group, followed by Creoles, Amerindians, Haitians, métropolitains and Brazilians.

Maroons will mostly be found in the neighbourhoods called la Charbonnière (Djukas, Saramakas and Paramaccans), les Vampires and les Sables Blancs. Amerindians are located in a few villages on the outskirts of town: Balaté (Arawaks), Paddock, Prospérité, Terre Rouge, Espérance, Village Pierre (Kalinas).

== Demographics ==
=== Historical population ===
Historical population Saint-Laurent-du-Maroni

Year	Pop.	±% p.a.
1954	3,172	—
1961	3,019	−0.68%
1967	5,031	+8.85%
1974	5,055	+0.07%
1982	6,971	+4.44%
1990	13,616	+8.71%

Year	Pop.	±% p.a.
1999	19,211	+3.91%
2007	34,149	+7.64%
2012	40,597	+3.52%
2017	42,612	+0.97%
2023	54,429	+4.16%

Source: SPLAF, INSEE, Brasseur

=== Migrations ===
The places of birth of the 43,600 residents in the commune of Saint-Laurent-du-Maroni at the 2015 census were the following:

- 64.1% were born in French Guiana
- 5.3% in Metropolitan France
- 0.9% in Martinique
- 0.5% in Guadeloupe
- 0.2% in other parts of Overseas France
- 29.0% in foreign countries (notably Suriname, followed by Brazil and to a lesser extent Haiti); among these, 28.4% were immigrants and 0.7% were children of French citizens born abroad

These were the countries of birth of the immigrants living in the commune of Saint-Laurent-du-Maroni at the 2009 census:

- born in Suriname: 7,631
- born in Brazil: 3,105
- born in Haiti: 1,199
- born in Guyana: 327
- born in other countries: 530

== Environment ==
This river town was the headquarters of an important association for the protection of the environment, "Le pou d'agouti", named after an annoying local mite with an itchy bite, which strove for the protection of local and regional fauna and flora from 1990 to 2003.

The town is the point of departure for several ecotourism circuits, most notably journeys upriver to explore the many creeks as well as the Amazonian rainforest; tourists can spend a night in the jungle in huts or tents. Another possibility is visiting the Voltaire Falls, situated 70 km (43 mi) upriver.

Industrial activities, slowly increasing urban density and its accompanying shanty towns as well as poaching have damaged the surrounding area, but on 23 May 2009 a species of Caecilian hitherto unknown to man was discovered in town.

== Transport ==
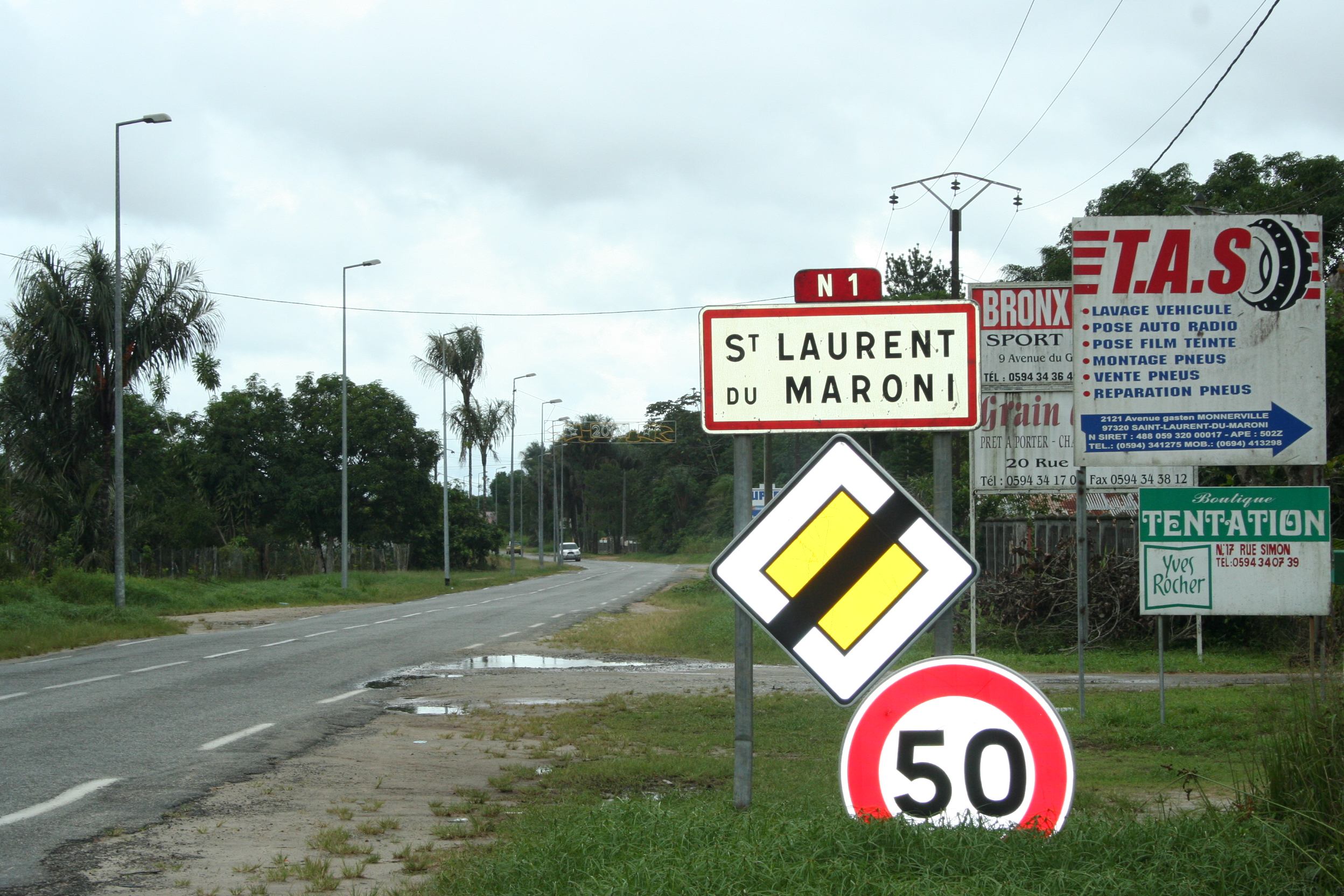
Saint-Laurent-du-Maroni (town enterence) on Route National 1 (RN1)

Between 1890 and 1897, a 16 kilometre Decauville railway was constructed between Saint-Laurent-du Maroni and Saint-Jean-du-Maroni. Another 22 kilometre railway was built to the sawmill at Charvein. The railways were abandoned after the penal camps closed.

Saint-Laurent-du-Maroni can be accessed chiefly by road, the Route Nationale 1, from Cayenne. A new port was recently built on the Maroni, but currently lacks proper wharf infrastructure and sufficient river depth. The Saint-Maurice airfield was decommissioned in 1946, but is used for sports. The Saint-Jean road links Saint-Laurent to Saint-Jean-du-Maroni and the military base there.

In 2010, Route Nationale opened connecting Saint-Laurent-du-Maroni starting from the Plateau des Mines to Apatou. The road was opened with the Tour of Guiana. The road is scheduled to be extended to Maripasoula. Construction work on the section between Apatou and Papaïchton is planned to commence in 2021.

The town is also an important port of departure for those going inland via pirogue or to Albina in Suriname by ferry or pirogue.

The town's Saint-Laurent-du-Maroni Airport is served by Air Guyane Express.

== Economy ==
The sugarcane fields near town produce "La Belle Cabresse" rum (as well as the less well-known "La Cayennaise" and "Cœur de Chauffe") for the Saint Maurice rum company. The rum is 50 to 55% alcohol by volume, (100 to 110 proof) and of high quality.

On the road to Saint-Jean-du-Maroni (about 17 km (11 mi) south of St-Laurent, home of the former penal Camp de la Rélégation), one can find many small shops owned by Saramakas selling the woodwork for which they are famous - especially chairs and tables. There is also a village of Maroon artisans on the road to Javouhey.

Two military units are stationed at St-Jean's Camp Némo: the Groupement du service militaire adapté (GSMA), which is part of the Ministry of Overseas France and is in charge of professional job reinsertion in the west of French Guiana; and the Maroni detachment of the 9th Marine Infantry Regiment whose job it is to patrol the river border and the jungles of the west of the département.In 2008, the two units has merged into the Regiment of the Adapted Military Service (RSMA).

== Sights ==
Originally built by, and for, the French department of corrections or Administration Pénitentiaire, many old official buildings in Saint-Laurent-du-Maroni bear a distinctive architectural style, a unique mix of colonial style and penitentiary architecture. Bricks made from the local red clay were used by the convicts, who provided a free and never-ending workforce, to build a whole official and administrative district, starting with the main jailhouse itself, the Camp de la Transportation.

Some of the main buildings in the old administrative district, locally called Le Petit Paris for its alleged reminiscence of a 19th-century French architecture:

- Le Camp de la Transportation (guided tours available, famous for Henri 'Papillon' Charrière's cell) and the adjacent Office du Tourisme;
- La Résidence du Gouverneur du bagne, today's residence of the sous-préfet, and formerly the governor's residence;
- Le Tribunal maritime, today's sous-préfecture;
- La Mairie (city hall) and the former bank;
- St. Lawrence Church;
- Le Trésor public;
- L'Hôtel La Tentiaire;
- La caserne Joffre (the Gendarmerie HQ);
- André-Bouron Hospital (It was in use until September 2018).

Most of these buildings are located on Avenue De Gaulle, Avenue Lieutenant-Colonel Tourtet and the Boulevard Mallouet. After the jailhouse was closed and the penal authority left in the early 1950s, these buildings suffered from lack of maintenance and interest, and were much damaged due to the harsh weather conditions in western French Guiana. Close to a state of total ruin, they underwent a major restoration in the early 80s, after the city council and French Minister of Culture realized that the old penitentiary and administrative district was of high cultural and historical interest. It soon became a major tourist attraction, with the Camp de la Transportation its star.

Other notable sights from the penitentiary years include Saint-Jean-du-Maroni, formerly the Camp de la Relégation and today's main military HQ for western French Guiana. There is also a small island in the middle of the Maroni River which used to house the prisoners affected with leprosy. Papillon wrote about hiding there during one of his daring escapes.

Notable sights not related to the prisons:

- La Charbonnière: Maroon village founded by refugees from Suriname's civil war.

There are many hotels in Saint-Laurent-du-Maroni, including the Auberge Bois Diable, Chez Julienne, Hôtel la Tentiaire, Le Relais des 3 Lacs and Star Hôtel.

== Climate ==
Saint-Laurent-du-Maroni features an equatorial climate that is a tropical rainforest climate (Köppen Af) more subject to the Intertropical Convergence Zone than the trade winds and with no cyclones. The temperatures are uniform throughout the year, with the average annual low being around 24 °C (75 °F) and the average annual high being around 29 °C (84 °F), although September and October, the driest two months, have a slightly higher average high at 31 °C (88 °F). The town receives an abundant amount of rain throughout the year, classifying it as a tropical rainforest climate as all months have at least 100 mm (3.9 in) of rain per month, unlike the south and east of French Guiana where the months of September and October are typically drier than this. On 27 September 2016, Saint-Laurent-du-Maroni recorded a temperature of 38.0 °C (100.4 °F), which is the highest temperature to have ever been recorded in the French Guiana.

Climate data for Saint-Laurent-du-Maroni
Month	Jan	Feb	Mar	Apr	May	Jun	Jul	Aug	Sep	Oct	Nov	Dec	Year
Mean daily maximum °C (°F)	28 (82)	28 (82)	28 (83)	28 (83)	28 (83)	28 (83)	29 (84)	30 (86)	31 (87)	31 (87)	29 (85)	28 (83)	29 (84)
Mean daily minimum °C (°F)	24 (75)	24 (75)	24 (76)	24 (76)	24 (76)	24 (75)	24 (75)	24 (76)	24 (76)	24 (76)	24 (75)	24 (75)	24 (75)
Average rainfall mm (inches)	260 (10.3)	180 (7.1)	190 (7.6)	240 (9.5)	350 (13.6)	330 (13)	250 (9.7)	170 (6.8)	110 (4.5)	100 (4)	160 (6.3)	250 (9.7)	2,590 (102.1)
Source: Weatherbase

== Notable people ==
- Lénaïck Adam (1992), politician.
- Léon Bertrand (1951), politician and mayor.
- Raoul Diagne (1910–2002), footballer.
- Sonia Francius (born 1979), civil servant.
- Oriane Jean-François (2001), footballer.
- Florian Jozefzoon (1991), footballer.
- Stéphane Martine (1978), footballer.
- Raymond Tarcy (1936–2019), politician and senator.

== References in popular culture ==
Somerset Maugham wrote stories set in St. Laurent de Maroni at the time of the French penal settlement of Guiana. In his short story "A Man with a Conscience" Maugham describes the town:

"St Laurent de Maroni is a pretty little place. It is neat and clean. It has an Hotel de Ville and a Palais de Justice of which many a town in France would be proud. The streets are wide, and the fine trees that border them give a grateful shade. The houses look as though they had just had a coat of paint. Many of them nestle in little gardens, and in the gardens are palm trees and flame of the forest; cannas flaunt their bright colours and crotons their variety; the bougainvilleas, purple or red, riot profusely, and the elegant hibiscus offers its gorgeous flowers with a negligence that seems almost affected. St Laurent de Maroni is the centre of the French penal settlement of Guiana, and a hundred yards from the quay at which you land is the great gateway of the prison camp. These pretty little houses in their tropical gardens are the residence of the prison officials, and if the streets are neat and clean it is because there is no lack of convicts to keep them so."

Maugham's short story "An Official Position" is also set in Saint-Laurent-du-Maroni. Both stories first appeared in book form in the collection The Mixture as Before (1940). In 1936 Maugham visited the place himself; his notes, including material that was used in both stories, was later published in A Writer's Notebook (1949). This is how he described the executions in his notes:

When a man is sentenced to death the sentence has to be confirmed by the minister in Paris. No execution takes place on Sunday. If two or more are to be guillotined at the same time the least guilty is executed first so that he should not suffer the added horror of seeing his mates die. The convict does not know that he will be executed till the warder comes in with the words: Have courage, etc. When there are executions the other convicts are depressed and nervous, and they go about their work sullen and silent.

When the head has fallen the executioner takes it up by the ears and shows it to the bystanders, saying: Au nom du people francais justice est faite. At the side of the guillotine is a large wicker basket covered with some black material and into this the body is put. The knife falls with lightning speed and the blood spurts over the executioner. He is given a set of new clothes after each execution.

== Villages ==
- Balaté, an Lokono village near Saint-Laurent-du-Maroni
- Espérance, a Kalina village near Saint-Laurent-du-Maroni
- Île Portal, an island in the Maroni River
- Saint-Jean-du-Maroni, a village in the commune of Saint-Laurent-du-Maroni

== See also ==
- Communes of French Guiana
- Lucifer Dékou-Dékou Biological Reserve, a wilderness area in the commune
