= Prison of St-Laurent-du-Maroni =

Former penal colony in French Guiana

Coordinates: 5°30′15″N 54°01′57″W

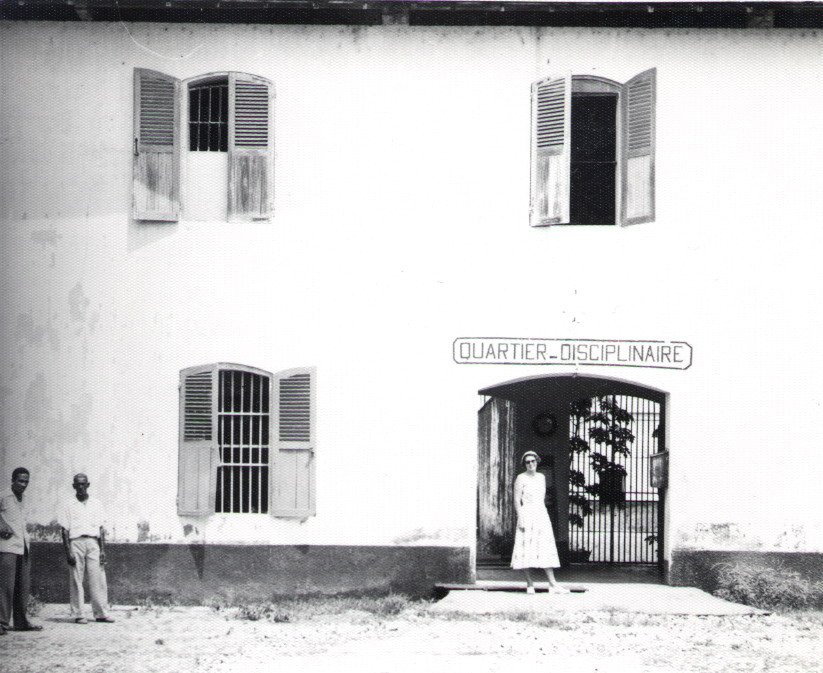
"Quartier - Disciplinaire", Prison of Saint-Laurent-du-Maroni, 1954

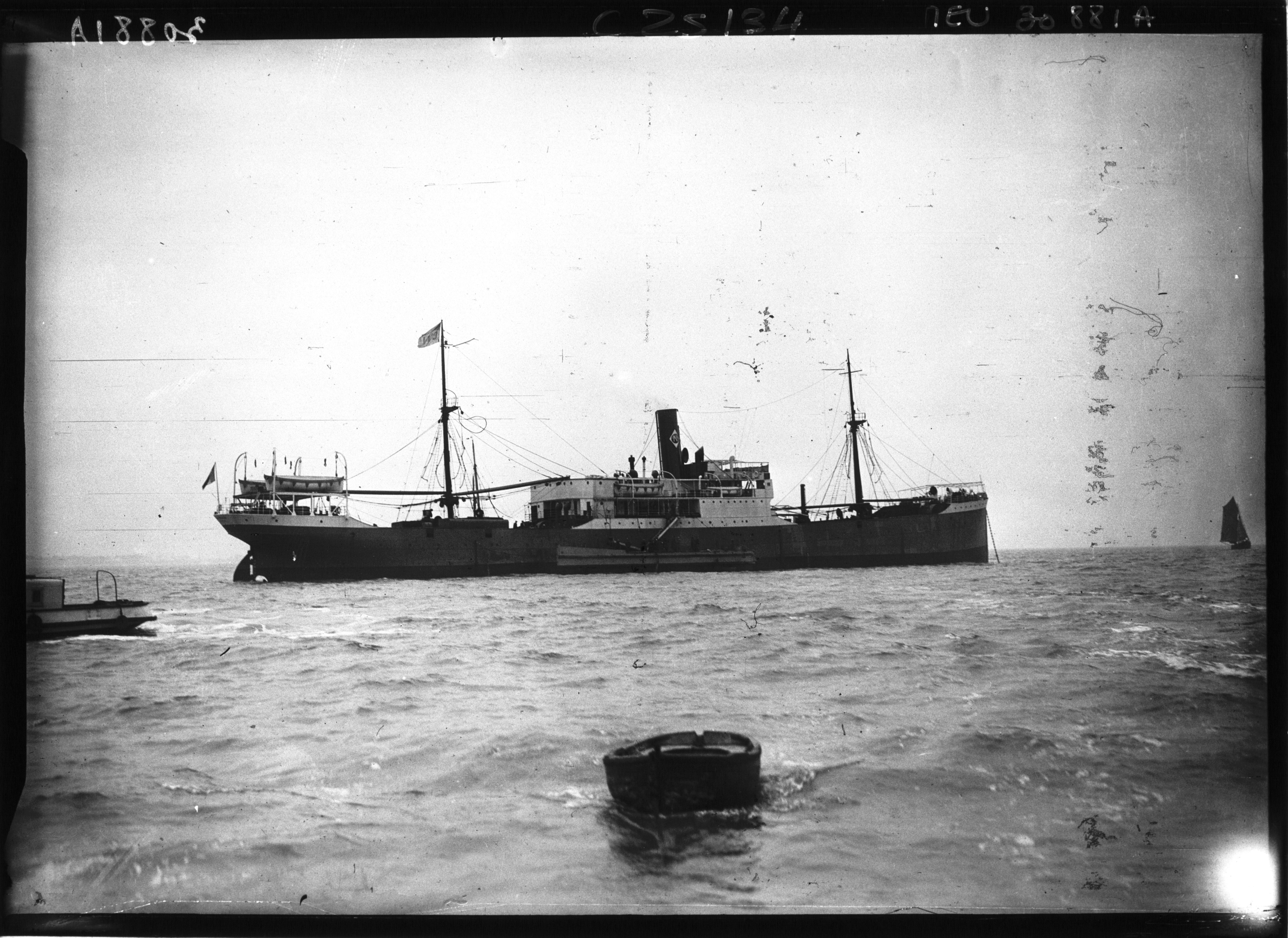
La Martinière docked at Saint-Martin-de-Ré.

The prison of Saint-Laurent-du-Maroni (French: Bagne de Saint-Laurent-du-Maroni) was the main penal colony in French Guiana for more than a century. Some of the buildings were restored in the early 1980s.

== History ==
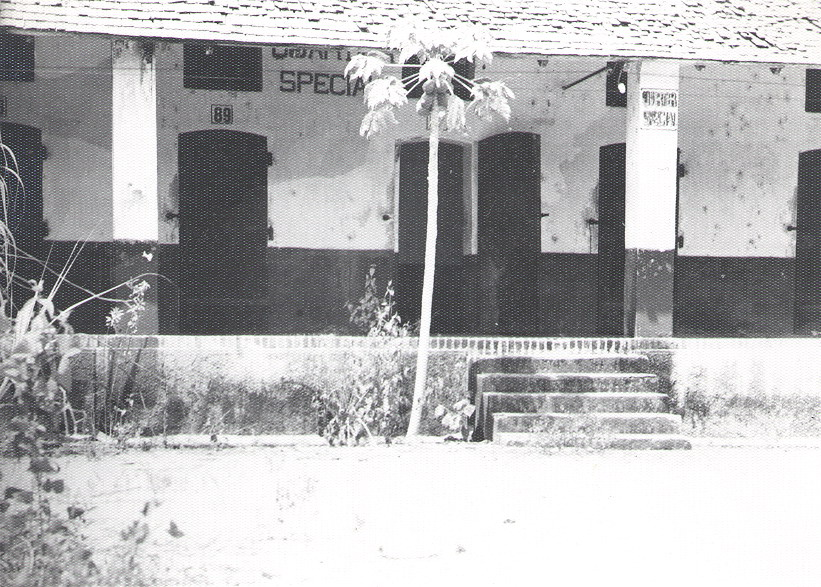
"Quartier Spécial" - Condemned men's block, St. Laurent-du-Maroni, 1954 (the guillotine stood at the spot where the photographer took the photo).

On 22 November 1850, Napoleon III declared: "Six thousand condemned men in our prisons weigh heavily on our budget, becoming increasingly depraved and constantly menacing our society. I think it is possible to make the sentence of forced labour more effective, more moralising, less expensive and more humane by using it to further the progress of French colonisation."

The first batch of prisoners left the Breton port of Brest for the Salvation Islands (Îles du Salut) on 31 March 1852. The prison at St-Laurent-du-Maroni was established on the banks of the Maroni River on 21 February 1858. All the prisoners sent from France were taken there before being transferred to other prisons or camps. The town of Saint-Laurent-du-Maroni proper was founded on 16 March 1880; it was a penal town whose inhabitants were nearly all guards or liberated prisoners. The hospital was built in 1912, and the prison itself closed in 1946, the same year the whole colonial penal system was abolished.

== Life in the prison ==
The prison at Saint-Laurent was but a temporary stop for most prisoners. Only a small number of men ever stayed in Saint-Laurent for long, and they were nearly all employed in the penitentiary administration or were considered harmless and unlikely to try to escape.

When a ship (such as La Loire or La Martinière) arrived from Saint-Martin-de-Ré, the first order of the day was to separate the "chevaux de retour" (literally "returned horses", but meaning the escaped prisoners) and the recidivists from the rest, to send them to the Îles du Salut, from whose shores escape was considered impossible. (A few, however, succeeded; most famously, Henri Charrière, who later wrote Papillon.) The new prisoners then stayed for a while in Saint-Laurent, where they were sorted into different camps or prisons. The ones considered to be shifty and eager to escape were sent to the islands along with the recidivists and ex-escapees. The least dangerous men, condemned to prison for petty offences, were offered jobs in the penitentiary administration. The prisoners were also separated by nationality, as there were special camps reserved for those from Indochina, and the Arabs often became guards.

Since there was a hospital in Saint-Laurent, many prisoners faked illnesses to get sent there, where they had plenty of time to plot escapes (as experienced and written by, among others, Charrière). Since many prisoners worked in the hospital, this was not terribly hard to do.

Those who were lucky enough to stay in Saint-Laurent were generally better treated than prisoners in other camps. Their work was simple, they were free to go wherever they wanted inside the prison, and were given better rations. Camp Charvein was one of the most notorious camps, and known as "Camp de la Mort" (camp of death).

== See also ==
- Devil's Island
- Prison of the Annamites
- René Belbenoit
