= Coulor =

Village and gold mine in French Guiana

- Village and gold mine
- Location in French Guiana
- Coordinates: 5°00′N 53°36′W
- Country: France
- Overseas region: French Guiana
- Arrondissement: Saint-Laurent-du-Maroni
- Commune: Mana

Coulor is a village and gold mine in the commune of Mana, French Guiana. The gold mine is being exploited by the Espérance Mining Company. The mine measures 113 km^{2}.

== See also ==
- Délices
- Montagne d'Or mine
