= Malmanoury =

- Former village
- Location in French Guiana
- Country: France
- Overseas region: French Guiana
- Arrondissement: Cayenne
- Commune: Sinnamary

Malmanoury was a village in the Sinnamary commune of French Guiana. The village was abandoned in 1964 for the construction of the Guiana Space Centre, and its inhabitants were relocated.

== History ==
Archaeological excavation of the village discovered that it had been inhabited as early as the 17th century. Malmanoury was mainly inhabited by Créoles in the 1960s, however the village began as an Amerindian settlement. The houses of the village were mainly located along the road between Kourou and Sinnamary. Malmanoury and the hamlet of Renner had a population of 264 people in 1962. The economy of the village was based on agriculture, and dairy farming. The village had a school, a police station, and a church.

In 1964, the land was expropriated to make way for the Guiana Space Centre. The construction of the Soyuz Launch Complex triggered protests from the former residents.

== Bibliography ==
- Gorman, Alice Claire (2007). "La Terre et l'Espace: Rockets, Prisons, Protests and Heritage in Australia and French Guiana". Archaeologies. 3 (2).
