= Catholic Church in French Guiana =

The Catholic Church in French Guiana is part of the worldwide Catholic Church, under the spiritual leadership of the Pope in Rome.

Around 75% of the population is Catholic and the dependency forms a single diocese - the Diocese of Cayenne.

Erected as the apostolic prefecture of French Guiana-Cayenne in 1651, it remained a prefecture until elevated to a Vicariate in January 1933, and finally to the Diocese of Cayenne in February 1956. The Diocese is currently a suffragan of the Archdiocese of Fort-de-France et Saint-Pierre on the island of Martinique. The current bishop is Alain Ransay, appointed on December 10th, 2021.

== See also ==
- Pan-Amazonian Ecclesial Network (REPAM)
