= Coat of arms of French Guiana =

Coat of arms of French Guiana, adopted in 1901

The coat of arms of French Guiana, a region of France located in South America, consists of a boat full of gold on a green river, charged with three white water lilies. In chief, the fleurs-de-lis of France appear beneath the date 1643. On either side of the shield is an anteater. The Latin motto above the shield, Fert Aurum Industria, translates to "Work Creates Abundance".

== History ==
Initially painted for the city of Cayenne by painter Paul Merwart, brother of acting Cayenne governor Émile Merwart. The coat of arms was completed and presented on the 25th of 1901 September at the local Museum. Many aspects of the coat of arms reference aspects of the city: the date 1643 in which French colonists founded the city of Cayenne alongside the castle at the crest which reflects the city fortifications. The coat of arms has since been adopted by French Guiana as a whole.

== Logo ==
Logo of the territorial authority

The local government also uses a logo depicting the silhouette of the French Guiana map and four arrows that reference the Maroon people.

== See also ==
- Flag of French Guiana
