= Auguste Baudin =

French admiral and colonial administrator

- Born: November 21, 1800; Hoogstraten
- Died: August 1, 1877 (aged 76) Douai
- Allegiance: France
- Branch: Navy
- Rank: Vice Admiral
- Awards: Légion d'honneur

Auguste Laurent François Baudin (French pronunciation: [oɡyst lɔʁɑ̃ fʁɑ̃swa bodɛ̃]; 21 November 1800, Hoogstraten France (now in Belgium) - 1 August 1877, Douai) was a French admiral and colonial administrator. His uncle François-André Baudin was also a naval officer.

== Life ==
Volunteering for the navy in 1817, he was promoted to élève de la marine in 1819, enseigne de vaisseau in 1822, lieutenant de vaisseau in 1829, capitaine de corvette in 1841, capitaine de vaisseau in 1846 and finally contre-amiral in 1855.

He spent most of his career as a naval officer in the French colonies, becoming governor of Senegal and commander of France's West Africa Coast (Côtes occidentales d'Afrique) naval station from 1847 to 1850 (in which role he proclaimed to Senegal the abolition of slavery decreed on 27 April 1848 by the Second French Republic), then governor and commander in chief of the naval division of French Guiana from 1855 to 1859, and finally commander of the navy in Algeria from 1860 to 1862. He was made a grand officer of the Légion d'honneur on 19 September 1860.

== Sources ==
- Dossier militaire au SHD : Côte S.H.A.M. CC7 ALPHA 125.
- Dossier de Légion d'honneur du contre-amiral Auguste Baudin sur le site Leonore.
- Oruno D. Lara : Suffrage universel et colonisation, 1848-1852, L'Harmattan, 2007.
