= Délices =

- Village and gold mine
- Location in French Guiana
- Coordinates: 4°44′10″N 53°46′20″W
- Country: France
- Overseas region: French Guiana
- Arrondissement: Saint-Laurent-du-Maroni
- Commune: Mana

Délices is a village and gold mine in French Guiana, in the commune of Mana. The gold mine is being exploited by the Auplata Mining Group. Délices is one of the biggest placers in French Guiana. Délices is located on the Arouani River which is locally heavily polluted with mercury.

== See also ==
- Coulor
- Montagne d'Or mine
