= Javouhey =

- Town
- Location in French Guiana
- Coordinates: 5°36′25″N 53°49′5″W
- Country: France
- Overseas region: French Guiana
- Arrondissement: Saint-Laurent-du-Maroni
- Commune: Mana

Population (2005)
  - Total: ~1,000

Javouhey is a town in northwest French Guiana in the Mana commune of Saint-Laurent-du-Maroni. Most of its people are Hmong refugees from Laos who settled in French Guiana. Javouhey was founded in 1978, as the second Hmong settlement village in French Guiana after Cacao. The village is on a former agricultural colony founded by Anne-Marie Javouhey in 1822. The reasoning was that living, and working conditions were similar to their native land. As of 2005, the village has a population of about 1,000 people.

== Overview ==
There are two primary schools, the new one just completed in 2006, a Catholic church, and the biggest Protestant church in French Guiana. There are three family owned stores, one with a gas station. There is a Sunday market, where foods, souvenirs, and Hmong crafts can be purchase. In comparison to the Hmong villages in French Guiana; Javouhey is more so a traditional Hmong-Laos village, while Cacao - a more Hmong-French village. The contrast is in the area of lifestyle; clothing, home, and practice of tradition.

The best time to visit Javouhey is during the week of Christmas, when the Hmong New Year's festival is held during the hot and dry season. There is a French-owned Bungolow hotels a few minutes outside of Javouhey with minimum accommodation. Javouhey is about 2.5 km^{2} (1 sq mi) in size. The economy is based on agriculture.

The town has a football club, AS Javouhey Mana, who won the 1989–90 and 1990–91 editions of the Coupe de Guyane.
