= Alikoto Tapele =

- Village
- Location in French Guiana
- Coordinates: 3.0842°N 52.3332°W
- Country: France
- Overseas region: French Guiana
- Arrondissement: Saint-Georges
- Commune: Camopi
- Elevation: 72 m (236 ft)

Alikoto Tapele (formerly Alicoto) is an Amerindian village of the Wayampi tribe in southeast French Guiana, close to the border with Brazil. Alicoto was originally home to the chief of the Wayampis. The Wayampis in French Guiana traditionally had very little contact with the outside world, but in the 1940s, captain Eugène, the chief, did allow visits to Saint-Georges to purchase salt. In 1949, the population was 30, however the village was abandoned in 1971. The village was resettled by 2016 as Alikoto Tapele.

The village is at an important point in the Oyapock River, where there is a waterfall in the river. The 1763 map of Audiffredy described it as "about 800 feet long and a 10 feet drop". Many villages have existed near the waterfall, because of the abundance of fish.

== Bibliography ==
- Grenand, Pierre; Grenand, Françoise Grenand (2017). "Pour une histoire de la cartographie des territoires teko et wayãpi (Commune de Camopi, Guyane française)". Open Edition. Revue d’ethnoécologie (in French).
