= Saint-Jean-du-Maroni =

- Village
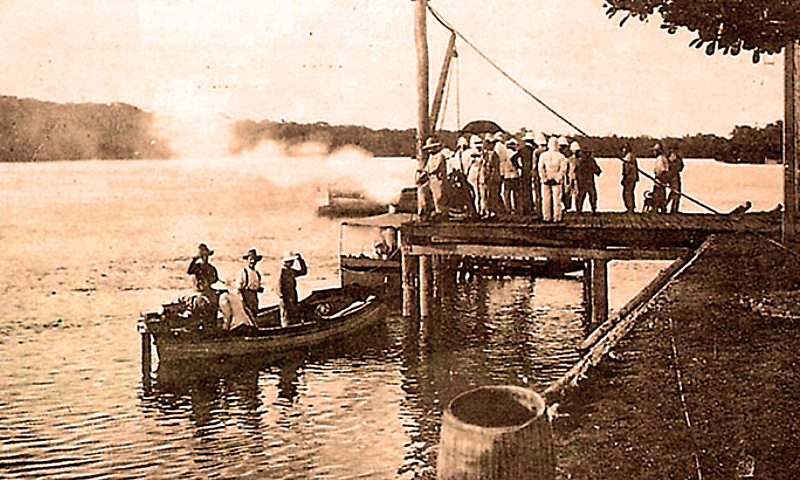
- Convicts in 1885 in Saint-Jean-de-Maroni

- Location in French Guiana
- Coordinates: 5°24′20″N 54°4′40″W
- Country: France
- Overseas region: French Guiana
- Arrondissement: Saint-Laurent-du-Maroni
- Commune: Saint-Laurent-du-Maroni

Saint-Jean-du-Maroni (French pronunciation: [sɛ̃ ʒɑ̃ dy maʁɔni]) is a village in French Guiana, in the commune of Saint-Laurent-du-Maroni on the river Maroni. The village is mainly inhabited by Ndyuka Maroons.

== History ==
Saint-Jean-du-Maroni was established in 1857 as a sub camp of the penal colony Saint-Laurent-du-Maroni, where the convicts had to perform forced labour. When the first prisoners arrived in Camp de la Rélégation on 20 June 1887, nothing was ready and they had to build the camp themselves. Most prisoners were housed in straw huts. The camps were abolished in 1946.

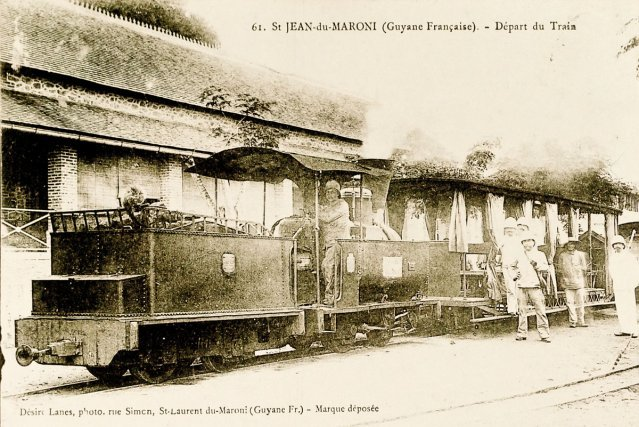
Train at St Jean-du-Maroni (1900)

Between 1890 and 1897, a 16 kilometre Decauville railway was constructed between Saint-Laurent-du-Maroni and Saint-Jean-du-Maroni. The railway was abandoned after the penal camps closed.

In 1987, Jacques Chirac as Prime Minister established Zones of Collective Use Rights (ZDUC). Saint-Jean-du-Maroni is the only Ndyuka village in France with a ZDUC status. ZDUC means that the village has communal land for hunting, fishing, agriculture and gathering.

During 27 and 28 June 1988, a secret meeting was held in Saint-Jean-du-Maroni between the Suriname National Army, Jungle Commando, and France as mediator to discuss peace after the Surinamese Interior War which resulted in the 1989 Kourou ceasefire accords.

Saint-Jean-du-Maroni is home to a military base of the Regiment of the Adapted Military Service (RSMA), and is the site where the General Staff is located.
