= Cacao, French Guiana =

Cacao
- Village
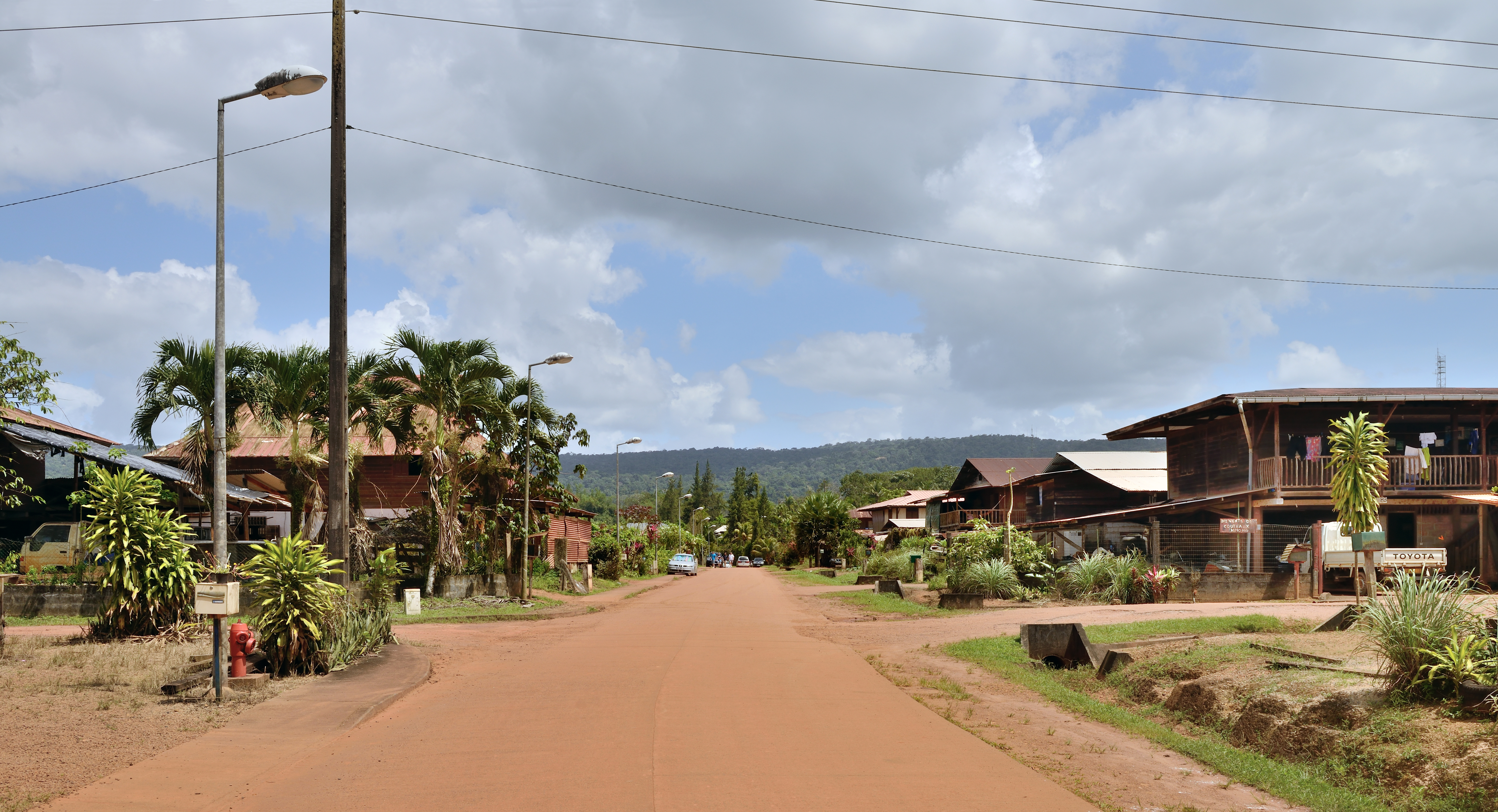

- Location in French Guiana
- Coordinates: 4°34′10″N 52°28′9″W
- Country: France
- Overseas region: French Guiana
- Arrondissement: Cayenne
- Commune: Roura

Population (2007)
  - Total: 750

Cacao is a village in French Guiana, lying on the Comté river to the south of Cayenne. Most of the population are Hmong farmers, refugees from Laos who were resettled in French Guiana in 1977. The reasoning was that the living and working conditions of the area were similar to the Hmong's native land. As of 2007, the village had a population of 750 people.

== Overview ==
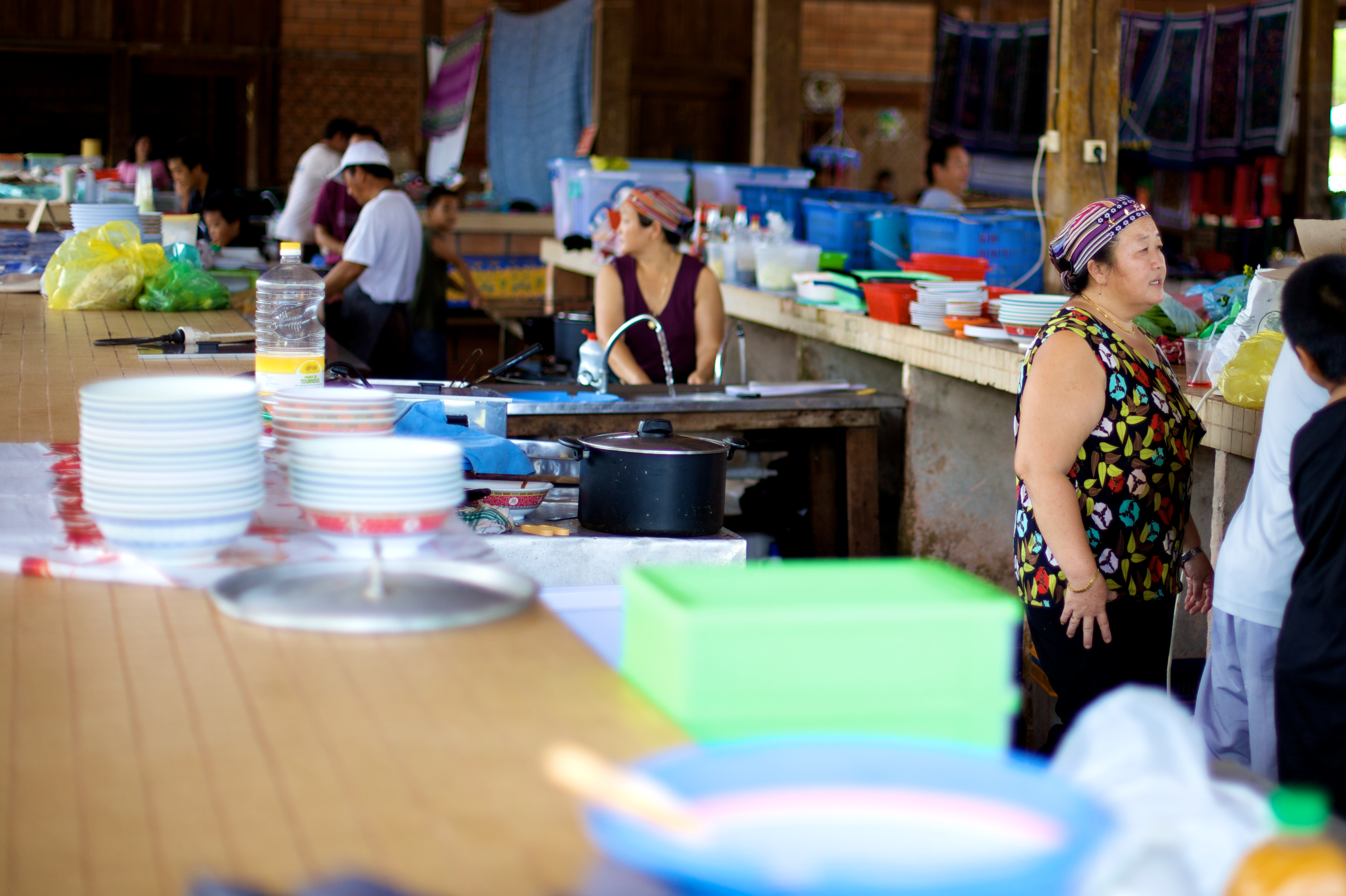
Cacao Market

The village is four blocks in size, with narrow streets. Local commercial outlets include restaurants, grocery and bread stores. There are two primary schools, but no secondary education facilities. Public buildings include an insect museum, a library, a church, and gendarmerie. There is also a Sunday morning market at which Hmong weaving, embroidery and food can be purchased. The main hotel in Cacao is L'Auberge des Orpailleurs. Tourist activities include jungle tours, canoeing and kayaking. During December the village hosts a Hmong New Year's festival that lasts about 3–4 days.

== Economy ==
The economy is based on agriculture. The villagers have 1,375 hectares of land. A freshwater prawn farm has been setup and is exporting 1 to 1.2 tons to the United States and Puerto Rico every month. A sawmill employs 70 people.

== Geography ==
=== Climate ===
Cacao has a tropical rainforest climate (Köppen climate classification Af). The average annual temperature in Cacao is 27.1 °C (80.8 °F). The average annual rainfall is 3,657.8 mm (144.01 in) with May as the wettest month. The temperatures are highest on average in October, at around 27.9 °C (82.2 °F), and lowest in January, at around 26.4 °C (79.5 °F). The highest temperature ever recorded in Cacao was 37.5 °C (99.5 °F) on 31 October 1999; the coldest temperature ever recorded was 17.1 °C (62.8 °F) on 25 February 1980.

Climate data for Cacao (1981–2010 averages, extremes 1978−present)
| Month | Jan | Feb | Mar | Apr | May | Jun | Jul | Aug | Sep | Oct | Nov | Dec | Year |
|---|---|---|---|---|---|---|---|---|---|---|---|---|---|
| Record high °C (°F) | 35.0 (95.0) | 34.5 (94.1) | 34.6 (94.3) | 35.0 (95.0) | 35.5 (95.9) | 36.4 (97.5) | 36.5 (97.7) | 36.5 (97.7) | 36.7 (98.1) | 37.5 (99.5) | 37.0 (98.6) | 35.5 (95.9) | 37.5 (99.5) |
| Mean daily maximum °C (°F) | 30.4 (86.7) | 30.5 (86.9) | 30.8 (87.4) | 31.1 (88.0) | 31.1 (88.0) | 31.6 (88.9) | 32.2 (90.0) | 33.2 (91.8) | 33.8 (92.8) | 33.9 (93.0) | 33.0 (91.4) | 31.4 (88.5) | 31.9 (89.4) |
| Daily mean °C (°F) | 26.4 (79.5) | 26.5 (79.7) | 26.7 (80.1) | 27.0 (80.6) | 27.0 (80.6) | 27.0 (80.6) | 27.0 (80.6) | 27.5 (81.5) | 27.7 (81.9) | 27.9 (82.2) | 27.5 (81.5) | 26.8 (80.2) | 27.1 (80.8) |
| Mean daily minimum °C (°F) | 22.4 (72.3) | 22.4 (72.3) | 22.5 (72.5) | 22.8 (73.0) | 22.9 (73.2) | 22.4 (72.3) | 21.9 (71.4) | 21.9 (71.4) | 21.7 (71.1) | 21.9 (71.4) | 22.0 (71.6) | 22.3 (72.1) | 22.3 (72.1) |
| Record low °C (°F) | 18.0 (64.4) | 17.1 (62.8) | 18.4 (65.1) | 18.5 (65.3) | 19.0 (66.2) | 19.8 (67.6) | 19.0 (66.2) | 19.5 (67.1) | 19.0 (66.2) | 19.0 (66.2) | 18.5 (65.3) | 19.0 (66.2) | 17.1 (62.8) |
| Average precipitation mm (inches) | 394.7 (15.54) | 345.1 (13.59) | 338.3 (13.32) | 459.0 (18.07) | 570.9 (22.48) | 397.1 (15.63) | 252.8 (9.95) | 161.9 (6.37) | 102.2 (4.02) | 105.8 (4.17) | 185.1 (7.29) | 344.9 (13.58) | 3,657.8 (144.01) |
| Average precipitation days (≥ 1.0 mm) | 24.8 | 21.4 | 21.7 | 23.5 | 28.1 | 25.8 | 23.5 | 17.6 | 12.5 | 12.2 | 16.9 | 24.2 | 252.1 |
Source: Meteociel
