= Balaté =

- Village
- Location in French Guiana
- Coordinates: 5.48279°N 54.04390°W
- Country: France
- Overseas region: French Guiana
- Arrondissement: Saint-Laurent-du-Maroni
- Commune: Saint-Laurent-du-Maroni

Government
  - Captain: Sylvio Van der Pijl

Population (2017)
  - Total: ca. 600

Balaté (French pronunciation: [balate]) is a village of Lokono Amerindians in the commune of Saint-Laurent-du-Maroni at the confluence of the Maroni River and the Balaté River in French Guiana.

== History ==
Balaté was founded in 1946 near the town of Saint-Laurent-du-Maroni. The village had a population of about 600 people as of 2017. In 1987, Jacques Chirac as Prime Minister established Zones of Collective Use Rights (ZDUC). Since 1993, the village has 3,710 hectares of communal land located about 10 kilometres from the village to be used for fishing, hunting and subsistence farming.

In 2006, Léon Bertrand, who was both Mayor of Saint-Laurent-du-Maroni and Delegate Minister of Tourism, developed plans for a large tourist resort with a luxury hotel and casino in the village of Balaté. Captain Brigitte Wyngaarde, the traditional village chief, successfully opposed the plans.

== Bibliography ==
- Demenois, Julien; Wyngaarde, Brigitte (2006). "Espoirs et difficultés du transfert de la gestion forestière à deux communautés de Guyane et du Cameroun". Bois et Forets des Tropiques. 289.
