= Canton of Mana =

- Former canton
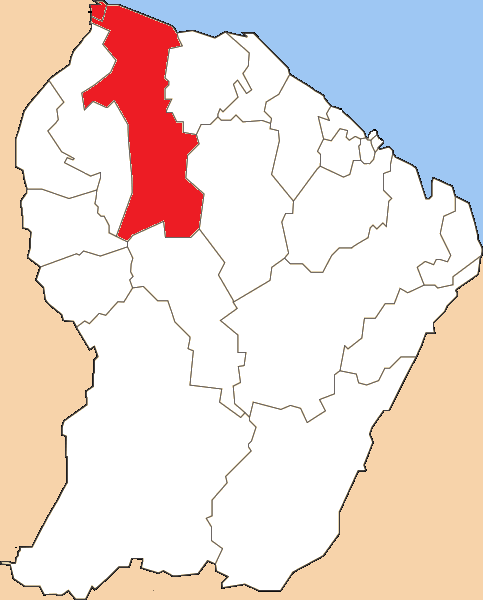
- Location of the Canton of Mana in French Guiana
- Country: France
- Overseas region and department: French Guiana{{{region}}}
- No. of communes: {{{nbcomm}}}
- Disbanded: 31 December 2015
- Area: 6,520 km^{2} (2,520 sq mi)
- Population (2012): 10,661
  - Density: 1.64/km^{2} (4.23/sq mi)

The canton of Mana (French: Canton de Mana) was one of the former cantons of the Guyane department in French Guiana. Located in the arrondissement of Saint-Laurent-du-Maroni in the northwestern part of the territory, the canton consisted of the communes of Mana and Awala-Yalimapo, with its administrative seat in Mana. The canton had a population of 10,661 in 2012. The canton was abolished on 31 December 2015 as part of the territorial reorganisation of French Guiana.

== History ==
The territory of the canton of Mana was historically inhabited by the indigenous Kalina people prior to French colonisation. European settlement in the area expanded during the nineteenth century following the establishment of the commune of Mana in 1828 under the direction of Anne-Marie Javouhey, founder of the Sisters of Saint Joseph of Cluny.

The settlement was established as an agricultural colony along the Mana River. Following the abolition of slavery in the French colonies in 1848, Mana became a settlement area for formerly enslaved people and developed as an important agricultural centre in western French Guiana, particularly through rice cultivation and cattle raising.

The canton later functioned as an administrative division of the Guyane department within the arrondissement of Saint-Laurent-du-Maroni and included the communes of Mana and Awala-Yalimapo.

As part of the territorial reorganisation of French Guiana, the cantons of the department were abolished on 31 December 2015 following the implementation of Law No. 2011-884 of 27 July 2011, which created the territorial collective of French Guiana. The territory of the former canton became part of the new electoral sections established under the reorganisation.

== Demographics ==
According to the Institut national de la statistique et des études économiques (INSEE), the canton of Mana had a population of 10,661 in 2012.

== Administration ==
List of successive general councillors
Term		Name	Party	Notes	Ref.
1946	1952	Maurice Demougeot			
1952	1955				
1955	1979	Paule Berthelot	DVD then UDR then RPR	First women elected to the General Council	
1979	1985	Emmanuel Bellony	RPR	President of the General Council (1982-1985)	
1985	1998	Georges Patient	DVG	Mayor of Mana (1989-2007) President of the CC de l'Ouest guyanais (1994-2001) Senator (2008–present)	
1998	2004	Joseph Pavant	Independent		
2004	2015	Albéric Benth	PSG	Vice-president of the General Council (2008-2011)	
