= Cantons of the Guyane department =

The following is a list of the 19 former cantons of the French Guiana department, an overseas department of France, sorted by arrondissement. The cantons were abolished in 2015, when the Assembly of French Guiana replaced the General Council of French Guiana and the Regional Council of French Guiana.

== Arrondissement of Cayenne (16 cantons) ==
- Approuague-Kaw
- Cayenne 1st Canton Nord-Ouest
- Cayenne 2nd Canton Nord-Est
- Cayenne 3rd Canton Sud-Ouest
- Cayenne 4th Canton Centre
- Cayenne 5th Canton Sud
- Cayenne 6th Canton Sud-Est
- Iracoubo
- Kourou
- Macouria
- Matoury
- Montsinéry-Tonnegrande
- Rémiré-Montjoly
- Roura
- Saint-Georges-de-l'Oyapock
- Sinnamary

== Arrondissement of Saint-Laurent-du-Maroni (3 cantons) ==
- Mana
- Maripasoula
- Saint-Laurent-du-Maroni
