= Canton of Iracoubo =

Former canton of French Guiana, France

- Former canton
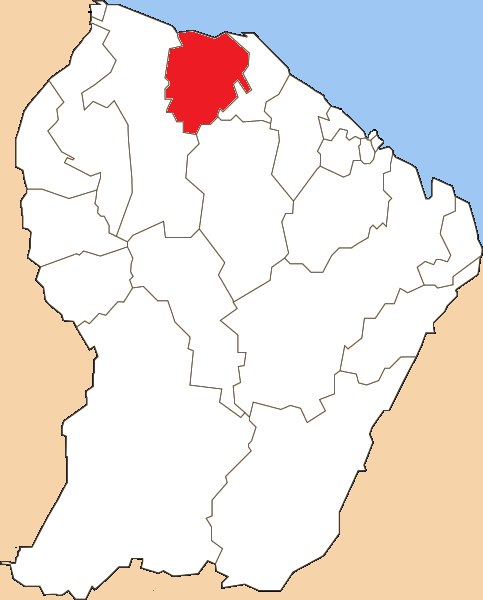
- Location of the canton of Iracoubo in French Guiana
- Country: France
- Overseas region and department: French Guiana{{{region}}}
- No. of communes: {{{nbcomm}}}
- Disbanded: 31 December 2015
- Area: 2,762 km^{2} (1,066 sq mi)
- Population (2012): 1,955
  - Density: 0.7078/km^{2} (1.833/sq mi)

The canton of Iracoubo (French: Canton d'Iracoubo) was one of the former cantons of the Guyane department in French Guiana. Located in the arrondissement of Cayenne, its administrative seat was located in Iracoubo, the only commune in the canton. The canton had a population of 1,955 in 2012. The canton was abolished on 31 December 2015 as part of the territorial reorganisation of French Guiana.

== Name ==
The meaning of Iracoubo in the Kalina language is "place of the great river" or "great riverbank". The name is derived from "ira" meaning "river" and "coubo" meaning "great" or "large." This name is likely due to Iracoubo's location on the banks of the Iracoubo River.

== History ==
The Iracoubo area became a refuge for surviving Acadian families following the disastrous 1764 Kourou colonisation campaign. Out of 14,000 settlers sent to French Guiana, around 11,000 perished from disease and malnutrition on the Salvation Islands, and 2,000 were repatriated. Among the remaining 1,000 survivors were roughly 400 Acadians. In 1765, about forty of these Acadian peasant and fishing families established communities along the coast, including in Iracoubo.

The canton later functioned as an administrative division of the Guyane department within the arrondissement of Cayenne and included Macouria as its only commune.

As part of the territorial reorganisation of French Guiana, the cantons of the department were abolished on 31 December 2015 following the implementation of Law No. 2011-884 of 27 July 2011, which created the territorial collective of French Guiana. The territory of the former canton became part of the new electoral sections established under the reorganisation.

== Demographics ==
According to the Institut national de la statistique et des études économiques (INSEE), the canton of Macouria had a population of 1,955 in 2012.

== Administration ==
List of successive general councillors
In office		Name	Party	Notes	Ref.
1955	1961	M. Liguon	DVD		
1961	1973	Robert Vignon	UNR then UDR	Senator (1962–1971); Mayor of Maripasoula (1969–1976)	
1973	1979	M. Cyrille	UDR then RPR		
1979	1985	Georges Othily	PSG	Senator (1989–2008); Regional councillor (1982–2010); President of the Regional Council (1982–1992); Mayor of Iracoubo (1995–2001)	
1985	1998	Ferdinand Madeleine	RPR		
1998	2015	Daniel Mangal	DVD	Mayor of Iracoubo (2001–2014)	
