= Canton of Montsinéry-Tonnegrande =

- Former canton
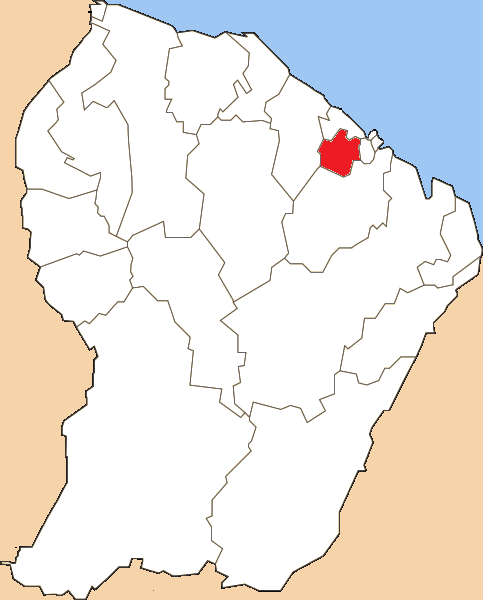
- Location of the canton of Montsinéry-Tonnegrande in French Guiana
- Country: France
- Overseas region and department: French Guiana{{{region}}}
- No. of communes: {{{nbcomm}}}
- Disbanded: 31 December 2015
- Area: 737.20 km^{2} (284.63 sq mi)
- Population (2012): 2,483
  - Density: 3.368/km^{2} (8.723/sq mi)

The canton of Montsinéry-Tonnegrande (French: Canton de Montsinéry-Tonnegrande) is one of the former cantons of the Guyane department in French Guiana. It was located in the arrondissement of Cayenne. Its administrative seat was located in Montsinéry-Tonnegrande, the canton's sole commune. Its population was 2,483 in 2012.

== Administration ==
List of successive general councillors
In office		Name	Party	Notes
1958	1964	M. Catherine	PSG	
1964	1978	Léopold Héder	PSG	Deputy (1962–1967) Senator (1971–1978) President of the General Council (1970–1973) Mayor of Cayenne (1965–1978)
1978	2008	André Lecante	DVG	Mayor of Montsinéry-Tonnegrande (1977–2001) President of the General Council (1998–2001)
2008	2015	Christian Porthos	Autonomism	
