= Montagne d'Or mine =

- Concessions of Montagne d'Or

- Location within French Guiana
- Location: Saint-Laurent-du-Maroni, French Guiana; 4.7155°N 53.9398°W
- Products: Gold
- Company: Orea Mining Corporation
- Website: https://oreamining.com/

The Montagne d'Or mine (French for 'Mountain of Gold') is one of the largest gold mine projects in French Guiana, an overseas region of France. The mine is located in the north-west of the country in the Arrondissement of Saint-Laurent-du-Maroni. The mine has estimated reserves of 5,370,000 troy ounces (167,000 kg) of gold.

The mine is a continuation of the Paul Isnard mine discovered in 1875. It is considered very controversial, because it is located between the two parts of the Lucifer Dékou-Dékou Biological Reserve, and is sometimes less than 500 metres from the perimeter of the wilderness area.

== Geography ==
The Paul-Isnard mining concessions, which include the “Montagne d'Or” site, are located in the commune of Saint-Laurent-du-Maroni, in the French overseas department of Guyana. They are located south of the town of Saint-Laurent-du-Maroni, to which they are linked by a 120 km forest track, passing through the Apatou Crossroads. They are located 180 km west of Cayenne. They belong to the basin of the Mana River which has its mouth near the estuary of the Maroni River, between the villages of Awala-Yalimapo and Mana. The Montagne d'Or site is located in an area where mining is authorized, under certain conditions, between the two parts of the Lucifer Dékou-Dékou Biological Reserve, with the Dékou-Dékou Massif to the south, and the Lucifer Massif to the north, both of which are areas in which mining is prohibited.

== Geology ==
The "Montagne d'Or" sector is located in the Guyanese "Highlands" region, north of the "Central Plateau" predominantly granite, in a region made up of Paleoproterozoic rocks, and more precisely the Rhyacian. These are volcanic rocks (basalts and rhyolites) that belong to the Paramaca greenstone belt. These rocks correspond to the eroded parts of a volcanic arc sequence, formed between 2.18 and 2.13 billion years ago. During the formation of the Transamazonian mountain range, these rocks were folded to form synclines separated by a set of granites of sodium composition, the central complex of TTG tonalite-trondhjemite-granodiorite, dated between 2.15 and 2.12 billion years ago.

The Montagne d'Or gold deposit is of the volcanogenic sulphide cluster type. In this area, the volcanic rocks are composed of pillow lavas, testifying to underwater eruptions and felsic rocks, resulting from explosive volcanic eruptions. Intrusions of granitic rocks and late diabase dykes cut the whole. The rocks are deformed in an east-west direction and a strong schistosity testifies to the flattening of the rocks in a zone of deformation. Regional metamorphism varies from the level of the upper green schists to that of the lower amphibolites. The mineralization, arranged in two main zones and two secondary zones, is disseminated or in small veins. The gold is associated with pyrite, pyrrhotite and chalcopyrite, in a zone rich in chlorite and sericite.

== Project ==
Montagne d'Or is a mining project set up as a gold concession in French Guiana. It is a joint venture by the Canadian company Columbus Gold (45%) and the Russian company Nordgold (55%). Columbus Gold is in charge of the exploration while Nordgold is responsible for the extraction, which is scheduled to start in 2022. The companies plan to extract gold by the use of open-pit mining techniques, using a closed-circuit cyanidation process to recover the metal. The site has proven mineral reserves of 8.25 million t at 1.99 g/t (530,000 ounces), and probable mineral reserves of 45.87 million t at 1.50 g/t (2.2 million ounces). In 2015, Emmanuel Macron, Minister of the Economy with responsibility for mining, visited the project and gave his support for a responsible mine. Following criticism by environmentalists, and campaigning by indigenous peoples, the government of France withdrew its support for the project on 27 May 2019. The mining licence expires in 2023, and the future of the project was in doubt. In December 2020, a French court ordered the French government to extend the mining concession, and required them within the next six months to set a duration for the extension. In April 2021, the National assembly is considering reform of the mining code as part of the effort to mitigate against climate change, with the government seeking to be able to take legislative measures by ordinance.

== See also ==
- Coulor
- Délices
- Paul Isnard
