= Acarouany =

- Village
- Location in French Guiana
- Coordinates: 5.5930°N 53.8154°W
- Country: France
- Overseas region: French Guiana
- Arrondissement: Saint-Laurent-du-Maroni
- Commune: Mana

Acarouany is a village in the Mana commune of Saint-Laurent-du-Maroni in French Guiana. Acarouany was the location of a leper colony between 1833 and 1979. From 1989 until 1992, it was the location of a Surinamese refugee camp. The village is located on the Acarouany River.

== Leper colony ==
In 1828, the Ministry of the Navy and Colonies sent Sister Anne-Marie Javouhey to Mana to colonize the area. Lepers up to then had been treated on the Salvation Islands. In 1833, Sister Javouhe set out to create a leprosarium south of the village of Mana on the Acarouany River. At first the patients were housed in straw huts. The construction of a leprosarium with brick buildings took three years.

Between 1882 and 1886, the leprosarium was directed by Paul-Louis Simond. After returning to France, he wrote his doctoral thesis Leprosy and its means of spread in French Guiana for which Simond was awarded the Godard Prize. Simond would later prove that the flea spread the bubonic plague.

In 1947, the leprosarium was modernized and renovated. However, the Sisters still remained in charge. In 1979, the leprosarium was closed.

== Surinamese refugees ==
The Surinamese Interior War, which was fought between 1986 and 1992, resulted in refugees crossing the border between Suriname and French Guiana. The village of Acarouany was rediscovered by the refugees and squatted. In 1989, a camp was built near the village to house the refugees. Originally the camp was home to 1,465 refugees. The camp was dismantled in 1992, however Acarouany remained an inhabited village.

In 1999, the village was declared an historic monument. The village is nowadays inhabited by Surinamese, Haitian, Brazilian, and Hmong people. The Hmong are from neighbouring Javouhey, a resettlement village founded in 1978. In 2013, the mayor of Mana removed 44 families who were living in the village illegally.
