= Canton of Kourou =

Former canton of French Guiana, France

- Former canton
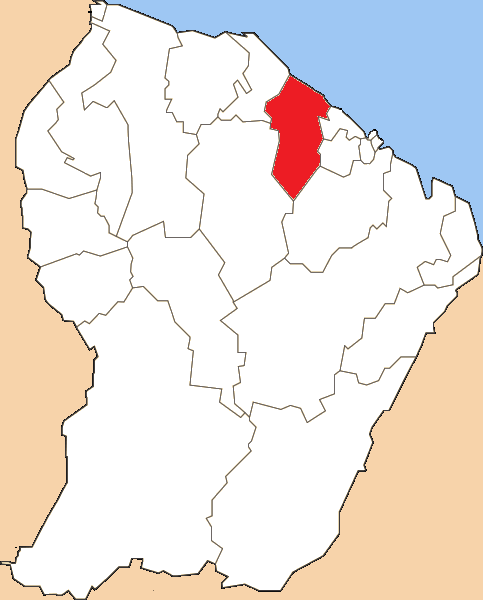
- Location of the canton of Kourou in French Guiana
- Country: France
- Overseas region and department: French Guiana{{{region}}}
- No. of communes: {{{nbcomm}}}
- Disbanded: 31 December 2015
- Area: 2,160 km^{2} (830 sq mi)
- Population (2012): 25,490
  - Density: 11.8/km^{2} (30.6/sq mi)

The canton of Kourou (French: Canton de Kourou) was one of the former cantons of the Guyane department in French Guiana. Located in the arrondissement of Cayenne, its administrative seat was located in Kourou, the only commune in the canton. The canton had a population of 25,490 in 2012. The canton was abolished on 31 December 2015 as part of the territorial reorganisation of French Guiana.

== History ==
Following the establishment of a French Guiana penal colony by Emperor Napoleon III in 1852, Kourou became a major mainland hub for prisoner reception and forced labour. The system was formalised by the law of 30 May 1854, which redirected convicts from metropolitan France to colonial sites. The penal administration distributed inmates by category: 52,905 common criminals occupied mainland camps in and around Kourou, while 17,372 repeat offenders faced permanent exile. Meanwhile, political prisoners were isolated on the nearby Salvation Islands, off the coast of Kourou. This included Devil's Island (Île du Diable), where Captain Alfred Dreyfus was famously imprisoned from March 1895 to June 1899 during the Dreyfus affair.

The canton later functioned as an administrative division of the Guyane department within the arrondissement of Cayenne and included Macouria as its only commune.

As part of the territorial reorganisation of French Guiana, the cantons of the department were abolished on 31 December 2015 following the implementation of Law No. 2011-884 of 27 July 2011, which created the territorial collective of French Guiana. The territory of the former canton became part of the new electoral sections established under the reorganisation.

== Demographics ==
According to the Institut national de la statistique et des études économiques (INSEE), the canton of Macouria had a population of 25,490 in 2012.

== Administration ==
List of successive general councillors
In office		Name	Party	Notes	Ref.
1955	1973	M. Magne	DVD		
1973	1998	Serge Patient	DVG then UDF	Deputy Mayor of Kourou; President of Regional Council (1974–1980)	
1998	2004	Robert Putcha	DVG		
2004	2011	Juliana Rimane	UMP	Municipal councillor for Kourou; Deputy (2002–2007)	
2011	2015	François Ringuet	Independent	Mayor of Kourou (2014–present); President of the CC des Savanes	
