= Canton of Remire-Montjoly =

- Former canton
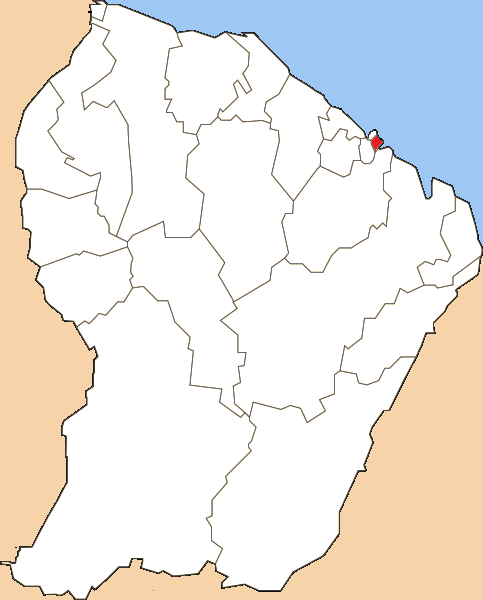
- Location of the canton of Remire-Montjoly in French Guiana
- Country: France
- Overseas region and department: French Guiana{{{region}}}
- No. of communes: {{{nbcomm}}}
- Disbanded: 31 December 2015
- Area: 46.11 km^{2} (17.80 sq mi)
- Population (2012): 20,689
  - Density: 448.7/km^{2} (1,162/sq mi)

The canton of Remire-Montjoly (French: Canton de Remire-Montjoly) is one of the former cantons of the Guyane department in French Guiana. It was located in the arrondissement of Cayenne. Its administrative seat was located in Remire-Montjoly, the canton's sole commune. Its population was 20,689 in 2012.

== Administration ==
List of successive general councillors
| In office | | Name | Party | Notes | Ref. |
|---|---|---|---|---|---|
| 1951 | 1964 | Saint-Ange Methon | | Mayor of Remire-Montjoly (1954-1965) | |
| 1964 | 1982 | Jacques Lony | PSG | President of the Regional Council (1980-1982) | |
| 1982 | 1985 | Étienne-Yves Barrat | PSG | | |
| 1985 | 2011 | Joseph Ho Ten You | DVG | Municipal councillor of Remire-Montjoly President of the General Council (2001-2004) | |
| 2011 | 2015 | Claude Plénet | DVG | Municipal councillor of Remire-Montjoly | |
