= Canton of Sinnamary =

- Former canton
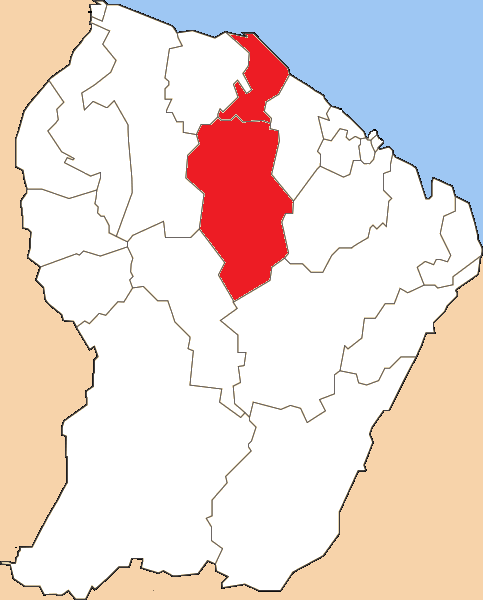
- Location of the canton in French Guiana
- Country: France
- Overseas region and department: French Guiana{{{region}}}
- No. of communes: {{{nbcomm}}}
- Disbanded: 31 December 2015
- Area: 7,020 km^{2} (2,710 sq mi)
- Population (2012): 3,373
  - Density: 0.480/km^{2} (1.24/sq mi)

The canton of Sinnamary (French: Canton de Sinnamary) is one of the former cantons of the Guyane department in French Guiana. It was located in the arrondissement of Cayenne. The canton consisted of two communes and its seat was located in Sinnamary. Its population was 3,373 in 2012.

== Communes ==
The canton was composed of 2 communes:

- Sinnamary
- Saint-Élie

== Administration ==
List of successive general councillors
| Term | | Name | Party |
|---|---|---|---|
| 1946 | 1958 | Roland Verderosa | |
| 1958 | 1962 | Gustave Létard | DVD |
| 1962 | 1964 | Loïs Coupra | |
| 1964 | 1970 | Emané Beaufort | DVD |
| 1970 | 1976 | Roland Verderosa | DVG |
| 1976 | 1996 | Élie Castor | DVG then PSG |
| 1996 | 2008 | Georges Madeleine | DVD |
| 2008 | 2015 | Patrice Clet | |
