= Paul-Louis Simond =

French physician and biologist

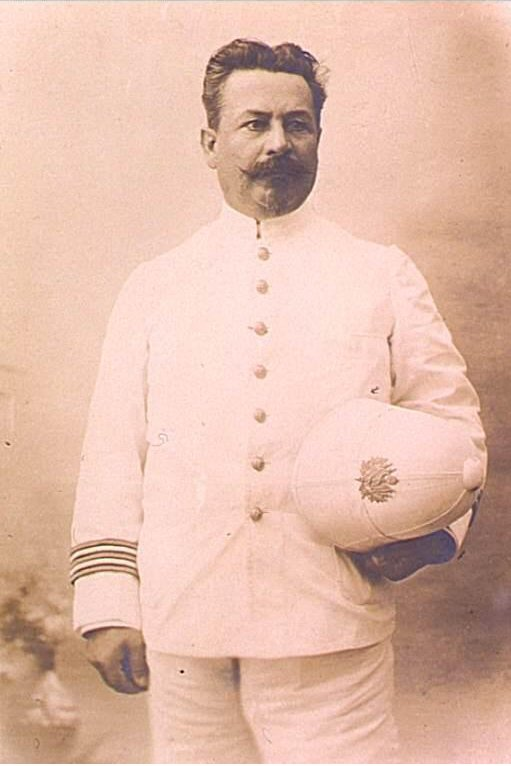
- Paul-Louis Simond in colonial army doctor holding first class at Fort-de-France
- Born: 30 July 1858; Beaufort-sur-Gervanne, Drome, France
- Died: 3 March 1947 (aged 88); Valence, France
- Education: École du Santé Navale
- Known for: Discovery of the role of the rat flea in the transmission of bubonic plague
- Awards: Godard Thesis Prize (1887); Barbier Prize (1898); Legion of Honour (1901)
- Scientific career
- Fields: Biology, physician

Paul-Louis Simond (30 July 1858 – 3 March 1947) was a French physician, chief medical officer and biologist. His major contribution to science was his demonstration, during the Bombay plague epidemic, that the intermediates in the transmission of bubonic plague from rats to humans are the fleas Xenopsylla cheopis that dwell on infected rats.

== Early life ==
Paul-Louis Simond was born in Beaufort-sur-Gervanne, (Drome, France) on 30 July 1858. His father was a pastor of the Reformed Church. From 1878 to 1882 Simond was an assistant in Medical and Biological Sciences at the School of Medicine and Pharmacy in Bordeaux, and he began his medical training there. From 1882 to 1886 he served as director of the leprosarium in Acarouany near Saint-Laurent-du-Maroni, French Guiana, where he contracted an attenuated form of yellow fever. He returned to Bordeaux in 1886 and the following year he received his medical doctorate with a prize-winning thesis on leprosy.

== Career ==
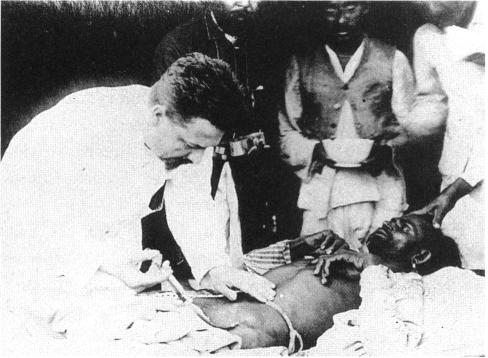
Paul-Louis Simond injecting plague vaccine in Karachi in June 4th 1898.

In 1895 Simond began work at the Pasteur Institute in Paris and while working in the laboratory of Elie Metchnikoff, he was the first to provide a comprehensive description of the sexual reproductive processes of Coccidia. This work provided experimental support for the theory of evolutionary dimorphism which had been put forward by R. Pfeiffer.

In 1897, when Alexandre Yersin was transferred by the Pasteur Institute to a post in Vietnam, his position in Bombay was filled by Simond, who was to test the efficacy of an experimental antiserum against the outbreak of plague in that city.

The following year, Simond was in Karachi where, despite limited resources, he was able to demonstrate that fleas transmit the bacterium Yersinia pestis, the agent causing bubonic plague, from rat to rat, and from rat to human. His experiments are described in his report to the Pasteur Institute on the spread of plague ("La propagation de la peste"), which was published in 1898 by Pierre Paul Emile Roux in the Annales de l'Institut Pasteur. Simond describes that he collected a rat from a plague-infected area of town, added some fleas from a cat and placed it inside a large glass jar. When the rat was close to dying from the plague, another healthy rat was lowered into the jar, separated from the sick one by a wire mesh. This one died from the plague five days later.

For this work Simond was awarded the Barbier prize from the French Academy of Medicine. His findings were not initially accepted by the scientific community, but were validated later by others and by 1907 his conclusions were accepted as scientific fact.

A 2022 study of Simond's notebooks and correspondence found that his actual experiment involved three healthy rats, of which only one died from the plague; he did not report the two survivors. He further did not report that fleas were able to escape the jar. His report also fails to mention that he was aware of experiments by Japanese bacteriologist Ogata, who had shown one year earlier that squashed fleas from plague-infected rats could transmit the disease to other rats.

From 1898 to 1901 Simond served as director of the Pasteur Institute in Saigon organizing a modern vaccine service; he received the distinction of Knight of the Legion of Honour. From 1901 to 1905 he participated on a mission to study yellow fever in Brazil where he and his colleagues confirmed the results that the U.S. Army Commission led by Walter Reed had just obtained in Cuba. These revealed that the amaril virus is the pathogen present in the blood of patients, and that this virus can be conveyed to humans by the mosquito species, Stegomyia fasciata (later renamed Aedes aegypti). In 1908-09 he conducted yellow fever research in Martinique. From 1911 to 1913 he served as Director of the Imperial Bacteriology Research Institute in Constantinople. In 1917, Simond was installed in Valence to study tuberculosis.

Simond also had a keen interest in botany; during his stay as a colonial doctor in Indochina from 1914 until 1917, he collected orchids and had a local artist create watercolor paintings of them. He amassed a collection of 226 watercolor paintings of 3,226 different species of orchids which were presented to the Phanerogamie of the Muséum national d'histoire naturelle on 1947.

== Death ==
Simond died in Valence (Drôme, France) on 3 March 1947 at the age 88. After his death, a fellow biologist, René Dujarric de la Rivière, presented Simond's eulogy at the Academy of Medecine. There is a street in Valence named after him.
