= Canton of Approuague-Kaw =

Former canton of French Guiana, France

Coordinates: 4°18′45″N 52°08′10″W

- Former canton
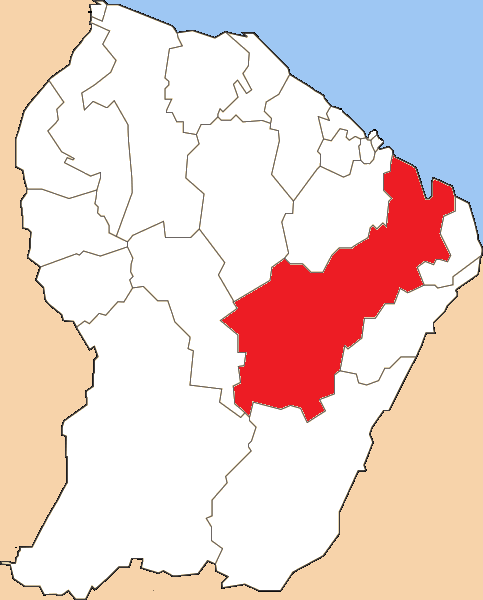
- Location of the Canton of Approuague-Kaw in the department of French Guiana
- Country: France
- Overseas region and department: French Guiana{{{region}}}
- No. of communes: {{{nbcomm}}}
- Disbanded: 31 December 2015
- Area: 12,130 km^{2} (4,680 sq mi)
- Population (2012): 934
  - Density: 0.0770/km^{2} (0.199/sq mi)

The canton of Approuague-Kaw (French: Canton d'Approuague-Kaw) is one of the former cantons of the Guyane department in French Guiana. It was located in the arrondissement of Cayenne. Its administrative seat was located in Régina, the canton's only commune. Its population was 934 in 2012.

== Administration ==
List of successive general councillors
In office		Name	Party
1955	1977	Maurice Léanville	Mouvement Populaire Guyanais
1977	1979	Raymond Libri	DVD then UDF
1979	2015	Pierre Désert	DVG
