= Pointe Isère =

Cape in French Guiana

Coordinates: 5.76084°N 53.88794°W

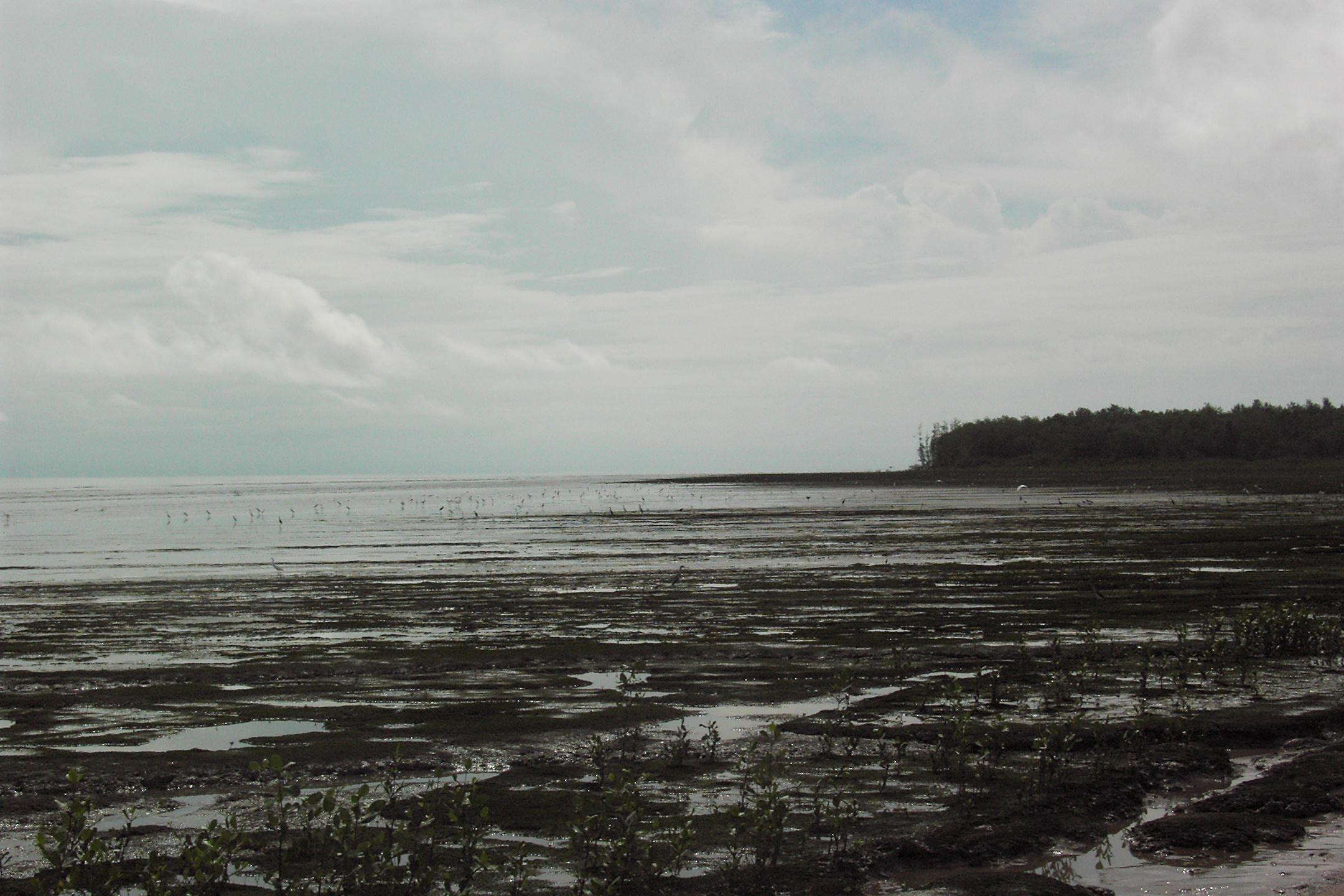
Pointe Isère (2011)

Pointe Isère is a cape in far north-west French Guiana in the commune of Awala-Yalimapo, lying on the banks of the Maroni River and bordering Suriname. Since 1998, Pointe Isère is a protected area within the Amana Nature Reserve
