= Communauté de communes =

France intercommunal subdivision combining smaller communes

A communauté de communes (French pronunciation: [kɔmynote də kɔmyn] 'community of communes') is a federation of municipalities (communes) in France. It forms a framework within which local tasks are carried out together. It is the least-integrated form of intercommunalité (intercommunality).

As of 1 January 2007, there were 2,400 communautés de communes in France (2,391 in metropolitan France and 9 in the overseas departments), with 26.48 million people living in them. Since then many communautés de communes have been merged or have joined a communauté d'agglomération, a communauté urbaine or a métropole. Whereas there were 2,409 communautés de communes in January 2010 and 1,842 in January 2016, there were only 989 communautés de communes left in January 2025. The population of the communautés de communes (2022 population data, 2025 borders) ranged from 106,433 inhabitants (Communauté de communes Le Grésivaudan, covering the area between Grenoble and Chambéry), to 3,986 inhabitants (Communauté de communes du Causse de Labastide-Murat, Lot department).

== Legal status ==
The communauté de communes was created by a statute of the French Parliament enacted on 6 February 1992. The statute was modified by the Chevènement law of 1999.

Unlike the communautés d'agglomération and the communautés urbaines, communautés de communes are not subject to a minimum threshold of population to come into existence. The only constraint is geographical continuity.

According to the Code général des collectivités territoriales (CGCT; general law over regional administrative structures), a communauté de communes is an établissement public de coopération intercommunale (EPCI; public establishment of inter-communal cooperation) formed by several French municipalities that cover a connected territory without enclave.

When the Chevènement law regulatory modifications came into force in 1999 communautés de communes already in existence that did not meet the criterion of geographical continuity were left untouched.

The communes involved build a space of solidarity with a joint project for development, infrastructure building, etc.

== Constitutional ==
The communautés de communes are currently funded by local taxes:

- tax on housing: taxe d'habitation
- taxes on buildings and lands: taxe foncière
- tax on businesses: taxe professionnelle

The taxe professionnelle unique is a modified version of the tax whereby a proportion of the monies levied by the communautés des communes is paid back to the individual communes. The taxe professionnelle is sometimes presented as an unfair burden on the economy or even as a device for exporting jobs outside France, and it has been subject to a series of reforms over the years but central government undertakings to abolish it (and presumably to replace it) have yet to come to fruition. If they do, funding of the communautés de communes will change fundamentally.

A communauté de communes is administered by a council (conseil communautaire) made up of delegates from the municipal councils of each member commune. The number of seats allocated to each commune reflects the size of the commune. A member commune must have at least one seat on the council and no individual commune may have more than half of the seats on the conseil communautaire.

== Objectives ==
Article 5214-16 of the CGCT requires the communauté de communes to exercise its responsibilities in the following policy areas:

- promotion of economic development across its entire territory
- management and maintenance of public spaces

The communauté de communes may also choose to exercise its responsibilities in at least one of the following six policy areas:

- environmental protection and improvement
- housing and 'quality-of-life' policies
- road construction, management and maintenance
- construction, maintenance and operation of buildings and other infrastructure for recreational (cultural and sports related) and educational (primary schooling and preschooling) purposes
- social actions for the common good
- general improvements (assainissement)

The communauté de communes may define its own personnel requirements and appoint appropriately qualified employees. In addition, and subject to départemental agreement, it may exercise direct powers and responsibilities in certain social policy areas that are more normally handled at the départemental level.

Subject to these requirements, it is for the communes themselves to determine precisely which responsibilities they will delegate to the communauté de communes based on their view of the individual commune's best interests. Once powers and responsibilities have been delegated to the communauté de communes, they shall be exercised collectively through the communauté de communes and may no longer be exercised independently by individual member communes.

== Communautés de communes with more than 60,000 inhabitants ==
Name	Seat	Department	Number of communes	Population (2022)
CC Auray Quiberon Terre Atlantique	Brech	Morbihan	24	93,474
CC Les Balcons du Dauphiné	Saint-Chef	Isère	47	80,464
CC Cœur d'Ostrevent	Lewarde	Nord	20	71,089
CC Entre Bièvre et Rhône	Saint-Maurice-l'Exil	Isère	37	71,155
CC Erdre et Gesvres	Grandchamps-des-Fontaines	Loire-Atlantique	12	69,332
CC Forez-Est	Feurs	Loire	42	66,011
CC Le Grésivaudan	Crolles	Isère	43	106,433
CC Haute Saintonge	Jonzac	Charente-Maritime	129	70,645
CC Maremne Adour Côte Sud	Saint-Vincent-de-Tyrosse	Landes	23	72,997
CC Ouest Guyanais	Mana	French Guiana	8	98,941
CC Pays d'Ancenis	Ancenis-Saint-Géréon	Loire-Atlantique	20	71,163
CC Pévèle-Carembault	Pont-à-Marcq	Nord	38	101,111
CC Plaine de l'Ain	Chazey-sur-Ain	Ain	53	84,625
CC Thelloise	Neuilly-en-Thelle	Oise	41	62,826
CC Val d'Essonne	Ballancourt-sur-Essonne	Essonne	21	63,778
CC Les Vals du Dauphiné	La Tour-du-Pin	Isère	36	66,070
