= Marguerite Jauzelon =

French teacher and volunteer paramedic (1917–2023)

- Born: Marguerite Thérèse Jauzelon; 25 July 1917; Ravine Creuse, Saint-André, Réunion, France
- Died: 10 February 2023 (aged 105)
- Education: Sisters of St. Joseph of Cluny
- Occupations: Teacher; Paramedic

Marguerite Thérèse Jauzelon (25 July 1917 – 10 February 2023) was a French teacher and volunteer paramedic during World War II.

== Biography ==
Born in Saint-André, Réunion on 25 July 1917, Jauzelon was the daughter of engineer Raymond Jauzelon. She was the fourth of six children. She grew up in Saint-André and was educated with the nuns of the Sisters of St. Joseph of Cluny. In 1930, her father was appointed deputy director of the Agence des sucreries coloniales to Réunion's capital, Saint-Denis. She continued her education at the École de Joinville before returning to Saint-André in 1936. Her father died in April 1943.

Jauzelon joined the French Liberation Army in North Africa in November 1943. Initially assigned to work as a secretary, she asserted herself into a role of an ambulance driver, having learned how to drive at the age of 14. In Oran, she was assigned to the 431st Colonial Medical Battalion in the 3rd Pickup Company, made up of 24 Malagasy and Réunionese paramedics. She was issued a Dodge ambulance as head driver and Fochette Duchesne as her teammate. They named the vehicle Hirondelle and headed for Ajaccio on 29 July 1944. The landing in Provence took place on 15 August 1944 and she disembarked at Cavalaire-sur-Mer. She then headed to Toulon, where she evacuated wounded Germans from Canon l'Inconnu.

Throughout the next several months, Jauzelon followed the advances of the Allied front lines, such as the Battle of the Vosges and the Battle of Colmar. In May 1945, at the German Instrument of Surrender, she was near Tübingen. The paramedics were demobilized in November 1945.

In 1946, Jauzelon returned to Réunion and resumed her work as a teacher. She was not recognized for her service in the war until 2002, when she was awarded a Knight of the Legion of Honour by a member of the French Resistance from Réunion, Jean Joly. She then gave testimony in schools and emphasized the values of courage, humanity, and fraternity. She reached the age of 100 in 2017 and was paid an official tribute.

Jauzelon died on 10 February 2023, at the age of 105.

== Decorations ==
- Knight of the Legion of Honour (2012)
- Officer of the Ordre des Palmes académiques
- Volunteer combatant's cross
- Combatant's Cross
- 1939–1945 Commemorative war medal

== Tributes ==
In January 2023, the Lycée de Bellepierre in Saint-Denis, Réunion was renamed the Lycée Marguerite Jauzelon.
