= Canton of Saint-Georges-de-l'Oyapock =

Former canton of French Guiana, France

- Former canton
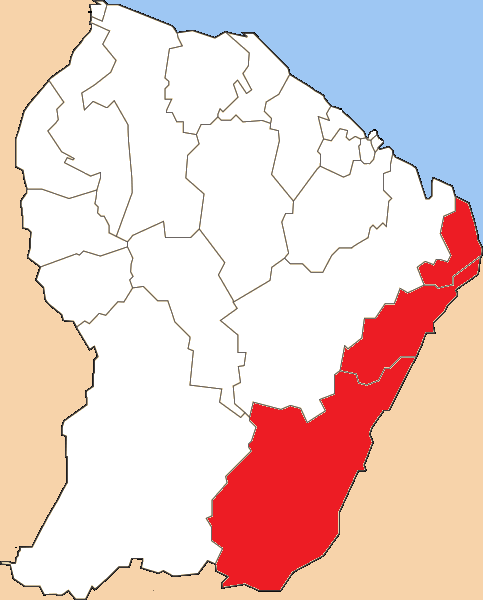
- Location of the Canton of Saint-Georges-de-l'Oyapock in French Guiana
- Country: France
- Overseas region and department: French Guiana{{{region}}}
- No. of communes: {{{nbcomm}}}
- Disbanded: 31 December 2015
- Area: 13,430 km^{2} (5,190 sq mi)
- Population (2012): 5,644
  - Density: 0.4203/km^{2} (1.088/sq mi)

The canton of Saint-Georges-de-l'Oyapock (French: Canton de Saint-Georges-de-l'Oyapock) is one of the former cantons of the Guyane department in French Guiana. It was located in the arrondissement of Cayenne, and consisted of three communes. Its administrative seat was located in Saint-Georges. Its population was 5,644 in 2012.

== Communes ==
The canton was composed of 3 communes:

- Saint-Georges
- Camopi
- Ouanary

== Administration ==
List of successive general councillors
Term		Name	Party	Notes
1955	1967	Henry Plénet	DVD	President of the General Council (1964–1967)
1967	1979	Yves Claire	DVD	
1979	1992	Guy Massel	RPR	
1992	1998	Georges Elfort	DVG	Vice-president of the General Council (1992–1998); Mayor of Saint-Georges (1994–2008)
1998	2004	Louis-Roland Bierge	DVD	Deputy Mayor of Saint-Georges
2004	2011	René-Amédée Gustave	PSG	Vice-president of the General Council
2011	2015	Louis-Roland Bierge	UMP	
