= Canton of Saint-Laurent-du-Maroni =

- Former canton
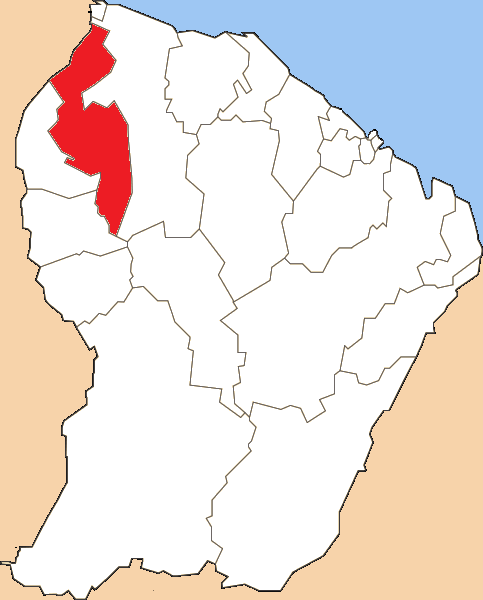
- Location of the canton of Saint-Laurent-du-Maroni in French Guiana
- Country: France
- Overseas region and department: French Guiana{{{region}}}
- No. of communes: {{{nbcomm}}}
- Disbanded: 31 December 2015
- Area: 4,830 km^{2} (1,860 sq mi)
- Population (2012): 40,597
  - Density: 8.41/km^{2} (21.8/sq mi)

The canton of Saint-Laurent-du-Maroni (French: Canton de Saint-Laurent-du-Maroni) is one of the former cantons of the Guyane department in French Guiana. It was located in the arrondissement of Saint-Laurent-du-Maroni. Its administrative seat was located in Saint-Laurent-du-Maroni, the canton's sole commune. Its population was 40,597 in 2012.

== Administration ==
List of successive general councillors
Term		Name	Party	Capacity	Ref.
1958	19..	Joseph Symphorien	UNR	Mayor of Saint-Laurent-du-Maroni (1950-1953)	
19..	1970	René Long	UDR	Mayor of Saint-Laurent-du-Maroni (1954-1971)	
1970	1982	Raymond Tarcy	PSG	Mayor of Saint-Laurent-du-Maroni (1971-1983) Senator (1980-1989)	
1982	1998 (resigned)	Léon Bertrand	RPR	Mayor of Saint-Laurent-du-Maroni (1983-2018) Deputy (1988-2002) Secretary of State then Minister (2002-2007)	
1998	2015	Marie-Thérèse Morel	RPR then UMP	Deputy mayor of Saint-Laurent-du-Maroni (1995-2001)	
