= Lucifer Dékou-Dékou Biological Reserve =

Wilderness area in French Guiana

- IUCN category Ib (wilderness area)
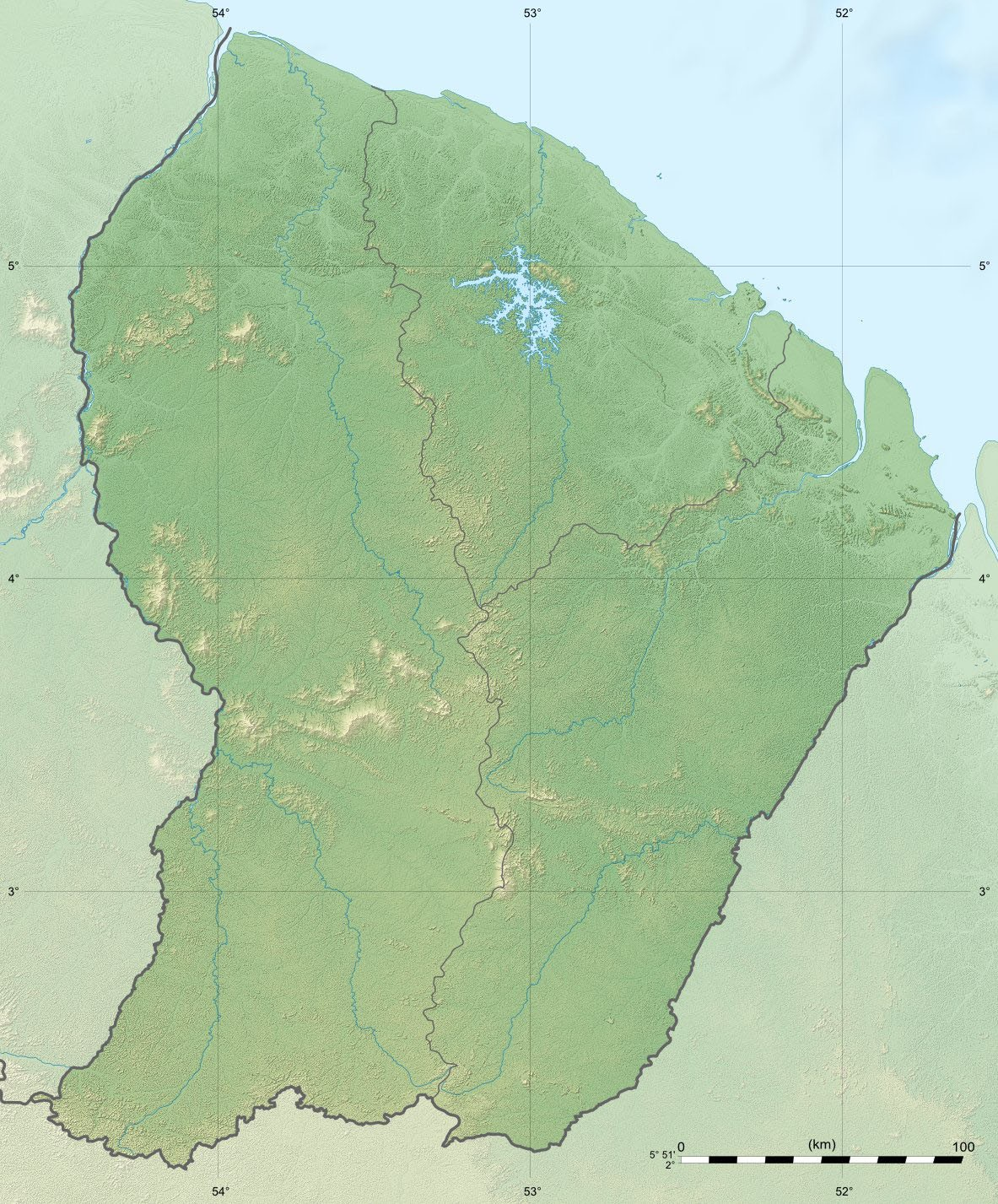
- Location within French Guiana
- Location: French Guiana, France
- Nearest city: Saint-Laurent-du-Maroni
- Coordinates: 4.6450°N 53.9375°W
- Area: 643.73 km^{2} (248.55 sq mi)
- Established: 11 December 1995
- Governing body: National Forests Office

The Lucifer Dékou-Dékou Biological Reserve (French: Réserve biologique intégrale de Lucifer Dékou Dékou) is a wilderness area in French Guiana, France. The reserve is located in the communes of Apatou and Saint-Laurent-du-Maroni. It is the largest wilderness area of France, and consists of two separate parts, two mountain ranges covered in tropical rainforest; to the north are the Lucifer Mountains, to the south are the Dékou-Dékou Mountains. Controversially, the Montagne d'Or mine, the biggest mining project in France, is located in between the two ranges.

== Overview ==
The Dékou-Dékou Mountains form an east–west ridge consisting of two plateaus separated by a little hill. The mountains rises to 565 metres (1,854 ft). The northern side is a moderate slope with numerous ravines. The southern side is a steep drop. The forests on the slopes are interrupted by bamboo and grass plains.

The Lucifer Mountains rise to more than 500 metres (1,600 ft), and form a vast plateau covered in forests which are home to many rare species.

The wilderness area is home to a great variety of birds. 272 species have been identified and include the golden-olive woodpecker, the white bellbird and the blue-backed tanager. Two endemic species to the Guiana Shield are the sharpbill and the sooty-headed tyrannulet.

On 27 July 2012, Lucifer Dékou-Dékou became a protected area.

== Gold mining ==
The Montage d'Or mine located between the wilderness area marked in cyan

Gold mining in the area started in 1875 when Paul Isnard discovered gold. Between 1996 and 1999, Columbus Gold, as of 2020 known as Orea Mining Corporation, started to explore the area.

Montagne d'Or mine, a massive gold mining project covering 190 square kilometres (73 sq mi) was developed, and is the biggest mining project in France. The project is considered controversial, and has resulted in protests by environmental groups. Emmanuel Macron distanced himself from the project in 2019, however the battle has moved to the courts, and is as of February 2021 ongoing. The debate about whether the project can continue, has attracted garimpeiros, illegal gold miners, to the area.

== See also ==
- Voltaire Falls, which is located near the wilderness area
