= Canton of Macouria =

- Former canton
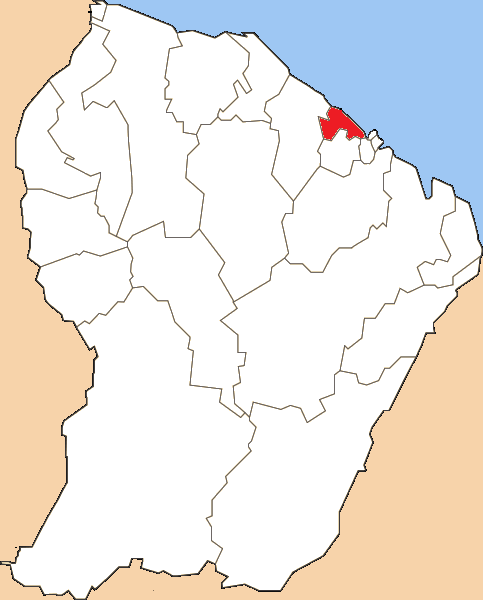
- Location of the Canton of Macouria in French Guiana
- Country: France
- Overseas region and department: French Guiana{{{region}}}
- No. of communes: {{{nbcomm}}}
- Disbanded: 31 December 2015
- Area: 378 km^{2} (146 sq mi)
- Population (2012): 10,358
  - Density: 27.4/km^{2} (71.0/sq mi)

The canton of Macouria (French: Canton de Macouria) was one of the former cantons of the Guyane department in French Guiana. Located in the arrondissement of Cayenne, its administrative seat was located in Macouria, the only commune in the canton. The canton had a population of 10,358 in 2012. The canton was abolished on 31 December 2015 as part of the territorial reorganisation of French Guiana.

== Name ==
The name Macouria is believed to be a corruption of the name "Mécouya", after an Amerindian chief of a Galibi tribe who inhabited the area in the 17th century.

== History ==
The territory of the canton of Macouria was originally settled by the Palikur Amerindians. The first recorded European expedition to the area occurred in 1604, led by Daniel de La Touche de La Ravardière. Decades later, in 1643, Governor Charles Poncet de Brétigny arrived in the region alongside the Compagnie du Cap Nord.

Religious and economic development accelerated in the early 18th century when the Jesuits arrived to evangelise the Amerindian population in 1709. Around 1710, the Jesuits constructed the parish of Saint Joseph at Pointe Liberté to advance their missionary work. Through the cultivation of prosperous and abundant crops, specifically coffee, cacao, and annatto, the Jesuits acted as pioneers and drove the early development of the Macouria district.

During the French penal colony era, established by decree in 1851, Macouria hosted two deportation camp]s, integrating the area into the broader system of forced labour and transportation that characterized French Guiana's colonial administration. The area functioned initially as a rural extension of the coastal centre Cayenne, focused on limited agriculture amid challenging tropical conditions and sparse infrastructure.

The canton later functioned as an administrative division of the Guyane department within the arrondissement of Cayenne and included Macouria as its only commune.

As part of the territorial reorganisation of French Guiana, the cantons of the department were abolished on 31 December 2015 following the implementation of Law No. 2011-884 of 27 July 2011, which created the territorial collective of French Guiana. The territory of the former canton became part of the new electoral sections established under the reorganisation.

== Demographics ==
According to the Institut national de la statistique et des études économiques (INSEE), the canton of Macouria had a population of 10,358 in 2012.

== Administration ==
List of successive general councillors
In office		Name	Party	Notes
1951	19..	Benjamin Constance	RS	
19..	1964	Léopold Héder	SFIO	Deputy (1962–1967)
1964	1970	Benjamin Constance	DVD	
1970	1982	Yves-Paul Robo	DVD	Mayor of Macouria (1971–1977)
1982	2012 (deceased)	Serge Adelson	DVG	Mayor of Macouria (1983–2012)
2012	2015	Jocelyne Pruykemaker	DVD	Deputy Mayor of Macouria
