= Canton of Roura =

- Former canton
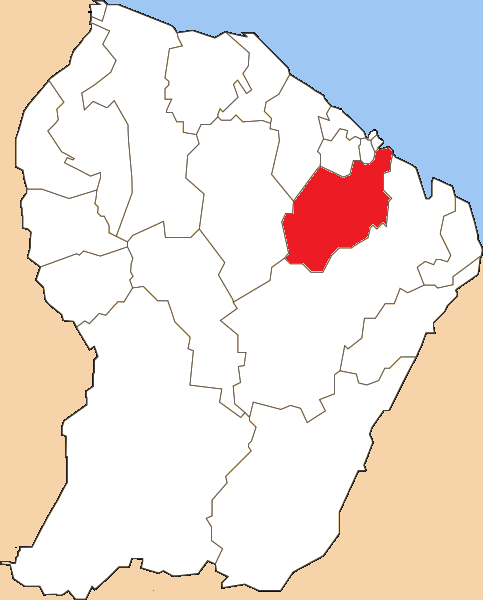
- Location of the canton of Roura in French Guiana
- Country: France
- Overseas region and department: French Guiana{{{region}}}
- No. of communes: {{{nbcomm}}}
- Disbanded: 31 December 2015
- Area: 3,902.50 km^{2} (1,506.76 sq mi)
- Population (2012): 3,050
  - Density: 0.782/km^{2} (2.02/sq mi)

The canton of Roura (French: Canton de Roura) is one of the former cantons of the Guyane department in French Guiana. It was located in the arrondissement of Cayenne. Its administrative seat was located in Roura, the canton's sole commune. Its population was 3,050 in 2012.

== Administration ==
List of successive general councillors
Term		Name	Party	Notes
1955	1961	M. Aron	PSG	
1961	196.	Antoinette Léveillé	UNR	
196.	1967	Gabriel Léveillé	UNR	Mayor of Roura
1967	1997 (resigned)	Claude Ho-A-Chuck	DVG then DVD then UDF	President of the General Council (1973-1979) Mayor of Roura (1971-1997)
1997	1998	Raoul Roura	Independent	
1998	2011	Claude Polony	RPR then UMP	Mayor of Roura (2001-2008)
2011	2015	David Riché	DVG	Substitute Deputy (2007-2012) Mayor of Roura (2008-present)
