= Canton of Maripasoula =

- Former canton
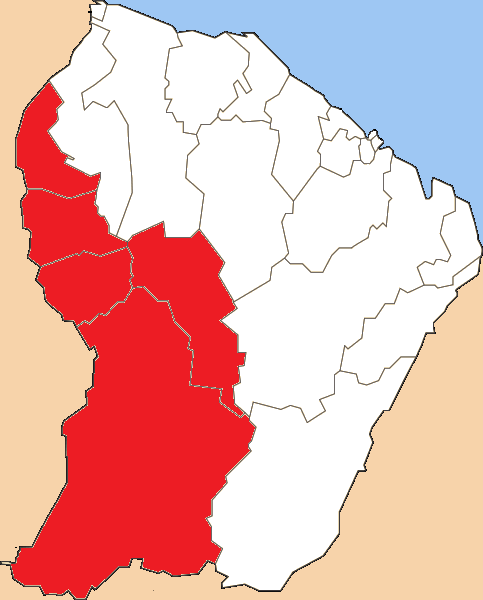
- Location of the canton of Maripasoula in French Guiana
- Country: France
- Overseas region and department: French Guiana{{{region}}}
- No. of communes: {{{nbcomm}}}
- Disbanded: 31 December 2015
- Area: 29,606 km^{2} (11,431 sq mi)
- Population (2012): 29,504
  - Density: 0.99655/km^{2} (2.5811/sq mi)

The canton of Maripasoula (French: Canton de Maripasoula) is one of the former cantons of the Guyane department in French Guiana. It was located in the arrondissement of Saint-Laurent-du-Maroni and consisted of five communes. Its administrative seat was located in Maripasoula. Its population was 29,504 in 2012.

It was the largest canton by geographic area, comparable in size to the metropolitan region of Auvergne or the country of Belgium. In addition to other cantons of French Guiana, it shared borders with both Suriname and Brazil.

== Communes ==
The canton was composed of 5 communes:

- Maripasoula
- Apatou
- Grand-Santi
- Papaichton
- Saül

== Administration ==
List of successive general councillors
Term		Name	Party	Notes
1967	1985	Paul Jean-Louis	UDR then RPR	
1985	1998	Antoine Abienso	PSG	Mayor of Maripasoula (1989-1996)
1998	2004	Gérard Amayota	DVD then UMP	Teacher Mayor of Apatou (2001-2008)
2004	2011	Jocelyn Agelas	DVD	Deputy mayor of Maripasoula
2011	2015	Claude Djani	PSG	
