= Canton of Matoury =

- Former canton
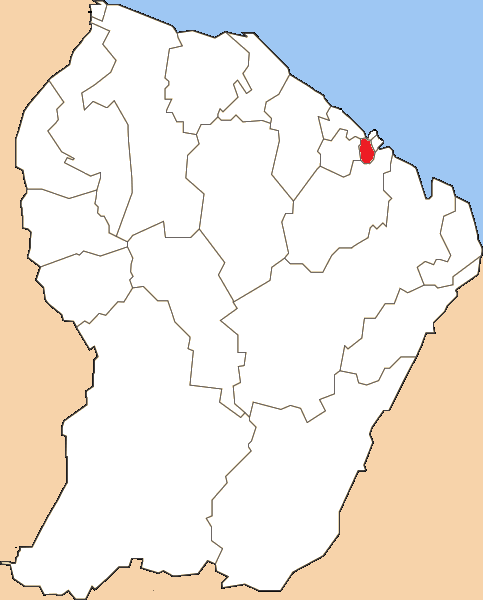
- Location of the canton of Matoury in French Guiana
- Country: France
- Overseas region and department: French Guiana{{{region}}}
- No. of communes: {{{nbcomm}}}
- Disbanded: 31 December 2015
- Area: 137.20 km^{2} (52.97 sq mi)
- Population (2012): 29,712
  - Density: 216.56/km^{2} (560.89/sq mi)

The canton of Matoury (French: Canton de Matoury) is one of the former cantons of the Guyane department in French Guiana. It was located in the arrondissement of Cayenne. Its administrative seat was located in Matoury, the canton's sole commune. Its population was 29,712 in 2012.

== Administration ==
List of successive general councillors
Term		Name	Party	Notes
1982	1988	Etienne-Yves Barrat	PSG	
1988	2015	Jean-Pierre Roumillac	DVG then UMP	Mayor of Matoury (1989-2014)
