= Arrondissement of Cayenne =

Cayenne
- Arrondissement
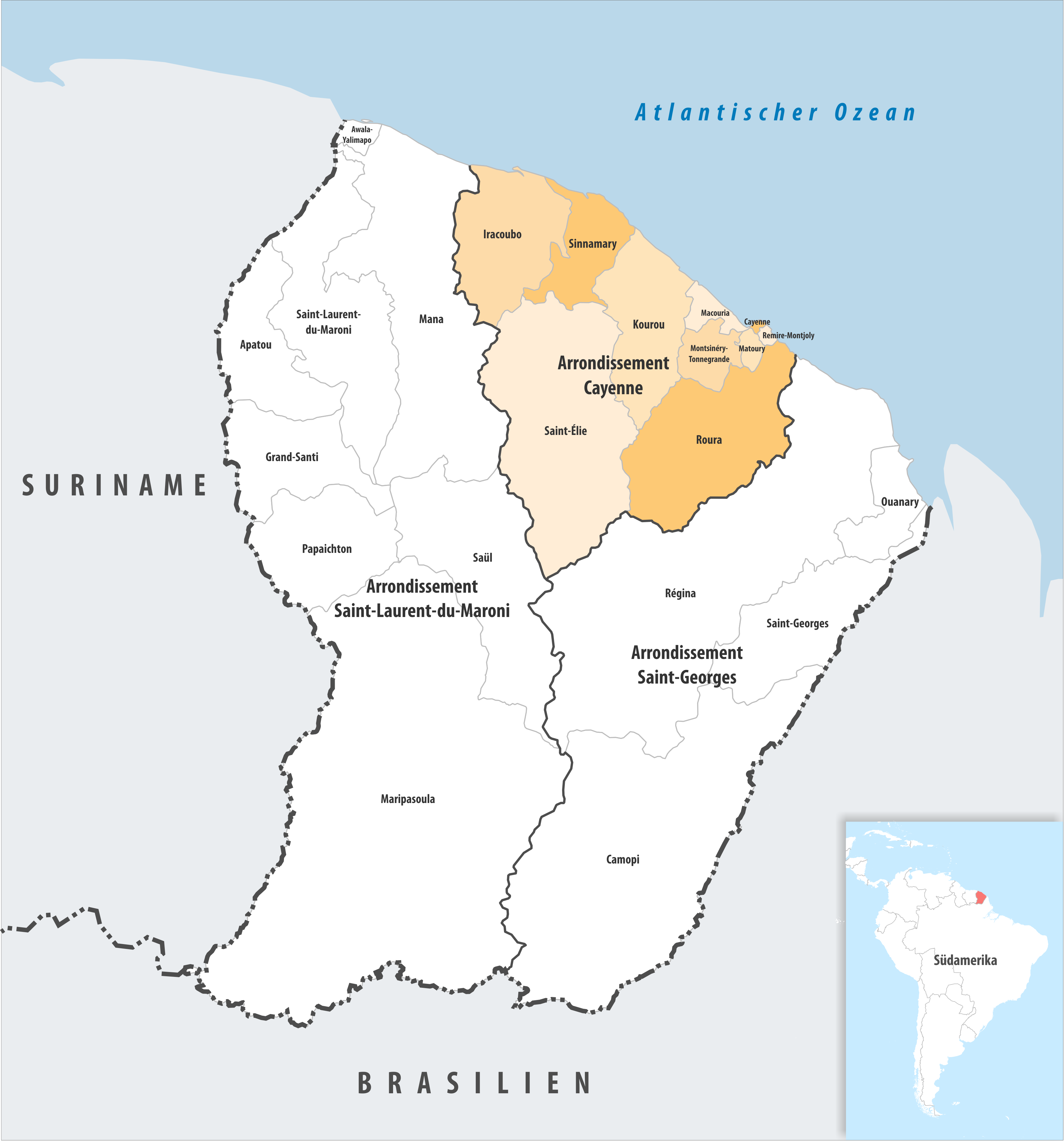
- Location within French Guiana
- Coordinates: 4°55′N 52°19′W
- Country: France
- Overseas region and department: French Guiana{{{region}}}
- No. of communes: {{{nbcomm}}}
- Area: 17,029 km^{2} (6,575 sq mi)
- Population (2023): 183,285
  - Density: 10.763/km^{2} (27.876/sq mi)
- INSEE code: 9731

The arrondissement of Cayenne is an arrondissement of France located in the French Guiana department and region. Established in 1947, the arrondissement spans 17,029 square kilometers and contains ten communes, having historically been subdivided into 16 cantons. As of the 2023 official estimate, it had a population of 183,285, making it the smallest of the three arrondissements in French Guiana, but also its most populated.

== Composition ==
The communes of the arrondissement of Cayenne, and their INSEE codes, are:

1. Cayenne (97302)
2. Iracoubo (97303)
3. Kourou (97304)
4. Macouria (97305)
5. Matoury (97307)
6. Montsinéry-Tonnegrande (97313)
7. Remire-Montjoly (97309)
8. Roura (97310)
9. Saint-Élie (97358)
10. Sinnamary (97312)

== History ==
The arrondissement of Cayenne, containing the coastal strip of French Guiana, was established in 1947. In 1969 the arrondissement of Inini, which covered the inland territory of French Guiana, was disbanded, and the territory of French Guiana was divided between the arrondissement of Cayenne and the new arrondissement of Saint-Laurent-du-Maroni.

Before 2015, the arrondissements of French Guiana were subdivided into cantons. The arrondissement of Cayenne were was divided into 16 cantons:

- Approuague-Kaw
- Cayenne 1st Canton Nord-Ouest
- Cayenne 2nd Canton Nord-Est
- Cayenne 3rd Canton Sud-Ouest
- Cayenne 4th Canton Centre
- Cayenne 5th Canton Sud
- Cayenne 6th Canton Sud-Est
- Iracoubo
- Kourou
- Macouria
- Matoury
- Montsinéry-Tonnegrande
- Rémiré-Montjoly
- Roura
- Saint-Georges-de-l'Oyapock
- Sinnamary

A government decree of 26 October 2022 detached the four communes of Saint-Georges, Camopi, Ouanary, and Régina from the arrondissement of Cayenne to form the new arrondissement of Saint-Georges.

== Demographics ==
According to official data from the institut national de la statistique et des études économiques (INSEE), the population of the arrondissement of Cayenne has grown over several decades. In 1982, the census recorded 59,246 inhabitants, a figure that rose to 85,808 by the 1990 census and further increased to 115,618 by the 1999 census. This upward trajectory continued into the 21st century with official population estimates recording 145,607 residents in 2007, which grew to 163,073 residents by 2015. By 2023, the official estimate placed the population of the arrondissement at 183,285 inhabitants. This represents an annual population growth rate of 1.47% between 2015 and 2023. With a total land area of 17,029 square kilometers, the arrondissement of Cayenne had a population density of 10.76 inhabitants per square kilometer in 2023. In the context of French Guiana as a whole, the arrondissement holds a major share of the region's population relative to its size. While its territory accounts for just 20.39% of French Guiana's total area, its population comprises 62.34% of the total population.
