= Paul Isnard =

- Gold mine and village
- Location in French Guiana
- Coordinates: 04°46′42″N 54°00′30″W
- Country: France
- Overseas region: French Guiana
- Arrondissement: Saint-Laurent-du-Maroni
- Commune: Saint-Laurent-du-Maroni

Paul Isnard is a mining concession in French Guiana, named after a gold miner.

== History ==
Paul Isnard discovered gold in the area in 1875. The Paul Isnard mine was initially explored by CMPI. Paul Isnard is, as of 2012, part of the Montagne d'Or mine together with three other mines, and is being exploited by Orea Mining Corporation, a Canadian mining company.

During the penitentiary era, many former prisoners had to serve the same amount of time as free men as their original sentence (called "doublage", "double up" in French) but were forbidden to leave French Guiana. Many went to the rain forest to find gold. They worked manually using mercury.

At the end of the 19th century Paul Isnard and other share holders brought a huge engine system to the mine as spare parts on horseback and foot. This machine is still there in the jungle between Citron and the airstrip.

Mercury became ubiquitous and reached higher concentrations in ore than needed to make "amalgam" (mix of gold and mercury), a sign of intense activity in the past. Ore concentrations declined to a few grams per metric.
