= Amana Nature Reserve =

Protected area in French Guiana

- IUCN category IV (habitat/species management area)
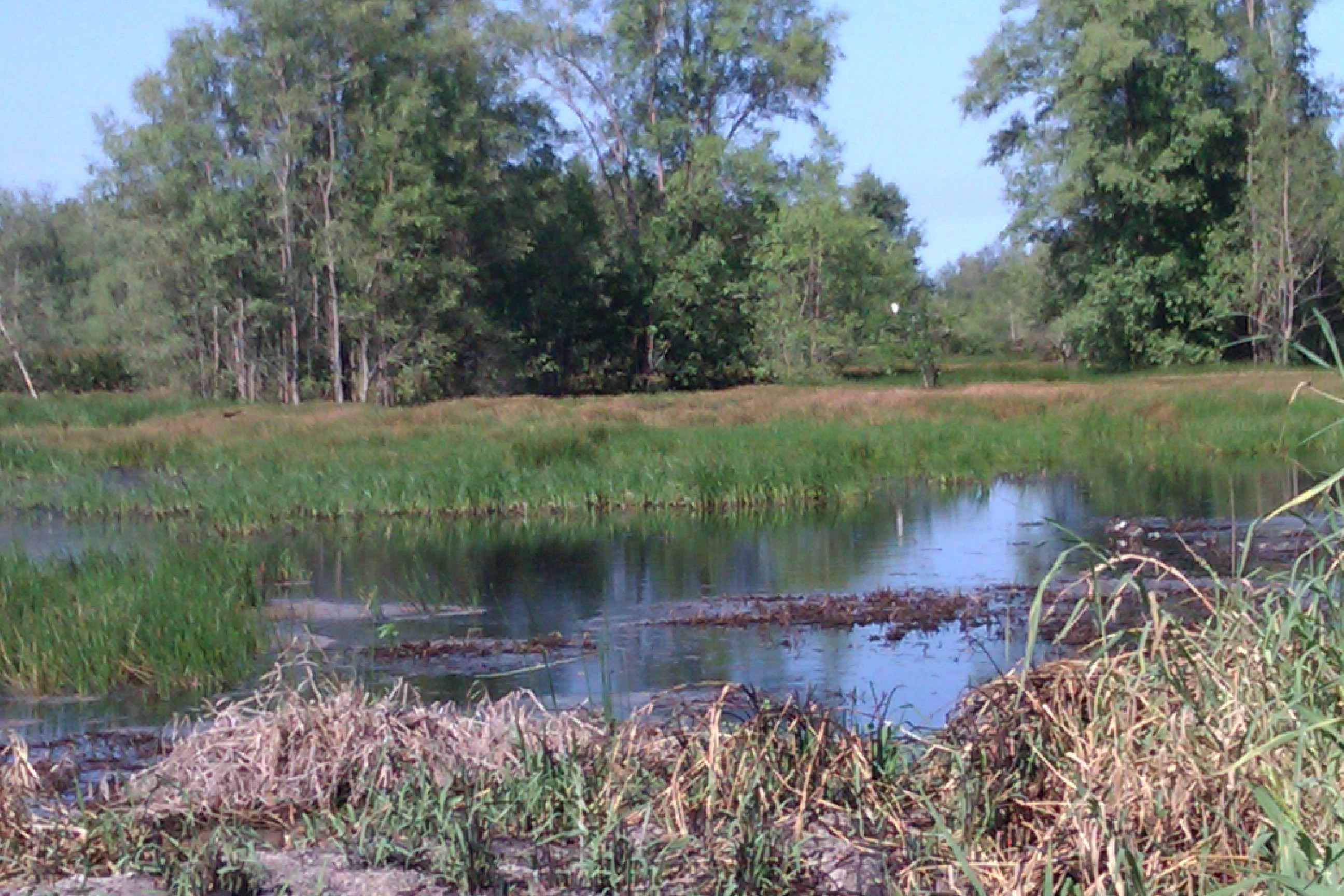

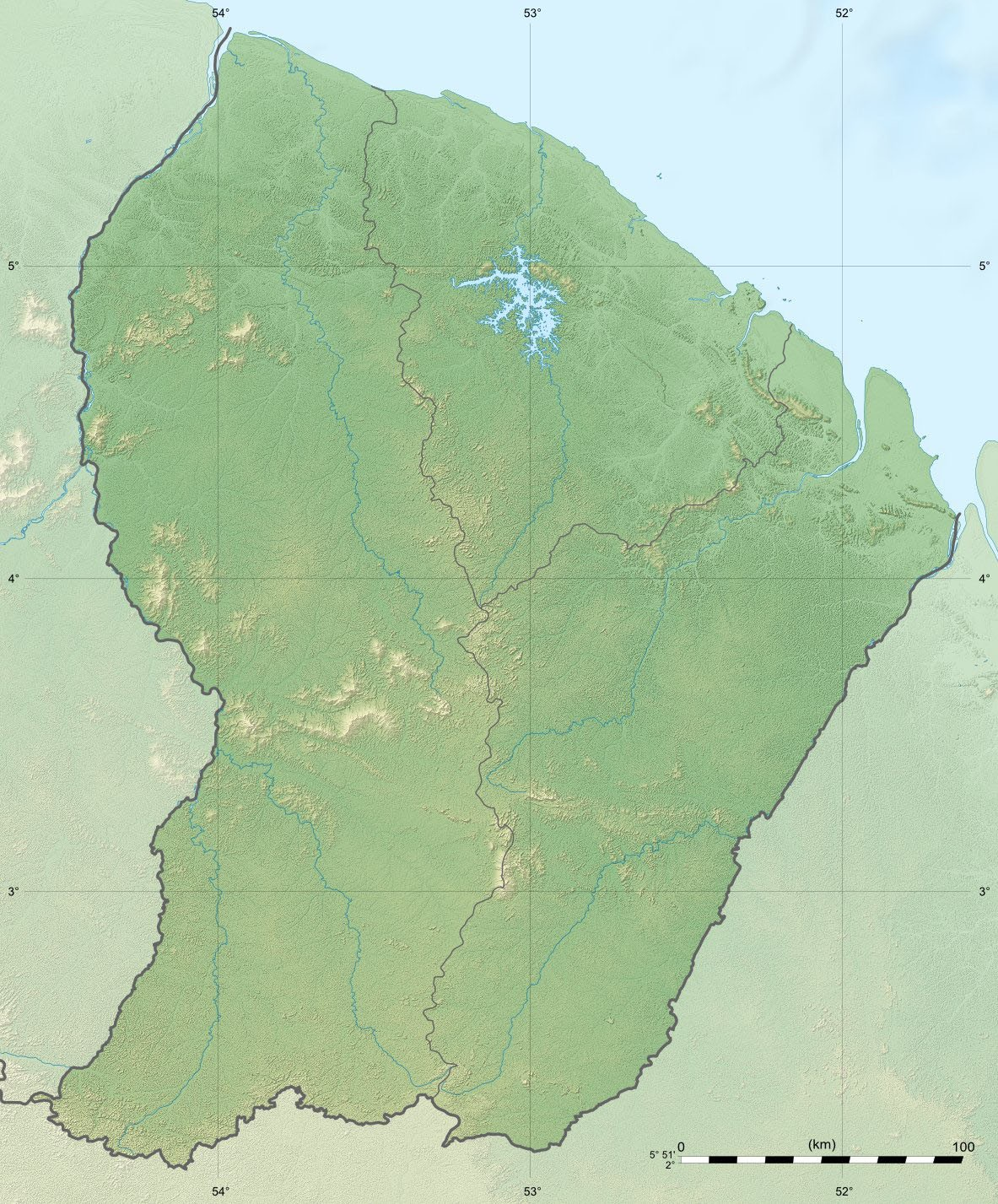
- Location within French Guiana
- Location: French Guiana, France
- Nearest city: Awala-Yalimapo
- Coordinates: 5.7417°N 53.8927°W
- Area: 148 km^{2} (57 sq mi)
- Established: 13 March 1998
- Governing body: Regional Natural Park of French Guiana
- Website: Reserves-Naturelles.org (in French)

The Amana Nature Reserve (French: Réserve naturelle nationale de l'Amana) is a nature reserve in French Guiana, France. It has been protected because it is one of the world's largest leatherback sea turtle nesting sites. It is part of the communes of Awala-Yalimapo and Mana.

== Environment ==
The nature reserve stretches from the Maroni to the Organobo River. The reserve consists of beaches, mangrove forests, swamps and savannas.

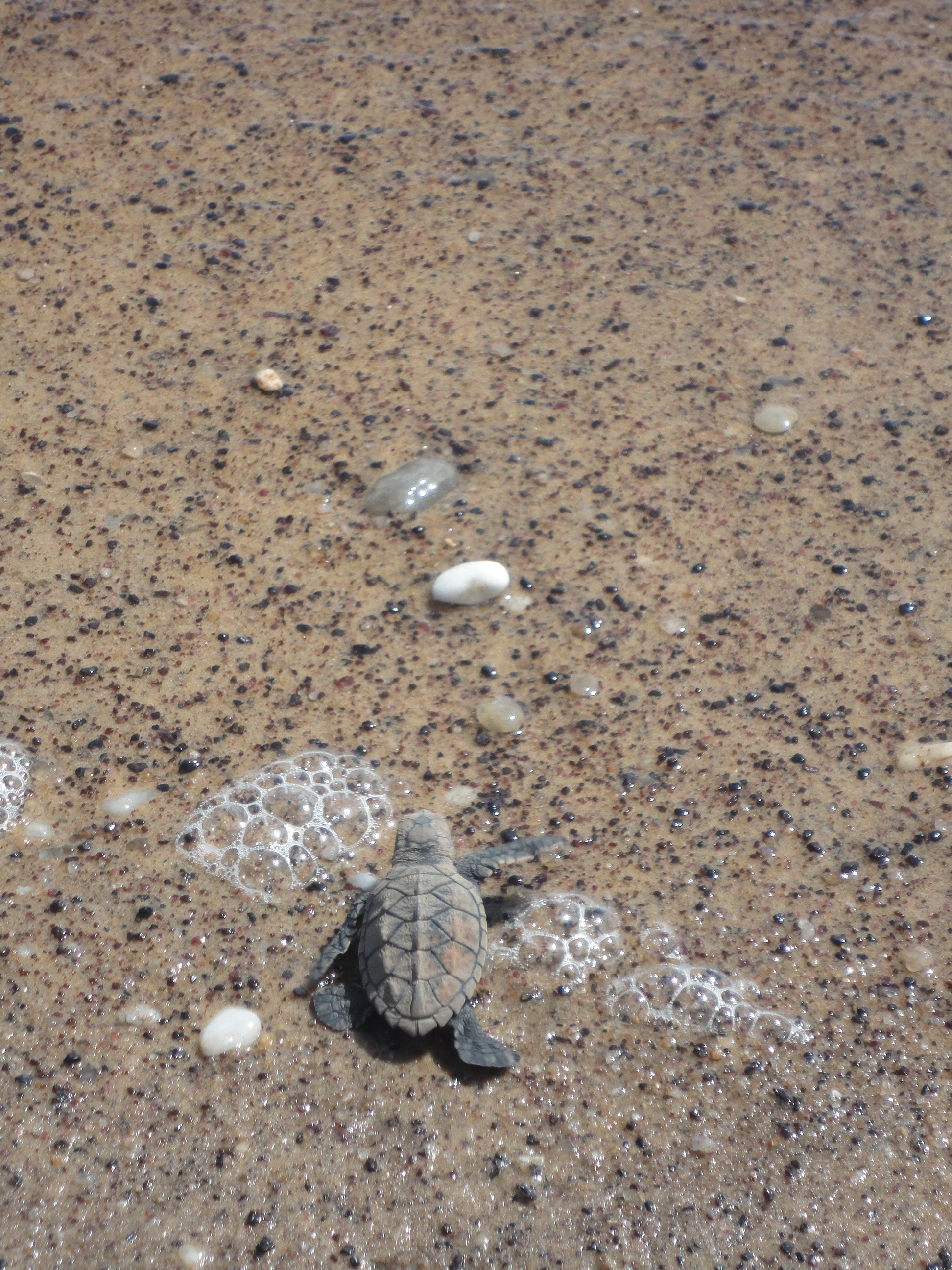
Baby turtle

=== Turtles ===
Leatherback sea turtles need very specific nesting beaches, and return to the same beach every two to three years. It is a vulnerable species with a limited number of suitable beaches. The neighbouring Wia Wia Nature Reserve in Suriname was used by the turtles as well until the beach shifted resulting in the disappearance of the turtles.

The beaches at Amana were home to 5,029 to 63,294 nests between 1967 and 2005. The turtles lay their eggs between March and July, digging a hole in the sand in which they lay 80 to 90 eggs. The hole is located between the high-water mark and the vegetation. The baby turtles emerge about two months later.

Other turtles nesting on the beach are the green, olive ridley and, occasionally, hawksbill sea turtles.

=== Birds ===
The reserve has been designated an Important Bird Area (IBA) by BirdLife International because it supports significant populations of many birds, especially migratory waders and other waterbirds, among 319 species recorded.
