= Beaufort-sur-Gervanne =

- Commune
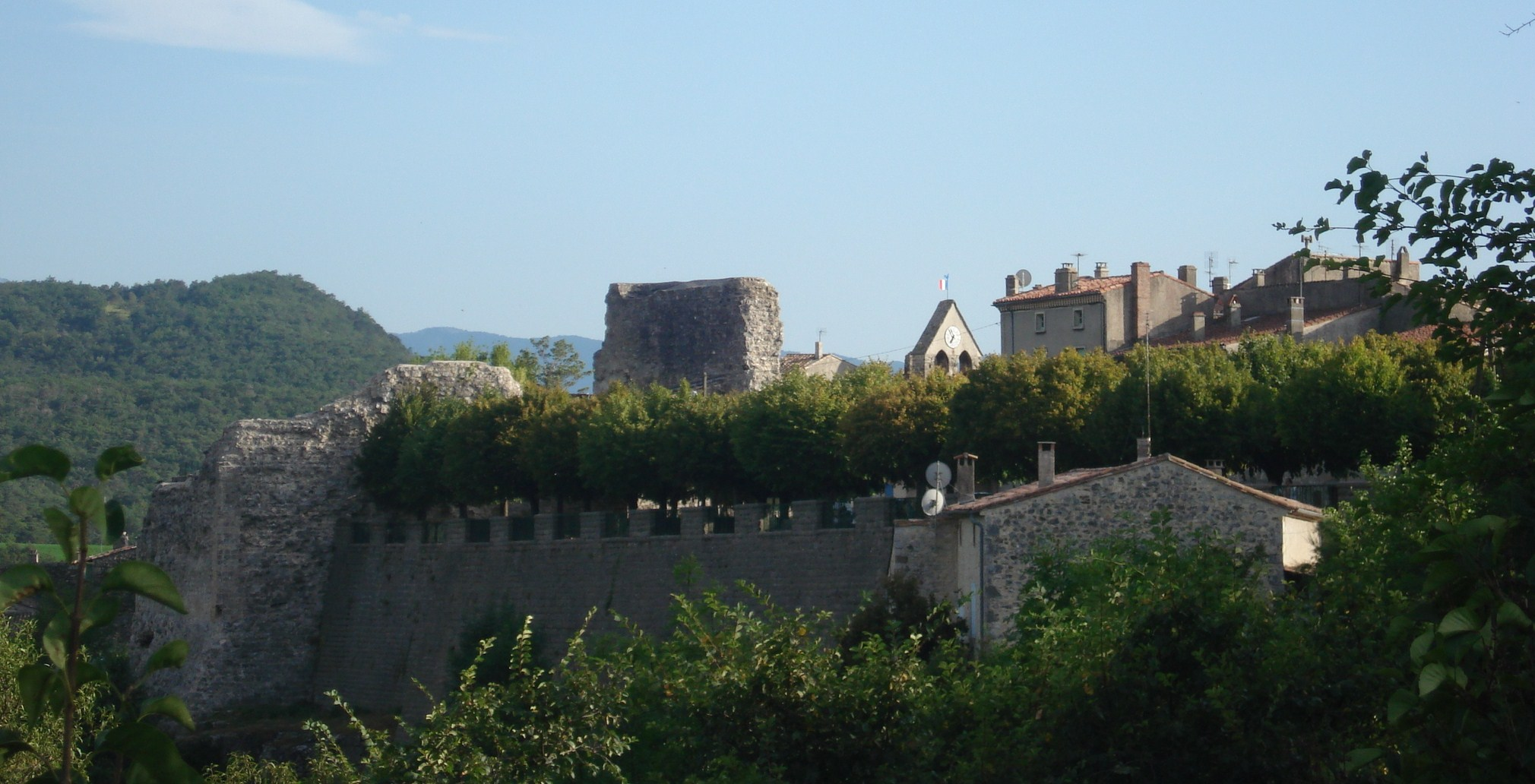
- A general view of Beaufort-sur-Gervanne
- Location of Beaufort-sur-Gervanne
- Location within France Location within Auvergne-Rhône-Alpes
- Coordinates: 44°46′44″N 5°08′36″E
- Country: France
- Region: Auvergne-Rhône-Alpes
- Department: Drôme
- Arrondissement: Die
- Canton: Crest
- Intercommunality: Val de Drôme en Biovallée

Government
  - Mayor (2020–2026): Gérard Gagnier
- Area^{1}: 9.48 km^{2} (3.66 sq mi)
- Highest elevation: 836 m (2,743 ft)
- Lowest elevation: 280 m (920 ft)
- Population (2023): 494
  - Density: 52.1/km^{2} (135/sq mi)
- Time zone: UTC+01:00 (CET)
  - Summer (DST): UTC+02:00 (CEST)
- INSEE/Postal code: 26035 /26400
- ^{1} French Land Register data, which excludes lakes, ponds, glaciers > 1 km^{2} (0.386 sq mi or 247 acres) and river estuaries.

Beaufort-sur-Gervanne (French pronunciation: [bofɔʁ syʁ ʒɛʁvan]; Vivaro-Alpine: Beufòrt de Gervana) is a commune in the Drôme department in southeastern France.

== Population ==
Historical population
Year	Pop.	±% p.a.
1968	276	—
1975	267	−0.47%
1982	253	−0.77%
1990	253	+0.00%
1999	312	+2.36%
2007	380	+2.50%
2012	441	+3.02%
2017	471	+1.32%
2023	494	+0.80%
Source: INSEE

== See also ==
- Communes of the Drôme department
- Parc naturel régional du Vercors
