= Presidents of the General Council of French Guiana =

The president of the General Council of French Guiana (French: Présidents du conseil général de la Guyane) presides over the nineteen seat General Council of French Guiana.

== List of presidents of the General Council ==
President	Dates in office	Political party	Notes
Eugène Gober	1913–1919		Mayor of Cayenne (1912–1928)
Eugène Gober	1922–1928		
Georges Anquetil	1928		
Ernest Prévot	1931		Mayor of Cayenne (1929–1935)
Simon Brasse	1932		
Albert Darnal	1933–1940		
Albert Darnal	1943–1944		
Renotte Robo	1945		Mayor of Macouria (19-1959)
Vermont Polycarpe	1945–1948		
Auguste Boudinot	1948–1955		Mayor of Cayenne (1947–1953)
Eudoxie Vérin	1955–1956		
Roland Barrat	1956–1958		Mayor of Cayenne (1953–1965)
Jean Symphorien	1958–1964		
Henry Plenet	1964–1967		
Jules Harmois	1967–1970		
Léopold Héder	1970–1973	PSG	Mayor of Cayenne (1965–1978)
Claude Ho-A-Chuck	1973–1979	DVG; DVD; UDF	Maire de Roura
Elie Castor	1979–1982	App. PS	
Emmanuel Bellony	1982–1985	RPR	
Elie Castor	1985–1994	App. PS	
Stéphan Phinéra-Horth	1994–1998	PSG	
André Lecante	1998–2001	DVG	
Joseph Ho-Ten-You	2001–2004	DVG	
Pierre Désert	2004–2008	DVG	
Alain Tien-Liong	2008–present	DVG	
