= Communauté de communes de l'Ouest guyanais =

Comm. de communes de l'Ouest guyanais
- Communauté de communes
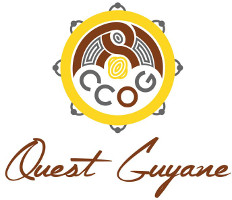

- Country: France
- Overseas region and department: French Guiana{{{region}}}
- No. of communes: {{{nbcomm}}}
- Established: 1 January 1995

Government
  - President (2020–2026): Sophie Charles (DVD)
- Area: 40,945 km^{2} (15,809 sq mi)
- Population (2018): 94,677
  - Density: 2.3123/km^{2} (5.9888/sq mi)
- Website: ouestguyane.fr

The Communauté de communes de l'Ouest guyanais (CCOG) is a communauté de communes, an intercommunal structure in the French département d'outre-mer of French Guiana. It was created in 1995, and its seat is Mana. Its area is 40,945 km^{2}, and its population was 94,677 in 2018.

== Composition ==
The CCOG is composed of the eight westernmost communes of French Guiana:

List of communes of the Communauté de communes de l'Ouest guyanais
Name	INSEE code	Demonym	Area (km^{2})	Population (2017)	Density (per km^{2})
Mana (Seat)	97306	Mananais	6,332.6	10,894	1.7
Apatou	97360		2,020	9,241	4.6
Awala-Yalimapo	97361		187.4	1,411	7.5
Grand-Santi	97357		2,123	7,918	3.7
Papaichton	97362		2,628	6,668	2.5
Maripasoula	97353	Maripasouliens	18,360	13,227	0.72
Saint-Laurent-du-Maroni	97311	Saint-Laurentins	4,830	42,612	8.8
Saül	97352		4,475	152	0.03

== Administration ==
The communauté de communes is led by an indirectly elected President along with a bureau communautaire composed of 9 Vice-Presidents. The president and vice-presidents are chosen by the conseil communautaire of the CCOG composed of 31 communal delegates.

=== President ===
List of presidents of the Communauté de communes de l'Ouest guyanais
In office		Name	Party	Capacity	Ref.
1995	2018	Georges Patient	DVG	Mayor of Mana (1989–2017)	
2001	2018	Léon Bertrand	RPR then UMP	Maire de Saint-Laurent-du-Maroni (1983–2018)	
2018	present	Sophie Charles	DVD	Maire de Saint-Laurent-du-Maroni (2018–present)	

=== Elected members ===
The Communauté de communes de l'Ouest guyanais is governed by an elected council composed of 31 councillors from each of its 8 communes. The number of council seats each commune receives is proportional based upon their population as follows:

- 13 delegates for Saint-Laurent-du-Maroni
- 4 delegates for each of Mana and Maripasoula
- 3 delegates for each of Grand-Santi and Apatou
- 2 delegates for Papaichton
- 1 delegate for each of Awala-Yalimapo and Saül

=== Administrative seat ===
The administrative seat of the Communauté de communes de l'Ouest guyanais is located in Mana at 2 rue Bruno Aubert.
