= Alain Tien-Liong =

French Guianan politician

Alain Tien-Liong (born 21 May 1963) is a French Guianese politician and educator.

== Biography ==
Tien-Liong was born on 21 May 1963 in Cayenne Tien-Liong was raised in Cayenne's village chinois.

== Political career ==
Councillor of the Canton of Cayenne-southwest from 1998, Vice President of the General Council from 1998 to 2004, he is currently President of the General Council of French Guiana (French Department Overseas and French overseas region). He is sympathetic to the MDES (Decolonization and Social Emancipation Movement), Guyanese Independence Party.
