= Mana (French Guiana) =

River in French Guiana

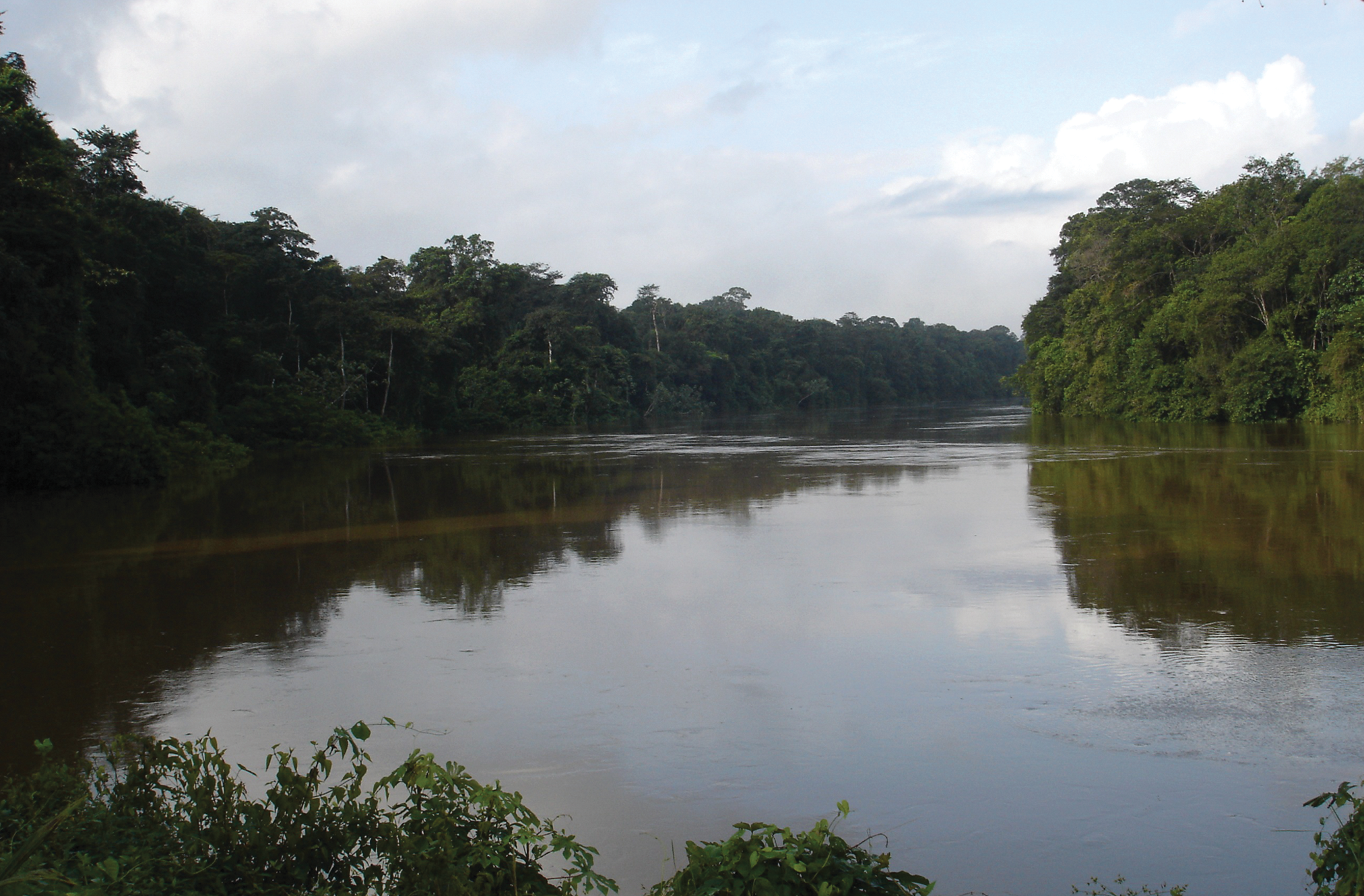

Location
- Country: France
- Region: French Guiana

Physical characteristics
- Source: Mount Galbao
  - location: 3.6175°N 53.2825°W
- Mouth: Atlantic Ocean
  - location: Mana
  - coordinates: 5.7289°N 53.8381°W
- Length: 462 km (287 mi)

The Mana (French pronunciation: [mana]) is a river in western French Guiana. It runs north from central French Guiana to the town of Mana, where it flows into the Atlantic Ocean. It is 462 km (287 mi) long.
