= Awala-Yalimapo =

Commune in French Guiana, France

- Commune
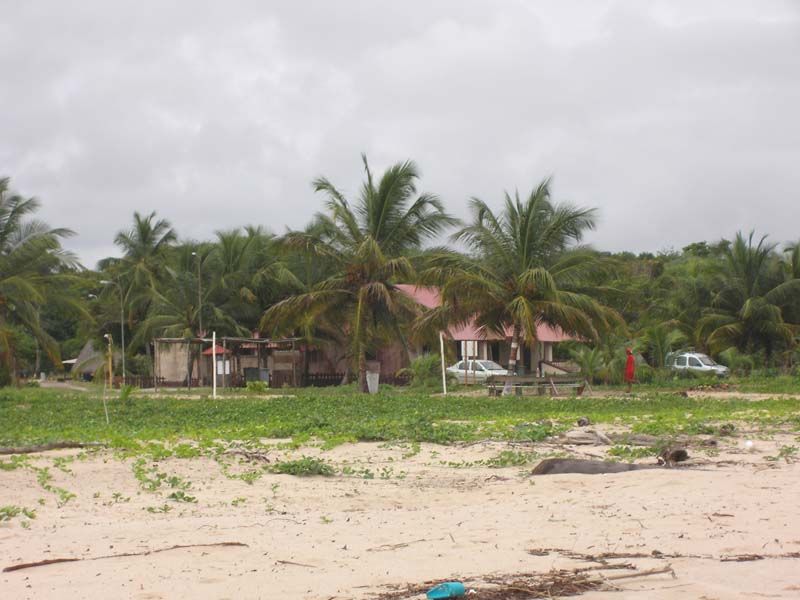
- Settlement of Yalimapo as seen from the beach of Plage des Hattes

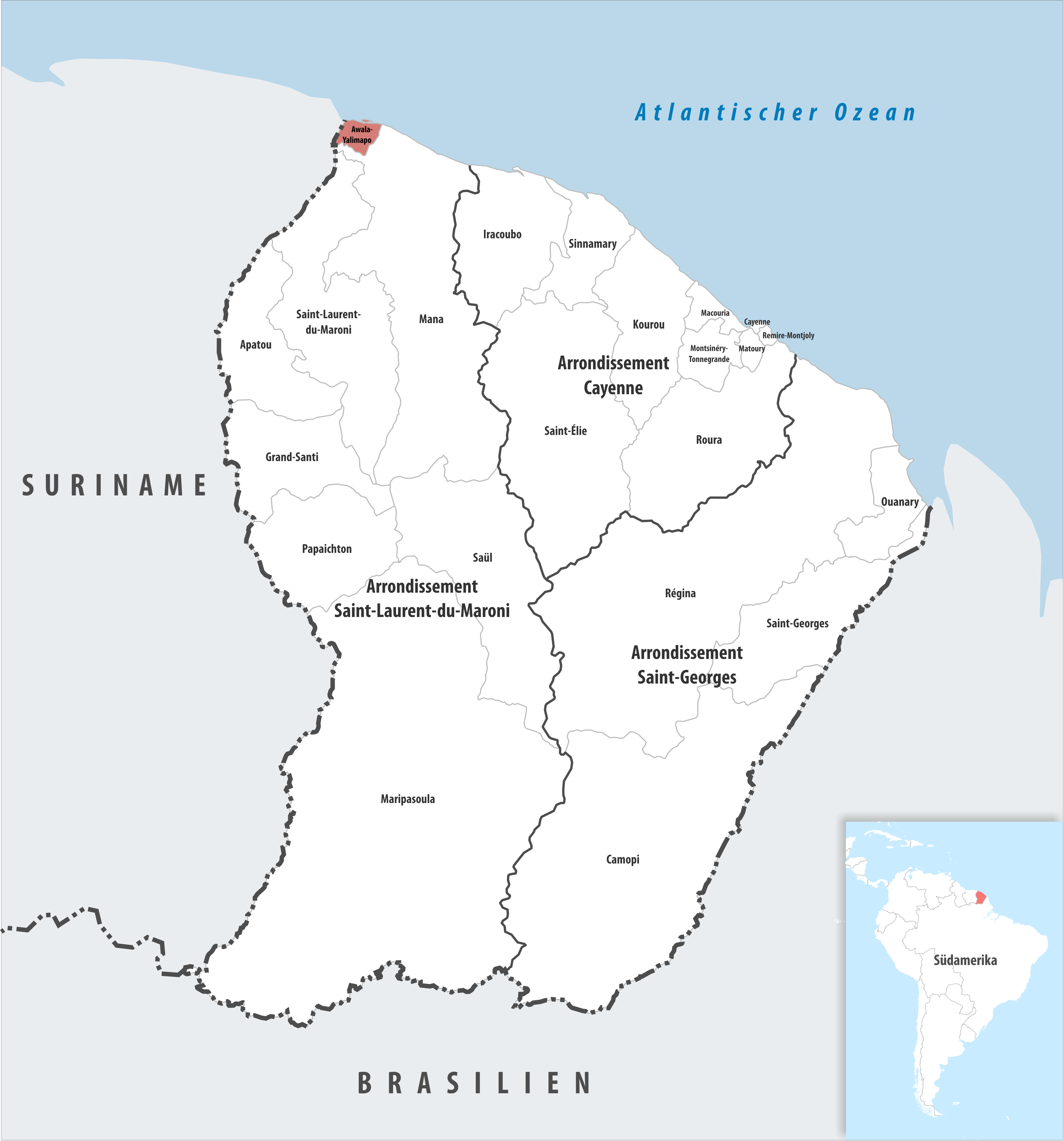
- Location of the commune (in red) within French Guiana
- Location of Awala-Yalimapo
- Location within France
- Coordinates: 5°44′28″N 53°55′40″W
- Country: France
- Overseas region and department: French Guiana
- Arrondissement: Saint-Laurent-du-Maroni
- Intercommunality: CC Ouest Guyanais

Government
  - Mayor (2020–2026): Jean-Paul Féreira
- Area^{1}: 187.4 km^{2} (72.4 sq mi)
- Population (2023): 1,577
  - Density: 8.415/km^{2} (21.80/sq mi)
- Time zone: UTC−03:00
- INSEE/Postal code: 97361 /97319
- ^{1} French Land Register data, which excludes lakes, ponds, glaciers > 1 km^{2} (0.386 sq mi or 247 acres) and river estuaries.

Awala-Yalimapo (French pronunciation: [awala jalimapo]) is a commune on the north coast of French Guiana, close to the border with Suriname. The seat of the commune is the settlement of Awala where the town hall is located. Other settlements in the commune are: Yalimapo, Ayawande, and Piliwa. The majority of the inhabitants are Kaliña Amerindian people.

== History ==
The Kalina people have been living along the Maroni River since before the European colonization. In 1596, Lawrence Kemys noted that Iaremappo, a big village, was located near the mouth of the river. European diseases reduced the number of Kalinas in the area to several hundred in the mid 19th century. In 1858, the Hattes penal colony was established in the region and operated until 1950.

In the late 1940s, Amerindians from Pointe Isère founded the village of Awala. In 1950, families from Ayawande and Galibi in Suriname founded the village of Yalimapo.

The commune of Awala-Yalimapo was created on 31 December 1988 by detaching its territory from the commune of Mana. The commune is a protected area for its ecology, flora, and fauna (ZNIEFF).

In 1987, Jacques Chirac as Prime Minister established Zones of Collective Use Rights (ZDUC). Since 1998, the commune has 1,593 hectares of communal land located in Point Isère to be used for fishing, hunting and subsistence farming.

== Nature ==
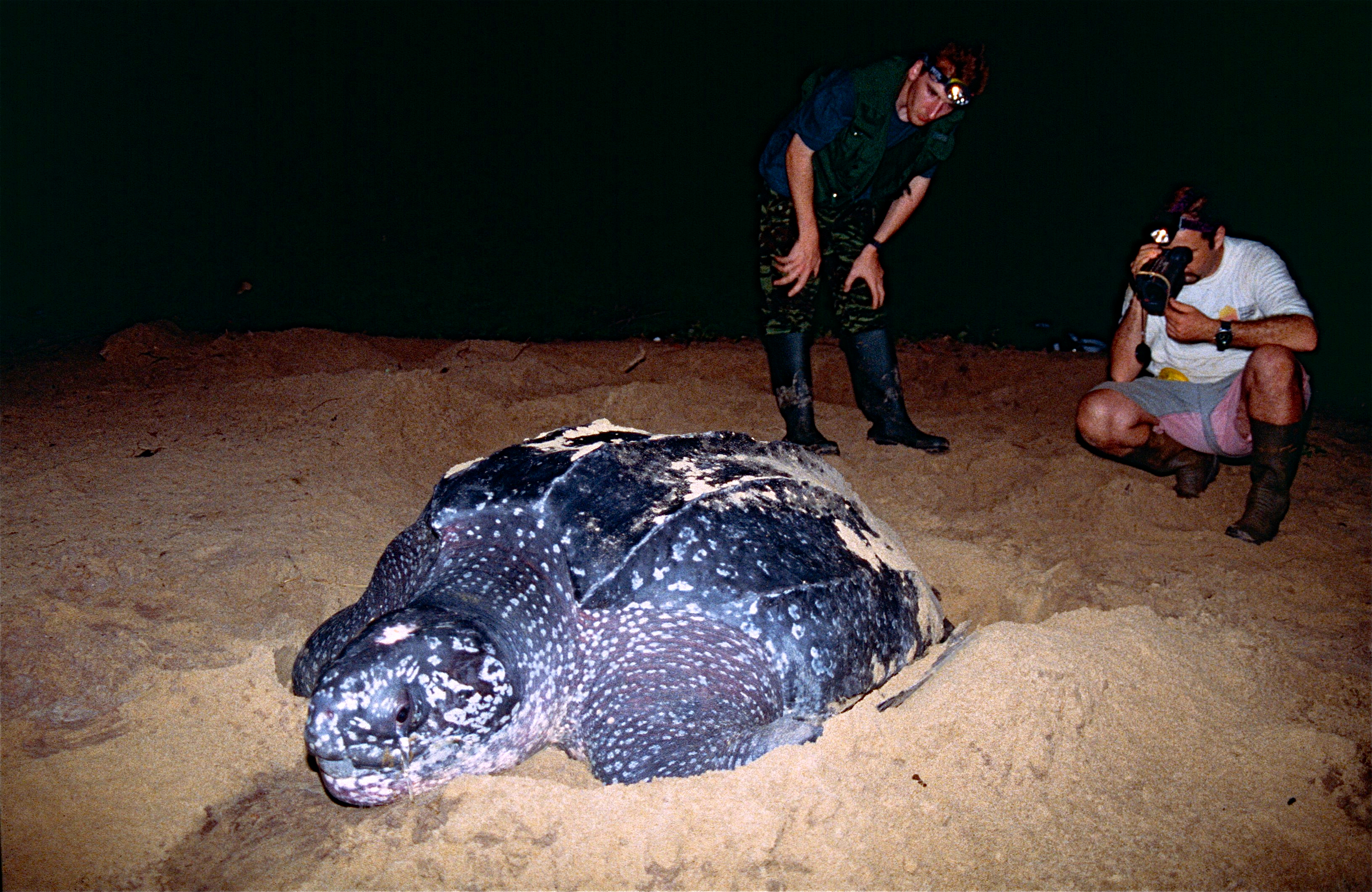
Leatherback Sea Turtle laying her eggs (2013)

Awala and Yalimapo are French Guiana's northernmost settlements, located just to the south of the région's northernmost point, the beach of Plage des Hattes, the world's largest leatherback turtle nesting site. The Amana Nature Reserve has been established in 1998 to protect the turtles. The reserve covers 14,800 hectares.

== See also ==
- Communes of French Guiana
