= Anne-Marie Javouhey =

French Catholic nun and saint (1779–1851)

Blessed Anne-Marie Javouhey SJC
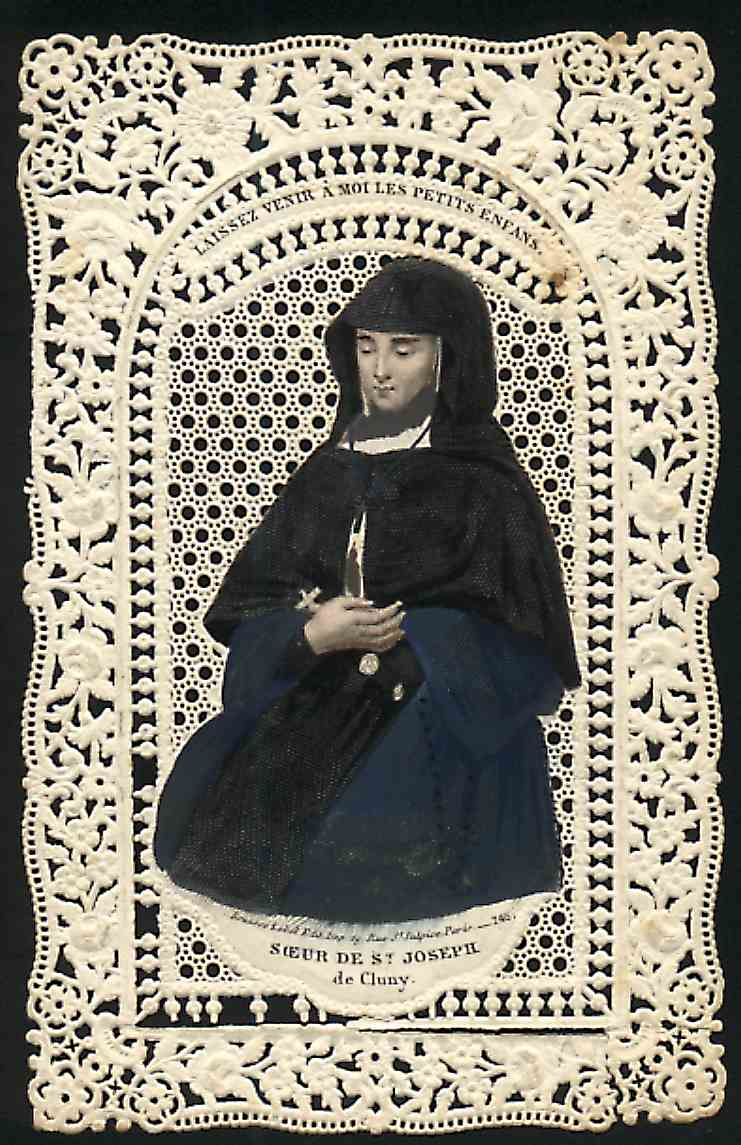
- A holy card of Blessed Anne-Marie

Liberator of the Slaves
- Born: 10 November 1779; Jallanges, Côte-d'Or, France
- Died: 15 July 1851 (aged 71); Paris, France
- Venerated in: Roman Catholic Church
- Beatified: 15 October 1950 by Pope Pius XII
- Feast: 15 July

Anne-Marie Javouhey, SJC (November 10, 1779 – July 15, 1851) was a French nun who founded the Sisters of Saint Joseph of Cluny. She is venerated in the Roman Catholic Church. She is known as the Liberator of the Slaves in the New World, and as the mother of the town of Mana, French Guiana.

== Early life ==
She was born in the commune of Chamblanc, the fifth of nine children of a local wealthy farm couple, Balthazar and Claudine Javouhey. Through her teen years, she helped to hide and care for a number of priests persecuted by the French Revolution, including keeping watch for them as they said Mass. She made a private vow when she was nineteen years old, but was not able to become a nun because the revolutionary government had closed convents and churches. In 1800, she joined the Daughters of Charity at Besançon. In 1800, she is reported to have had a vision of Teresa of Avila entrusting children of different races to her. She did not understand its meaning at the time. Javouhey did not remain at the convent. In 1801, she started a school for poor children near Chamblanc. Given the poverty of the conditions, it was not particularly successful. She then entered a Trappistine Convent, and having completed the novitiate, once again returned home.

== Foundress ==
Javouhey was joined by three of her sisters, and together they opened a school and an orphanage. Their father provided some financial assistance. She founded the Sisters of St. Joseph at Cabillon in 1805 to educate children and to help reduce the miseries which arose out of the French Revolution. In early stages in order to get children to attend the school, she resorted to playing football with the locals and requested them to attend school to play more football. She received permission from the government to use a former seminary which had become national property and there educated young girls and trained them for work. In 1810, the building became a prison for Spanish prisoners of war. The sisters took up nursing in the prison hospital. Javouhey contracted typhus but recovered. In 1812, Javouhey bought them the former Recollects monastery at Cluny. This convent became their motherhouse until 1849. Javouhey also opened workshops and a home for war widows.

== Missions ==
In 1817, Javouhey was invited to open a school on Île Bourbon, in the Indian Ocean. In 1819 she established a mission presence at Saint-Louis, Senegal and in Gorée, Senegal, where she focused on improving the hospitals. Her first attempt to develop an African clergy, was to found a Christian village, but this effort failed after an epidemic. In 1822, the institute was present in Guyana and Guadeloupe;

At the request of the British government, she left for St. Mary's in Gambia, a holding place for about 400 slaves taken from Moorish vessels. There she worked tirelessly to help the victims of an epidemic in the area. The governor then asked her to go to Sierra Leone. Again she focused her efforts on tending to the sick and injured. After three months, there was an outbreak of yellow fever; again Javouhey recovered, but was so very weak that she returned to France.

Once back in France, Javouhey realized that she needed to re-establish control of the mission on Île Bourbon, and sent her sister Rosalie to take charge.

== French Guiana ==
The government of France contacted her to try to establish a colony in the interior of the country of the South American colony of Guiana. After receiving full approval for her plans, Javouhey left with 36 nuns and 50 emigrants. Over time New Angoulême turned out not to be a success, and after five years work, she returned to France.

In 1828, she returned to the area, at the request of the French government to assist in preparing a group of African slaves for emancipation. The settlement, known as Mana, became quite prosperous and attracted the jealousy of colonists at the mouth of the Acarouany River. A plot was hatched to kill her, but the boatman who was to tip her into the crocodile-infested water could not bring himself to kill her. There were no scenes or other troubles at the emancipation and liberation of this group of slaves as marked similar occasions in other French colonies. By 1841, 400 slaves had been emancipated.

She returned to France again in 1843, facing several difficulties, including ecclesiastical opposition. During the Revolution of 1848 Javouhey organized the sisters into a sort of ambulance-brigade to care for the wounded. She and her order continued to establish new mission houses of her order all over the world, including in India, Tahiti, Madagascar, and over 30 foundations in France.

== Death and canonization ==
She died in Paris in 1851. The cause for her beatification was introduced on February 11, 1908, and she was beatified on October 15, 1950.

== Legacy ==
Today the Congregation of the Sisters of St. Joseph of Cluny numbers close to 3,000 Sisters serving in over 60 countries, including the United States, Canada, India and Ireland.

== Bibliography ==
- ANNE-MARIE JAVOUHEY et les SOEURS DE SAINT JOSEPH DE CLUNY, information including bibliography (in French)

== Sources ==
- Richardson, Michael (1965). "The Adventurous Nun - The Story of Anne-Marie Javouhey 1779–1851". The Australian Catholic Truth Society, No. 1467, pp. 31
