= Politics of French Guiana =

French Guiana is not a separate territory but is both an overseas région and overseas department of France, with the same government institutions as areas on the French mainland. The administrative center is Cayenne.

The President of France appoints a prefect (resident at the prefecture building in Cayenne) as his representative to head the local government of French Guiana. The Assembly of French Guiana replaced the General Council and the Regional Council in 2016.

As of 2020 the prefect is Thierry Queffelec. The acting President of the Guianese Assembly since 2026 is Jean-Paul Fereira, whose provisional term began after the death of Gabriel Serville.

== Key issues and players ==
Politics in French Guiana were dominated by the Guianese Socialist Party, which has a close association with the Socialist Party in mainland France.

A chronic issue affecting French Guiana is the influx of illegal immigrants and clandestine gold prospectors from Brazil and Suriname. The border between the department and Suriname is formed by the Maroni River, which flows through rain forest and is difficult for the Gendarmerie and the French Foreign Legion to patrol.

There have been several phases launched by the French government to combat illegal gold mining in French Guiana, beginning with Operation Anaconda beginning in 2003, followed by Operation Harpie in 2008, 2009 and Operation Harpie Reinforce in 2010. Colonel François Müller, the commander of French Guiana's gendarme, believes these operations have been successful. However, after each operation ends, Brazilian miners, known as garimpeiros, return. Soon after Operation Harpie Reinforce began, an altercation took place between French authorities and Brazilian miners. On March 12, 2010, a team of French soldiers and border police were attacked while returning from a successful operation, during which "the soldiers had arrested 15 miners, confiscated three boats, and seized 617 grams of gold... currently worth about $22,317". Garimpeiros returned to retrieve the lost loot and colleagues. "The soldiers fired warning shots and rubber "flash balls" but the miners managed to retake one of their boats and about 500 grammes of gold. "The violent reaction by the garimpeiros can be explained by the exceptional take of 617 grammes of gold, about 20 percent of the quantity seized in 2009 during the battle against illegal mining", said Phillipe Duporge, the director of French Guiana's border police, at a press conference the next day."

== General Council of French Guiana ==
The General Council of French Guiana was the deliberative executive assembly and was composed of 19 members who were elected by popular vote to serve six-year terms. It was led by the President of the General Council of French Guiana.

=== Composition ===
Party		seats
•	Miscellaneous Left	7
•	Guianese Socialist Party	3
	Independents	3
	Miscellaneous Right	3
	Union for a Popular Movement	3
•	Walwari	1

== Regional Council of Guiana ==
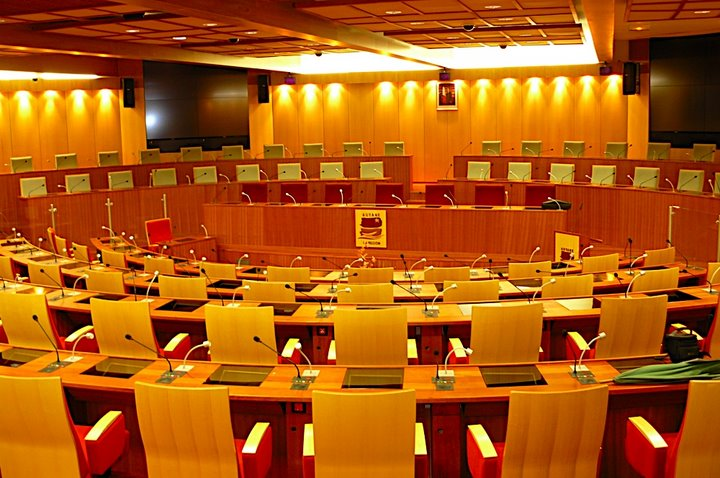
The interior chamber of the Regional Council.

The Regional Council of French Guiana was the elected assembly or regional council and was composed of 31 members who were elected by popular vote to serve six-year terms.

=== Composition ===
Party		seats
•	Guianese Socialist Party	29
	Union for a Popular Movement	7
	Walwari	7

== Parliamentary representation ==
Guiana elects two senators to the French Senate. The first woman to be elected to the Senate was Marie-Laure Phinéra-Horth in 2020.

=== Current deputies ===
Guiana also elects two deputies to the French National Assembly. The last elections were held in June 2022. The Decolonization and Social Emancipation Movement has one deputy, Jean-Victor Castor, and La France Insoumise has one deputy, Davy Rimane.

Constituency	Member	Party
1st	Jean-Victor Castor	Decolonization and Social Emancipation Movement
2nd	Davy Rimane	La France Insoumise
