= Sisters of St. Joseph of Cluny =

Roman Catholic religious institute

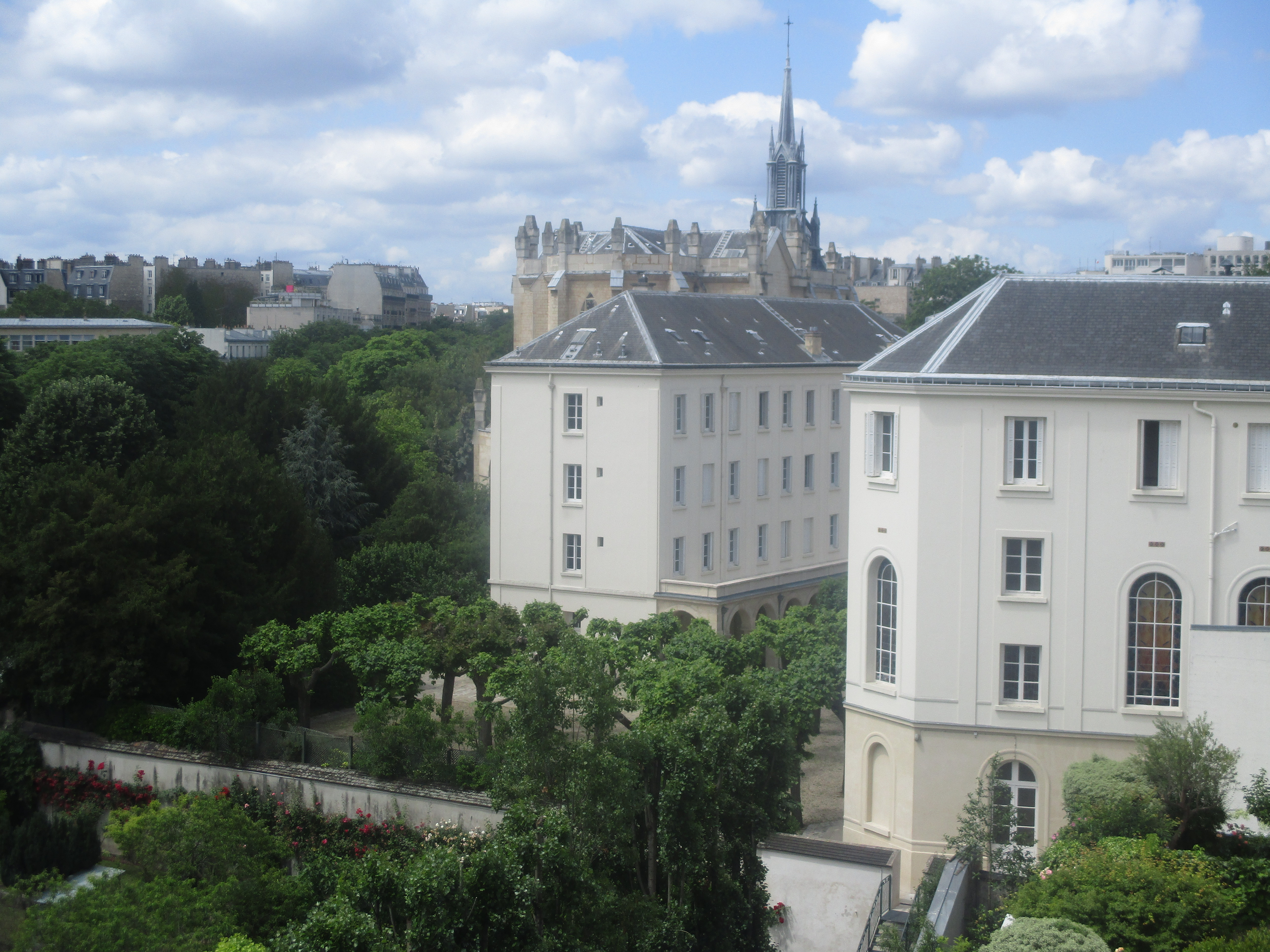
Mother house of the Sisters of St. Joseph of Cluny in Paris, France

The Sisters of St. Joseph of Cluny is a Catholic religious institute for women founded in 1807. Stationed around the world, its members perform a variety of charitable works but they devote themselves especially to missionary work and providing education for the poor.

== Founding ==
Anne Marie Javouhey, the founder of the religious institute, was born in a remote village in Burgundy, France, on November 10, 1779 and died on the July 15, 1851.

Javouhey grew up at a time when the country was in the grip of the French Revolution. Churches and schools were closed and priests were persecuted. She, along with her parents, helped save the lives of priests who would not swear an oath of allegiance to the State. It was under these circumstances that Anne Marie as a young girl tried to meet the spiritual needs of the people around her. Not long after she turned 20, Anne Marie chose to become a nun, but for her it was not an easy process. She made several attempts to enter religious life and ended up leaving several institutes, before deciding to begin one of her own. Anne Marie was encouraged in this endeavor by Pope Pius VII during a meeting in 1805, in the town of Chalon-sur-Saône, France.

Two years later, on 12 May 1807, Bishop Imberties of Autun officially bestowed religious habits upon Anne Marie and eight other women, including three of her sisters. This act officially founded the Society of St. Joseph of Cluny in Cluny, France. The congregation became known as the Sisters of St. Joseph of Cluny.

Initially, the education of children and the care of the orphans was their primary work. Javouhey employed the Lancasterian method, by which abler students acted as teachers' assistants, and achieved good results that drew notice from the French government who asked for her assistance in their overseas colonies. In 1817, Javouhey was invited by the governor of Île Bourbon, to open a school on the island. In January 1822, Javouhey traveled to Senegal to work among the local population. As the numbers continued to grow, the Sisters found themselves traveling farther afield, especially to those areas colonized by the French.

In 1823, at the invitation of Charles MacCarthy, British governor of Sierra Leone opened a house there, and, soon after, in Gambia. In 1902, thirty-three sisters on Martinique perished in the eruption of Mount Pelée.

She worked with lepers in South America. When she returned to France, her attention shifted to the mentally ill, who were at that time neglected.

=== Province of West Indies ===
The province has missions in the islands of Trinidad, Tobago, Grenada, St. Vincent and St. Lucia. In 1835, l'Abbe Bertin, who had previously served as chaplain to the sisters on Martinique, was transferred to Trinidad. He brought the sisters' work to the attention of the Vicar Apostolic, Daniel McDonnell, who immediately wrote to invite the sisters to open a school in Port of Spain. The community suffered through periodic bouts of yellow fever. In 1944, four sisters died in a fire that destroyed St. Joseph's Convent in Port of Spain. The Sisters have expanded their ministry to nursing, and home visitation of the sick and the elderly.

=== Province of USA and Canada ===
The Cluny Sisters came to the Diocese of Providence in 1950 at the invitation of the Provincial of the Oblate Fathers who requested French-speaking sisters to help with a retreat house in Manville, Rhode Island. For several years, sisters assisted with duties in the cathedral rectory along with visiting the sick and elderly of the area surrounding Cathedral Square. The provincial house is in Middletown.

== Present day ==
As of 2015, there were approximately 2,600 sisters in 57 countries. The Motherhouse is in Paris. Members make public profession of the Vows of Poverty, Chastity and Obedience and live in community.

She died on 15 July 1851 and was beatified on 15 October 1950.

=== Expansion overseas ===
As the new convent and its related school grew in reputation, the Governor of the island of Bourbon (present-day Réunion), who had come to France looking for teachers, asked Mother Javouhey to send Sisters to Bourbon. She recognized this request as a sign, and saw an opportunity to fulfill the service and aid goals that she felt were her purpose in this life. Without hesitation she accepted, and she sent a third of her Sisters to Bourbon in January 1817. This was the beginning of the rapid missionary expansion of the Congregation.

Two years later, the Sisters arrived in Saint-Louis, Senegal, then in 1822 the French West Indies, and in 1826 Saint Pierre and Miquelon. In 1836 the blue-robed Sisters were welcomed to the British West Indies, and some time later they established houses in Tahiti.

At the death of their Foundress on 15 July 1851, the Sisters of St. Joseph of Cluny numbered about 1,000 and houses were located on five continents around the world.

=== Cluny in Asia ===
The Sisters of St. Joseph of Cluny arrived in India in the year 1827, and established their first house in Puducherry under the administration of Bishop Hébert. They went on to make their presence felt in various territories. Some of the places where the sisters have established are New Delhi, Puducherry, Tamil Nadu, West Bengal, Karnataka, Goa, Kerala, Andhra Pradesh, Bihar, Sikkim and Madhya Pradesh.

1827	Puducherry	13 houses
1861	West Bengal	19 houses
1894	Tamil Nadu	39 houses
1948	Karnataka(Bangalore)	11 houses
1963	Goa	4 houses
1971	Kerala	3 houses
1973	Sikkim	4 houses
1975	Jharkhand	2 houses
1982	Andhra Pradesh	7 houses
1988	Bihar	1 house
1988	Nepal	3 houses
1990	Delhi	1 house
1994	Philippines	2 houses
1997	Assam	1 house

== Sisters of St. Joseph of Cluny today ==
Today, the Sisters of St. Joseph of Cluny number around 3000, and belong to some 70 different nationalities and are serving in more than 50 countries. More than a third are Indian and almost one-fifth are African or Malgache.

Europe	94 houses
Africa	68 houses
Oceania	24 houses
Americas	80 houses
Indian Ocean	35 houses
Asia	110 houses

== See also ==
- Anne-Marie Javouhey
