= Mana, French Guiana =

Commune in French Guiana, France

Mana
- Commune
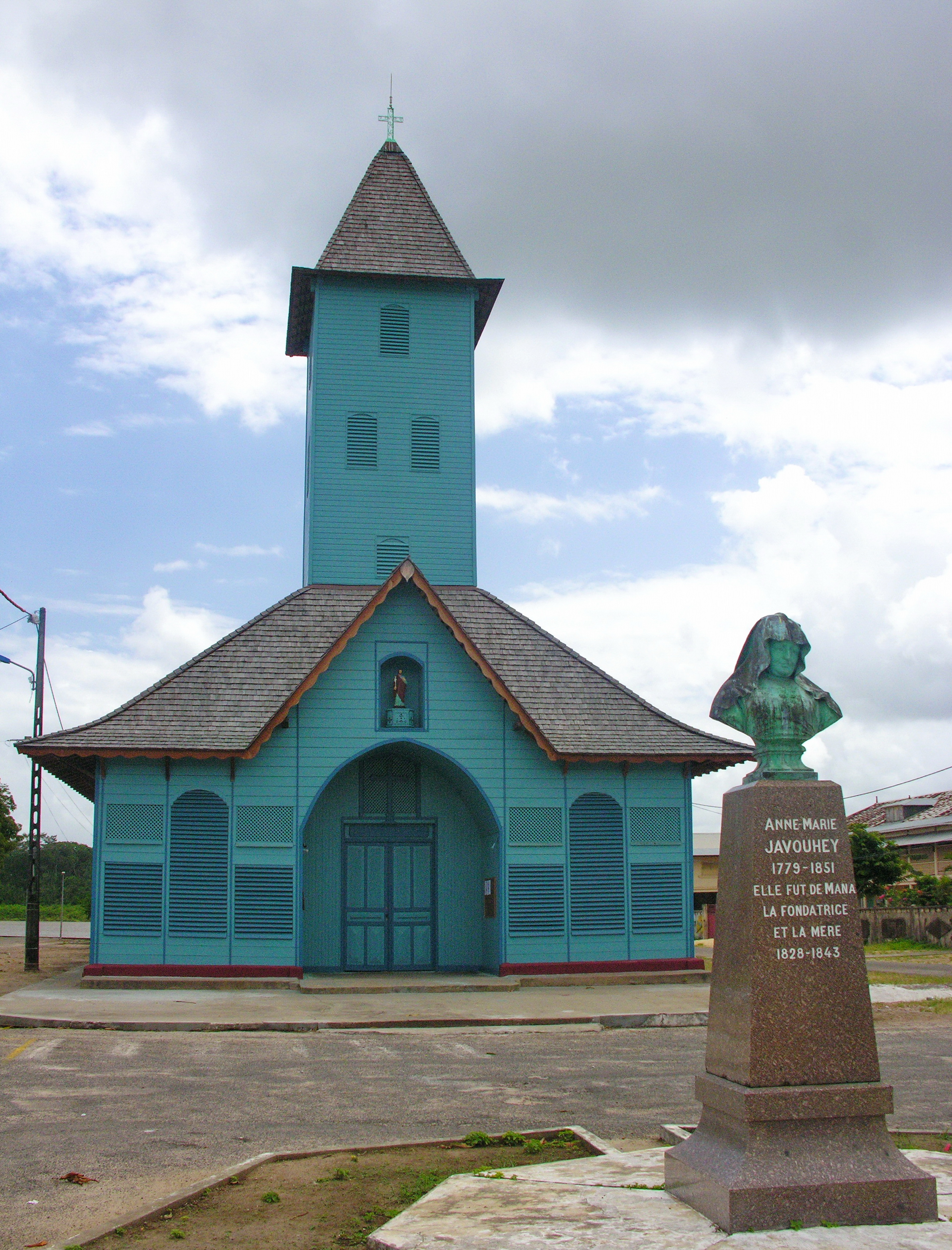
- The church of Saint-Joseph of Mana

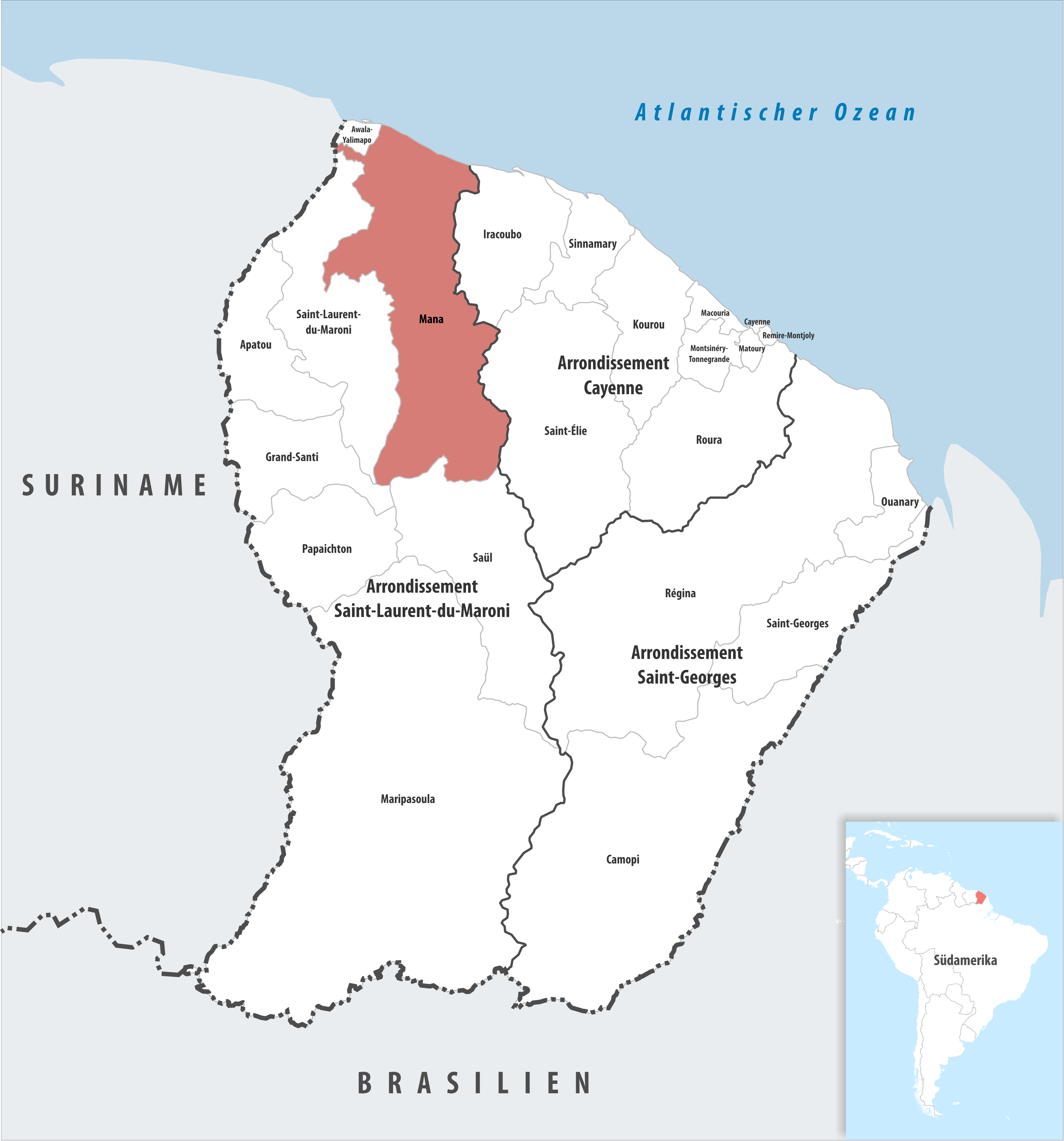
- Location of the commune (in red) within French Guiana
- Location of Mana
- Coordinates: 5°40′11″N 53°46′41″W
- Country: France
- Overseas region and department: French Guiana
- Arrondissement: Saint-Laurent-du-Maroni
- Intercommunality: Ouest Guyanais

Government
  - Mayor (2020–2026): Albéric Benth
- Area^{1}: 6,333 km^{2} (2,445 sq mi)
- Elevation: 5 m (16 ft)
- Population (2023): 10,957
  - Density: 1.730/km^{2} (4.481/sq mi)
- Time zone: UTC−03:00
- INSEE/Postal code: 97306 /97360
- ^{1} French Land Register data, which excludes lakes, ponds, glaciers > 1 km^{2} (0.386 sq mi or 247 acres) and river estuaries.

Mana (French pronunciation: [mana]; French Guianese Creole: Mannan) is a commune and town in French Guiana. It was founded on 16 August 1828 by Sister Anne-Marie Javouhey. It borders the river Mana, from where it gets its name; and is nearby the river Maroni. Mana is the primary producer of rice in French Guiana, which it exports to Suriname.

On 31 December 1988, about 3% of the territory of Mana was detached and became the commune of Awala-Yalimapo. Awala-Yalimapo is inhabited by Galibi Amerindians.

== History ==
The first settlement of people from Jura failed in alcoholism and disease. In 1828, the Ministry of the Navy and Colonies sent Sister Anne-Marie Javouhey to colonize the area. Javouhey set out to build a viable community based on agriculture and invited black traders to settle, which was not the white colony as the Ministry envisioned. When 20 escaped slaves settled in the area, she bought them from their owners.

In 1833, Governor Jean Jubelin visited Mana, and appreciated the efforts and progress. Jubelin arranged for orphans to be sent to Mana and the establishment of a leper colony in Acarouany. In 1838, the colony faced a manpower shortage. Javouhey suggested to educate and train 3,000 children of the slaves. The government refused to subsidize the plan, and Javouhey left in 1843.

On 15 October 1950, Sister Anne-Marie Javouhey was beatified by Pope Pius XII.

In 1978, Javouhey was founded as the second Hmong resettlement village in French Guiana. The village is on a former agricultural colony founded by Anne-Marie Javouhey.

== Population ==
Historical population
Year	Pop.	±% p.a.
1967	875	—
1974	1,063	+2.82%
1982	1,429	+3.77%
1990	4,945	+16.79%
1999	5,445	+1.08%
2007	8,256	+5.34%
2012	9,334	+2.48%
2017	10,894	+3.14%
2023	10,957	+0.10%
Source: INSEE

== Nature ==
In 1996, La Trinité National Nature Reserve was founded. It covers 76,903 hectares and is primary tropical rain forest located in the heart of the Guyana plateau forest.

The Amana Nature Reserve has been established in 1998 to protect the leatherback turtle. The reserve covers 14,800 hectares.

== Economy ==
The economy of the area is based on agriculture, and gold mining. Mines in the commune include Coulor, and Délices.

== Villages ==
- Acarouany
- Charvein
- Javouhey

== Notable people ==
- Chantal Berthelot (born 1958), French politician.

== See also ==
- Communes of French Guiana
