= Regional Council of French Guiana =

Regional Council of French Guiana Conseil régional de la Guyane

Type
- Type: Unicameral

Elections
- Voting system: Proportional representation

Meeting place
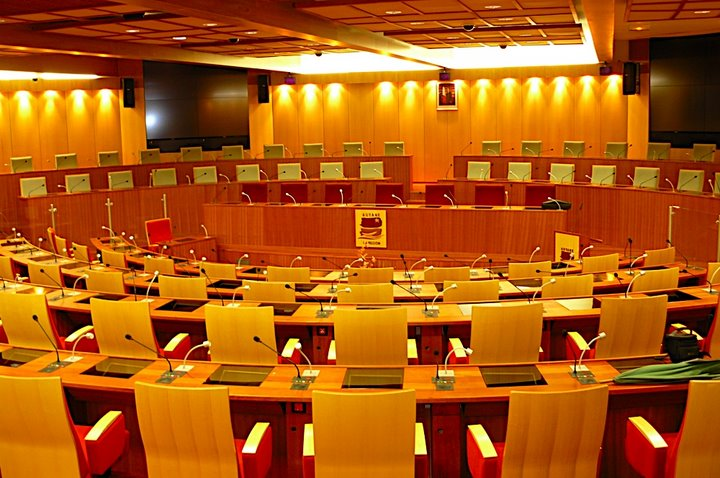
- Cayenne

Website
- www.cr-guyane.fr/institution-region/assemblee-regionale

The Regional Council of French Guiana (French: Conseil régional de la Guyane) was the elected regional council of French Guiana. It ceased to exist on 1 January 2016, when it was replaced by the Assembly of French Guiana. It was composed of 31 members, presided over by the President of the Regional Council of French Guiana and headquartered at the Cité Administrative Régionale, near the outskirts of Cayenne.

== See also ==
- Politics of French Guiana
- List of legislatures by country
