= Arrondissement of Saint-Laurent-du-Maroni =

Saint-Laurent-du-Maroni
- Arrondissement
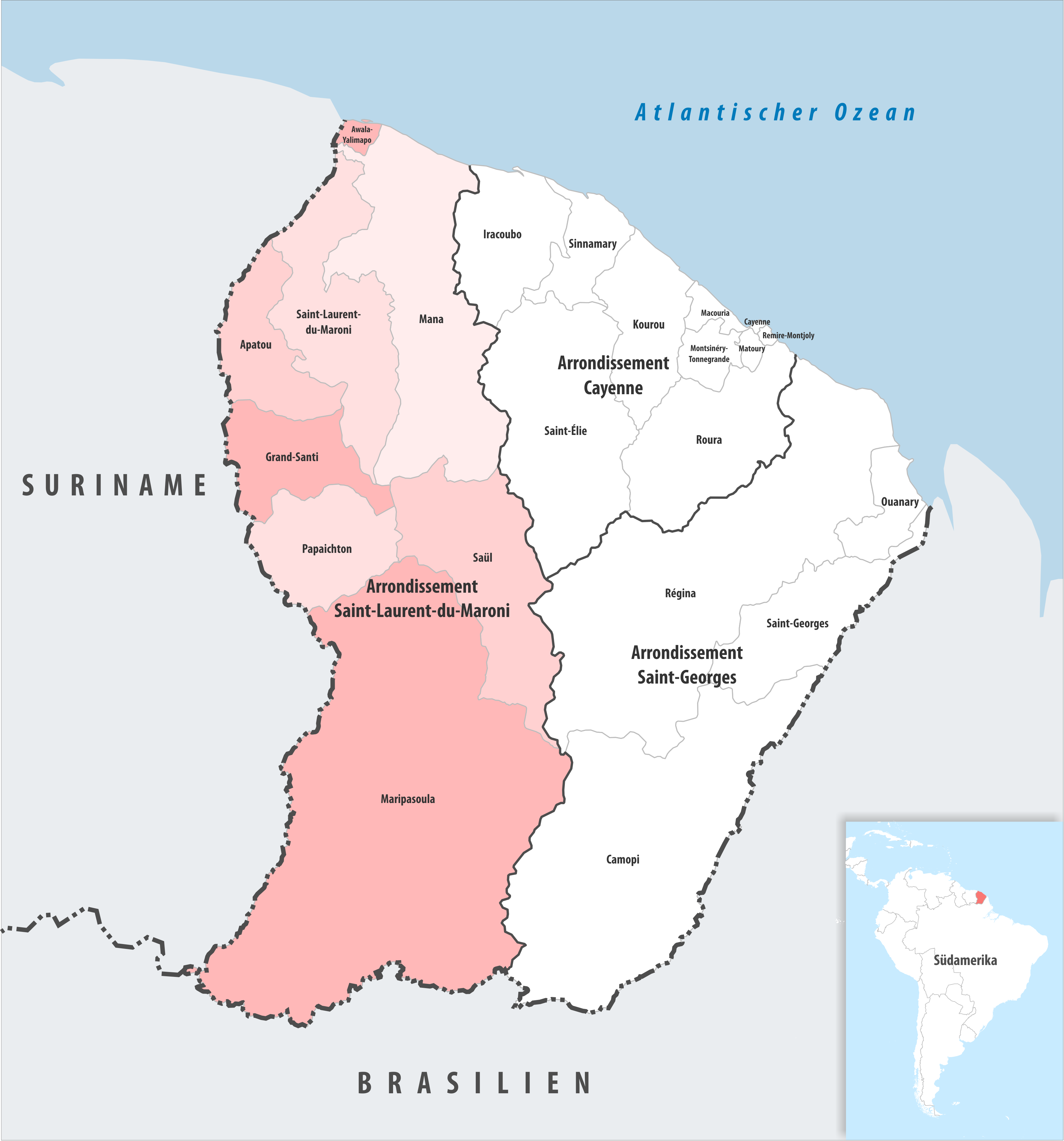
- Location within French Guiana
- Coordinates: 5°29′44″N 54°01′51″W
- Country: France
- Overseas region and department: French Guiana{{{region}}}
- No. of communes: {{{nbcomm}}}
- Area: 40,945 km^{2} (15,809 sq mi)
- Population (2023): 101,799
  - Density: 2.4862/km^{2} (6.4393/sq mi)
- INSEE code: 9732

The arrondissement of Saint-Laurent-du-Maroni is an arrondissement of France located in the French Guiana department and region. Established in 1969, the arrondissement spans 40,945 square kilometers and contains eight communes, having historically been subdivided into three cantons. As of the 2023 official estimate, it had a population of 101,799, representing over a third of French Guiana's total population. In May 2025, the French Government announced plans to construct a €400 million maximum security prison within the isolated jungle of the arrondissement, slated to open as early as 2028 to house high-risk inmates.

== Composition ==
The communes of the arrondissement of Saint-Laurent-du-Maroni, and their INSEE codes, are:

1. Apatou (97360)
2. Awala-Yalimapo (97361)
3. Grand-Santi (97357)
4. Mana (97306)
5. Maripasoula (97353)
6. Papaïchton (97362)
7. Saint-Laurent-du-Maroni (97311)
8. Saül (97352)

== History ==
The arrondissement of Saint-Laurent-du-Maroni was established in 1969.

Before 2015, the arrondissements of French Guiana were subdivided into cantons. Saint-Laurent-du-Maroni was divided into three cantons: Mana, Maripasoula, and Saint-Laurent-du-Maroni.

== Demographics ==
According to data provided by the institut national de la statistique et des études économiques (INSEE), the population of the arrondissement of Saint-Laurent-du-Maroni stood at 11,435 during the 1982 census. This figure more than doubled by the 1990 census to reach 25,989, and steady growth continued through the end of the millennium, with the 1999 census recording 37,553 inhabitants. Official estimates placed the population at 61,439 in 2007 and 89,892 in 2015. By the 2023 official estimate, the population of the arrondissement had reached 101,799. This recent growth reflects an annual population growth rate of 1.57% between 2015 and 2023.

With a total land area of 40,945 square kilometers, the arrondissement is sparsely populated, maintaining a low population density of 2.486 inhabitants per square kilometer as of 2023. However, it commands a significant share of the territory's overall population. Based on the 2023 estimates, the 101,799 residents of the arrondissement account for 34.62% of French Guiana's total population of 293,996.

== Prison plans ==
In May 2025, the French Government announced plans to build a new maximum security prison in the region of Saint-Laurent-du-Maroni. This €400 million high-security project will be constructed in an isolated jungle location within the arrondissement, a region that historically served as the penal port of entry for the infamous Devil's Island colony. Slated to open as early as 2028, the prison is planned to hold up to 500 inmates under an extremely strict regime designed to isolate radical Islamists and major drug traffickers.

== See also ==
- Montagne d'Or mine
