= Departmental Council of French Guiana =

Executive assembly of the French Guiana region of France

The General Council of French Guiana (French: Conseil général de la Guyane) was the deliberative executive assembly of the French Department of French Guiana. (French Guiana was also a French region, with a Regional Council, the Regional Council of French Guiana, as well).

The General Council was chaired by the President of the General Council of French Guiana. Alain Tien-Liong, of the DVG, held the presidency of the General Council from 2008 to the abolition of the department in 2015.
