= St. Anthony of Padua Church =

St. Anthony of Padua Church may refer to:

== Asia ==
- St. Antony of Padua Church, Sundampatti, India
- St. Anthony's Church, Tel Aviv, Israel
- Church of St. Anthony of Padua, Kokshetau, Kazakhstan
- Basilica of St. Anthony of Padua, Tonga

=== Philippines ===
- Saint Anthony of Padua Church (Barotac Nuevo, Iloilo)
- St. Anthony of Padua Parish Church (Camaligan)
- San Antonio de Padua Parish Church (Pila)

== Europe ==
- Church of Saint Anthony of Padua, Busovača, Bosnia and Herzegovina
- Church of Saint Anthony of Padua, Sarajevo, Bosnia and Herzegovina
- St Anthony's Basilica, Rheine, Germany
- Co-Cathedral of St. Anthony of Padua, Békéscsaba, Hungary
- St. Anthony of Padua Cathedral, Telšiai, Lithuania
- Church of St. Anthony of Padua, Ukrinai, Lithuania
- Chapel of St Anthony of Padua, Fort Manoel, Malta
- St. Anthony of Padua Cathedral, Breda, Netherlands
- Church of Saint Anthony of Lisbon, Lisbon, Portugal
- St. Anthony of Padua Church (Arad, Romania)
- Church of St. Anthony of Padua, Belgrade, Serbia
- St Anthony of Padua Church, Košice, Slovakia
- Royal Chapel of St. Anthony of La Florida, Madrid, Spain
- Church of St. Anthony of Padua, Istanbul, Turkey

=== Croatia ===
- Church of Saint Anthony of Padua, Gornji Kosinj
- Church of Saint Anthony of Padua, Nunić
- Basilica of Saint Anthony of Padua, Zagreb

=== Italy ===
- Basilica of Saint Anthony of Padua, Padua
- Sant'Antonio da Padova in Via Merulana, Rome
- Sant'Antonio dei Portoghesi, Rome
- Sant'Antonio di Padova, Turin

=== Poland ===
- Saint Anthony of Padua Church, Bydgoszcz
- Church of St. Anthony of Padua, Czerniaków
- St. Anthony's Church, Łódź-Łagiewniki
- Church of the Assumption of the Blessed Virgin and St Anthony of Padua, Milejów
- St. Anthony's Church, Ostrołęka
- St. Anthony of Padua Church, Strzelniki
- Church of St. Anthony of Padua, Warsaw
- St. Anthony of Padua Church (Mokotów), Warsaw

=== Slovenia ===
- St. Anthony of Padua Church, Ljubljana

=== United Kingdom ===
- St Anthony of Padua Church, Liverpool, England
- St Anthony of Padua, Oxford, England
- St Anthony of Padua Church, Rye, England

== North America ==
=== Canada ===
- St. Anthony of Padua (Ottawa), Canada

=== United States ===
- Oratory Church of St. Anthony of Padua, Red Bank, New Jersey
- St. Anthony's Church (Bronx), New York
- St. Anthony of Padua Catholic Church (Hoven, South Dakota)
- St. Anthony of Padua Church (Bronx), New York
- St. Anthony of Padua Church (Buffalo)
- St. Anthony of Padua Church (Manhattan), New York
- St. Anthony of Padua Church (New Bedford, Massachusetts)
- St. Anthony of Padua Church (Washington D.C.)
- St. Anthony of Padua Roman Catholic Church, Jersey City, New Jersey
- St. Anthony of Padua Parish (Fairfield, Connecticut)
- St. Anthony of Padua Parish, Chicopee, Massachusetts

== South America ==
- St. Anthony of Padua Cathedral, Oberá, Argentina
- St. Anthony of Padua Cathedral, Patos de Minas, Brazil
- St. Anthony of Padua Church, Saül, French Guiana

== See also ==
- Anthony of Padua (1195–1231)
