= List of places of worship in Turin =

This is a list of notable places of worship in Turin, Italy.

== Churches ==
=== Roman catholic ===
- S. Agostino
- Sanctuary of Saint Anthony of Padua
- S. Barbara
- S. Carlo Borromeo
- Chapel of the Holy Shroud
- S. Chiara
- Chiesa della Madonna degli Angeli
- Chiesa della Madonna del Carmine
- Cappella dei Mercanti, Turin
- Chiesa della Misericordia
- Chiesa della Santissima Annunziata
- Chiesa della Visitazione
- Chiesa del Santo Sudario
- Chiesa del Santo Volto
- Church of Jesus of Nazareth
- Church of Mary, Queen of Peace
- Church of Our Lady of Grace
- Church of Our Lady of Health
- Church of Our Lady of Sorrows and Saint Zita
- Church of Saint Martyrs
- Church of the Holy Spirit
- Church of the Immaculate Conception
- Church of the Most Holy Trinity
- Church of the Sacred Heart of Mary
- Church of the Visitation of the Virgin Mary and Saint Barnabas
- Basilica of Corpus Domini
- S. Cristina
- S. Dalmazzo
- S. Domenico
- S. Filippo Neri
- S. Francesco da Paola
- S. Francesco d'Assisi
- S. Gioacchino
- S. Giovanni Evangelista
- S. Giulia
- S. Giuseppe
- Gran Madre di Dio
- S. Lorenzo
- Madonna del Pilone
- S. Maria di Piazza
- S. Massimo
- Basilica Mauriziana
- S. Michele
- Monte dei Cappuccini
- Basilica of Our Lady
- S. Pelagia
- S. Rita da Cascia
- S. Rocco
- S. Salvario
- Santuario della Consolata
- S. Secondo
- Basilica of Superga
- S. Teresa
- S. Tommaso
- Turin Cathedral

=== Waldensian ===
- Waldensian Temple

=== Eastern Orthodox ===
- S. Croce

== Synagogues ==
- Synagogue of Turin
