= St Anthony of Padua (disambiguation) =

St Anthony of Padua (1195–1231) was a Franciscan friar and Doctor of the Church.

St Anthony of Padua may also refer to:

- St Anthony of Padua, Oxford, a church in Oxford, England
- Church of St. Anthony of Padua, Kokshetau, a church in Kokshetau, Kazakhstan
- St. Anthony's Church (Bronx), a church in The Bronx, New York City, U.S.
- St. Anthony of Padua Church (Bronx), a church in The Bronx, New York City, U.S.
- St. Anthony of Padua Church (Manhattan), a church in Manhattan, New York City, U.S.

== See also ==
- St. Anthony of Padua Church (disambiguation)
- St. Anthony's Church (disambiguation)
