= Mazaediothecium uniseptatum =

Scientific classification
- Domain: Eukaryota
- Kingdom: Fungi
- Division: Ascomycota
- Class: Eurotiomycetes
- Order: Pyrenulales
- Family: Pyrenulaceae
- Genus: Mazaediothecium
- Species: M. uniseptatum

Binomial name
- Mazaediothecium uniseptatum Aptroot (2015)

Species of lichen

Mazaediothecium uniseptatum is a species of calicioid lichen in the family Pyrenulaceae. Found in French Guiana, it was formally described as a new species in 2015 by Dutch lichenologist André Aptroot. The type specimen was collected near the village sentier Limonade in Saül at an altitude of 300 m (980 ft); here, in a mixed forest, the lichen was found growing on the higher trunk of a Protium tree. It has a dull, greyish-white thallus that lacks a cortex and is surrounded by a brown prothallus line. The apothecia are black but covered in their upper half with a golden yellow pruina; they are about 0.2 mm in diameter and up to 0.6 mm high. The asci soon disintegrate to form a mazaedium layer. Ascospores are pale grey with a shape ranging from ellipsoid to spindle-shaped (fusiform), and measure 7.0–12.0 by 5.0–7.5 μm; they contain a single septum. It is this last feature that is referenced in the species epithet uniseptatum.
