= Astrothelium macroeustomum =

Scientific classification
- Kingdom: Fungi
- Division: Ascomycota
- Class: Dothideomycetes
- Order: Trypetheliales
- Family: Trypetheliaceae
- Genus: Astrothelium
- Species: A. macroeustomum

Binomial name
- Astrothelium macroeustomum Aptroot & Sipman (2019)

Species of lichen

Astrothelium macroeustomum is a species of corticolous (bark-dwelling) lichen in the family Trypetheliaceae. Found in French Guiana, it was formally described as a new species in 2019 by lichenologists André Aptroot and Harrie Sipman. The type specimen was collected by Sipman from the Piste Crique Limonade (near Saül) at an altitude of 300 m (980 ft). The lichen has a mostly smooth, pale ochraceous-brown thallus that is somewhat shiny and covers areas up to 9 cm (4 in) in diameter. It is surrounded by a dark brown prothallus. It has pear-shaped (pyriform) ascomata, measuring 0.6–1.0 mm in diameter, which mostly aggregate in groups of two to five, and are more or less immersed in the tissue of the bark, below the thallus surface. They have convex, black ostioles (pores) that are surrounded by a yellowish-white ring of pruina. The ascospores are hyaline, spindle-shaped (fusiform) with five septa and measure 50–55 by 12–17 μm. The lichen contains lichexanthone, a lichen product that causes the ostioles of the ascomata to fluoresce yellow when lit with a long-wavelength UV light. The specific epithet macroeustomum refers to both its large spores and its similarity to Astrothelium eustomum.
