= St. Anthony's Church =

St. Anthony's Church or St. Anthony Church or variations thereof may refer to:

== Albania ==
- St. Anthony Church, Durrës
- St. Anthony Church, Laç

== Brazil ==
- St. Anthony Cathedral, Juiz de Fora

== Canada ==
- St. Anthony of Padua (Ottawa), Ontario

== China ==
- St. Anthony's Catholic Church (Shenzhen)

== Croatia ==
- Sanctuary of St. Anthony of Padua (Zagreb)

== India ==
- St. Antony's Church, Chemmanvilai, Kanyakumari, Tamil Nadu
- St. Antony's Shrine, Kaloor, Kochi, Kerala
- St. Antony's Church, Sundampatti, Krishnagiri District, Tamil Nadu
- St. Antony's Church, Bommidi, Dharmapuri, Tamil Nadu

== Israel ==
- St. Anthony's Church, Tel Aviv

== Italy ==
- Basilica of Saint Anthony of Padua

== Kosovo ==
- Saint Anthony's Church (Gjakova)

== Portugal ==
- Santo António Church (Lisbon)

== Sri Lanka ==
- St. Anthony's church, Wahakotte
- St. Antony's shrine, Kachchatheevu

== Turkey ==
- St. Anthony of Padua Cathedral (Istanbul), Turkey

== United Kingdom ==
- St Anthony's Church, Cartmel Fell, Cumbria, England

== United States ==
Listed alphabetically by state

- Saint Anthony's Church (Casa Grande, Arizona)
- Saint Anthony's Catholic Church (Ratcliff, Arkansas)
- St. Anthony's Roman Catholic Church (Sterling, Colorado)
- St. Anthony's Roman Catholic Church (Wilmington, Delaware)
- St Anthony of Padua Church, Washington D.C.
- Saint Anthony Catholic Church (Honolulu), Hawaii
- Saint Anthony Catholic Church in Kailua, Hawaii
- Saint Anthony Catholic Church in Laupahoehoe, Hawaii
- Saint Anthony of Padua Catholic Church in Wailuku, Hawaii
- St. Anthony's Catholic Church (Davenport, Iowa)
- St. Anthony's Catholic Church (Des Moines, Iowa)
- St. Anthony of Padua Church (New Bedford, Massachusetts)
- St. Anthony's Church and School (Cedar Rapids, Nebraska)
- St. Anthony's Church (Bronx), New York
- St. Anthony of Padua Church (Bronx), New York
- St. Anthony of Padua Church (Manhattan), New York
- St. Anthony's Church (Pine Plains, New York)
- St. Anthony's Catholic Church (Padua, Ohio)
- St. Anthony's Catholic Church (Okmulgee, Oklahoma)
- Saint Anthony's Chapel (Pittsburgh), Pennsylvania — notable for its large number of relics
- Saint Anthony Cathedral Basilica in Beaumont, Texas
- Saint Anthony's Catholic Church (Bryan, Texas)
- Old St. Anthony's Catholic Church (Violet, Texas)
- Church of Saint Anthony (Casper, Wyoming)

== See also ==
- St Anthony of Padua (disambiguation)
- St. Anthony's Chapel (disambiguation)
- St. Anthony's School (disambiguation)
- St. Anthony's Hospital (disambiguation)
