= St. Anthony's Chapel =

St. Anthony's Chapel or Saint Anthony's Chapel may refer to:

- Saint Anthony's Chapel, Pittsburgh, United States — notable for its large number of relics
- St. Anthony's Chapel, Aachen, Germany
- St. Anthony's Chapel, Goa Velha, Goa, India
- St Anthony's Chapel, a ruin in Holyrood Park, Edinburgh, Scotland

== See also ==
- St. Anthony's Church (disambiguation)
