= Mazaediothecium =

Scientific classification
- Domain: Eukaryota
- Kingdom: Fungi
- Division: Ascomycota
- Class: Eurotiomycetes
- Order: Pyrenulales
- Family: Pyrenulaceae
- Genus: Mazaediothecium; Aptroot (1991)

Type species
- Mazaediothecium rubiginosum Aptroot (1991)

Species
- M. album M. mohamedii M. rubiginosum M. uniseptatum

Genus of fungi

Mazaediothecium is a genus of calicioid lichens in the family Pyrenulaceae. It has four species. The genus was circumscribed by Dutch lichenologist André Aptroot in 1991, with Mazaediothecium rubiginosum assigned as the type species.

== Species ==
- Mazaediothecium album Aptroot (1991)
- Mazaediothecium mohamedii H.Harada & Yoshik.Yamam. (2007) – Malaysia
- Mazaediothecium rubiginosum Aptroot (1991)
- Mazaediothecium uniseptatum Aptroot (2015) – French Guiana
