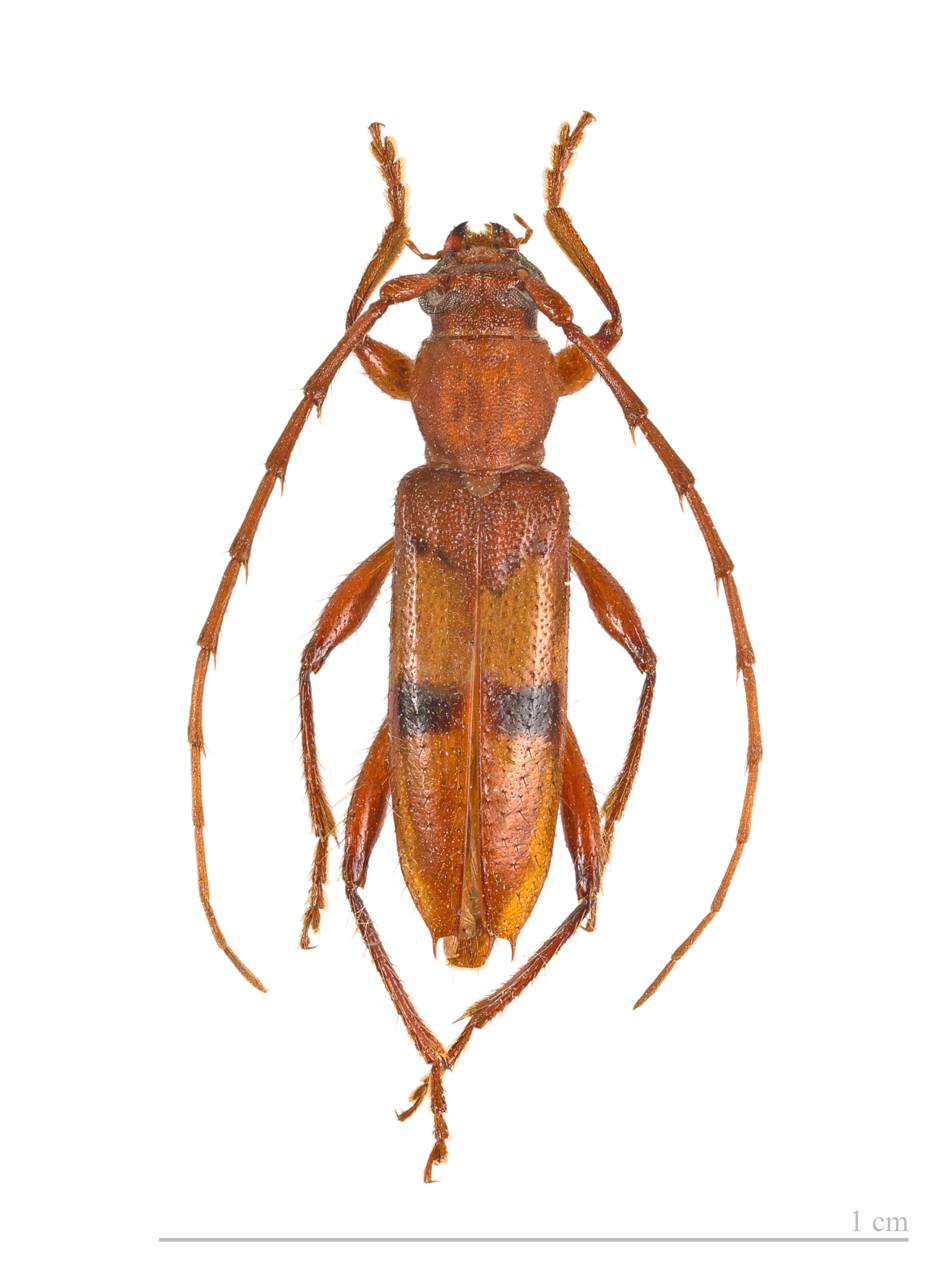
- Clausirion comptum

Scientific classification
- Kingdom: Animalia
- Phylum: Arthropoda
- Class: Insecta
- Order: Coleoptera
- Suborder: Polyphaga
- Infraorder: Cucujiformia
- Family: Cerambycidae
- Tribe: Elaphidiini
- Genus: Clausirion

= Clausirion =

Genus of beetles

Clausirion is a genus of beetles in the family Cerambycidae, containing the following species:

- Clausirion bicolor Galileo & Martins, 2000
- Clausirion comptum Martins & Napp, 1984

They are commonly known as longhorn beetles due to their elongated bodies and long antennae.
