= Bélizon =

- Village
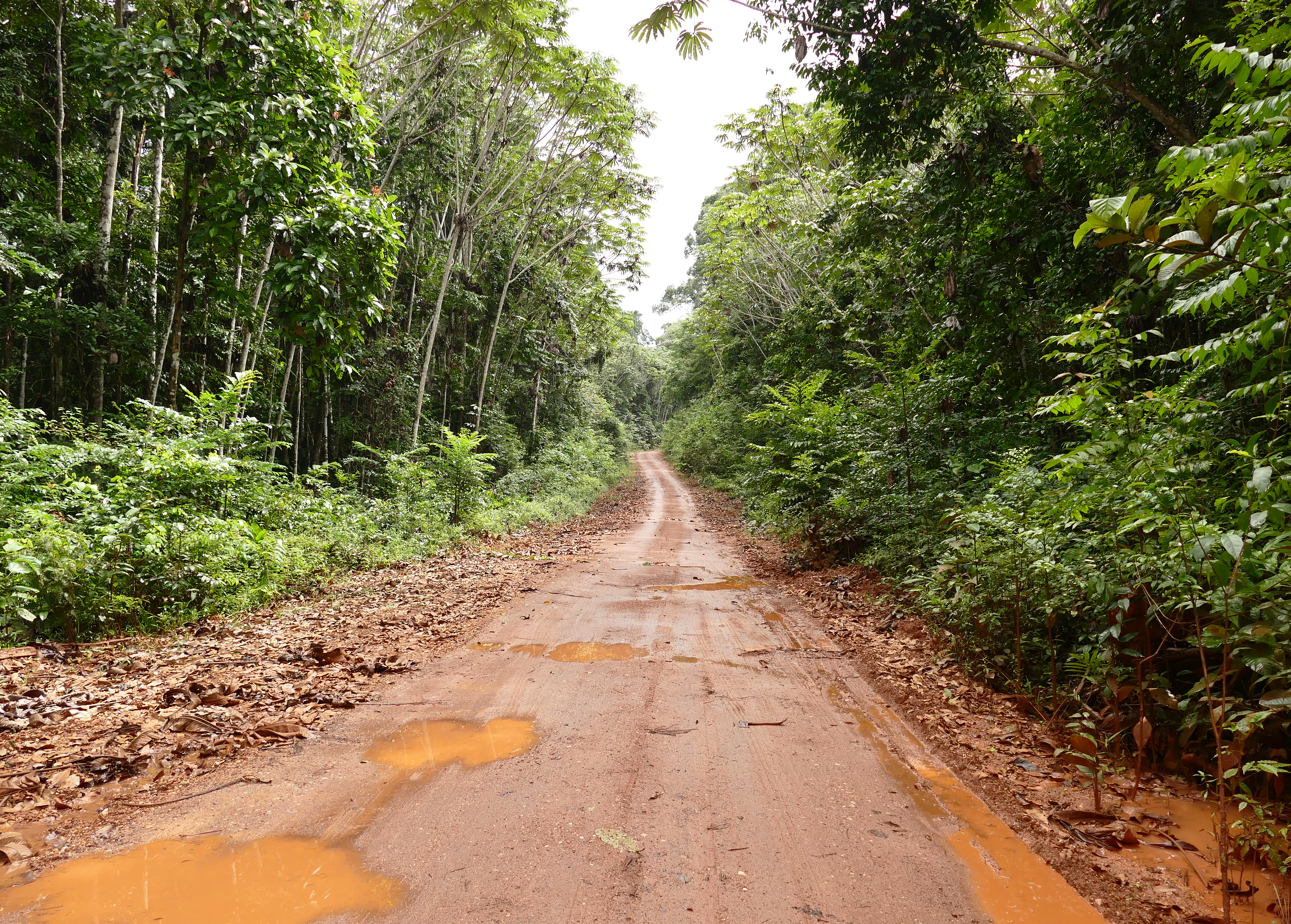
- Track of Bélizon (2007)

- Location in French Guiana
- Coordinates: 4°15′N 52°39′W
- Country: France
- Overseas region: French Guiana
- Arrondissement: Cayenne
- Commune: Roura

Bélizon (French pronunciation: [belizɔ̃]) is a village in French Guiana.

In 1952, a 150 kilometer track was constructed between Saül via Bélizon to the road leading to Cayenne by the Guinese Mining Bureau in order to develop the gold mine at Saül. The cost of the track was more expensive than the gold, and was abandoned in 1960. The route is used by illegal gold prospectors, and therefore a guard post has been set up at Bélizon in 2012.

The Clausirion bicolor and Adiposphaerion are endemic to Bélizon.
