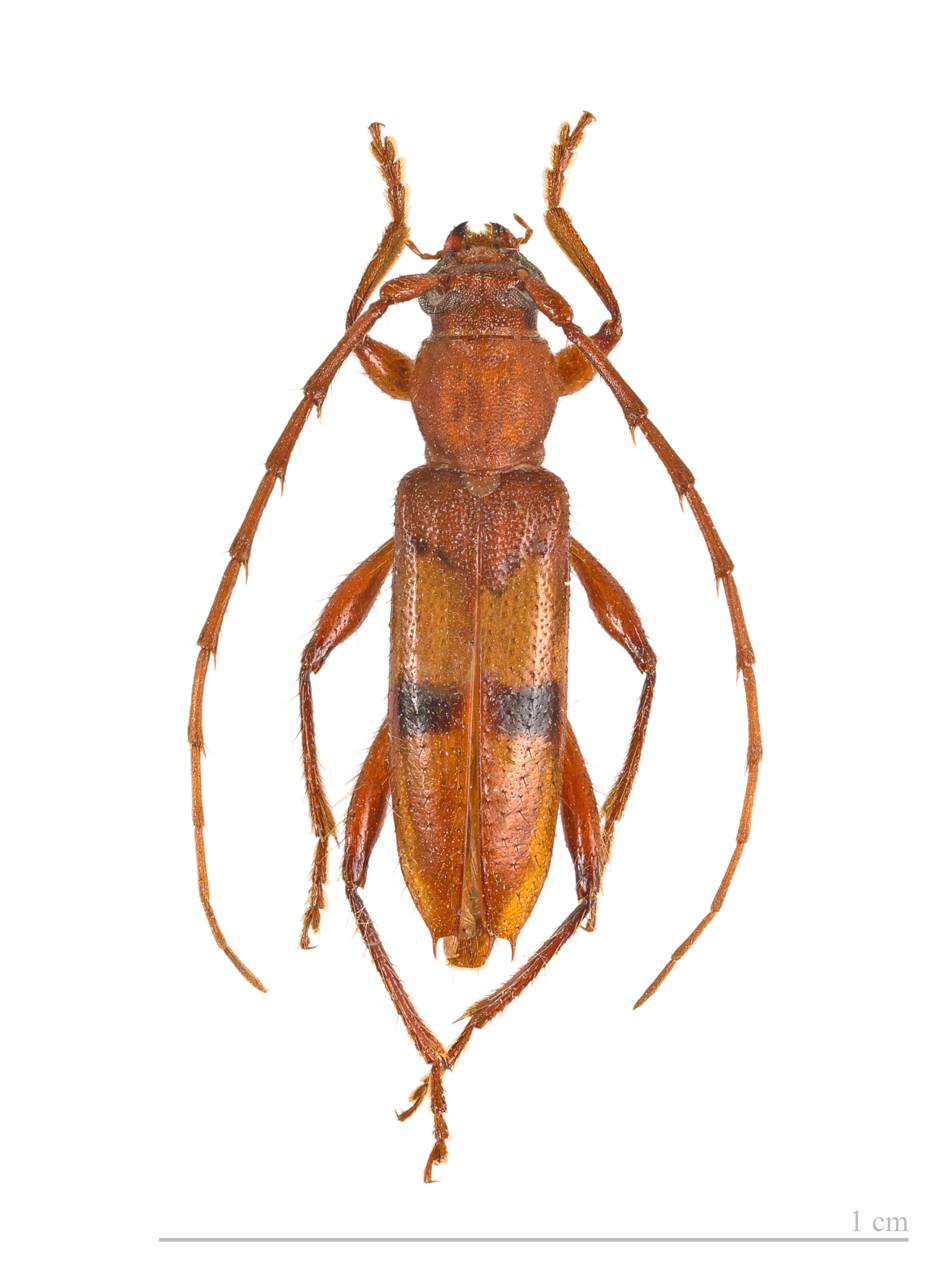

Scientific classification
- Kingdom: Animalia
- Phylum: Arthropoda
- Class: Insecta
- Order: Coleoptera
- Suborder: Polyphaga
- Infraorder: Cucujiformia
- Family: Cerambycidae
- Genus: Clausirion
- Species: C. comptum

Binomial name
- Clausirion comptum Martins & Napp, 1984

= Clausirion comptum =

Species of beetle

Clausirion comptum is a species of longhorn beetle in the Elaphidiini subfamily. It was described by Martins and Napp in 1984. It is endemic to Mato Grosso, Brazil where it flies from August to September.
