= St. Anthony of Padua Church, Saül =

Coordinates: 3.6236°N 53.2094°W

St. Anthony of Padua Church
- Église Saint-Antoine-de-Padoue de Saül
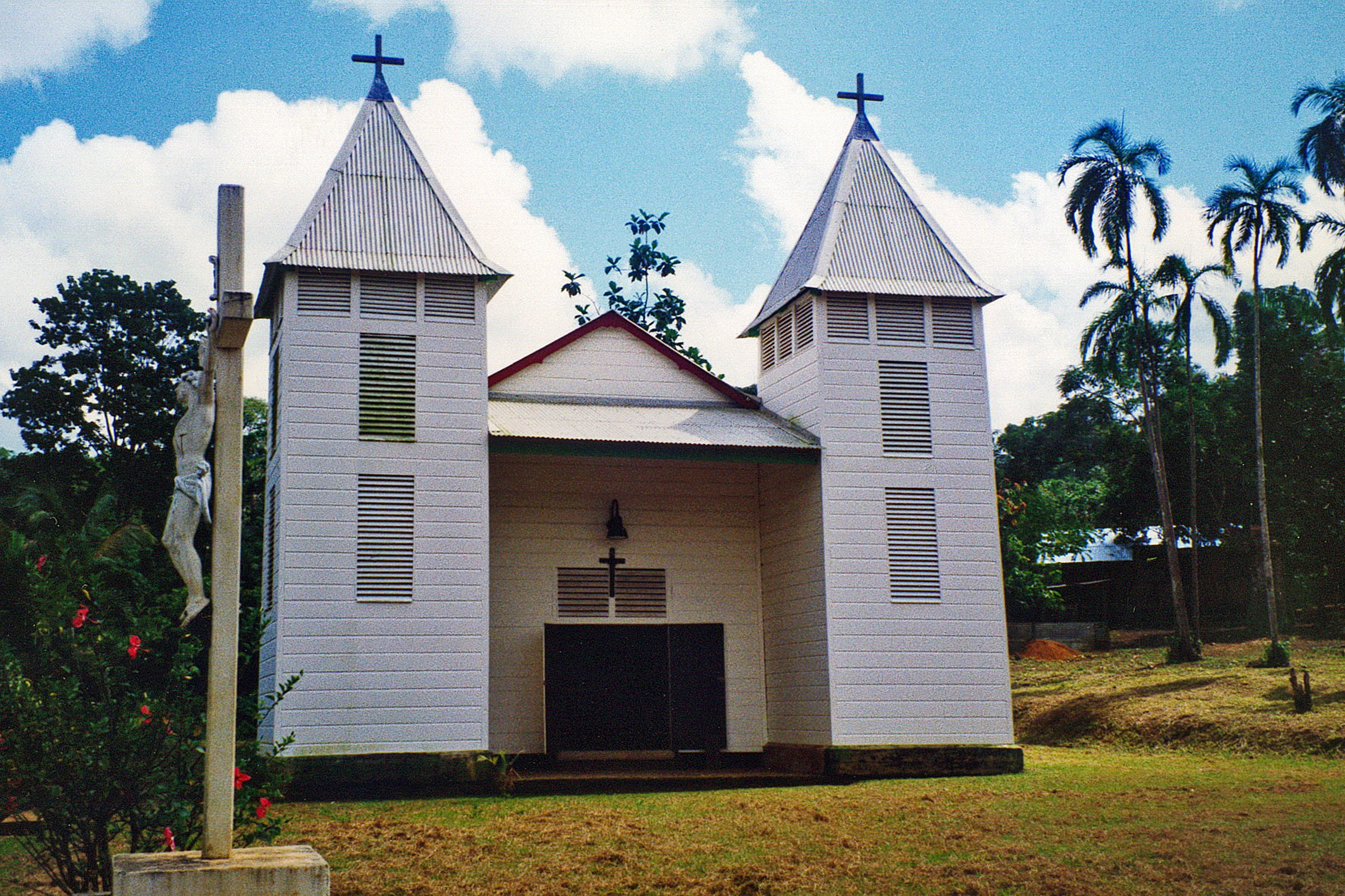
- St. Anthony of Padua Church
- Location: Saül
- Country: French Guiana; France
- Denomination: Roman Catholic Church

The St. Anthony of Padua Church (French: Église Saint-Antoine-de-Padoue de Saül) is the name given to Catholic church located in Saül, in French Guiana, a dependent territory of France in northern South America. The building has been listed as a historic monument since 1993.

His patron saint as its name suggests is St. Anthony of Padua, also known as St. Anthony of Lisbon, a priest of the Franciscan Order, Portuguese preacher and theologian.

Construction of the church began in 1952 and was completed in 1962. The village of Saül was then the center of gold mining in French Guiana. The building is now considered the most important testimony of this era. Around the church, is developing the locality, later to be elevated to municipality.

The construction was performed based on a simple design that is reminiscent of the colonial era in North America. A ship with two uniforms bell towers were added in the front.

== See also ==
- Roman Catholicism in French Guiana
- St. Anthony of Padua Church (disambiguation)
