= Sandfield Road =

Road in Headington, Oxford, England

Coordinates: 51°45′41″N 1°13′11″W

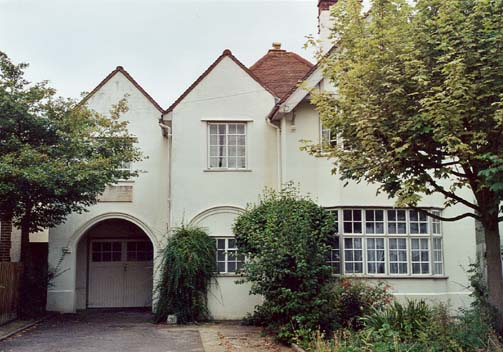
76 Sandfield Road, home of J. R. R. Tolkien.

Sandfield Road is a road in the suburb of Headington, Oxford, England. It is close to the John Radcliffe Hospital. It was home to author and academic J. R. R. Tolkien in the 1950s and 1960s.

== Notable residents ==
Hugo Dyson, a member of the Oxford literary group called the Inklings, lived at 32 Sandfield Road until his death in 1975.

Sandfield Road's most famous resident was the author and academic J. R. R. Tolkien, another member of the Inklings, who lived at No 76 with his wife Edith from 1953 to 1968, towards the end of his time in Oxford. There is an inscription above the garage. When living here, Tolkien attended the Catholic Church of St Anthony of Padua in nearby Headley Way. Tolkien previously lived in Northmoor Road, North Oxford, and Holywell Street, in central Oxford. The following volumes of Tolkien's The Lord of the Rings novel were first published while he lived in this house:

- The Fellowship of the Ring (1954)
- The Two Towers (1954)
- The Return of the King (1955)

Tolkien attended the Church of St Anthony of Padua nearby (opened in 1960) when he was a resident in Sandfield Road. In due course, Tolkien's private address at Sandfield Road received some publicity and his telephone number was in the Oxford telephone directory. In 1968, partly due to harassment by fans at his home in Sandfield Road, Tolkien moved to Bournemouth on the south coast of England.

W. H. Auden, an admirer of Tolkien, described his Sandfield Road house by reportedly stating "He lives in a hideous house, I can't tell you how awful it is — with hideous pictures on the walls."

== Other information ==
Sandfield Day Nursery is in Sandfield Road.
