= Mazaediothecium mohamedii =

Scientific classification
- Kingdom: Fungi
- Division: Ascomycota
- Class: Eurotiomycetes
- Order: Pyrenulales
- Family: Pyrenulaceae
- Genus: Mazaediothecium
- Species: M. mohamedii

Binomial name
- Mazaediothecium mohamedii H.Harada & Yoshik.Yamam. (2007)

Species of lichen

Mazaediothecium mohamedii is a species of corticolous (bark-dwelling) and crustose lichen in the family Pyrenulaceae. It is found in Peninsular Malaysia.

== Taxonomy ==
The lichen was formally described as a new species in 2007 by Hiroshi Harada and Yoshikazu Yamamoto. The type specimen was collected by the first author from the Field Studies Centre of the University of Malaya (Gombak, Selangor) at an elevation of 300 m (980 ft); here, in a tropical rainforest, the lichen was growing on the trunk of a hardwood on the side of the road. It is only known to occur at the type locality. The species epithet mohamedii refers to Professor Haji Mohamed, who arranged the field survey where this specimen was collected.

== Description ==
Mazaediothecium mohamedii has a dull, cracked, pale creamy yellow thallus that lacks a cortex. It has perithecioid ascomata (flask-shaped structures opened by a pore) measuring 0.2–0.5 mm in diameter and 0.2–0.7 mm high. The spore mass occurs in the ostioles as dark brown mazaedia (where the ascus walls break down to leave a dry, loose, amorphous, powdery, mass of spores together with disintegrating asci and paraphyses). Individual ascospores are brown, more or less ellipsoid in shape, and measure 8–11 by 6–8 μm. The photobiont partner of the lichen is a species of green alga from the genus Trentepohlia. Mazaediothecium mohamedii contains lichexanthone, a lichen product that causes the thallus to fluoresce golden yellow when lit with a long-wavelength UV light.
