= Adiposphaerion =

Scientific classification
- Kingdom: Animalia
- Phylum: Arthropoda
- Class: Insecta
- Order: Coleoptera
- Suborder: Polyphaga
- Infraorder: Cucujiformia
- Family: Cerambycidae
- Genus: Adiposphaerion
- Species: A. rubrum

Binomial name
- Adiposphaerion rubrum Martins & Napp, 1992

Genus of beetles

Adiposphaerion is a genus of longhorn beetles in the tribe Elaphidiini, containing a single species, Adiposphaerion rubrum, described my Martins and Napp in 1992. It is endemic to Bélizon, French Guiana and has a red body with black legs and antennae.
