= Clausirion bicolor =

Scientific classification
- Kingdom: Animalia
- Phylum: Arthropoda
- Class: Insecta
- Order: Coleoptera
- Suborder: Polyphaga
- Infraorder: Cucujiformia
- Family: Cerambycidae
- Genus: Clausirion
- Species: C. bicolor

Binomial name
- Clausirion bicolor Galileo & Martins, 2000

Species of beetle

Clausirion bicolor is a species of longhorn beetle in the family Cerambycidae. It was described by Galileo and Martins in 2000. It is endemic to Bélizon, French Guiana where it flies from August to September. It is 24 millimetres (0.94 in) long and have black coloured antennae. legs, and prothorax.
