= St. Anthony's Chapel, Goa Velha =

Coordinates: 15°26′43″N 73°53′29″E

The St. Anthony's Chapel is a historic Roman Catholic chapel located in Goa Velha, Goa, India. It is dedicated to Anthony of Padua. The shrine draws people from various religious backgrounds who visit seeking comfort and healing.

== History ==
The chapel was set up by Dom Joao Antonio de Melo, a Portuguese nobleman who was visually impaired. Once, while traveling in a machila (a type of palanquin) from Agaçaim to Ribandar, the bearers of the machila stopped at midday to rest under a large mango tree near a small chapel operated by the Pilar Monastery. A statue of Saint Anthony was placed nearby on top of the trunk of a coconut tree. Seeing this, the bearers remarked in Konkani, "Hanga firgeancho sant asa" (transl. "a foreign saint is here"). Dom Joao then prayed here for the restoration of his vision, promising to build a chapel in honour of the saint if he was cured.

Dom Joao's eyesight began to improve soon after, during his return journey through the hills. He then asked to return to the statue, and his vision grew clearer and he was able to walk unassisted to his manor after reaching home. To fulfill his promise, he placed a request for architectural plans from Portugal to construct the chapel.

While local tradition dates the founding of the chapel to 15 May 1639, historical accounts indicate that the structure was likely completed around 1752. Upon its completion, a life-size statue of Saint Anthony was installed within the shrine. The chapel also has relics of Saint Anthony.

== Tradition ==
The life-size statue and the relics of Saint Anthony are considered miraculous by devotees, who are of diverse faiths and pray, offer candles, oil, and flower garlands, or express gratitude. This happens when, every Tuesday, the statue is brought out for a procession and veneration, a tradition that has been maintained for multiple generations.

The feast of Saint Anthony is celebrated on 13 June every year.

== Location ==
The chapel is situated along a route that historically linked the port of Agaçaim in Tiswadi to Old Goa, a path that has been in use since the era of the Kadamba dynasty.

== Maintenance ==
The upkeep and daily maintenance of the chapel are managed by a family residing adjacent to the building, who act as its caretakers.
