= St. Anthony's Church, Tel Aviv =

Church in Tel Aviv

Coordinates: 32.0496°N 34.7533°E

St. Anthony's Church
- כנסיית אנטוניוס הקדוש
- كنيسة القديس أنطونيوس البدواني
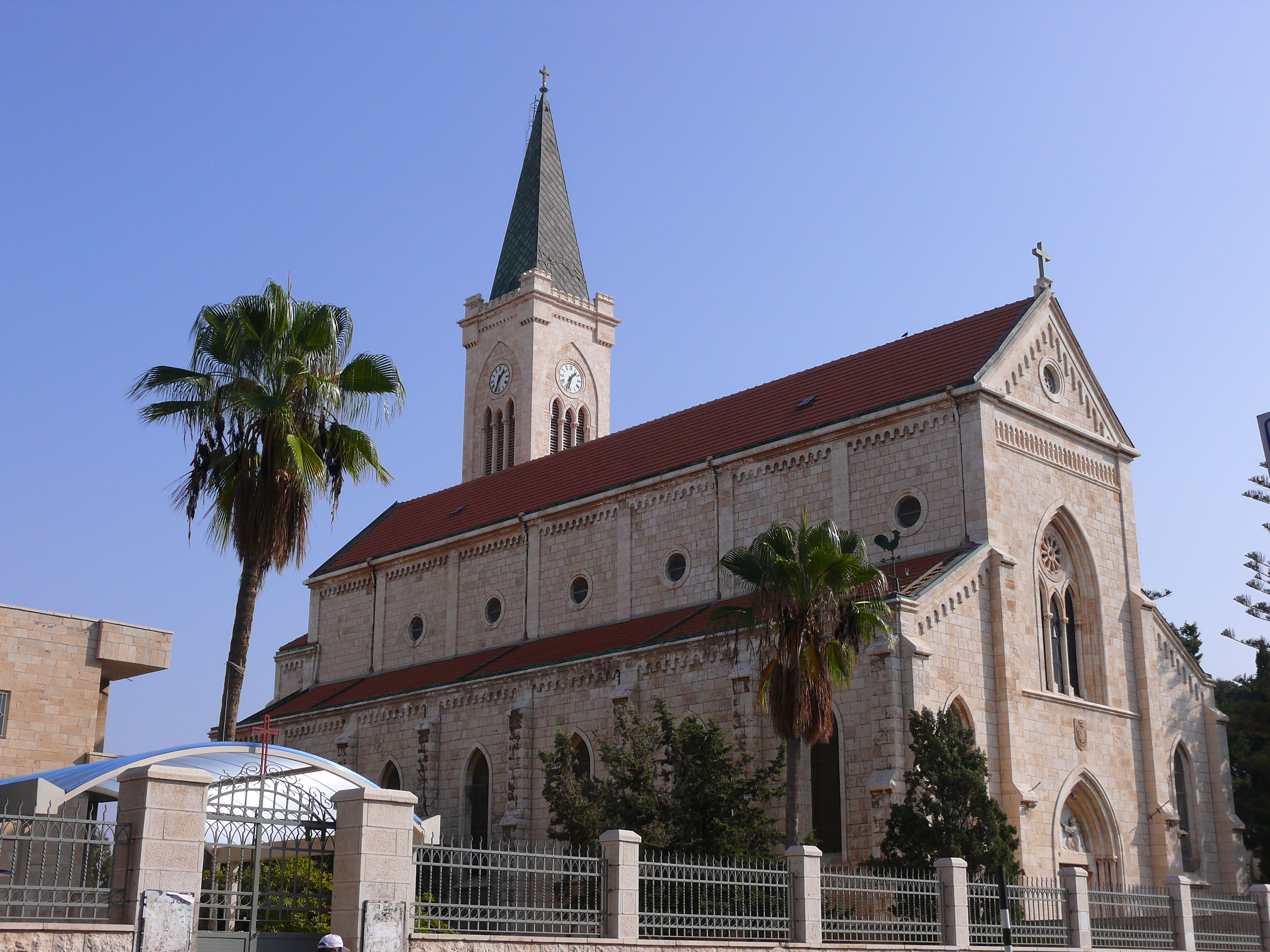
- St. Anthony's Church
- Location: Tel Aviv
- Country: Israel
- Denomination: Roman Catholic Church

History
- Dedication: Anthony of Padua

The St. Anthony of Padua Church (Arabic: كنيسة القديس أنطونيوس البدواني, Hebrew: כנסיית אנטוניוס הקדוש) or simply Church of St. Anthony (Arabic: كنيسة مار أنطون), is a religious building of the Catholic church located on Yefet Street in Jaffa, the southwestern district of the city of Tel Aviv in central Israel.

The temple stands out for its Gothic Revival style and its clock tower. It was named in honor of St. Anthony of Padua a priest of the Franciscan Order, Portuguese preacher and theologian, venerated as a saint and Doctor of the Church by Catholicism.

The structure was completed in 1932. The church is mainly used by foreign workers, mostly from the Philippines, and the local Catholic community. On the north side of the church is the Terra Sancta high school.

Religious services are offered in Arabic and English.

== See also ==
- Catholic Church in Israel
- St. Anthony's Church (disambiguation)

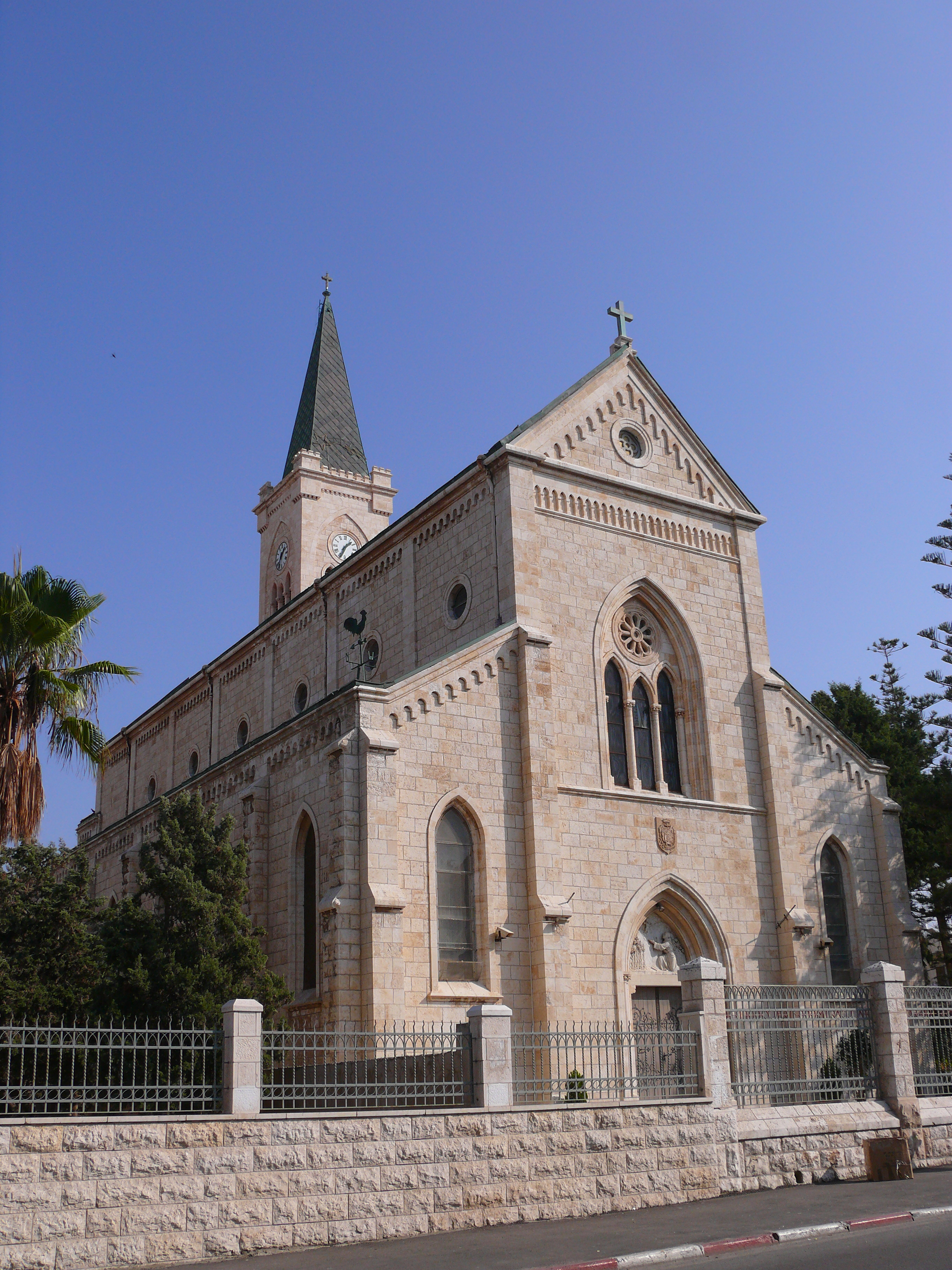
view of the facade
