= St. Anthony of Padua Church, Ljubljana =

Church of Saint Anthony of Padua
- Cerkev svetega Antona Padovanskega
- Church of Saint Anthony of Padua
- 46.04175833°N 14.47806111°E
- Location: Trieste road, Ljubljana
- Country: Slovenia
- Denomination: Roman Catholic
- Website: http://www.zupnija-vic.si/

History
- Status: parish church
- Founded: 1907
- Dedication: St. Anthony of Padua

Architecture
- Functional status: active
- Architect: Hans Pascher
- Style: Neorenaissance

Specifications
- Capacity: 2,000 people
- Length: 45 metres
- Width: 22 metres

Administration
- Archdiocese: Ljubljana
- Deanery: Ljubljana - Center
- Parish: Ljubljana - Vič

The Church of Saint Anthony of Padua, also Viš church, is a Neo-Renaissance church from the beginning of the 20th century in Ljubljana, Slovenia.

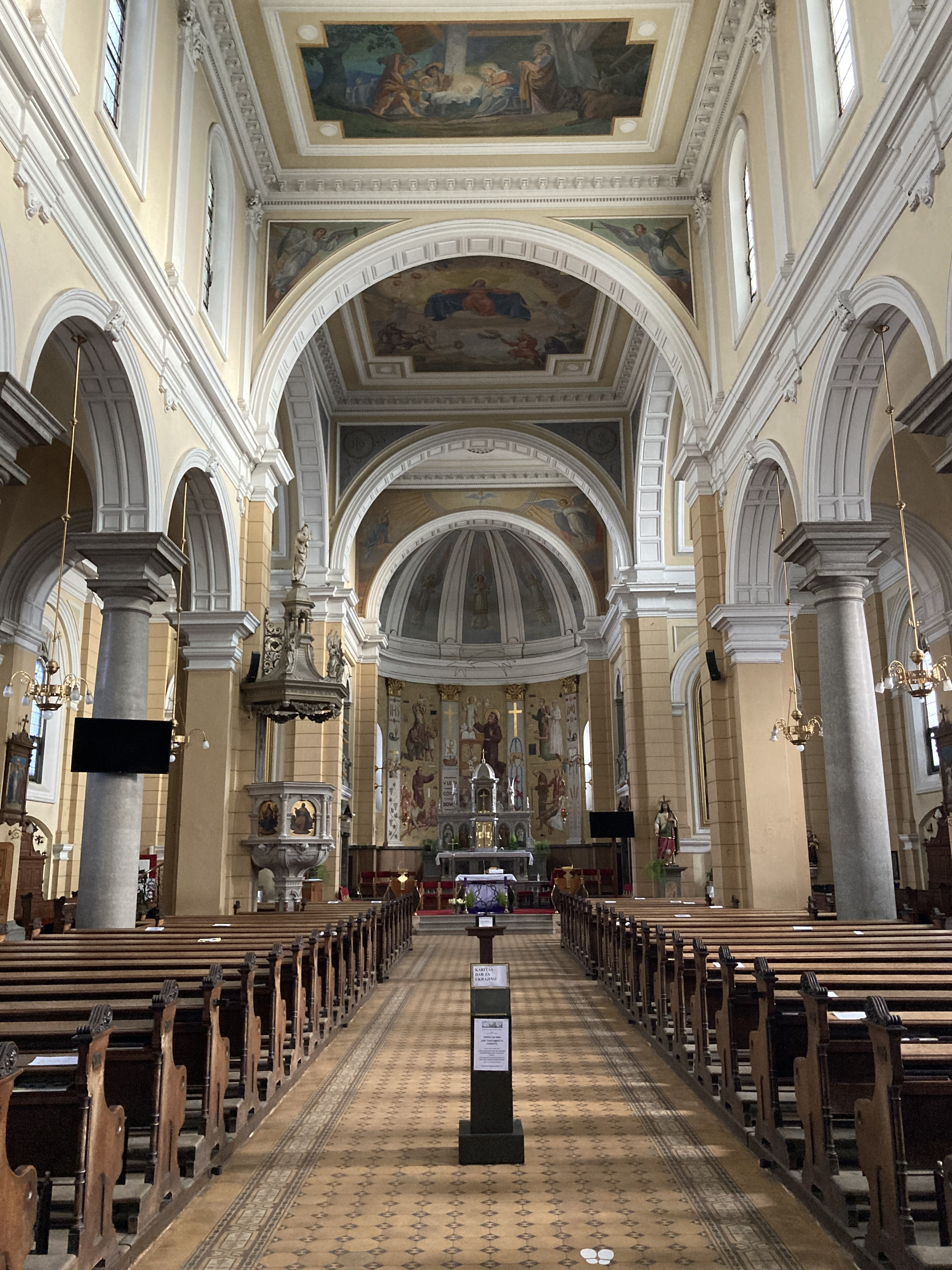
Parish Church of St. Anthony of Padua, Ljubljana, interior

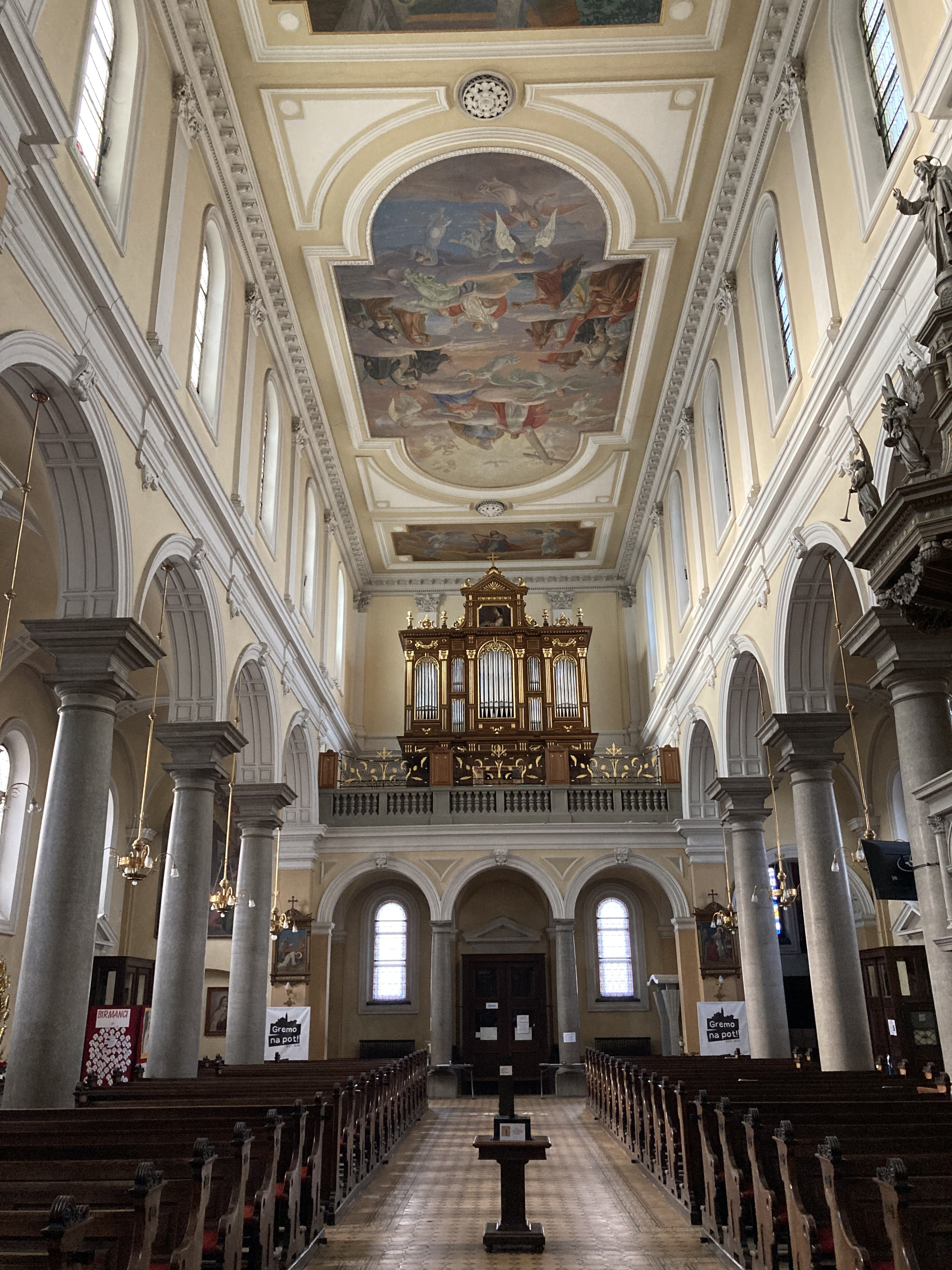
Parish Church of St. Anthony of Padua, Ljubljana, interior

== History ==
The parish church was built between 1906 and 1908 at the initiative of a Franciscan priest Hugolin Sattner. In 1904, Franciscan Father Placid Fabiani presented the idea of building a Franciscan monastery and a new church dedicated to St. Anthony of Padua, which was to become the parish church, to the Ljubljana Bishop Anton Bonaventura Jeglič.

The parish church has required numerous repairs, renovations and additions over time. The first major renovation was in 1991, when the facade of the church and the bell tower were renovated. The entire interior was renovated in 1966 and 1988. The central heating system was installed in the church between 1969 and 1970. The restoration and protection of the organ was carried out in 1954, when a railing was installed on the choir according to Plečnik's plan, and again in 1987.

== Frescoes on the church ceiling ==
On 26 March 1913, the commission for church art determined the paintings for individual panels on the church ceiling. When the painting began in June of the same year, problems arose due to the ceiling plaster made of gypsum, which cannot be painted on, so the entire ceiling plaster had to be replaced with new lime plaster. The painting of the ceiling was completed on 19 August 1915 and is the work of the Viennese academic painter Joseph Kleinert, Mr. Lipovšek and the Franciscan priest Blaž Farčnik.
