= Basilica of Saints Maurice and Lazarus =

Coordinates: 45.0749°N 7.6828°E

Basilica mauriziana Basilica magistrale della sacra Religione e Ordine dei Santi Maurizio e Lazzaro
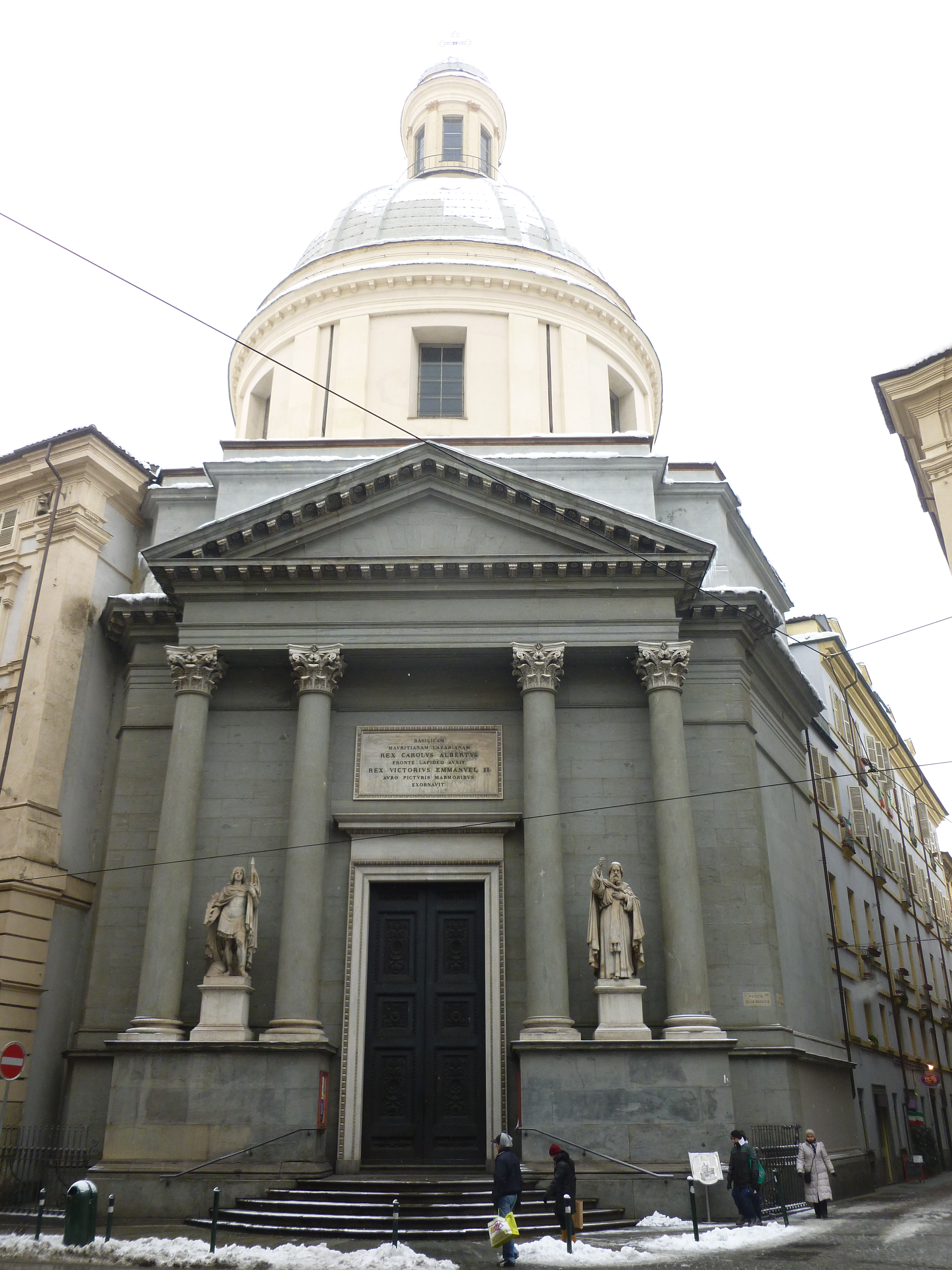
- Basilica mauriziana Basilica magistrale della sacra Religione e Ordine dei Santi Maurizio e Lazzaro
- Country: Italy
- Denomination: Catholic Church

Architecture
- Style: Baroque

Administration
- Archdiocese: Turin

The basilica of Saints Maurice and Lazzarus (Basilica dei Santi Maurizio e Lazzaro), is a church and minor basilica in Turin, Italy.

== History ==
Its history starts in the sixteenth century, when a previous romanic church from 1207 was restored and dedicated to Saint Paul. In 1729 it was made a basilica and became the church of the Order of Saints Maurice and Lazarus.

== Bibliography ==
- Paolo Boselli, L'Ordine Mauriziano dall'origine ai tempi presenti, Elzeviriana, Torino 1917
- Luciano Tamburini, Le chiese di Torino dal Rinascimento al Barocco, Le Bouquiniste, Torino 1968, pp. 250–263
- Istituto di Architettura Tecnica del Politecnico di Torino (responsabile Augusto Cavallari - Murat) (a cura di), Forma urbana ed Architettura nella Torino barocca, Vol. I, tomo II, UTET, Torino 1968
- Maurizio Marocco, La Basilica magistrale della sacra religione ed ordine militare de' SS. Maurizio e Lazzaro, Fredi Botta, 1860
