= St. Anthony's Church, Łódź-Łagiewniki =

Church in Lodz-Lagiewniki, Poland

St. Anthony of Padua Church
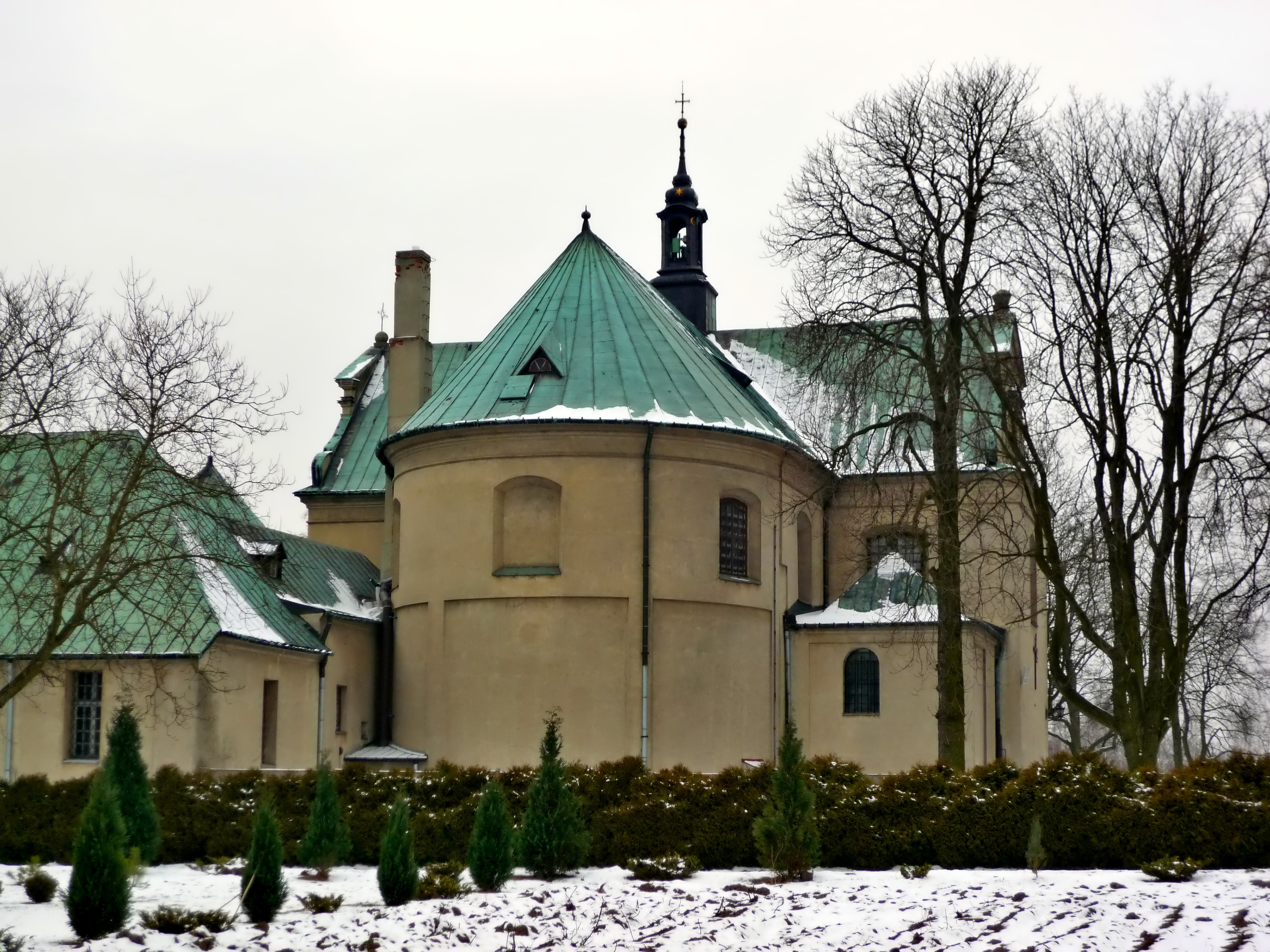
- Parish church of St. Anthony in winter

Religion
- Affiliation: Roman Catholic
- Diocese: Archdiocese of Łódź
- Year consecrated: May 1726
- Status: Parish church, sanctuary

Location
- Location: Okólna St. 185, Łódź-Łagiewniki, Poland
- Interactive map of St. Anthony of Padua Church
- Coordinates: 51°50′47″N 19°28′18″E

Architecture
- Style: Baroque
- Completed: 1723

St. Anthony of Padua Church in Łódź-Łagiewniki - Baroque Franciscan parish church, built in the first half of the 18th century, located in Łódź-Łagiewniki (central Poland). Since 1946 it belongs - along with the monastery - to the historic buildings of Łódź.

== History and nowadays ==
The church of St. Anthony of Padua was built between 1701 and 1723. It was consecrated on 16 May 1726, by Primate Teodor Potocki, Archbishop of Gniezno. For the next decades, the Franciscan church served as a center of worship for the local Catholics, especially for the pilgrims.

In January 1902, when the new parish was created in Łagiewniki, under the pastoral care of the local Franciscans, the church of St. Anthony of Padua become a parish church. Nowadays, the Franciscan church is known as one of the oldest Baroque buildings in Łódź, and not only as a place of prayer. Every summer musical concerts are organized here, and many young couples decide to arrange a wedding ceremony here.

== Architecture of the church ==
The Baroque church was built on a plan of the sign of the Latin cross. The facade of the church is two storied. Inside the church there are many valuable elements: main altar (Baroque) of St. Anthony of Padua, chapel of blessed Raphael Chyliński with his coffin, side altars (renovated), Baroque wooden ambo with St. Francis of Assisi painting, etc. Also, there are some valuable paintings and chasubles in the sacristy of the church.

== Small photo gallery ==
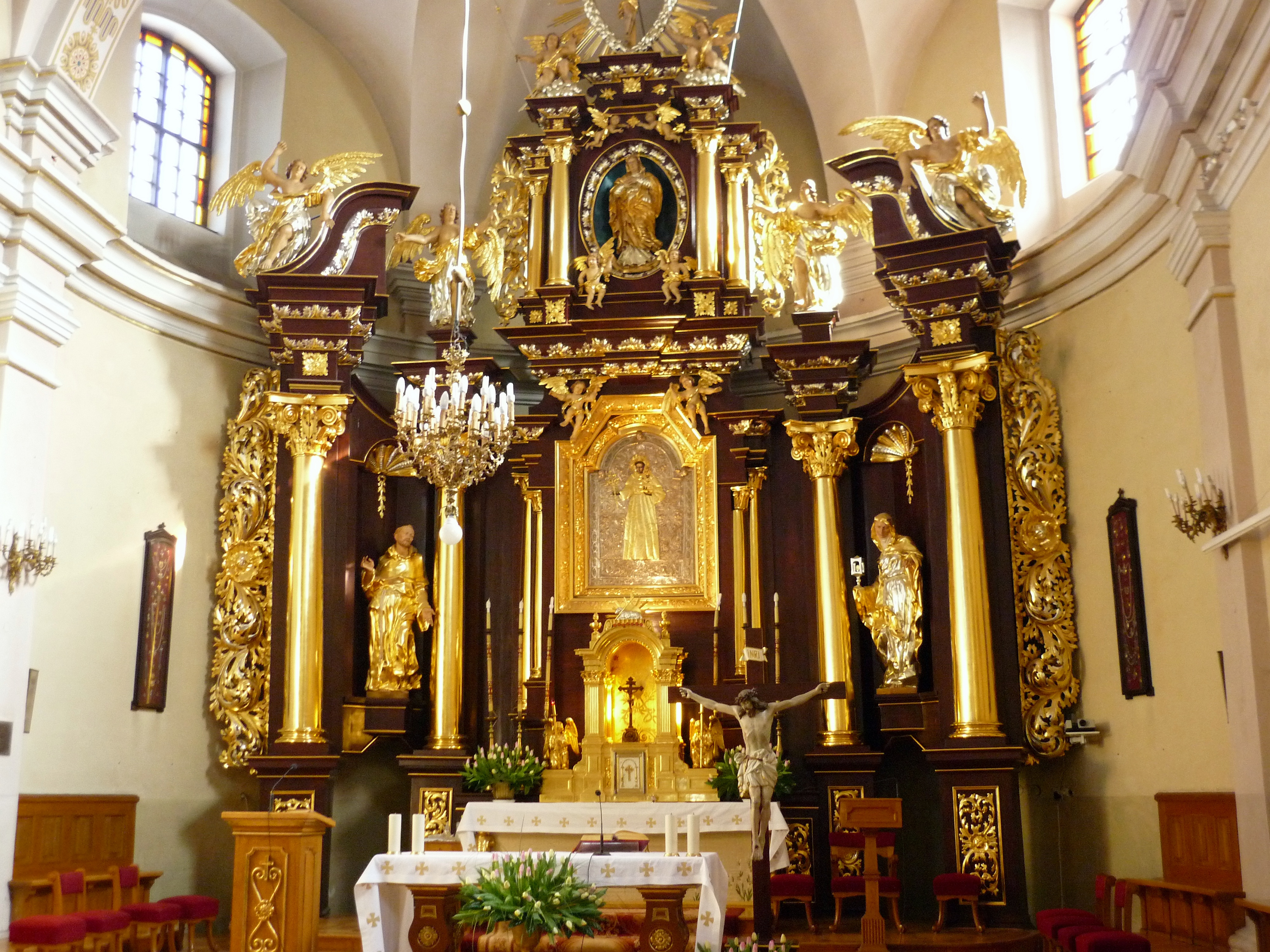
Main altar of St. Anthony church in Łódź

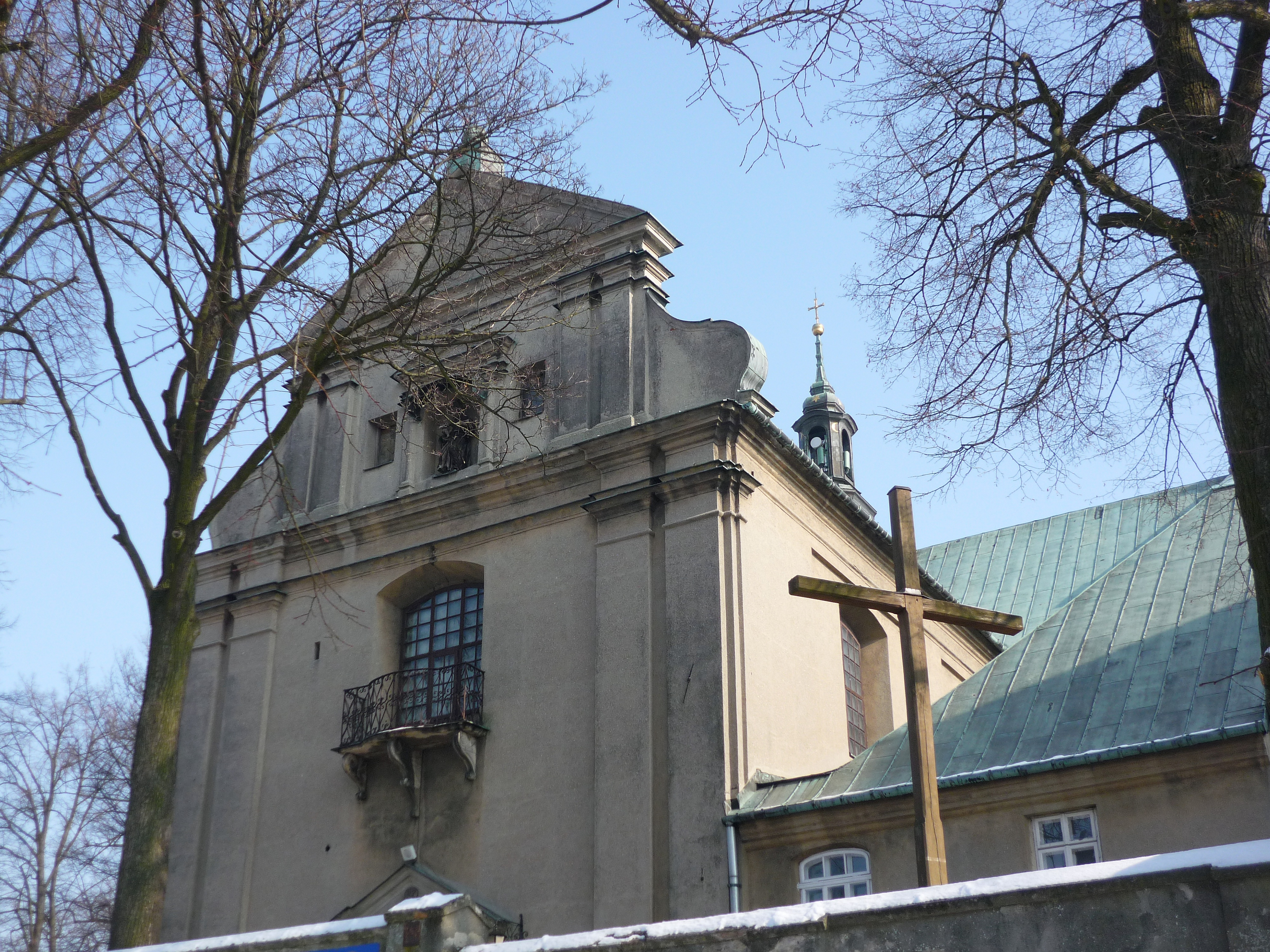
View from the west side (facade) of the church

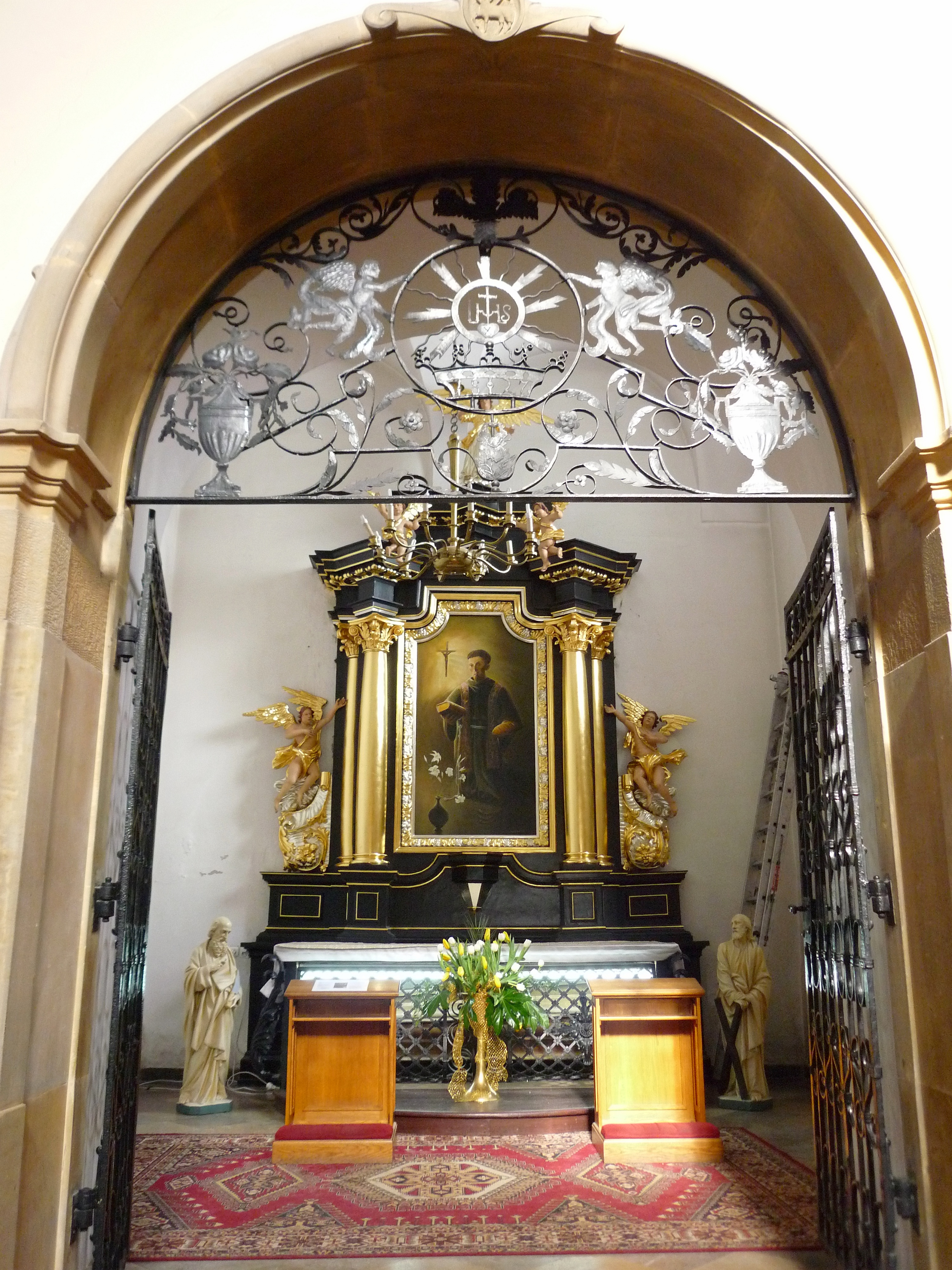
The chapel of blessed Raphael Chylinski

== Source materials ==
- Piotr Mielczarek OFMConv., Łagiewniki - kościół i klasztor Franciszkanów (in Polish). Wydawnictwo Ojców Franciszkanów, Niepokalanów, 1995, ISBN 83-86412-15-1
- Łódź-Łagiewniki location, St. Anthony of Padua Church, etc. (website in English)
- The history of the sanctuary and the church of St. Anthony in Łódź-Łagiewniki (website in Polish)
