= Madonna del Pilone, Turin =

Church of Madonna del Pilone
- Chiesa della Madonna del Pilone
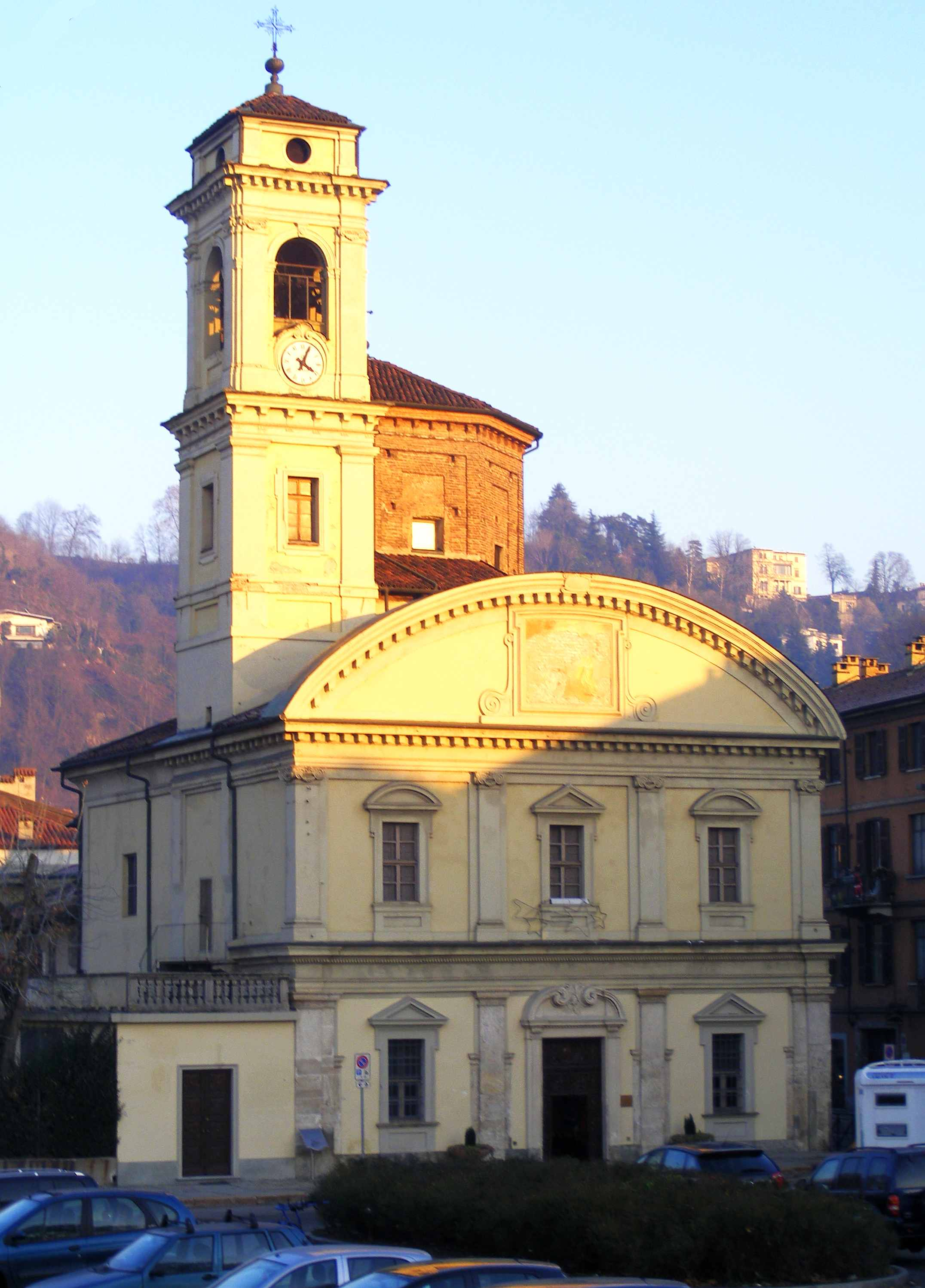
- Façade of the church

- Map of Turin
- 45.0700°N 7.7240°E
- Denomination: Roman Catholic Church

Architecture
- Groundbreaking: 1644
- Completed: 1645

Administration
- Archdiocese: Turin

The church (or Sanctuary) of the Madonna del Pilone is a seventeenth-century church in Turin, Italy.

== Background ==
Built in 1645, the church was constructed by wish of the Queen Regent Christine Marie of France to remember the miraculous rescue from the previous year of a girl from the river. The miracle was attributed to the intervention of an image of the Virgin of the Annunciation, which was placed on a votive pillar. The painting became such an item of devotion, that this church was built at the site, enlarged in 1779, and furnished with a baptistery in 1807. Repeated reconstructions have altered the interior, and the church retains only some of the original decoration consisting of the stuccoes attributed to Giovanni Andrea Casella and the cupola frescoes by Bartolomeo Guidobono. The main altar houses the miraculous icon dating from 1587, now thoroughly restored.

== Miracle ==
The miracle for which the church was built recalls that the riverbank nearby once housed a number of mills. A flour miller's daughter fell into the river at dusk. Her Mother, hearing her cries, but unable to see where she was to rescue her, knelt before a nearby shrine built next to the mill, depicting the Annunciation of the Blessed Virgin. Legend holds a miraculous shaft of light illuminated the spot where her daughter was, and allowed her to be rescued by neighbors. News of the miracle led to the erection of a church by 1645, which became a Parish church March 2, 1807. The picture of the Madonna behind the main altar recalls the event.

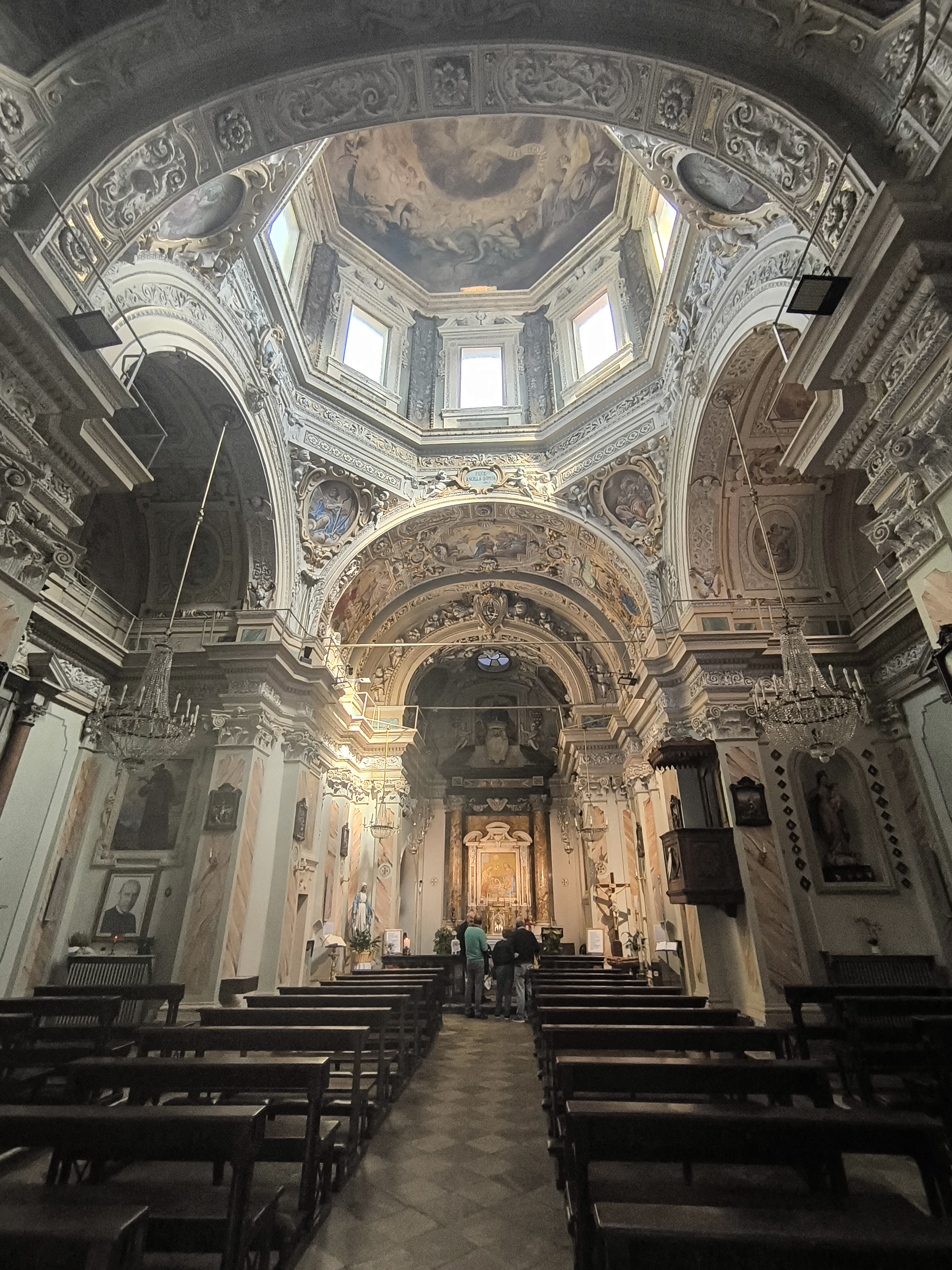
Interior towards the main autel
