= Santa Giulia, Turin =

Church of Saint Julia
- Chiesa di Santa Giulia
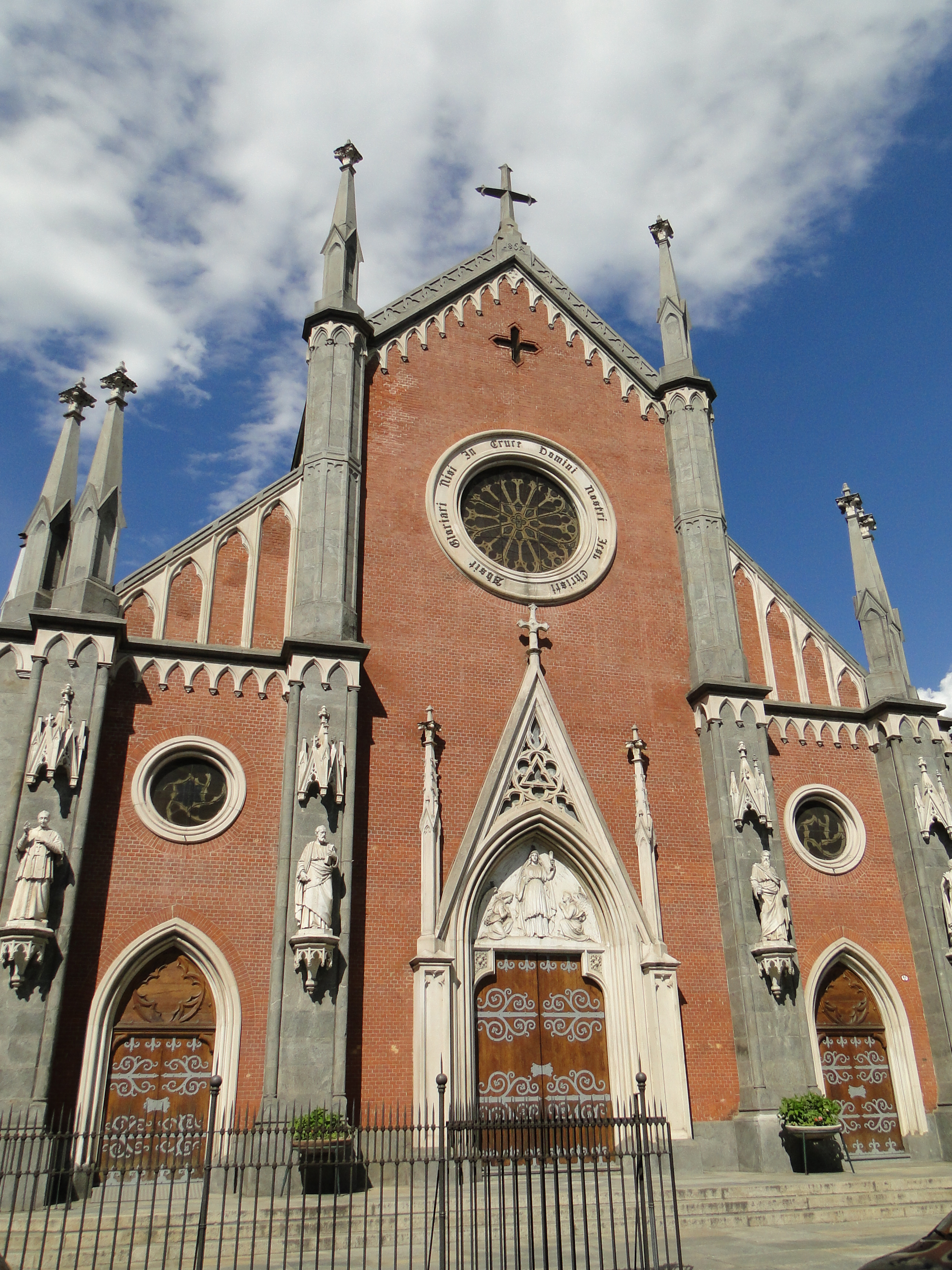
- Façade of the church

- Map of Turin
- 45.06964°N 7.69945°E
- Country: Italy
- Denomination: Roman Catholic Church

History
- Dedication: Saint Julia of Corsica

Architecture
- Architect: Giovanni Battista Ferrante
- Style: Gothic revival
- Groundbreaking: 1862
- Completed: 1866

Administration
- Archdiocese: Turin

Clergy
- Priest: Don Gianluca Attanasio

The Church of Saint Julia (Italian: Chiesa di Santa Giulia) is a Roman Catholic place of worship located in the city of Turin, Italy.

It was built by order of the Marquise Giulia Falletti di Barolo, based on an 1862 project by the architect Giovanni Battista Ferrante.

== History ==
The church was built in 1862 under the patronage of philanthropist Juliette Colbert de Barolo, who donated 500'000 Italian lira for its construction. Architect Alessandro Antonelli was initially interested in designing the church, and wished for it to be dedicated to Luke the Evangelist, but Colbert stated that she would not go through with her donation unless the church were to be designed by Giovanni Battista Ferrante and dedicated to Saint Julia of Corsica.

The building was damaged by Allied bombardments during World War II, in 1943.
