= St. Anthony's Catholic Church (Shenzhen) =

- 天主教深圳圣安多尼堂
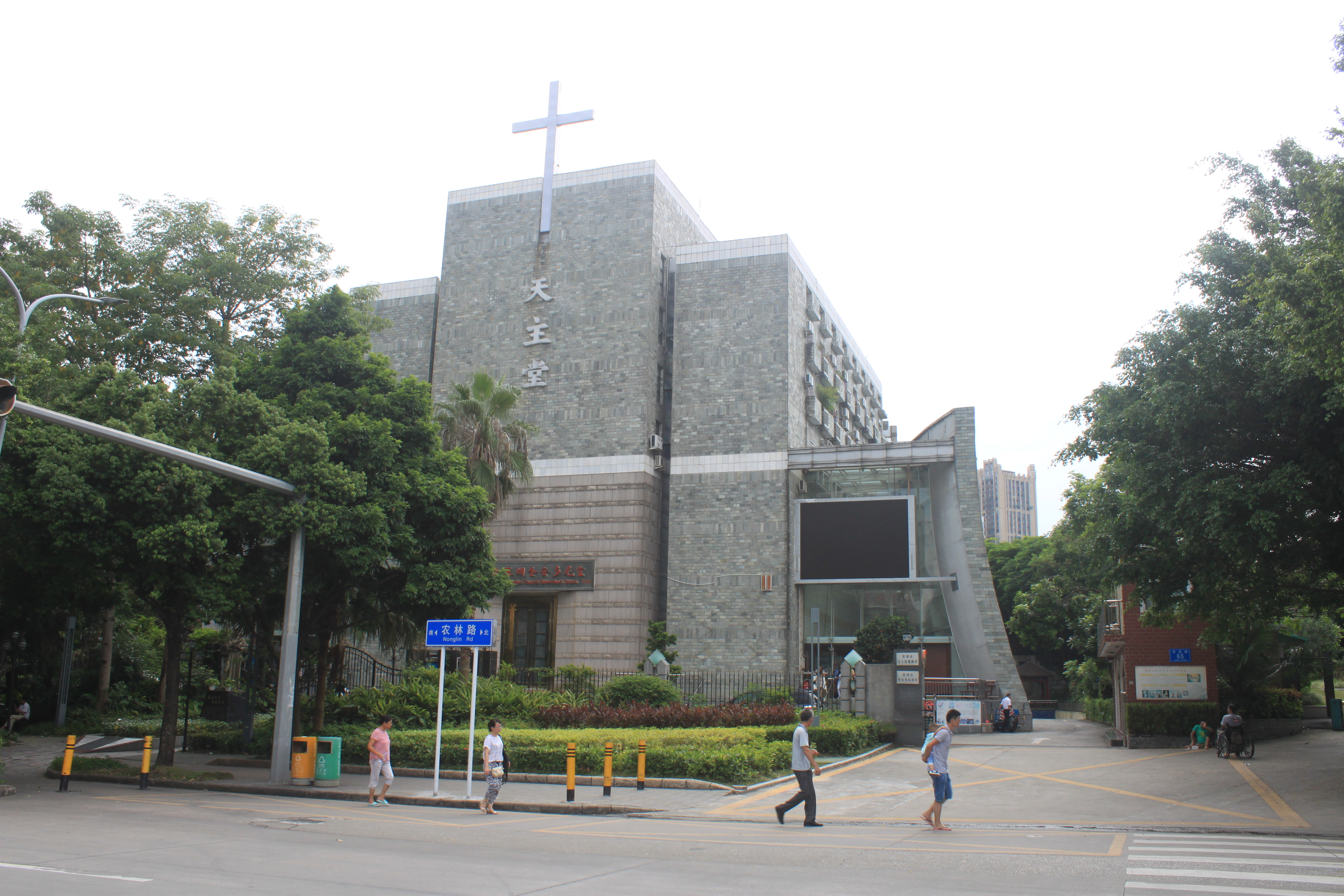
- St. Anthony's Catholic Church

- Location in Guangdong St. Anthony's Catholic Church (China)
- 22°33′02″N 114°01′15″E
- Location: Futian District, Shenzhen, Guangdong
- Country: China
- Denomination: Roman Catholic
- Website: www.szsadn.com

History
- Status: Parish church
- Founded: 1998

Architecture
- Functional status: Active
- Architectural type: Church building
- Groundbreaking: April 1998
- Completed: December 2001

Specifications
- Materials: Granite

Administration
- Province: Guangdong
- Archdiocese: Canton

Clergy
- Archbishop: Joseph Gan Jun-qiu
- Priest: Zhang Tianlu (张天路)

St. Anthony's Catholic Church
- Traditional Chinese: 天主教深圳聖安多尼堂
- Simplified Chinese: 天主教深圳圣安多尼堂
Transcriptions
Standard Mandarin
- Hanyu Pinyin: Tiānzhǔjiào Shēnzhèn Shèng'ānduōnítáng
Yue: Cantonese
- Jyutping: tin1 zyu2 gaau3 sam1 zan3 sing3 on1 do1 nei4 tong4

St. Anthony's Catholic Church (Chinese: 天主教深圳圣安多尼堂) is a Roman Catholic church in Shenzhen, Guangdong, China.

== History ==
The church building covers an area of 3,944.8 square metres (0.9748 acres), and is located along Nonglin Road, Futian District, Shenzhen. The foundation of the church was laid in April 1998, and the church was completed in December 2001. Building the church took three years and eight months. The design of St. Anthony's Catholic Church aims to symbolize the spirit of Catholicism in the Shenzhen Special Economic Zone. The construction of the church required the efforts of a large number of Catholics.

St. Anthony's Catholic Church is an international parish, which each Sunday at 11:00am provides the Holy Mass in English for Catholics from overseas who live and work in Shenzhen.

== Parish ==
The church has four Sunday Masses (主日弥撒), at 9:00 am on Sunday, and 11:00 am on Sunday (English), and 7:00pm on Sunday (English), and 7:00 pm on Saturday. It also has weekday Masses (平日弥撒) at 7:00am from Monday to Saturday.

== Transportation ==
- Take subway Line 2 (Shekou Line) to get off at Qiaoxiang Station. Getting out from Exit A and walk 850 m (2,790 ft) to reach the church.

== List of priests ==
Took office	Left office	Name	Native name	Notes
December 1993	December 2002	Ren Lijun	任力军	
December 2002	December 2004	Yang Ke	杨科	
December 2004	December 2007	Han Wensheng	韩文生	
December 2007	December 2011	Zhang Tianlu	张天路	
February 2011	April 2016	Feng Guoxin	冯国新	
April 2016	October 2019	Liu Yongbin	刘永斌	
December 2019		Zhang Tianlu	张天路	
