= Sant'Agostino, Turin =

Church of Saint Augustine
- Chiesa di Sant'Agostino
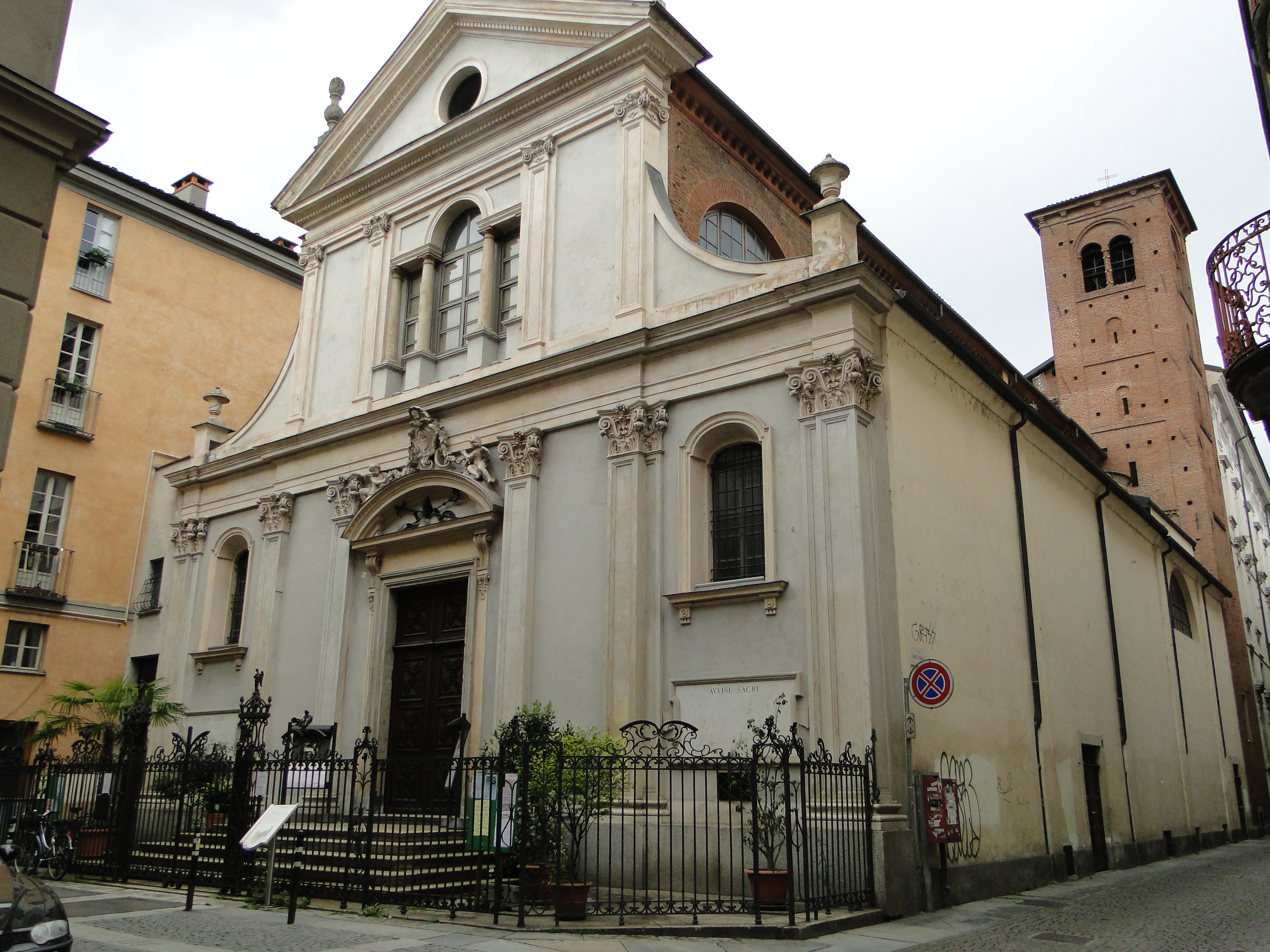
- Façade of the church

- Map of Turin
- 45.075693°N 7.679923°E
- Country: Italy
- Denomination: Roman Catholic Church

History
- Dedication: Augustine of Hippo
- Dedicated: 1551
- Consecrated: 1643

Administration
- Archdiocese: Turin

The Church of Saint Augustine (Italian: Chiesa di Sant'Agostino) is a Roman Catholic place of worship located in the city of Turin, Italy.

== History ==
While it is unknown when the building was erected, the first written record mentioning the Church of Sant'Agostino dates back to 1047. The church was initially dedicated to Saint Philip the Apostle and Saint Jacob. It was then dedicated to Augustine of Hippo in 1551, when it was donated to the order of the Discalced Augustinians. The church was consecrated in 1643.

Sant'Agostino was damaged by Allied bombardments three times throughout World War II, in 1942 and 1943.
