= Sant'Antonio di Padova, Turin =

Sanctuary of Saint Anthony of Padua
- Santuario di Sant'Antonio di Padova
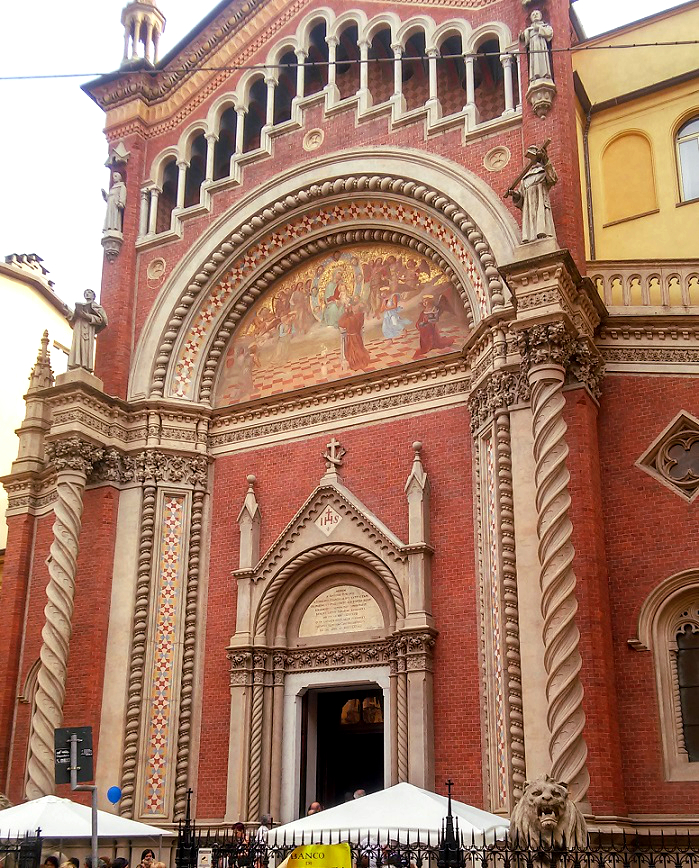
- Façade of the church

- Map of Turin
- 45.06845°N 7.66579°E
- Country: Italy
- Denomination: Roman Catholic Church

History
- Dedication: Anthony of Padua

Architecture
- Architect: Alberto Porta
- Style: Gothic Revival, Romanesque Revival
- Groundbreaking: 1883
- Completed: 1887

Administration
- Archdiocese: Turin

The Sanctuary of Saint Anthony of Padua (Italian: Santuario di Sant'Antonio da Padova), also known as the Church of Saint Anthony of Padua (Italian: Chiesa di Sant'Antonio di Padova) is a Roman Catholic place of worship located in the city of Turin, Italy.

== History ==
The sanctuary was built in 1883, with the purpose of hosting Piedmontese friars from the Order of Friars Minor who lost their housing due to the approval of the Siccardi Laws in 1866 in the then Kingdom of Sardinia. Architect Alberto Porta supervised the construction of the sanctuary, and opted for a mix of Gothic Revival and Romanesque Revival styles. Since its construction, the sanctuary has offered a soup kitchen service for the poor.

The building was damaged by Allied bombardments during World War II, in 1942 and 1943.
