= St Anthony of Padua, Oxford =

Catholic church in Oxford, England

St Anthony of Padua
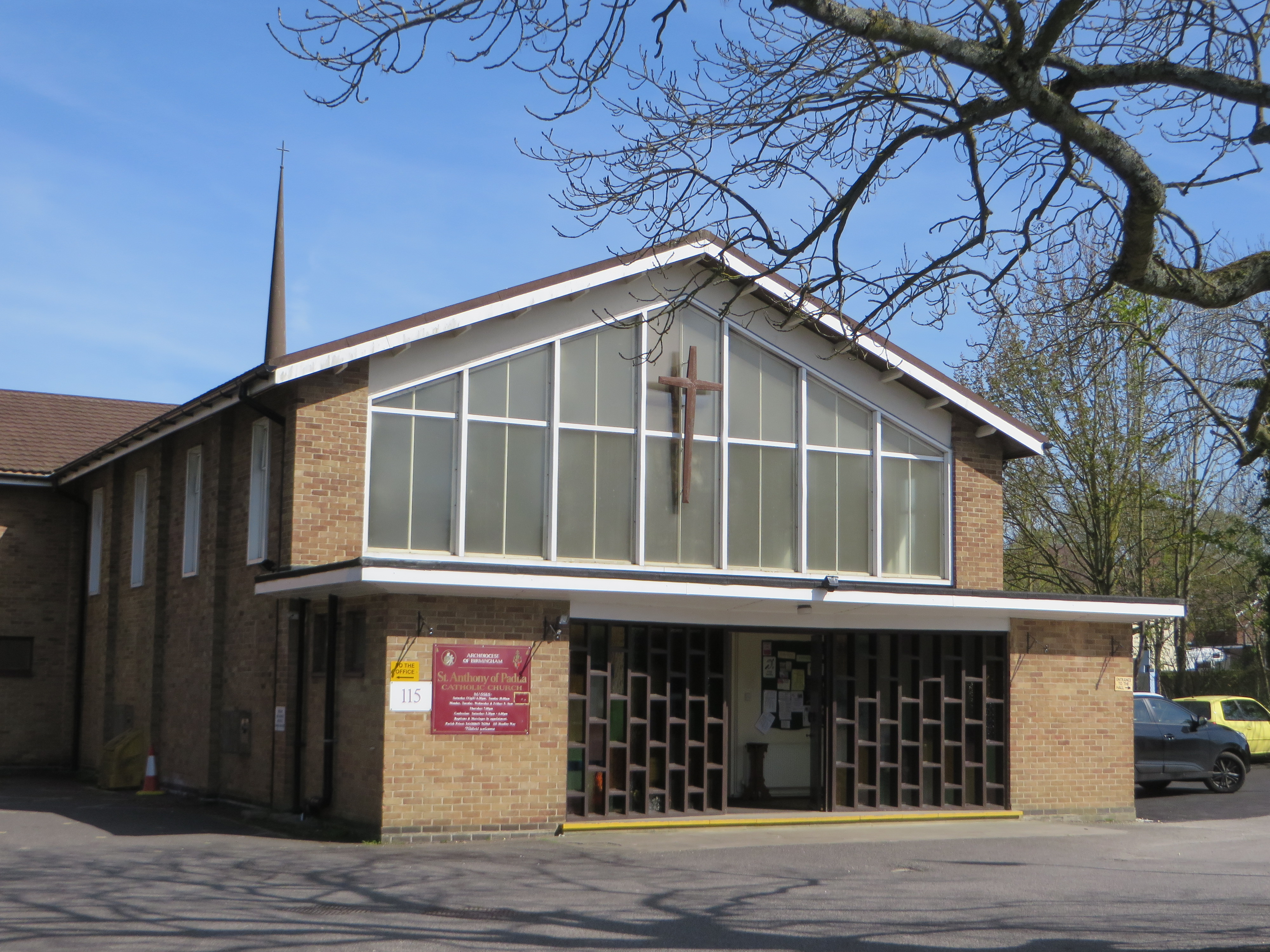
- Front view of the church
- St Anthony of Padua
- 51°45′50.1″N 1°13′31.0″W
- OS grid reference: SP 53561 07531
- Location: 115 Headley Way, Headington, Oxford, Oxfordshire OX3 7SS
- Country: England
- Denomination: Roman Catholic Church
- Website: stanthonyofpadua.org.uk

History
- Founded: 1960
- Dedication: Saint Anthony of Padua

Architecture
- Style: Brick-built

Administration
- Archdiocese: Birmingham
- Deanery: Oxford (North)

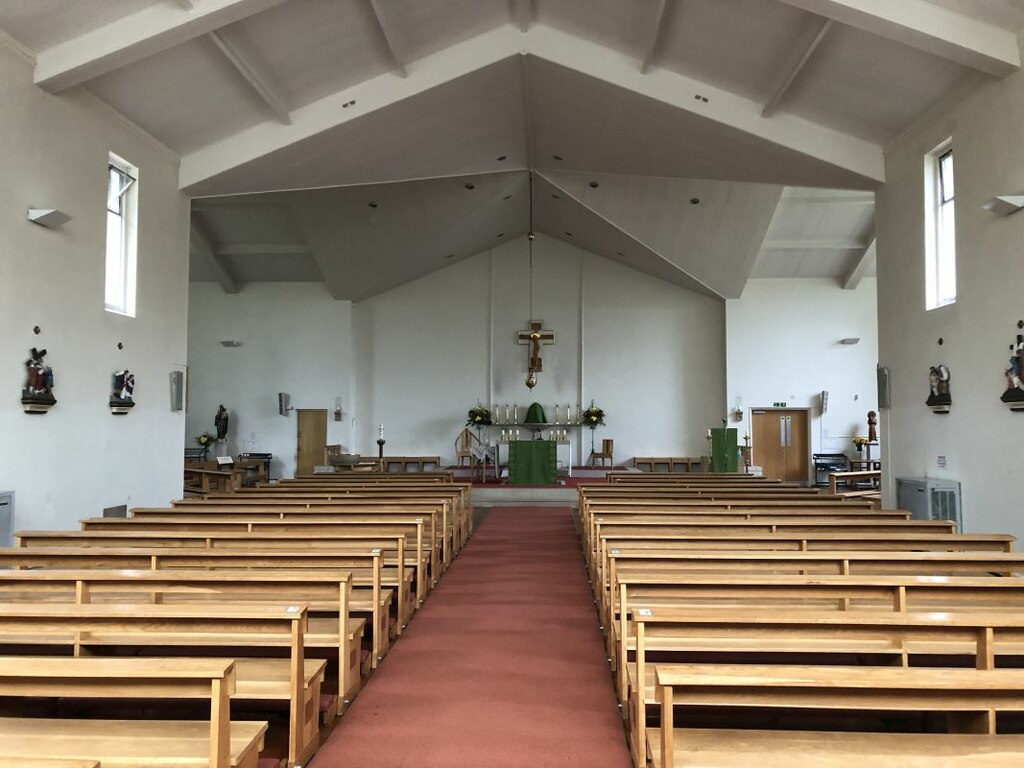
The interior

The Church of St Anthony of Padua, Oxford is a yellow brick-built Catholic church in suburb of Headington, east Oxford, Oxfordshire, England. The church building is located in Headley Way.

== History ==
The church was built in 1960 and designed by Jennings, Homer & Lynch. J.R.R. Tolkien was a parishioner here when he lived in Sandfield Road nearby. He was also a benefactor and his Requiem Mass was held here on 6 September 1973.

== See also ==
- Roman Catholic Archdiocese of Birmingham
