= Saül, French Guiana =

Commune in French Guiana, France

Saül
- Commune
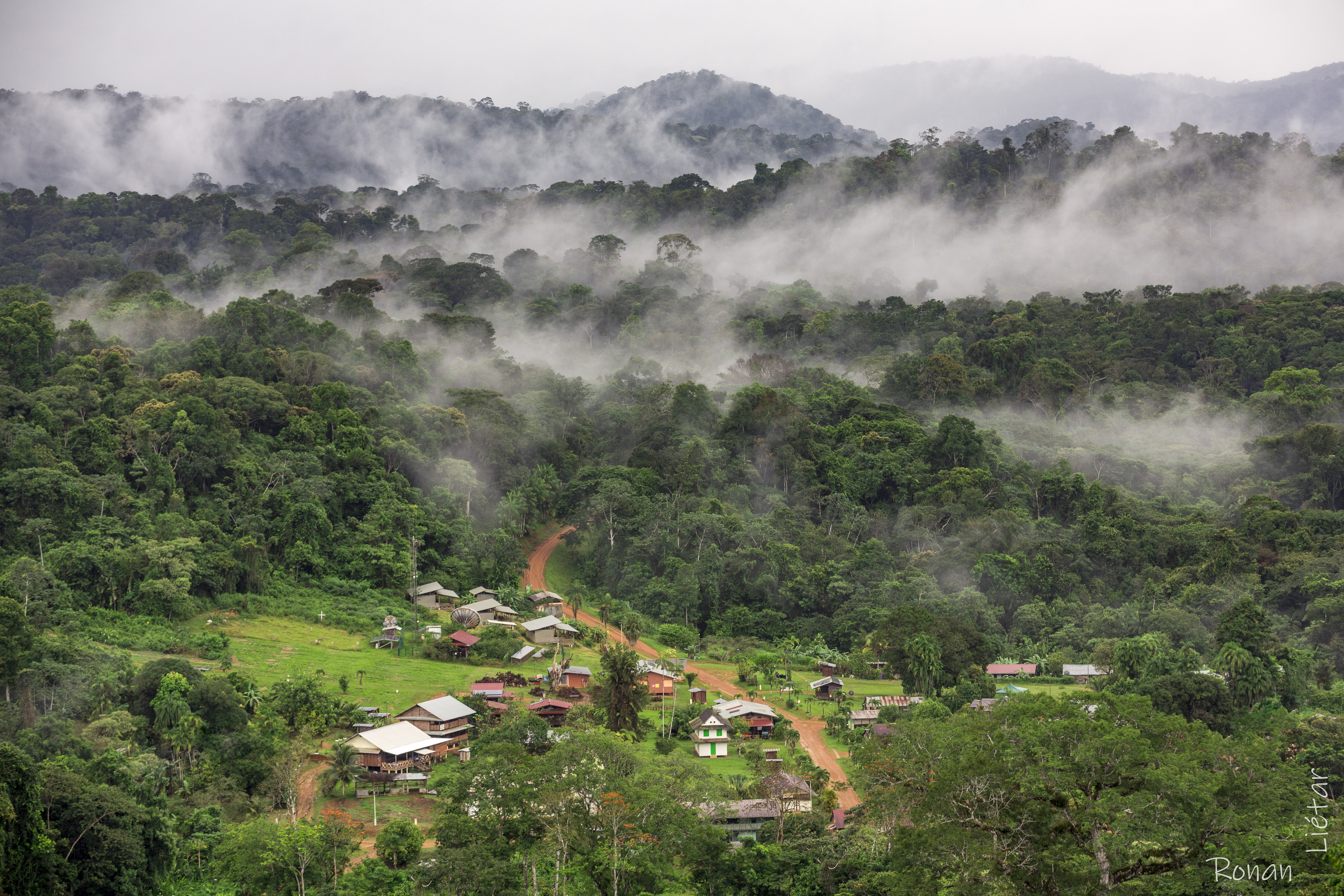
- Aerial view of Saül

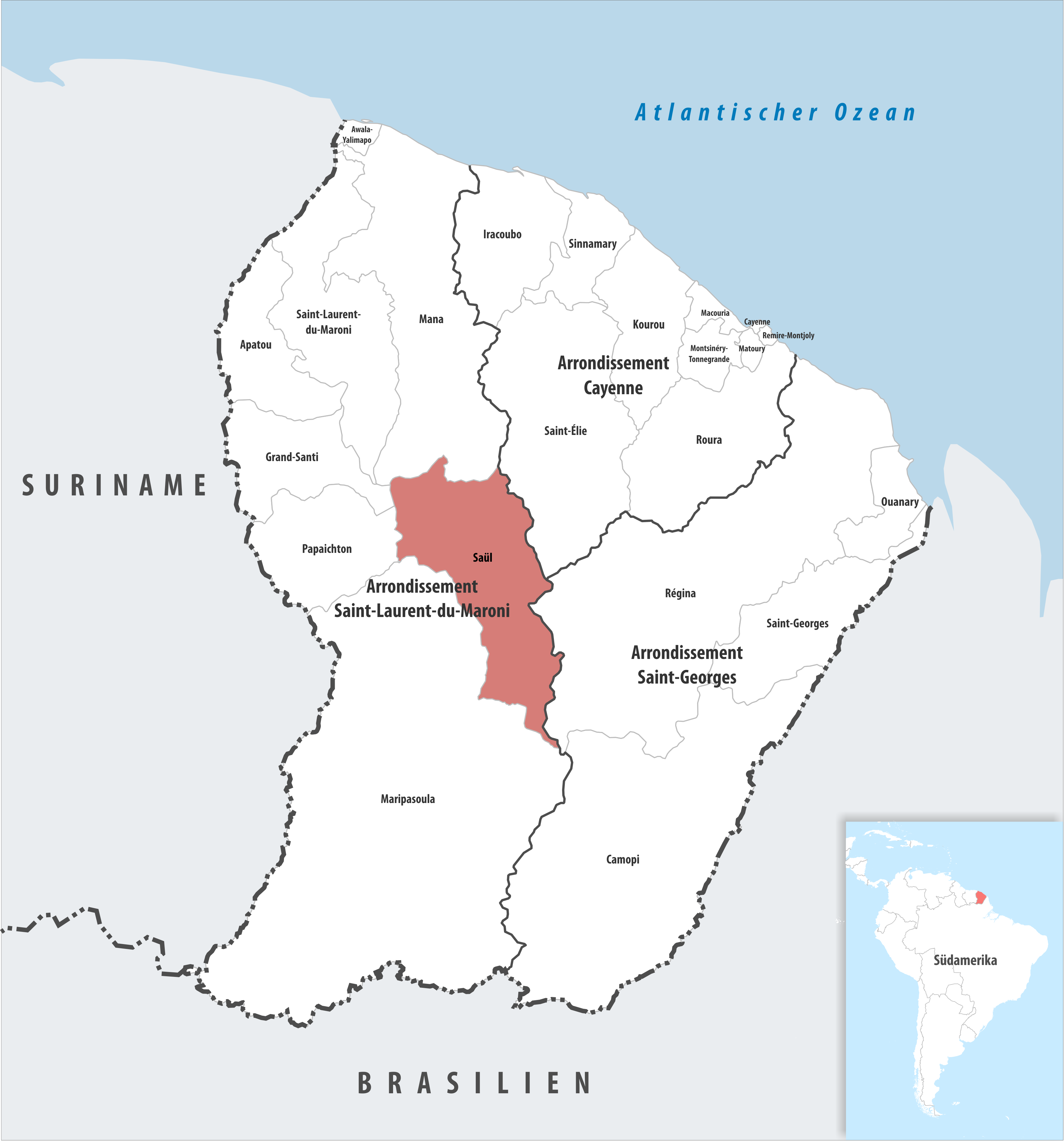
- Location of the commune (in red) within French Guiana
- Location of Saül
- Coordinates: 3°37′22″N 53°12′34″W
- Country: France
- Overseas region and department: French Guiana
- Arrondissement: Saint-Laurent-du-Maroni
- Intercommunality: Ouest Guyanais

Government
  - Mayor (2020–2026): Marie-Hélène Charles
- Area^{1}: 4,475 km^{2} (1,728 sq mi)
- Population (2023): 277
  - Density: 0.0619/km^{2} (0.160/sq mi)
- Time zone: UTC−03:00
- INSEE/Postal code: 97352 /97314
- ^{1} French Land Register data, which excludes lakes, ponds, glaciers > 1 km^{2} (0.386 sq mi or 247 acres) and river estuaries.

Saül (French pronunciation: [sa.yl]; French Guianese Creole: Sayil) is a commune of French Guiana, an overseas region and department of France located in South America. It is the most sparsely populated commune of French Guiana.

It is very remote, surrounded by dense rainforest; because there are no roads to the town, it can only be reached via the Saül Airport. The village is located in the centre of French Guiana where springs give rise to three major rivers: the Mana, the Inini, and the Approuague.

The principal activities in the town are gold mining and trekking through the many rainforest trails. There is a tourist camp and a hotel in the town.

== History ==
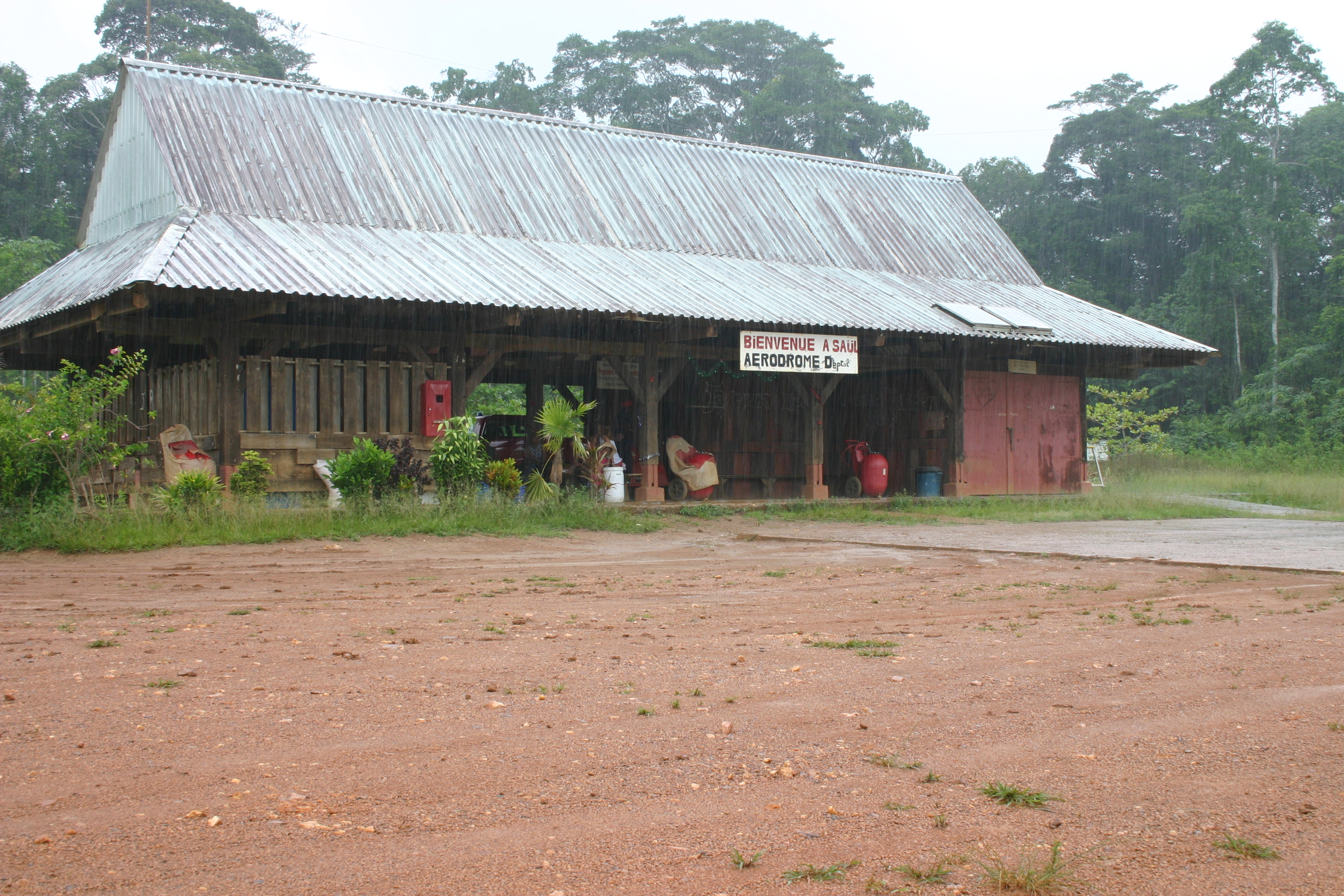
Saül's airfield: the terminal building.

In 1910, Sahul from Saint Lucia arrived in the area and discovered gold. His discovery resulted in the establishment of the village of Saül whose population peaked at 800 people. Between 1930 and 1946, Saül was part of the Territory of Inini which did not provide education for its inhabitants. Saül was one of the first villages to receive a primary school. In 1952, a 150 kilometer track was constructed between Saül via Bélizon to the road leading to Cayenne by the Guinese Mining Bureau in order to develop the gold mine at Saül. The cost of the track was more expensive than the gold production which had started to decline, and was abandoned in 1960.

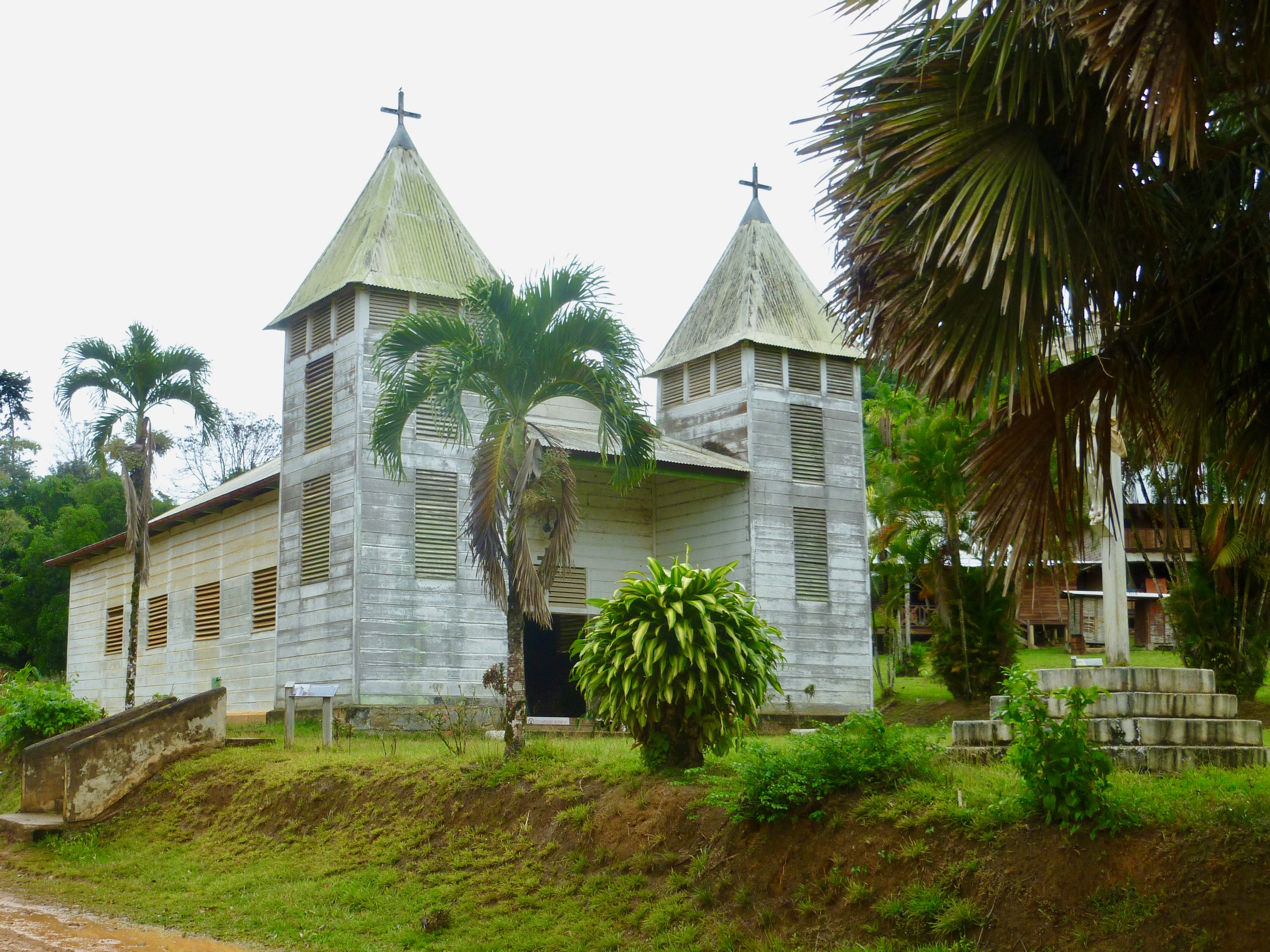
St. Anthony of Padua Church

In 1962, the St. Anthony of Padua Church was consecrated. The church was declared a monument in 1993. The village had less than 100 inhabitants in the early 21st century.

== Economy ==
Saül is situated in the Amazonian Forest and is not connected to any road system. Saül's economy is based on eco and scientific tourism. Tourists can reach the town by plane thanks to Air Guyane Express. In July 2008, the REXMA corporation made an application for a gold mining permit. Due to environmental concerns, the French Government postponed the decision in October 2008. On 26 October 2012, Arnaud Montebourg, the French Industry Minister, approved the permit. The Mayor and the council were shocked by this decision as they are promoting and living off eco tourism.

The inhabitants of Saül, the botanist Scott Mori, politicians such as Chantal Berthelot and José Gaillou, and many organizations like IUCN, Fédération Guyane Nature Environment and Rainforest Rescue protested against the decision to reward the permit. Opposition grew from the possibility that the mine would cause the partial destruction of the Guiana Amazonian Park and the decline of water quality.

== Climate ==
Like most of French Guiana, Saül has a hot, humid and very wet tropical rainforest climate (Köppen Af) with a short dry season centred upon September and October when the Intertropical Convergence Zone lies furthest north.

Climate data for Saül (1991−2020 normals, extremes 1954−present)
Month	Jan	Feb	Mar	Apr	May	Jun	Jul	Aug	Sep	Oct	Nov	Dec	Year
Record high °C (°F)	34.9 (94.8)	35.6 (96.1)	36.6 (97.9)	36.9 (98.4)	35.5 (95.9)	35.6 (96.1)	36.0 (96.8)	36.5 (97.7)	37.0 (98.6)	37.6 (99.7)	37.0 (98.6)	37.0 (98.6)	37.6 (99.7)
Mean daily maximum °C (°F)	31.2 (88.2)	31.1 (88.0)	31.6 (88.9)	31.8 (89.2)	31.7 (89.1)	32.1 (89.8)	32.6 (90.7)	33.4 (92.1)	34.3 (93.7)	34.5 (94.1)	33.9 (93.0)	32.1 (89.8)	32.5 (90.5)
Daily mean °C (°F)	26.4 (79.5)	26.4 (79.5)	26.7 (80.1)	27.0 (80.6)	26.9 (80.4)	26.7 (80.1)	26.6 (79.9)	27.1 (80.8)	27.6 (81.7)	27.7 (81.9)	27.6 (81.7)	26.8 (80.2)	27.0 (80.6)
Mean daily minimum °C (°F)	21.5 (70.7)	21.7 (71.1)	21.8 (71.2)	22.1 (71.8)	22.1 (71.8)	21.3 (70.3)	20.6 (69.1)	20.8 (69.4)	20.8 (69.4)	20.9 (69.6)	21.2 (70.2)	21.5 (70.7)	21.4 (70.5)
Record low °C (°F)	15.5 (59.9)	16.0 (60.8)	16.5 (61.7)	16.7 (62.1)	17.0 (62.6)	16.5 (61.7)	16.5 (61.7)	16.4 (61.5)	16.0 (60.8)	15.5 (59.9)	16.9 (62.4)	16.0 (60.8)	15.5 (59.9)
Average precipitation mm (inches)	241.2 (9.50)	259.7 (10.22)	263.1 (10.36)	328.0 (12.91)	351.7 (13.85)	264.9 (10.43)	200.5 (7.89)	135.2 (5.32)	72.1 (2.84)	71.1 (2.80)	125.6 (4.94)	209.6 (8.25)	2,522.7 (99.32)
Average precipitation days (≥ 1.0 mm)	22.7	21.5	21.7	22.4	26.5	23.8	20.3	14.1	8.0	7.8	12.0	21.1	221.7
Source: Météo-France

== See also ==
- Communes of French Guiana
