= Church of St. Anthony of Padua, Kokshetau =

St Anthony of Padua's Church
- Әулие Энтони Падуя шіркеуі
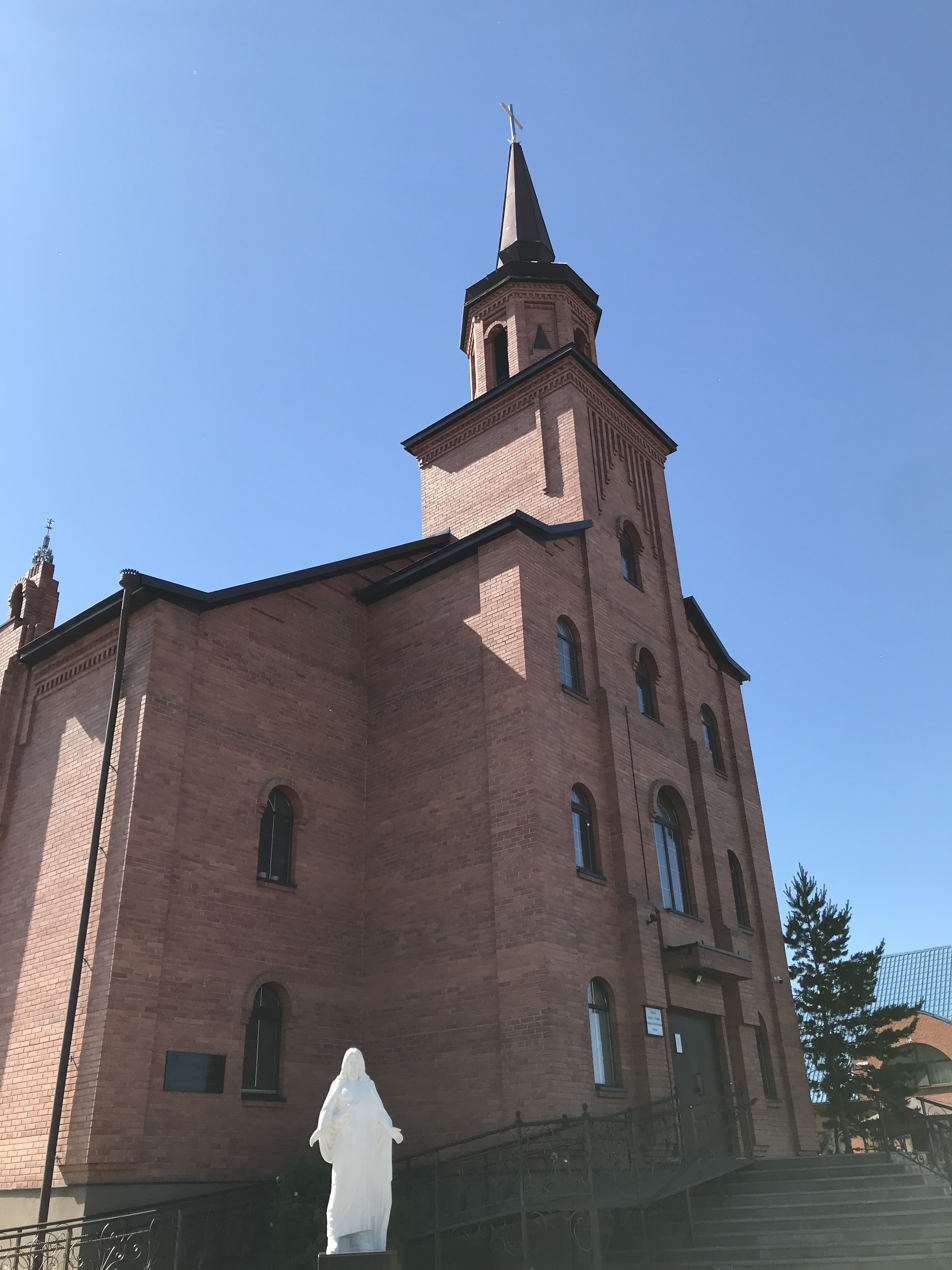
- The Catholic Church of St. Anthony of Padua
- St Anthony of Padua's Church
- 53.27869°N 69.35917°E
- Location: Kokshetau, Akmola Region
- Country: Kazakhstan
- Denomination: Roman Catholic
- Website: Official website

History
- Status: Active
- Founded: 6 October 1992
- Dedication: St. Anthony of Padua
- Consecrated: 19 September 1999

Architecture
- Functional status: Parish church
- Architect: Ivanitsky Victor
- Architectural type: Church building
- Style: elements of modernism and gothic
- Years built: 1992—1997
- Groundbreaking: 1992
- Completed: 1997

Administration
- Diocese: Roman Catholic Archdiocese of Mary Most Holy in Astana

The St. Anthony of Padua Church (Kazakh: Әулие Энтони Падуя шіркеуі, romanized: Äulie İentoni Paduia şırkeuı) is a Roman Catholic Parish church in the city of Kokshetau, the capital of Akmola Region, in the northern part of Kazakhstan. It is dedicated to the Anthony of Padua and is located at Akan-Sery Street, 7 (formerly Proletarskaya Street); 020000; near Bukpa Hill. The church is built in the neo-Gothic style.

It is the seat of the deanery of Kokshetau, which depends on the Roman Catholic Archdiocese of Mary Most Holy in Astana, centered in Nur-Sultan and led by Archbishop Metropolitan Tomasz Peta. The parish was established on 6 October 1992. It was constructed from 1992 to 1997, with the design of architect Ivanitsky Victor, consecrated on 19 September 1999.

== History ==
For most of the 1960s and 70s, the Catholic community gathered in secret to escape the oppression of the Soviet regime. After the fall of the USSR and the end of an atheistic government, the Catholic Church in Kazakhstan, like other Christians were allowed to operate relatively normally.

The St. Anthony of Padua Church in Kokshetau was founded on 6 October 1992 to serve mainly the needs of German Catholics of the Volga and Polish Catholics who live in the city. They previously met in the ordinary house of one parishioner on the Elemisova Street, 104 (formerly Frunze Street).

In 1992, the Apostolic Administrator of Kazakhstan, Bishop Jan Paul Lenga, gave his blessing to the construction of a new church. Construction began in 1992 in neo-Gothic style with elements of modern twentieth century architecture. The first mass was celebrated on 24 December 1995, in the basement of the church. This event coincided with the great celebration of the Nativity of Christ.

From 13 to 15 June 1997 the temple housed a statue of Our Lady of Fatima from Portugal.

On 19 September 1999 the temple was consecrated by the Bishop Jan Paul Lenga, Bishop Maryan Florczyk — Bishop of the Kielce Diocese, Father Tomasz Peta — Archbishop Metropolitan of the Roman Catholic Archdiocese of Mary Most Holy in Astana, among others.

=== Organ ===
In June 1999, the organ of the Polish company "Ludwik Saganowski", produced in 1948, was installed in the church. This organ is pneumatic, consists of 2 manuals and a pedal, 14 registers. It was donated by the Church of St. Stanislaus Kostka from Poznań (Poland).

== See also ==
- Roman Catholicism in Kazakhstan
- Roman Catholic Archdiocese of Mary Most Holy in Astana
