= Guisan =

Guisan may refer to:

- 1960 Guisan, a main-belt asteroid named after Henri Guisan
- Antoine Guisan, Swiss ecologist
- Esperanza Guisán (1940–2015), Spanish philosopher
- General-Guisan-Quai, a section of the Zürich quays named after Henri Guisan
- Hélène Guisan (born 1916), Swiss author
- Henri Guisan (1874–1960), Swiss general
- Jean Samuel Guisan (1740–1801), Swiss engineer
- María del Carmen Guisán, Spanish economist
- Nicolas David Guisan (1727–1781), Swiss plantation owner
