= Franco-Brazilian Binational Bridge =

Bridge between Brazil and French Guiana

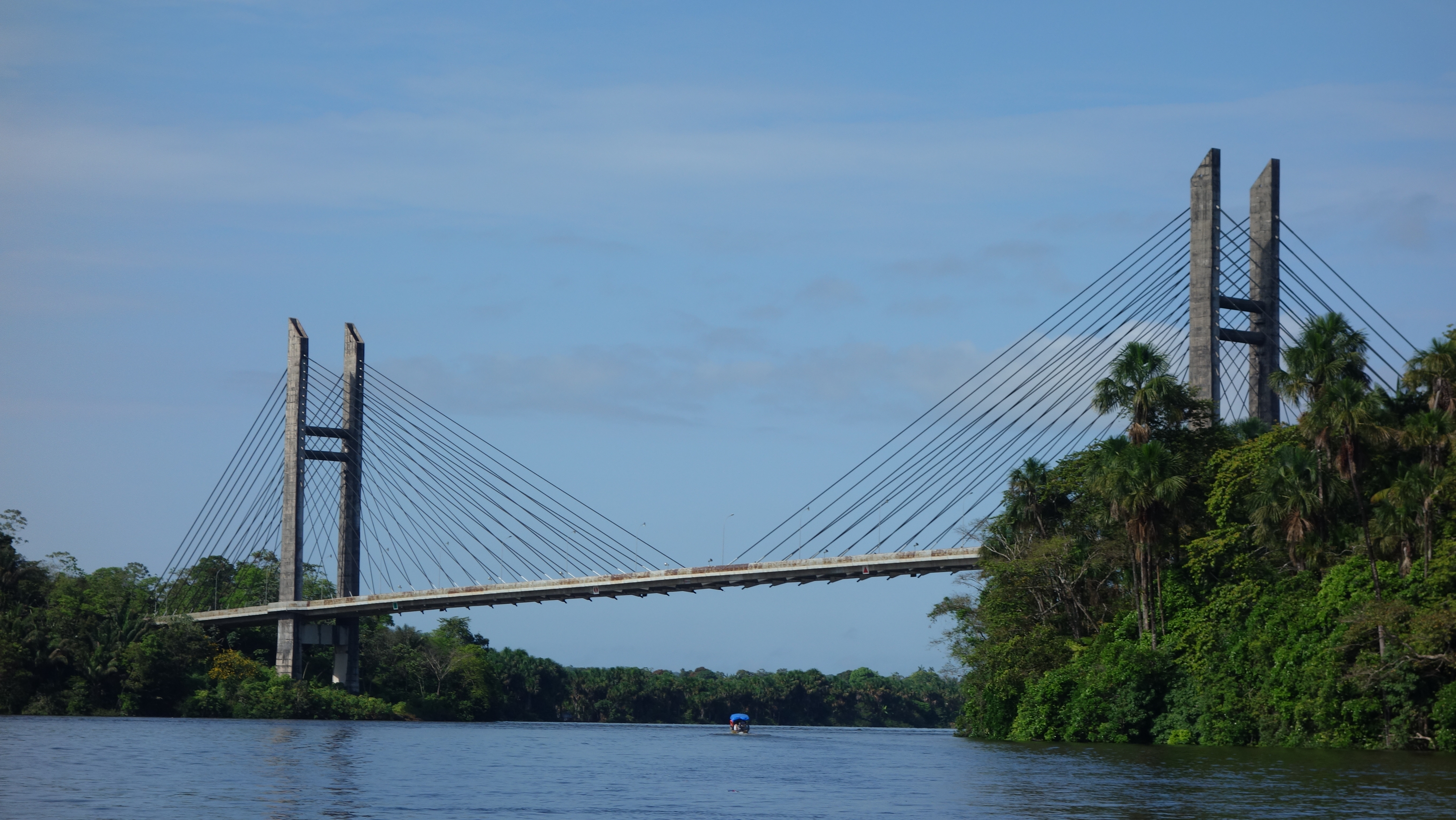
- Coordinates: 3°51′25″N 51°49′32″W
- Carries: 2-lane wide highway
- Crosses: Oyapock River
- Locale: Border between Brazil and France
- Official name: French: Pont binational franco-brésilien Portuguese: Ponte Binacional Franco-Brasileira

Characteristics
- Design: Cable-stayed
- Total length: 378 metres (1,240 ft)
- Width: 9 metres (30 ft)
- Clearance below: 15 metres (49 ft)

History
- Constructed by: EGESA and CMT (Consórcio Metropolitano de Transportes)
- Opened: 20 March 2017; 9 years ago

Location
- Interactive map of Franco-Brazilian Binational Bridge

The Franco-Brazilian Binational Bridge spans the Oyapock River, linking the cities of Oiapoque in Amapá, Brazil and Saint-Georges-de-l'Oyapock in French Guiana, France. The bridge is cable-stayed, with two towers rising to a height of 83 metres (272 ft) and a length of 378 metres (1,240 ft). There are two lanes for vehicles with a total width of 9 metres (30 ft) and a pedestrian sidewalk with a width of 2.50 metres (8 ft 2 in). The vertical clearance under the bridge is 15 metres (49 ft).

Its construction was completed in August 2011. However, due to delays in the construction of Brazilian checkpoint facilities, the bridge was not open to traffic for many years.

The bridge's designer was the Italian engineer Mario de Miranda.

The inauguration ceremony of the bridge finally took place on 18 March 2017. Starting from 08:00 on 20 March 2017, the bridge has been open to members of the public.

The bridge is toll-free and is accessible to both private cars and pedestrians. On the French side, there is a border checkpoint staffed by three governmental agencies: the Border Police, Customs and the Directorate for Food, Agriculture and Forestry. The border checkpoint is open from 08:00 to 12:00 and from 14:00 to 18:00 on weekdays, and is closed on Saturdays, Sundays and Brazilian public holidays.

Until the Brazilian border outposts are completed, only passenger vehicles (not cargo vehicles or public transportation vehicles) are permitted access. As the Brazilian side of the bridge is not staffed, travellers arriving in Brazil are required to stop at the offices of the Secretaria da Receita Federal do Brasil and the Federal Police in Oiapoque to regularise their entry.

With the bridge open to traffic, it is now possible to drive from Cayenne to Macapá, the capital of the Brazilian state of Amapá, although parts of the BR-156 federal highway on the Brazilian side are yet to be paved (of the 600 km (370 mi) between Oiapoque and Macapá, around 105 km (65 mi) has not yet been paved).

== History ==
Though the bridge was officially announced in 1997, it was only after nearly 10 years of stalling and talks that a model of the bridge between France and Brazil was finally unveiled by French president Nicolas Sarkozy and Brazilian president Luiz Inácio Lula da Silva on February 14, 2008.

The site chosen for the positioning of the bridge required a length of 378 metres (1,240 ft), which includes a span of approximately 200 metres (660 ft) over water, and valued at R$62,100,000 (approximately US$50,000,000).

Construction of the bridge was undertaken by a partnership between EGESA and the Consórcio Metropolitano de Transportes - CMT, both of which are headquartered in Brasília. The Professor Carlos Augusto Bittencourt Foundation - FUNCAB (based in the city of Niterói, Rio de Janeiro) was hired to oversee the environmental engineering of the project, so that the construction of the bridge does not harm the natural environment. The bridge is part of the Guianese Shield Hub of the Initiative for the Integration of the Regional Infrastructure of South America. The construction of this bridge came after the signing of an international treaty between France and Brazil in July 2005. Furthermore, the connection between Route N2 and BR-156 is yet another initiative undertaken under the scope of the Brazilian government's PAC (Growth Acceleration Plan) infrastructure project.

The Route BR-156 was conceived as development factor and a national security initiative. In the words of Walter do Carmo pioneer, entrepreneur and engineer actively involved on the project, "the federal highway BR-156 was planned to establish the terrestrial junction between the Amazon River Basin, south of Macapá and Oyapock River Basin in northern Brazil's border with French Guiana."

This bridge is the first land crossing (ferries have been used historically) along the border between France and Brazil, and indeed it is the first terrestrial crossing between French Guiana and any of its neighbors in northern South America. Currently, there is a good ferry that crosses the Maroni River between French Guiana and Suriname that links Albina, in Suriname, with Saint-Laurent-du-Maroni in French Guiana. It is also possible to travel from Albina to Georgetown (Guyana) by highway; it is planned to build a bridge between Suriname and Guyana, replacing the current ferry. Onwards to Venezuela, one can only travel by sea, but a road link is planned. In this case, it will be possible to drive from Macapá to Venezuela and Colombia with only one ferry crossing.

Though the Oyapock Bridge was to be inaugurated in early 2012, it remained closed as the road on the Brazilian side was not completely paved. As of April 2013, the opening was scheduled for the end of 2013, but as of January 2015 the bridge had still not opened due to delays in the construction of the Brazilian customs facility, and no opening date was forecast. Another reason for the delayed opening of the bridge, as identified by Brazilian Senator João Capiberibe, was the lack of reciprocity pertaining to the visa requirements for Brazilian and French nationals entering each other's territory (French nationals could enter Brazil visa-free for up to 3 months, whereas Brazilian nationals had to obtain a visa to enter French Guiana, a requirement which was justified by the French government on the grounds of high levels of illegal immigration by Brazilians working as gold panners in French Guiana). In 2014, the Brazilian and French governments reached an agreement allowing residents of Oiapoque in Brazil and Saint-Georges-de-l'Oyapock in French Guiana to apply for a local border crossing card ('carte de frontalier'), enabling them to visit each other's city visa-free for up to 72 hours (but not further inland). The local border crossing card has a maximum validity of 2 years and contains a biometric chip; it can be used to cross the border without having to present a Brazilian passport. The arrangement came into effect on 1 January 2015 and, as of 1 October 2015, over 200 cards had been issued to Brazilian citizens resident in Oiapoque. According to the French government, the Brazilian government was 'largely satisfied' with this arrangement (though it fell short of full visa waiver reciprocity).

Even though the Brazilian checkpoint had not yet been completed and full visa waiver reciprocity had not yet been achieved, due to pressure from the French government, the bridge was inaugurated on 18 March 2017 in the presence of officials from Brazil and French Guiana (including the Governor of Amapá, Waldez Góes, the Prefect of French Guiana, Martin Jaeger, and the Mayor of Saint-Georges-de-l'Oyapock, Georges Elfort). The French Minister of Ecology, Sustainable Development and Energy, Ségolène Royal, was originally due to attend the inauguration ceremony, but in the end was not present. The official reason for her absence at the inauguration ceremony was that her Brazilian counterpart would not be present, but local media suggested that the actual reason was the various protests she faced during her visit in French Guiana, which led her to cut short her visit in the overseas department and fly back to Paris on 17 March 2017.

== Gallery ==
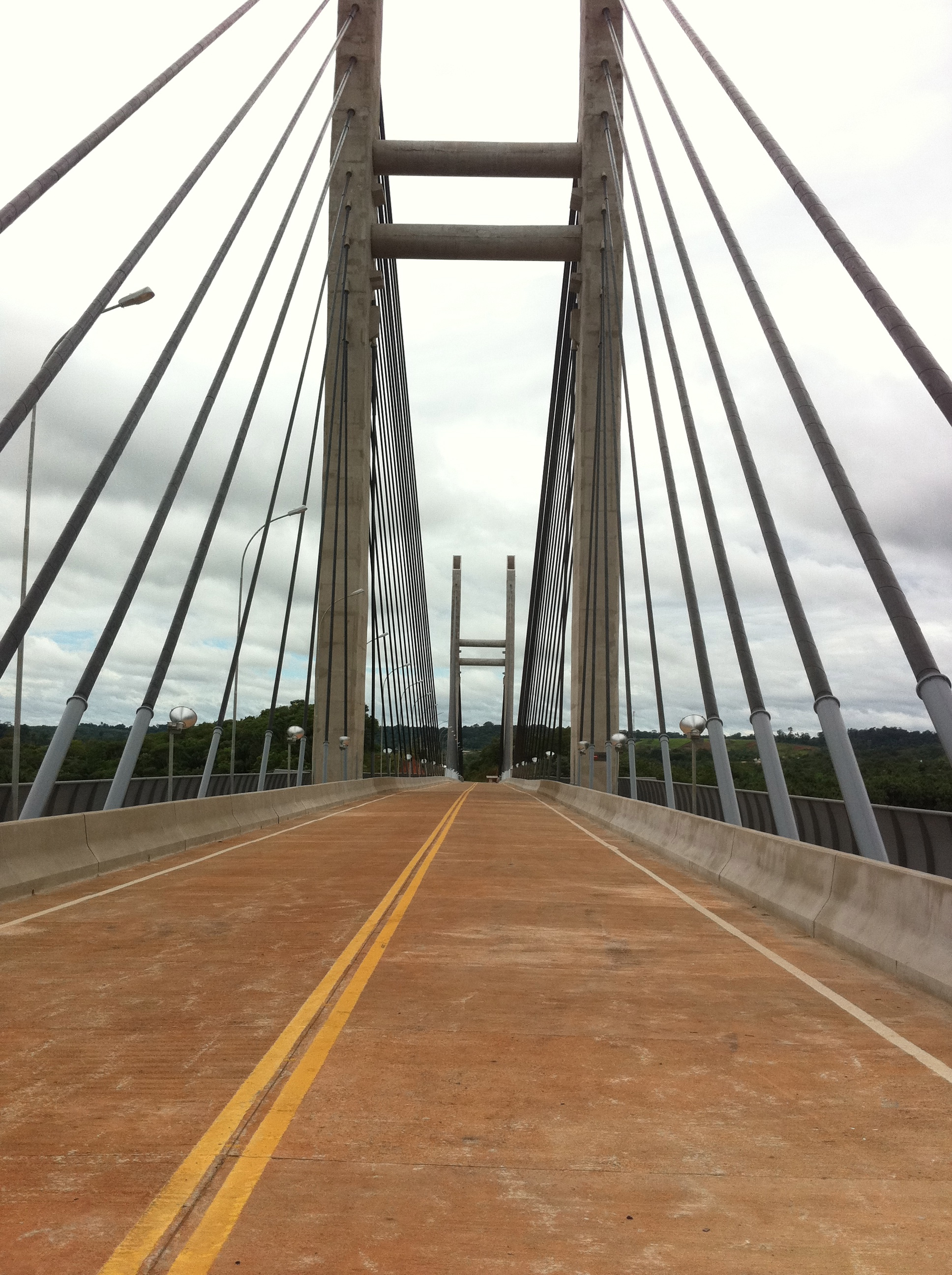
View from the French side

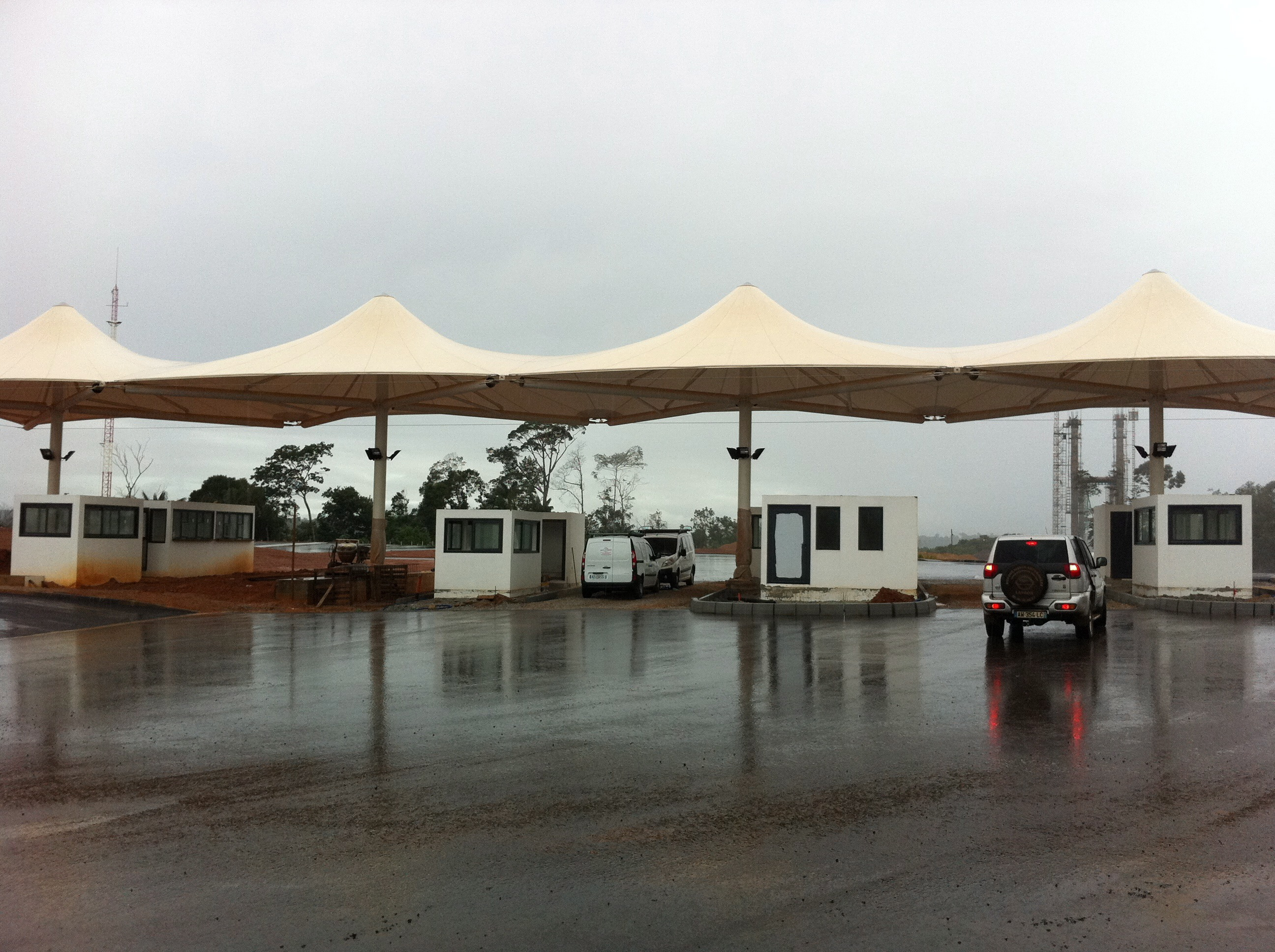
Control posts

== See also ==
- List of bridges in France
- Approuague Bridge — another bridge on the N2 road, spanning the Approuague River near Régina
- Takutu River Bridge — a similar bridge between Brazil and Guyana.
- List of international bridges
