= Trésor Regional Nature Reserve =

Nature reserve in French Guiana

- IUCN category IV (habitat/species management area)
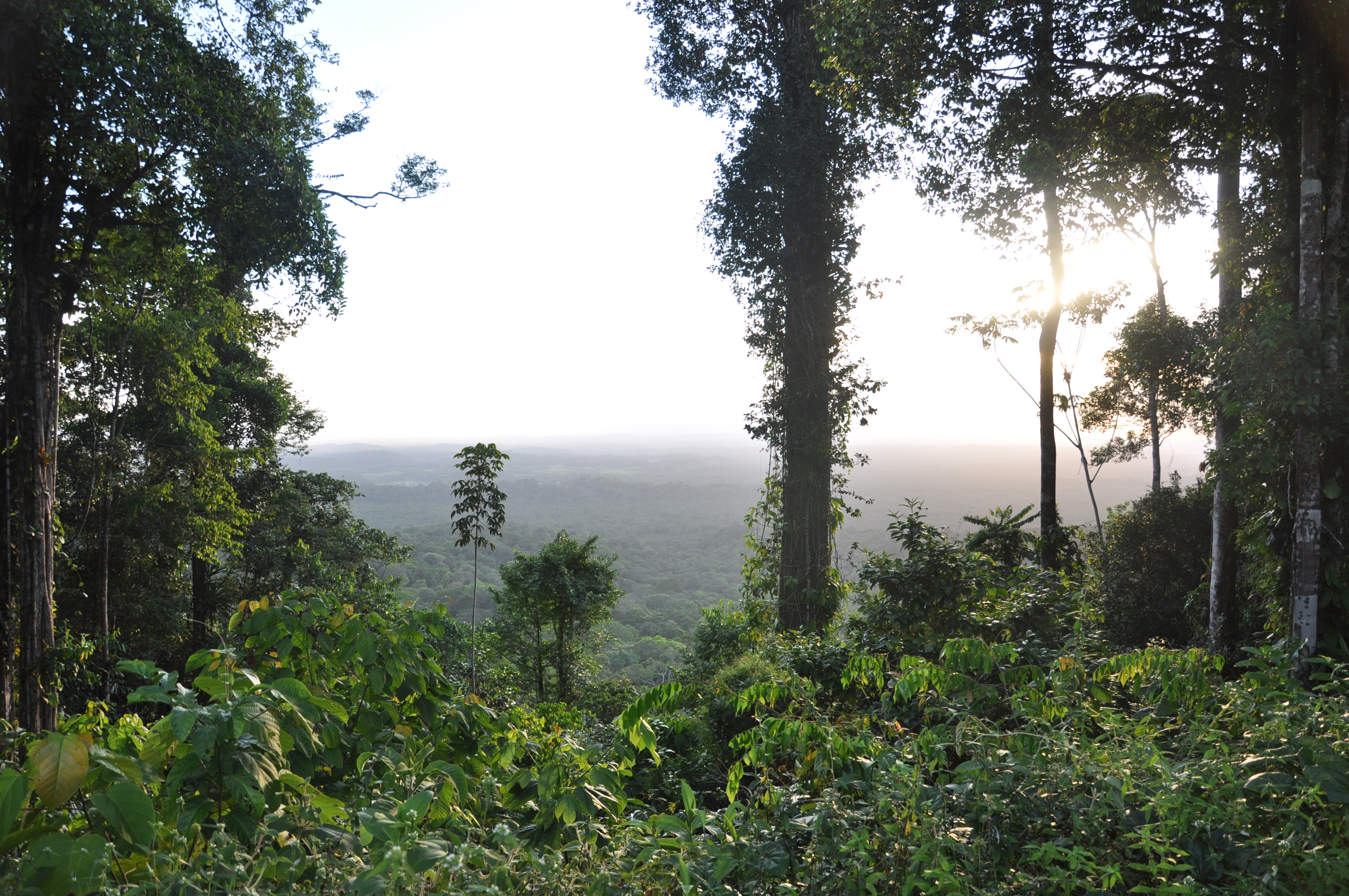
- View from the Kaw Mountain

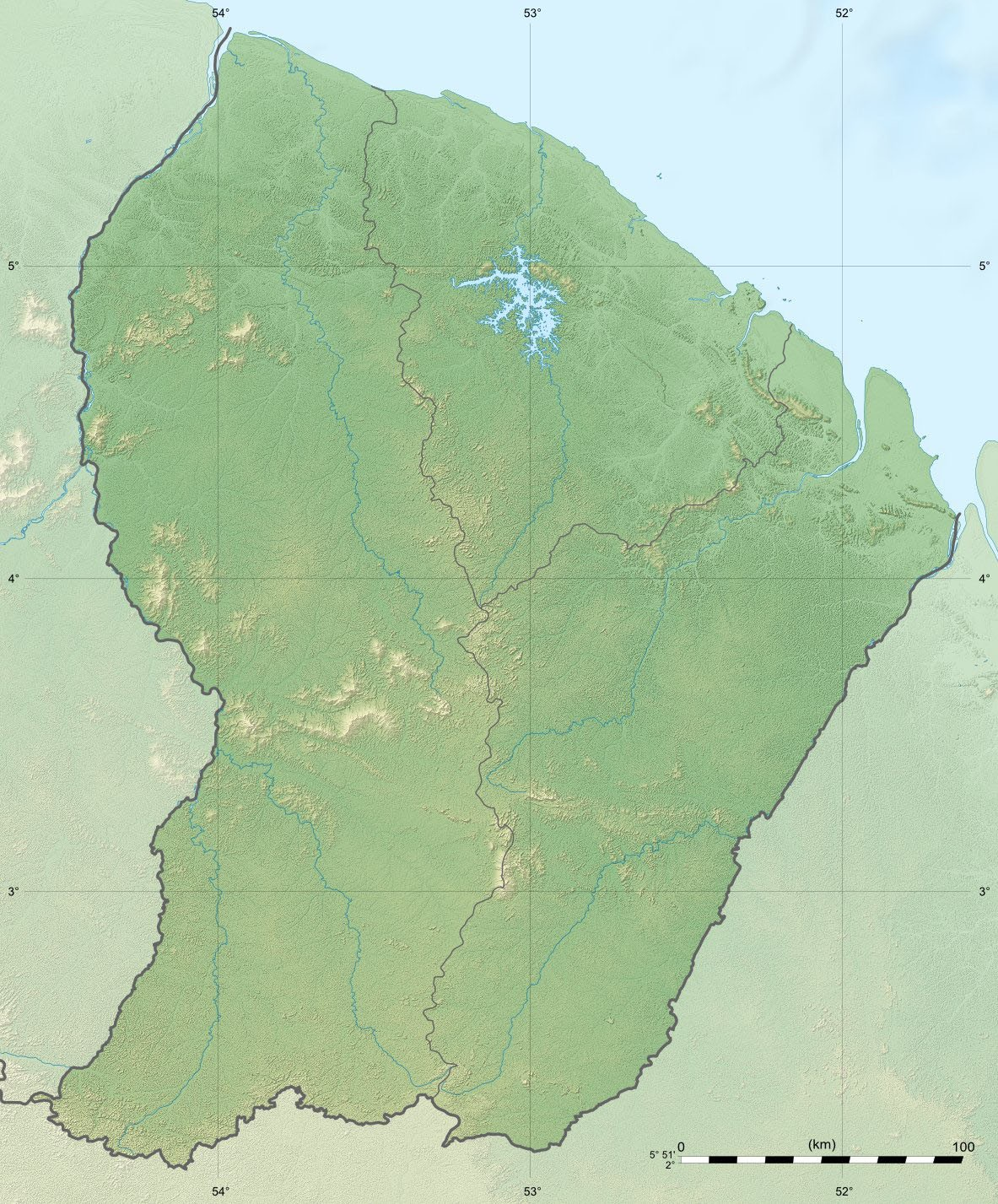
- Location within French Guiana
- Location: French Guiana, France
- Nearest city: Roura
- Coordinates: 04°36′37″N 52°16′45″W
- Area: 24.64 km^{2} (9.51 sq mi)
- Established: 12 February 2010
- Governing body: Association of French Natural Reserves
- Website: Reserve-Tresor.fr (in French)

The Trésor Regional Nature Reserve (French: Réserve naturelle régionale Trésor) is a regional nature reserve in French Guiana, France. The reserve is adjacent to the national Kaw-Roura Marshland Nature Reserve on the flank of the Kaw Mountain. The reserve is located about 20 kilometres from Roura.

== Overview ==
The Trésor Regional Nature Reserve contains a variety of ecosystems ranging from mountain forest, marsh forest to savannah. The 337 metres (1,106 ft) high mountain. is an obstacle to the trade winds leading to a very high humidity resulting in an abundance of plant- and animal life.

Over 1,100 plant species have identified as well as 101 mammals and 70 reptiles. A great number of butterflies can be seen in the reserve. Small forest areas at the base are home to rare and endemic plants like Vochysia neyratii and Astrocaryum rodreguiseii.

In 2006, Cambior was active in the region with a controversial gold mining project. The clearing of 30 km^{2} of old-growth forest near camp Caïman triggered protests from environmental agencies and the Palikur Amerindians. On 30 January 2008, the President of France cancelled the project. On 12 February 2010, the General Council of French Guiana voted to protect the mountain and surrounding area as a regional nature reserve.
