= Guisanbourg =

- Abandoned town
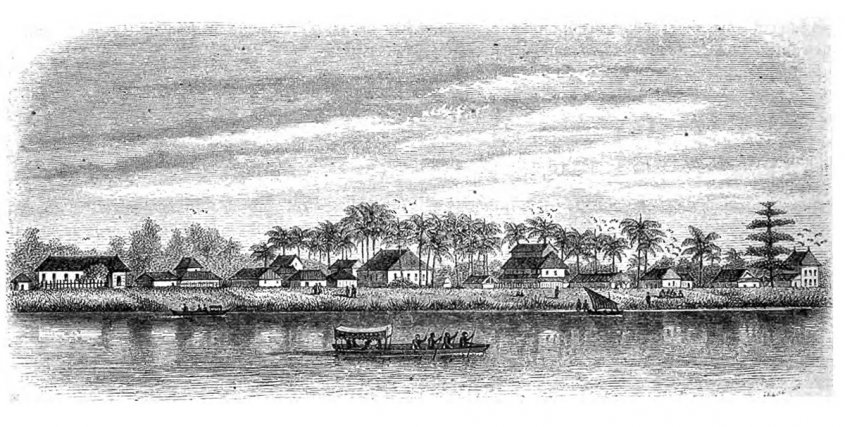
- Guisanbourg in 1856 from the Approuague River

- Location in French Guiana
- Coordinates: 4.39074°N 51.93306°W
- Country: France
- Overseas region: French Guiana
- Arrondissement: Cayenne
- Commune: Régina

Population (1980s)
  - Total: 0

Guisanbourg (also Guizanbourg) is an uninhabited town in the commune of Régina, north-east French Guiana, situated on the Approuague river.

== History ==
In the 1820s, sugarcane plantations were established along the Approugue. In April 1832, the town of Approuague was founded at the site as the administrative centre of the commune, because warships could harbour there. In April 1834, the town was renamed Guisanbourg after Jean Samuel Guisan who poldered the region. On 10 August 1848, slavery was abolished, and many of the former slaves left the region for Cayenne. 1,200 contract workers were hired as replacement mainly from India.

In July 1855, the Amerindian Paoline entered the town with gold. Soon after, the town started to empty to villages further upstream. A new town called Régina started to develop nearby. In January 1936, Guisanbourg lost its status as administrative centre of the commune to Régina. In 1977, there were only 15 citizens left. The town of Guisanbourg became a ghost town in the mid-1980s.

The National Road 2 (RN2) from nearby Régina to St-Georges de l’Oyapock was completed in 2004. In 2008, the Zanmourette Association started to clean up the town which had become lost in the rain forest.
