= Îles du Connétable =

Two islands in French Guiana

- IUCN category IV (habitat/species management area)
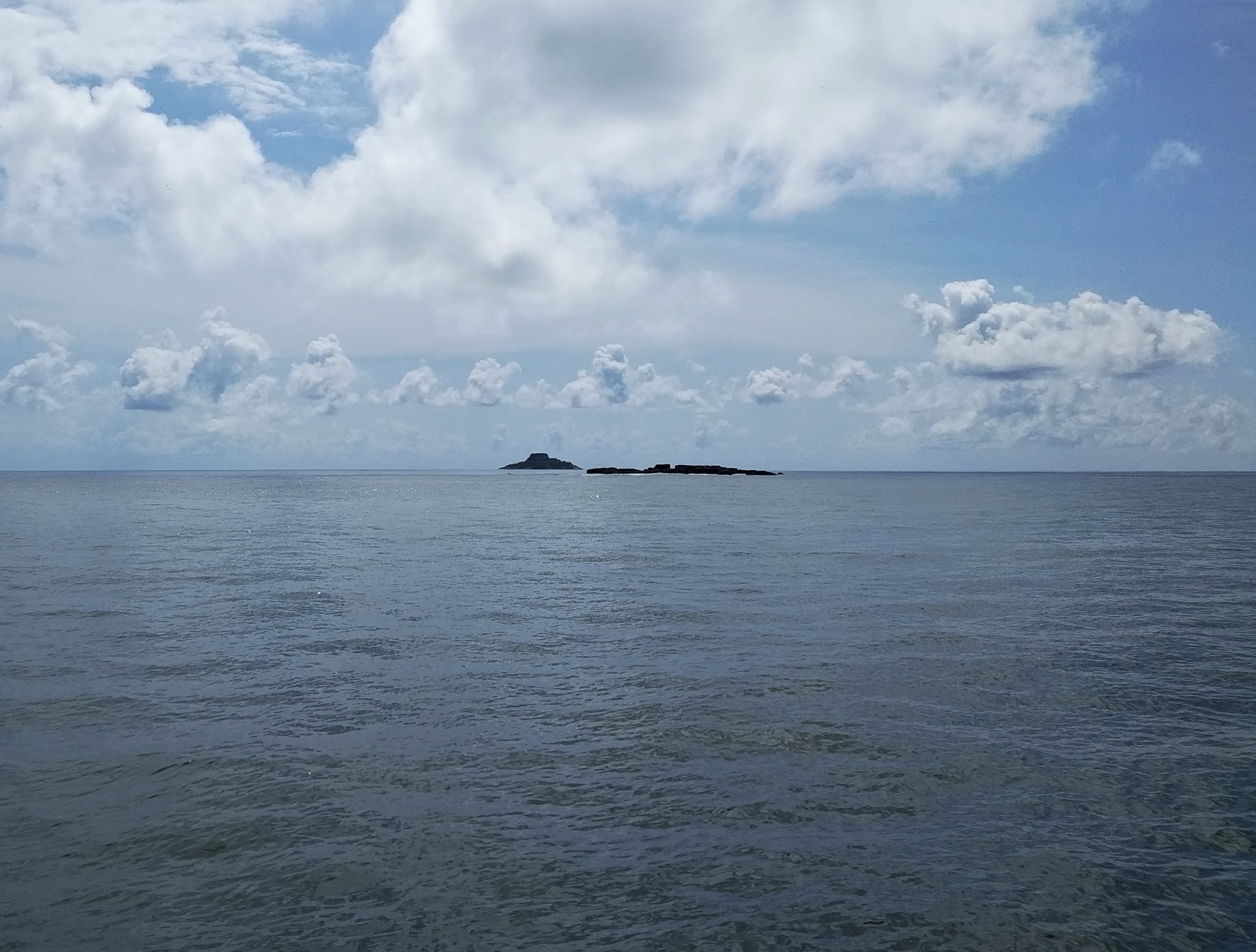
- Grand and Petit Connétable

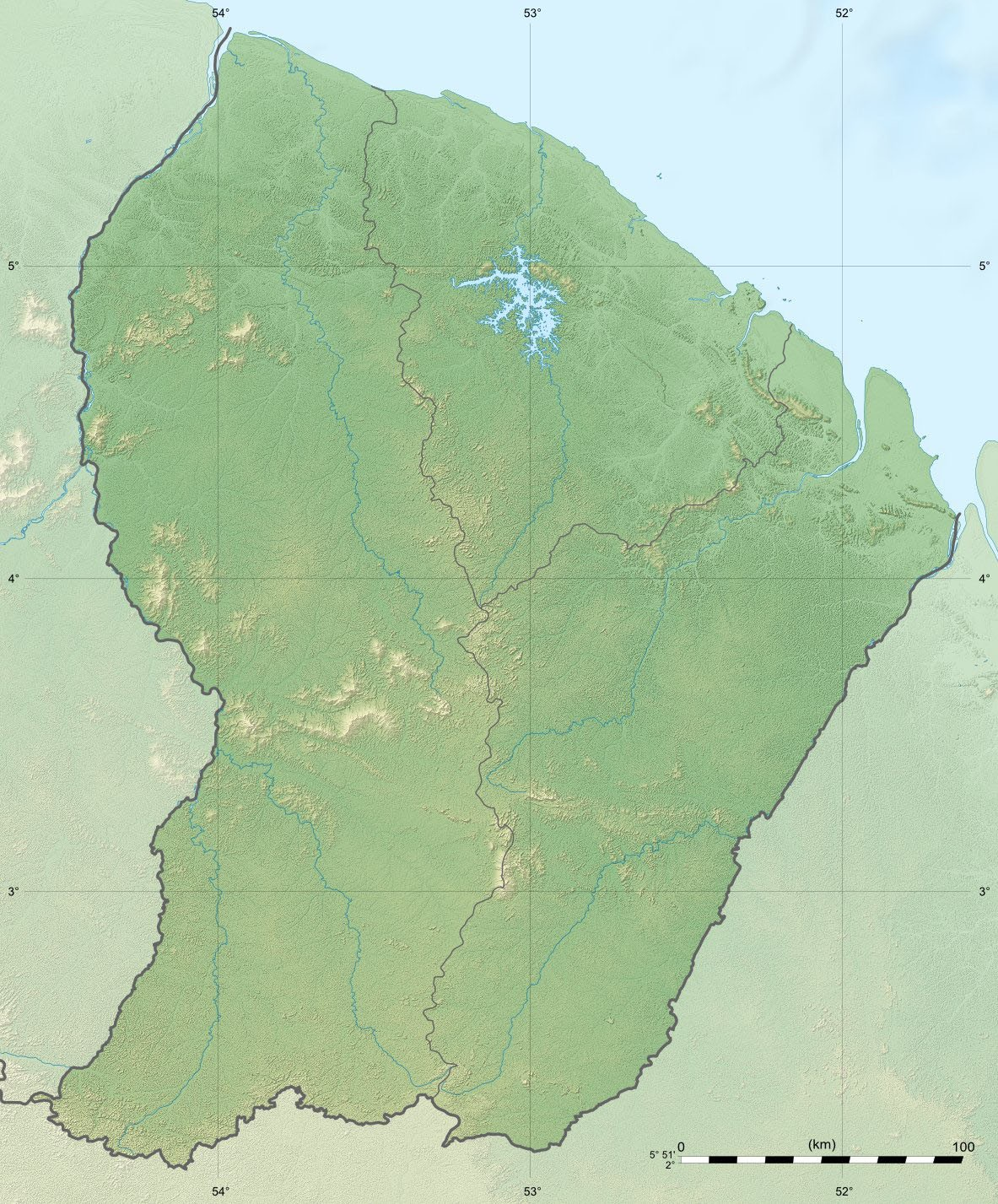
- Location within French Guiana
- Location: French Guiana, France
- Nearest city: Cayenne
- Coordinates: 4.8220°N 51.9389°W
- Area: 78.5 km^{2} (30.3 sq mi) (mainly sea)
- Established: 8 December 1992
- Governing body: Conservatoire du littoral
- Website: Reserves-Naturelles.org (in French)

The Îles du Connétable (Constable Islands) are two islands (Grand Connétable and Petit Connétable) in French Guiana, France. The islands are located 18 kilometres from the estuary of the Approuague River, and are part of the commune of Régina. As of 1992, the islands and surrounding ocean are part of the Île du Grand Connétable Nature Reserve.

== Overview ==
The islands are cliffs emerging from the seas which are completely treeless. It is nesting site for many birds like the Magnificent frigatebird (Fregata magnificens), the Cayenne tern (Thalasseus eurygnatha), the Royal tern (Thalasseus maximus), and the Laughing gull (Leucophaeus atricilla). In 1856, the islands were claimed under the Guano Islands Act for the United States of America. In the late 19th century, phosphates were mined from Grand Connétable by France.

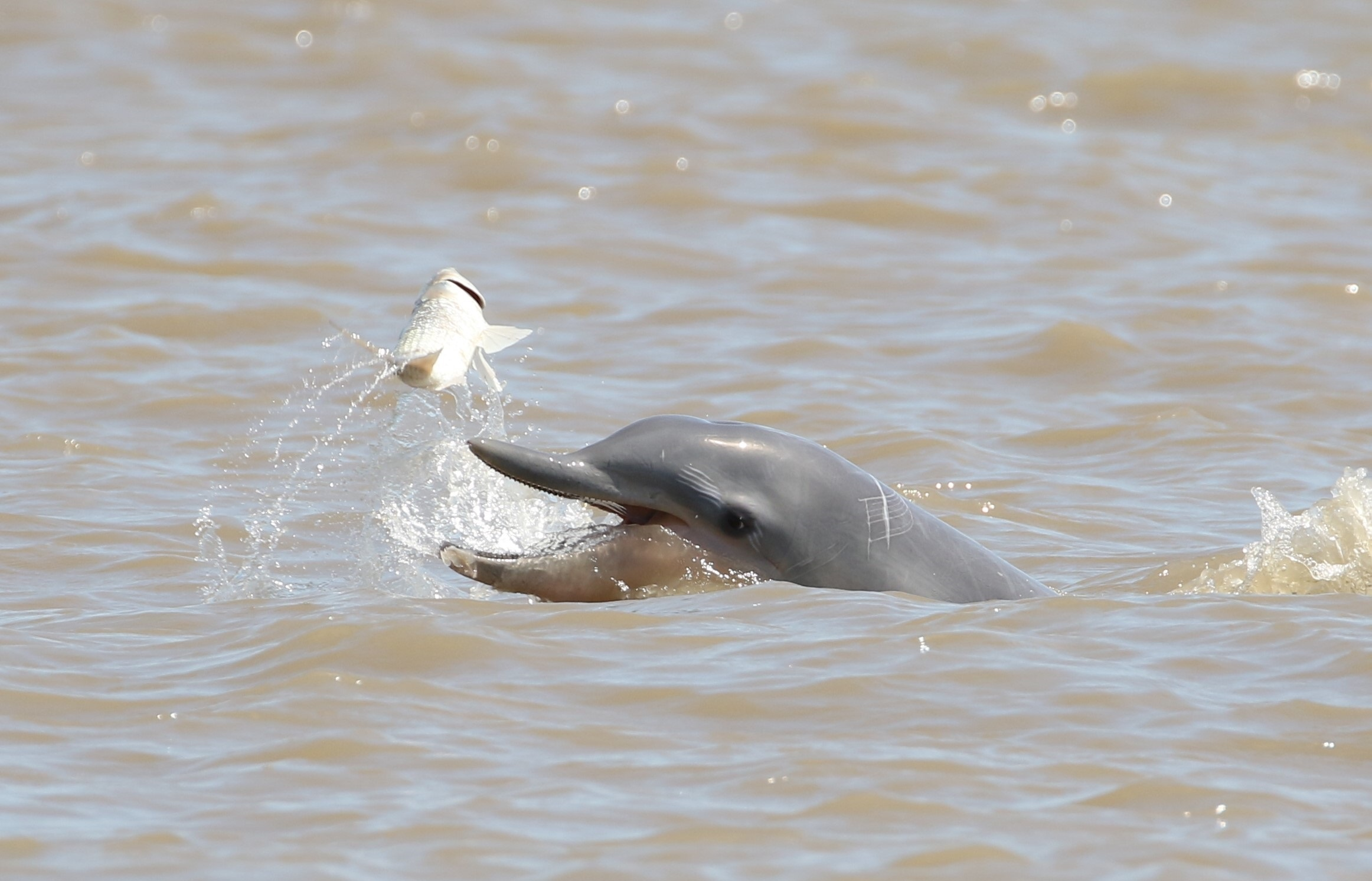
Dolphin near Grande Connétable

The importance of the islands for the bird life, the tortoises, and the marine life was recognized. On 8 December 1992, the islands and large ocean perimeter, was designated as the first nature reserve of French Guiana. The perimeter around the islands measures 5 kilometres.
