= Kaw Mountain =

Mountain in French Guiana

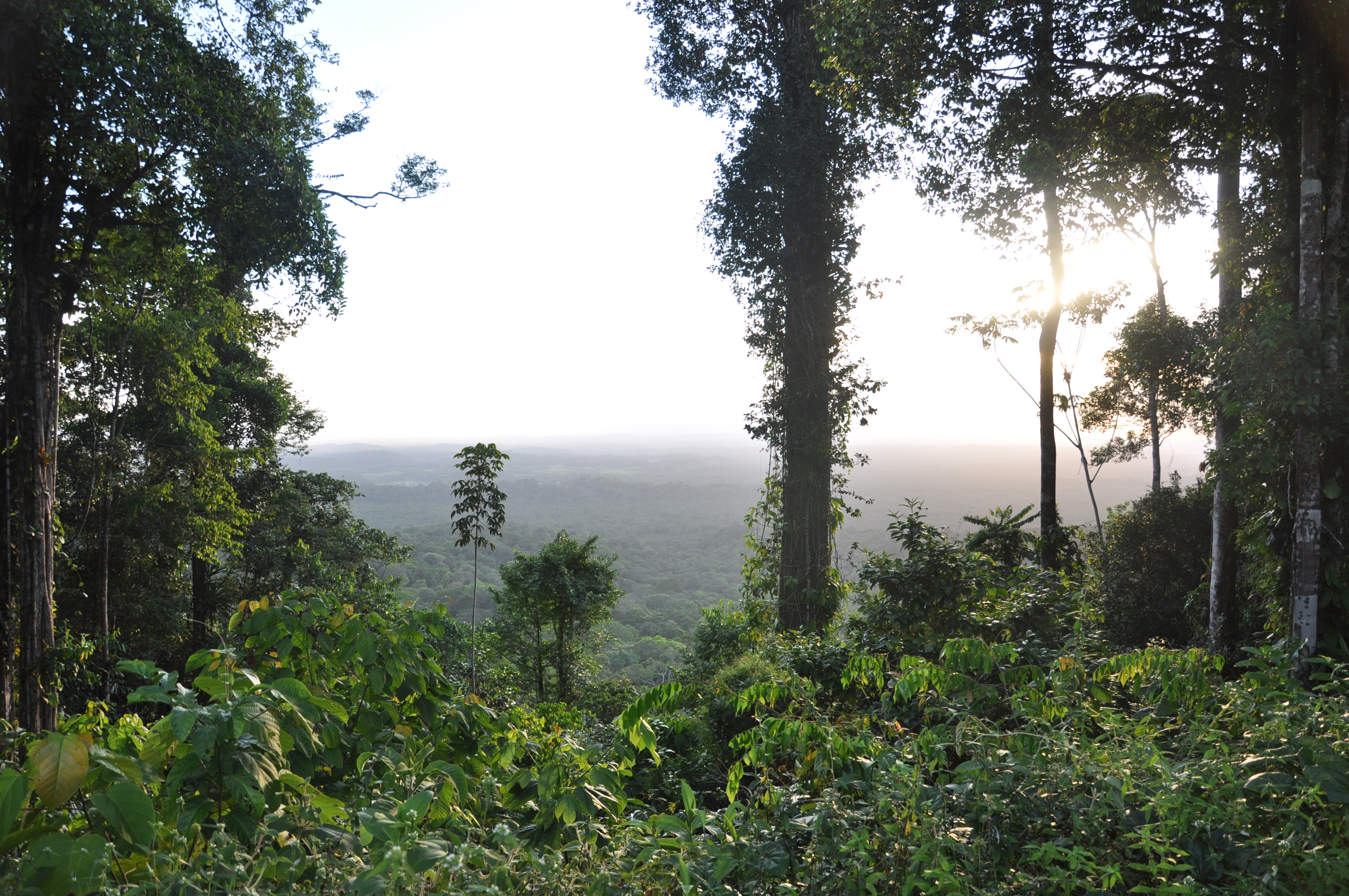
- View from the mountain

Highest point
- Elevation: 337 m (1,106 ft)
- Coordinates: 4.5992°N 52.2872°W

Geography
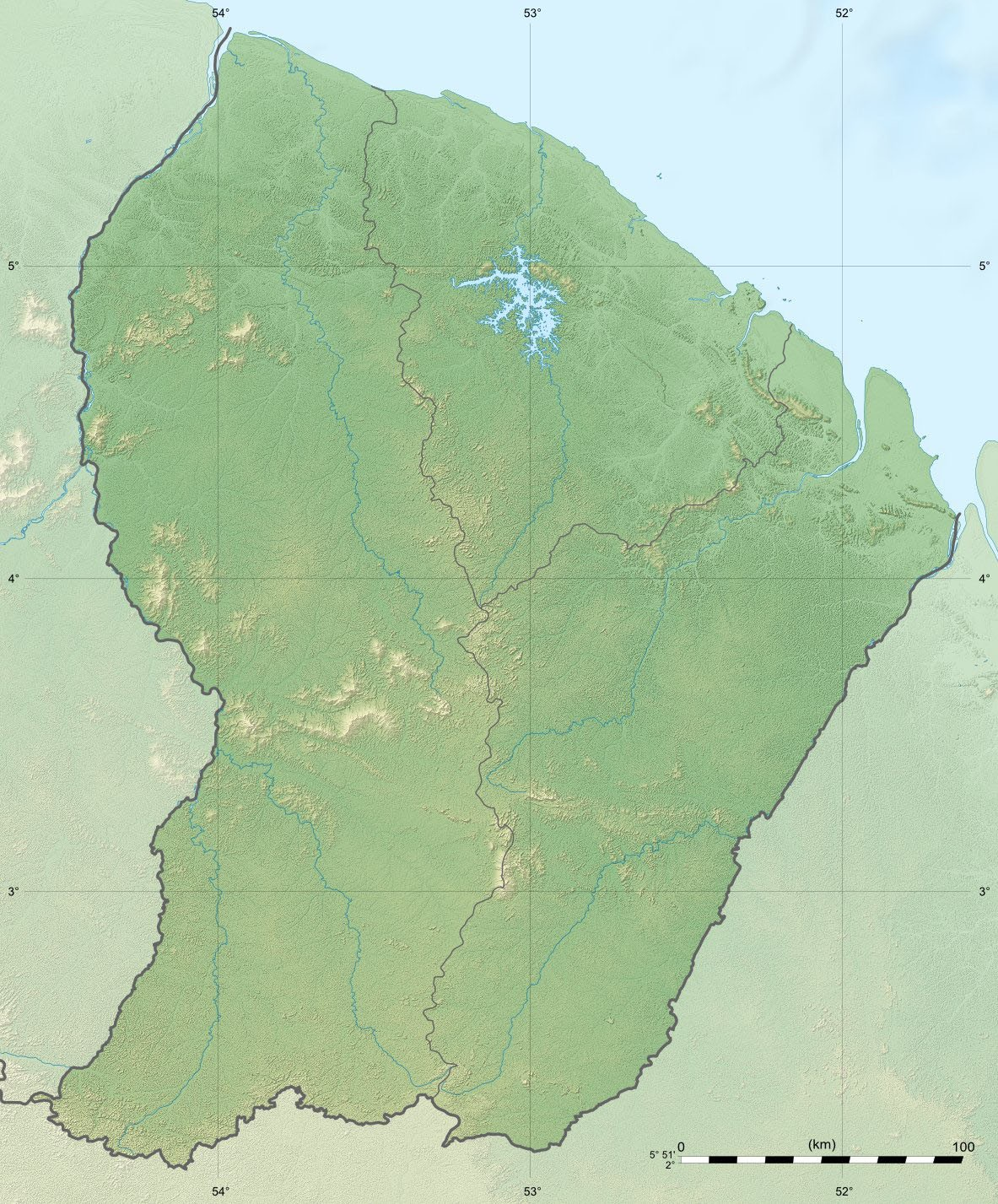
- Location within French Guiana
- Location: Roura, French Guiana

The Kaw Mountain is a 337-metre (1,106 ft) high mountain in the commune of Roura in French Guiana, France. It is a narrow tepui with a laterite top.

== Overview ==
Kaw Mountain is covered in rainforest and is part of the northern range of the Guiana Shield. The mountain is an obstacle to the trade winds leading to a very high humidity resulting in an abundance of plant- and animal life. The northern streams of the mountain flow into the Angélique Creek, the southern streams feed the Kaw and Mahury River.

The mountain is located near the Kaw-Roura Marshland Nature Reserve. On 12 February 2010, the General Council of French Guiana voted to protect the mountain and surrounding area as the Trésor Regional Nature Reserve.
