= Kaw, French Guiana =

Kaw
- Village
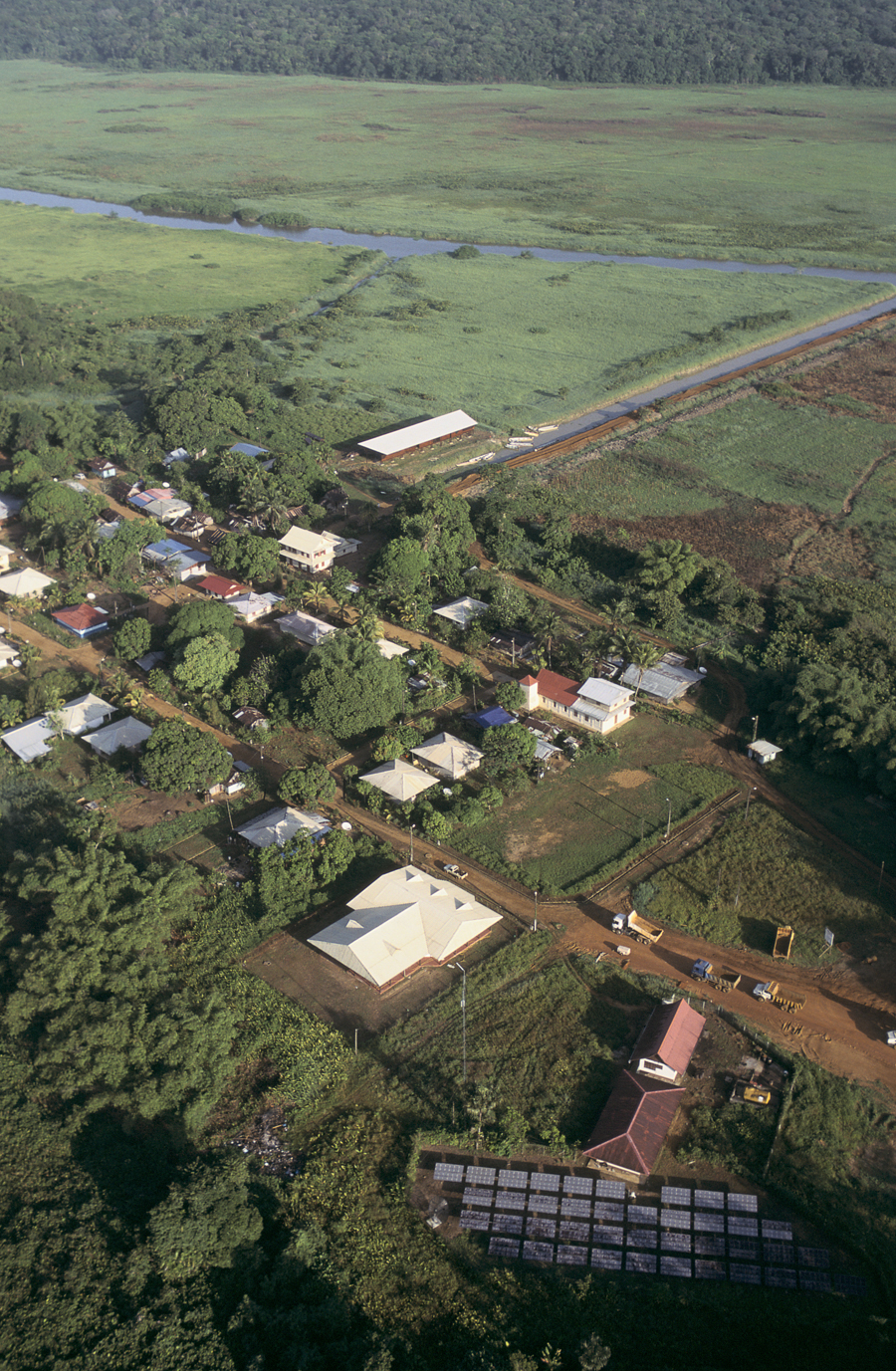
- View over the village of Kaw

- Location in French Guiana
- Coordinates: 4°29′12″N 52°2′13″W
- Country: France
- Overseas region: French Guiana
- Arrondissement: Cayenne
- Commune: Régina

Kaw or Caux (meaning marsh in French) is a village in the commune of Régina, in north-east French Guiana, situated on the banks of Approuague river. This is also a very swampy area.

== Overview ==
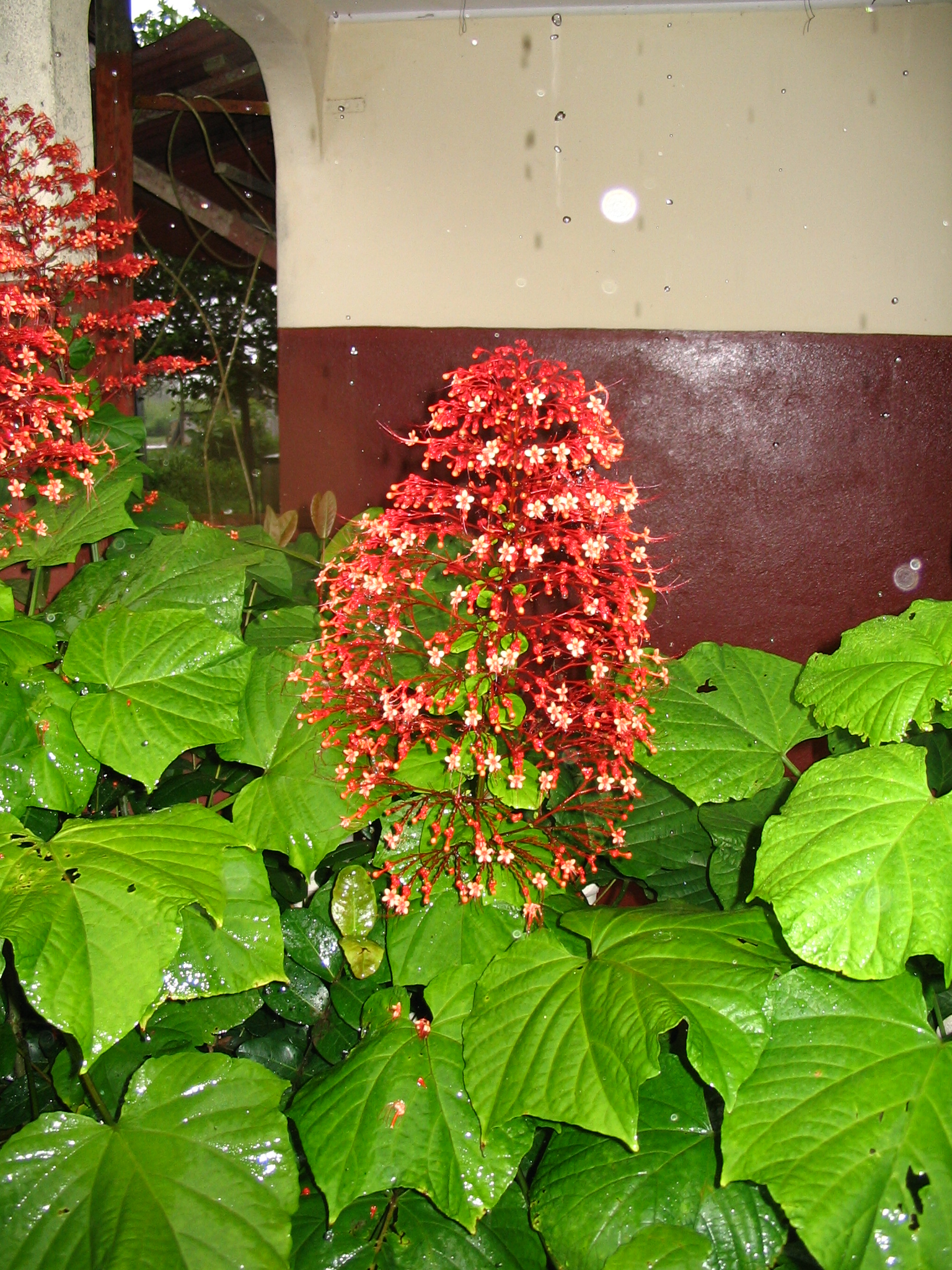
Flora of Kaw

The name Cô, Caubonne and Caux has appeared on old maps since the early 16th century. In 1783, Jean Samuel Guisan started to polder the Approuage river right up to the then indigenous village. The establishment of the road to Roura, and ecotourism strengthened the economy of the village which was largely dependent on hunting and fishing.

In 1998, the Kaw-Roura Marshland Nature Reserve was established, and covers an area of 94,700 hectares between Roura and Régina, and is sometimes nicknamed "the Everglades of Guiana".

The village has a church, a post office, a school, and a rural clinic.
