= List of museums in French Guiana =

This is a list of museums in French Guiana. The French department of French Guiana contains a limited range of museums, defined here as institutions (including nonprofit organisations, government entities, and private businesses) that collect and care for objects of cultural, artistic, scientific, or historical interest and make their collections or related exhibits available for public viewing. Non-profit art galleries and university art galleries are also included, but museums that exist only in cyberspace (i.e., virtual museums) are not. There are three main state museums.

== List of museums ==
Closed museums are marked in red.

Institution	Type of collection	Location	Opened	Picture	Ref.
Musée départemental Alexandre-Franconie	Natural history, archaeology, ethnography and local history	Cayenne, French Guiana	1901		
Musée des Cultures Guyanaises	Amerindian, Bushinengé, and Creole ethnological objects; exhibitions on Guianese cultural diversity		Late 1980s		
Musée des Cultures Guyanaises	Life on the Approuague River in twentieth century; pre-Columbian objects		2008		
Centre d'Archéologie Amérindienne de Kourou	Life on the Approuague River in twentieth century; pre-Columbian objects		2008		

== See also ==
- List of museums by country
