= Approuague Bridge =

Bridge in French Guiana

- Coordinates: 4.289662°N 52.135792°W
- Carries: RN2
- Crosses: Approuague River
- Locale: French Guiana

Characteristics
- Design: Double-girder composite frame viaduct
- Total length: 352 metres (1,155 ft)
- Width: 10.1 metres (33 ft)

History
- Opened: 17 September 2004; 21 years ago

Location
- Interactive map of Approuague Bridge

The Approuague Bridge is a bridge near Régina in French Guiana spanning the Approuague River. The bridge carries the RN2 road and was opened in 2003. A road to Saint-Georges de l'Oyapock was subsequently opened in 2004, ending the latter's isolation. With the opening of the Oyapock River Bridge in 2017, it became possible to drive from Saint-Laurent-du-Maroni in French Guiana to Macapá in Brazil.
