= Petites Montagnes Tortue Biological Reserve =

Wilderness area in French Guiana

- IUCN category Ib (wilderness area)
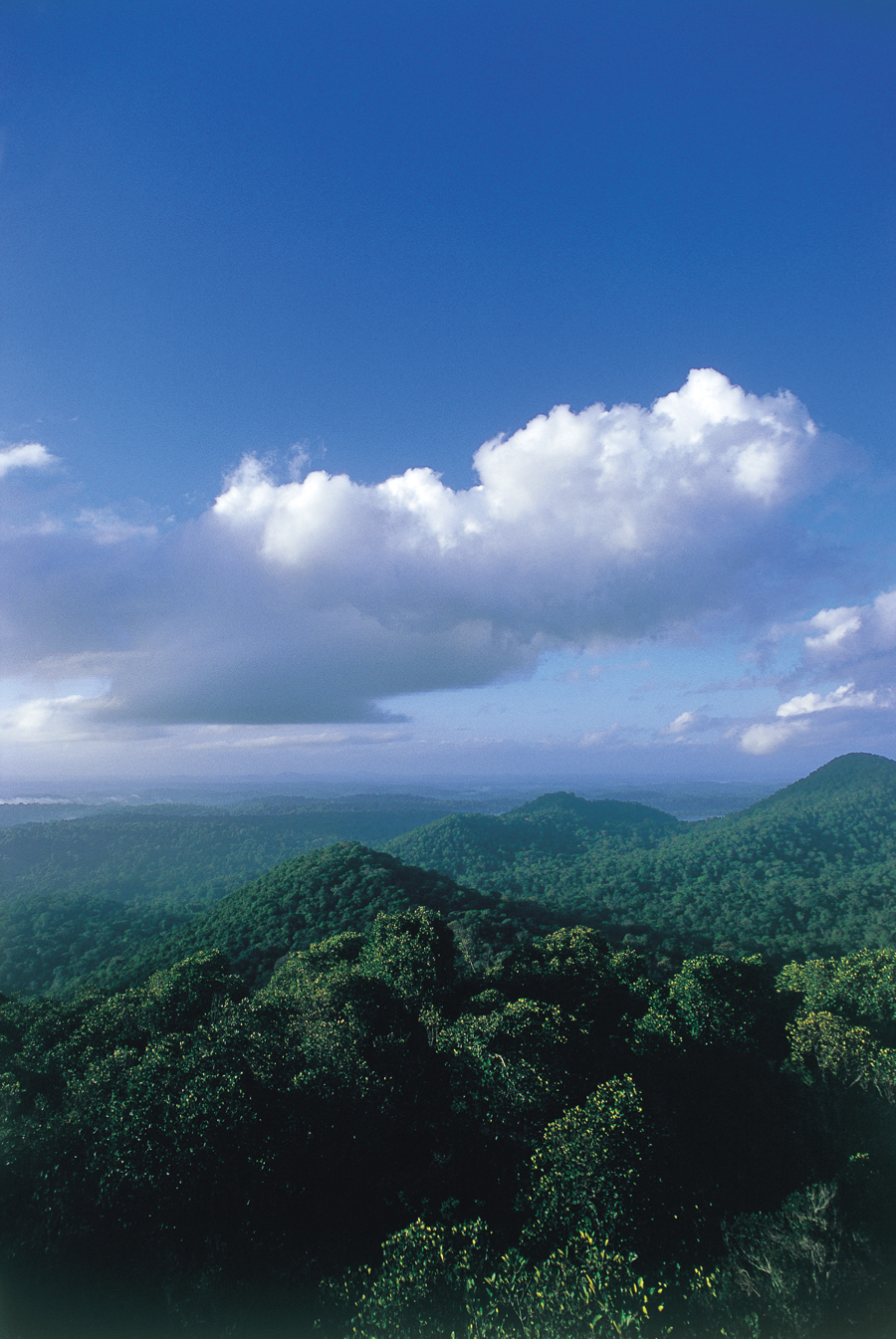
- Petites Montagne Tortue

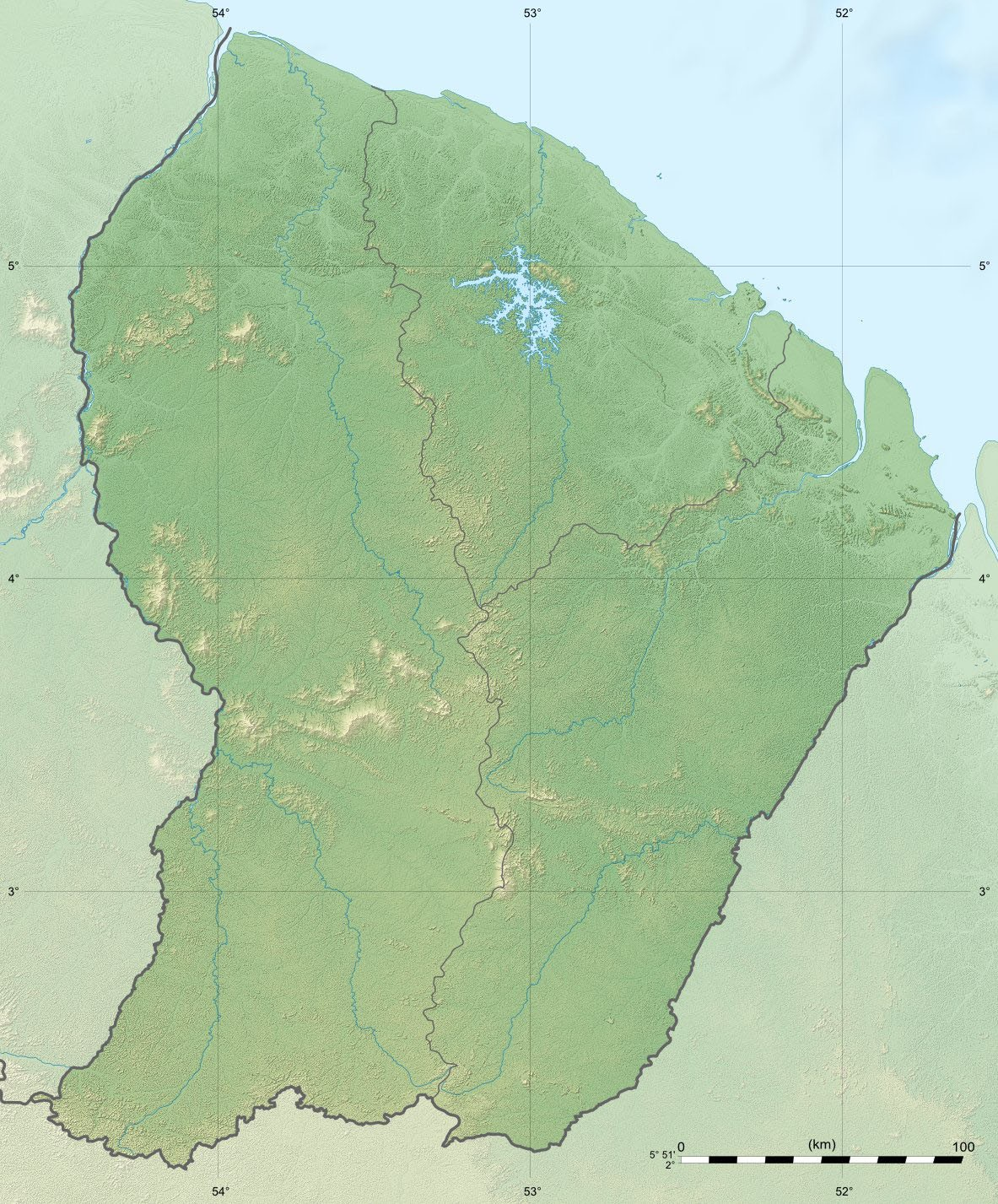
- Location within French Guiana
- Location: French Guiana, France
- Nearest city: Régina
- Coordinates: 4.3099°N 52.2154°W
- Area: 23.64 km^{2} (9.13 sq mi)
- Established: 30 September 2016
- Governing body: National Forests Office

The Petites Montagnes Tortue Biological Reserve (French: Réserve biologique intégrale des Petites Montagnes Tortue) is a wilderness area in French Guiana, France. Petites Montagnes Tortue is located about six kilometres from Régina. It is a mountain range rich in quartz and quartzites with a summit of 287 metres (942 ft). The mountains are home to a diverse flora and fauna with about 20 species which are rare or endemic.

== Overview ==
The Petites Montagnes Tortue is a small mountain range rich in quartz and quartzites. The irregular hills are covered with forests with hibiscus, eperua and amaranth species. The forests are a refuge for flora and fauna dating from the Pleistocene, and are characterised by a large biodiversity and endemism. The geomorphology with steep slopes result in rare habitats which are home to localised species.

About 20 species have been identified which are rare or endemic, and include astrocaryum minus, eschweilera squamata, heliconia dasyantha, and octomeria sarthouae. The dyeing poison dart frog is present in the mountains in great abundance.

On 30 September 2016, Petites Montagnes Tortue Biological Reserve was protected as a wilderness area. A foot path will be constructed to make the area accessible to the public.
