= Roura =

Commune in French Guiana, France

- Commune
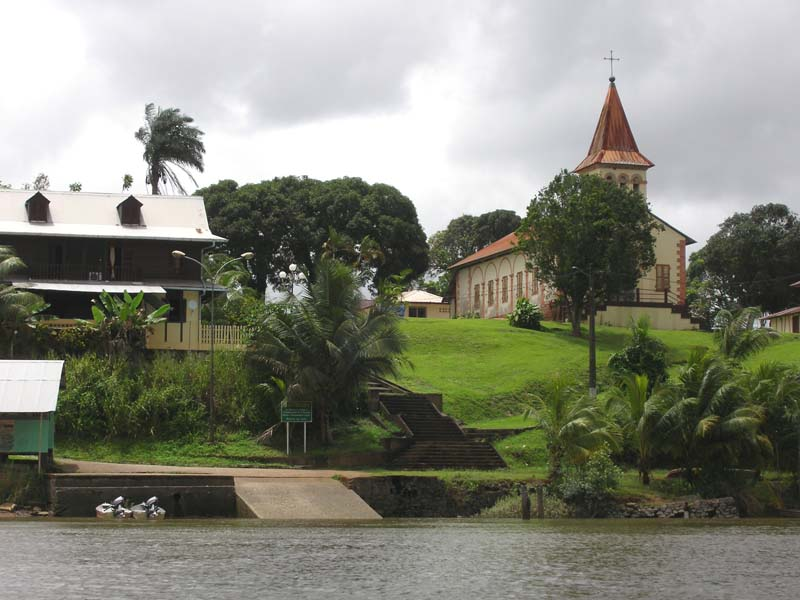
- Roura as seen from the Oyak River

- Coat of arms

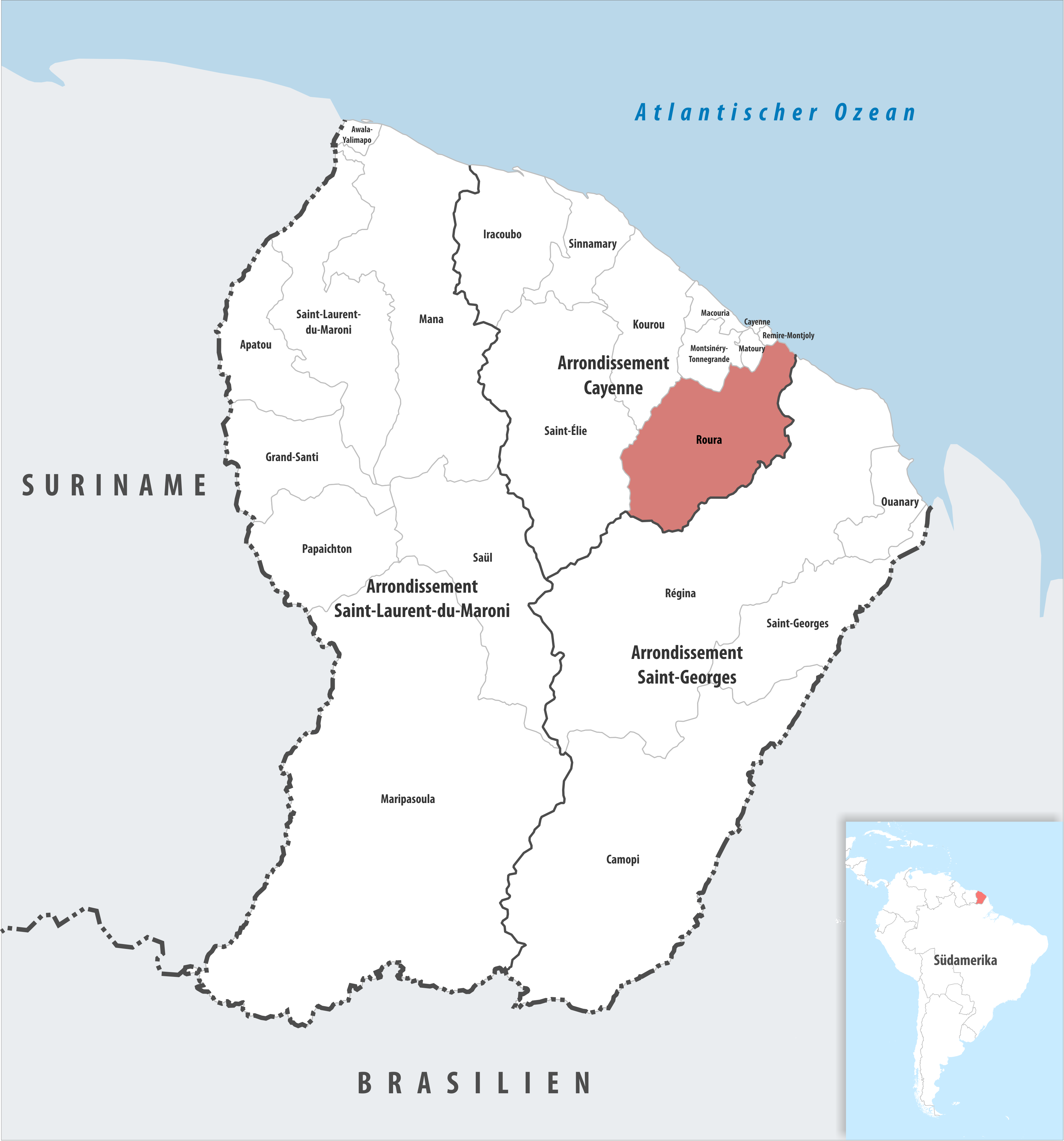
- Location of the commune (in red) within French Guiana
- Location of Roura
- Coordinates: 4°43′27″N 52°19′17″W
- Country: France
- Overseas region and department: French Guiana
- Arrondissement: Cayenne
- Intercommunality: CA Centre Littoral

Government
  - Mayor (2020–2026): Jean-Claude Labrador
- Area^{1}: 3,902.5 km^{2} (1,506.8 sq mi)
- Elevation: 231 m (758 ft)
- Highest elevation: 337 m (1,106 ft)
- Lowest elevation: 0 m (0 ft)
- Population (2023): 3,449
  - Density: 0.8838/km^{2} (2.289/sq mi)
- Time zone: UTC−03:00
- INSEE/Postal code: 97310 /97311
- ^{1} French Land Register data, which excludes lakes, ponds, glaciers > 1 km^{2} (0.386 sq mi or 247 acres) and river estuaries.

Roura (French pronunciation: [ʁuʁa]) is a commune of French Guiana, an overseas region and department of France in South America. The coastal commune is bordered by Matoury and Montsinéry-Tonnegrande in the North, Kourou and Saint-Elie in the North West and West, and finally by Régina in the South and East. It includes the town of Roura and the village of Cacao, and features vast protected natural areas like the Kaw-Roura Marshland Nature Reserve. The local economy depends on agriculture, and eco-tourism.

== History ==
The town of Roura was founded in 1675 by Jesuits. In 1786, Marquis de Lafayette attempted an early emancipation of the slaves by allowing small scale agriculture on the savanna Gabriel near Roury. The experiment failed, and was abandoned in 1796. Between 1809 and 1817, Roura was captured by the Portuguese and became part of Brazil. In 1848, slavery was abolished in the island.

In 1977, Cacao village was established for Hmong farmers. The population were refugees from Laos who were resettled in French Guiana. They settled here as living, and working conditions were similar to their native land.

== Geography ==
Roura is a commune situated in French Guiana, an overseas region and department of France on the northern coast of South America. The commune's area is approximately 3,902.5 km^{2} (1,506.8 sq mi). It is bordered by Matoury and Montsinéry-Tonnegrande in the North, Kourou and Saint-Elie in the North West and West, and finally by Régina in the South and East. French Guiana is predominantly covered by dense, equatorial rainforest, part of the vast Guiana Shield, and the coastal strip, where the majority of the population resides, is generally low-lying and swampy. The region experiences a tropical climate with high humidity and consistent temperatures throughout the year.

In 1998, the Kaw-Roura Marshland Nature Reserve was established, which covers an area of 94,700 hectares in Roura and Régina. Kaw Mountain, standing at 276 m (906 ft) is located in the broader region of Roura Kaw-reserve. The Trésor Regional Nature Reserve is a 2,464 hectares nature reserve situated on the flank of the Kaw Mountain. It became a protected area in 2010.

== Demographics ==
Roura is home to diverse communities, including the Palikur Amerindian community settled in Favard village along the Oyack River and the Hmong village of Cacao, established for refugees from Laos.

Historical population
Year	Pop.	±% p.a.
1967	393	—
1974	401	+0.29%
1982	943	+11.28%
1990	1,314	+4.23%
1999	1,791	+3.50%
2007	2,823	+5.85%
2012	3,050	+1.56%
2017	3,783	+4.40%
2023	3,449	−1.53%
Source: INSEE

== Transport ==
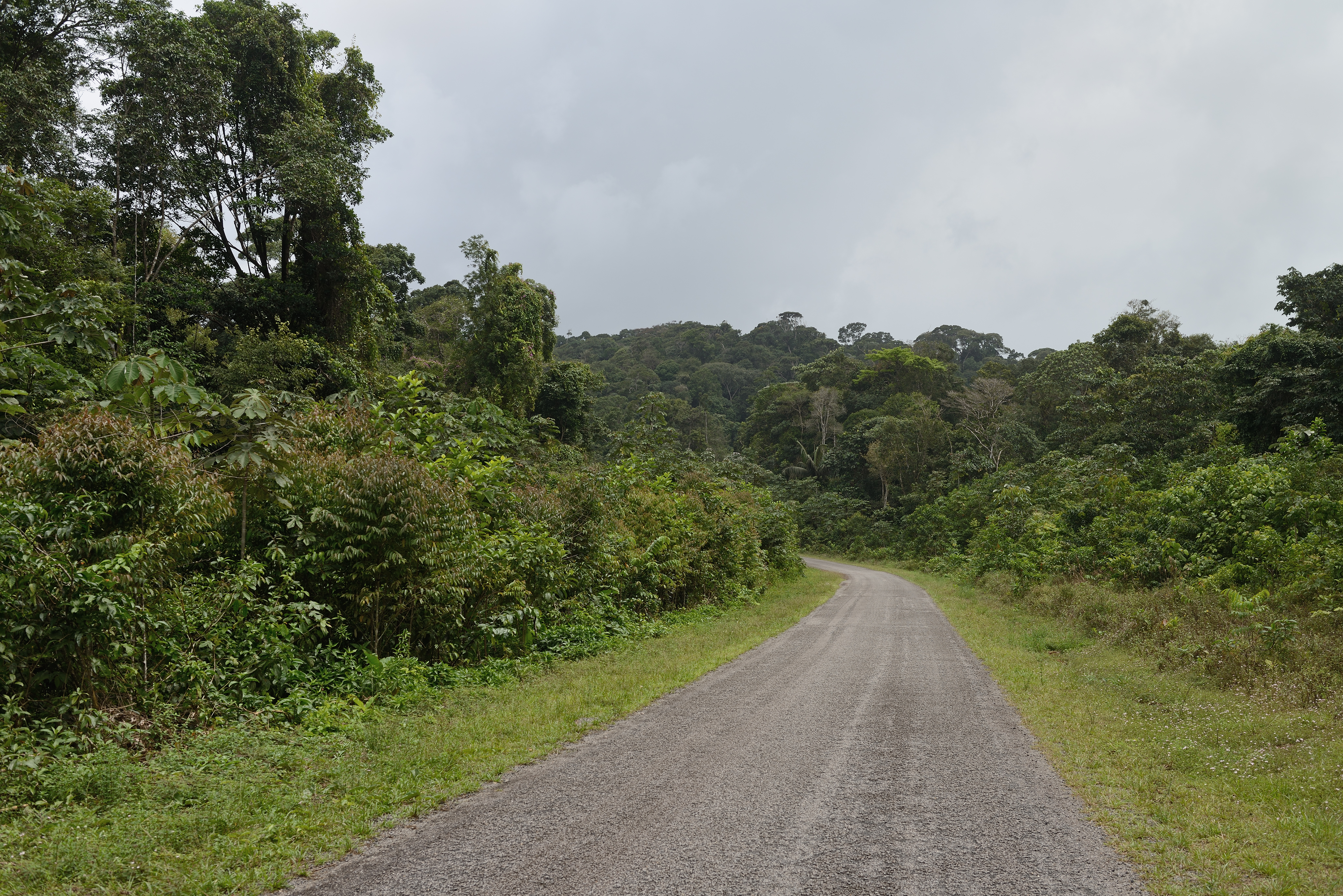
Road to Kaw

The city of Roura is connected by two major roads. The Route nationale 2 leads to the towns of Régina and Saint-Georges. The RD6 road connects to Kaw. This 70 km-long (43 mi) road follows a thalweg through the forests.

== See also ==
- Communes of French Guiana
