= Pointe Béhague =

Coordinates: 4.66814°N 51.89049°W

The Pointe Béhague or Pointe Coumarouman or even Ponta de Cumarumã (in Portuguese) is a cape in north-east French Guiana, lying between the mouths of Approuague and Oiapoque rivers. It is located in the commune of Ouanary

== See also ==
- Pointe Isère
