= Nicolas David Guisan =

Swiss plantation owner and slave owner in Suriname (1727–1781)

- Born: 1727; Avenches, Switzerland
- Died: 1781 (aged 53–54); Paramaribo, Suriname
- Occupations: Plantation owner, plantation administrator, chamois leather maker
- Children: Nanetta Gerarda Guisan (recognized daughter)
- Parent(s): Jean Jacques Guisan; Suzanne Catherine Marnet

Nicolas David Guisan (1727–1781) was a Swiss plantation owner and administrator in the Dutch colony of Suriname. Born in Avenches, he emigrated to Suriname where he became a prominent planter and slave owner, controlling multiple sugar and coffee plantations with over 450 enslaved people.

== Early life and emigration ==
Nicolas David Guisan was born in 1727 in Avenches to Jean Jacques Guisan and Suzanne Catherine Marnet. He grew up in a family of six children and was the uncle of Jean Samuel Guisan. He remained unmarried throughout his life. Originally trained as a chamois leather maker (chamoiseur), Guisan made the decision to emigrate to the Dutch colony of Suriname in South America.

In 1759, Guisan arrived in Suriname from Rotterdam aboard the ship Elisabeth. He established himself in the colony as a planter and formed a business partnership with Amédée Sugnens, who was from Moudon and had served as a camp minister in the Jenner regiment in Dutch service before becoming a pastor of the French Church in Paramaribo.

== Plantation ownership ==
Together with Sugnens, Guisan became the owner of three major plantations. They acquired two sugar plantations, La Liberté and Accaribo, located near Paramaribo on the Suriname River. They also owned a coffee plantation called Lelijendaal on the Commewijne River. These three properties were cultivated by more than 450 enslaved people, making Guisan one of the significant slave owners in the colony.

Following Sugnens' death at sea in 1773, his sister Rosa Dutoit took over the management of these estates in partnership with Guisan. This arrangement continued the operation of the plantations under their joint control.

== Plantation administration ==
Beyond his own properties, Guisan served as an administrator for several other plantations owned by absentee proprietors. He was responsible for overseeing the plantations and appointing directors whose work he supervised. Plantation administrators held high social positions in Surinamese colonial society.

Guisan administered approximately ten plantations, either alone or in partnership with others, particularly F.-L. Chaillet from Neuchâtel. Among the plantations under his administration were Mat Rouge, a sugar plantation with 110 enslaved people on the Perica waterway near the Cottica River; Mijn Geluk on the Orleane River east of Paramaribo; and Groot Chattillon on the Suriname River.

He also administered plantations belonging to Pierre-Alexandre DuPeyrou of Neuchâtel, including La Nouvelle Espérance, Perou (a coffee plantation with 113 enslaved people), and Libanon (a sugar plantation with 161 enslaved people), all located on the Cottica River.

== Economic decline and death ==
Around 1772–1773, the economic situation in Suriname deteriorated due to competition from sugar and coffee produced in Saint-Domingue (modern-day Haiti), which was protected by France's mercantilist policies. This economic downturn caused Guisan to suffer significant financial losses.

By the time of his death in 1781 in Paramaribo, Guisan's financial situation had become so dire that the liquidation of his estate proved to be deficit. In his will, Guisan granted freedom to Nanetta Gerarda Guisan, whom he recognized as his legitimate daughter. She was apparently born from his relationship with his enslaved woman Johanna La Liberté. Nanetta subsequently married the Dutchman Gerrit van der Kolk.

== Bibliography ==
- David, Thomas; Etemad, Bouda; Schaufelbuehl, Janick Marina: La Suisse et l'esclavage des Noirs, 2005.
- Fässler, Hans: Une Suisse esclavagiste. Voyage dans un pays au-dessus de tout soupçon, 2007 (German edition 2005).
- Guisan, Jean Samuel: Le Vaudois des terres noyées. Ingénieur à la Guiane française, 1777-1791, edited by Yannick Le Roux, Olivier Pavillon and Kristen Sarge, 2012.

== Attribution ==
- This article incorporates text from a free content work. Licensed under CC-BY SA. Text taken from Nicolas David Guisan, Olivier Pavillon, Historical Dictionary of Switzerland.
