= Regina, French Guiana =

Commune in French Guiana, France

Régina
- Commune
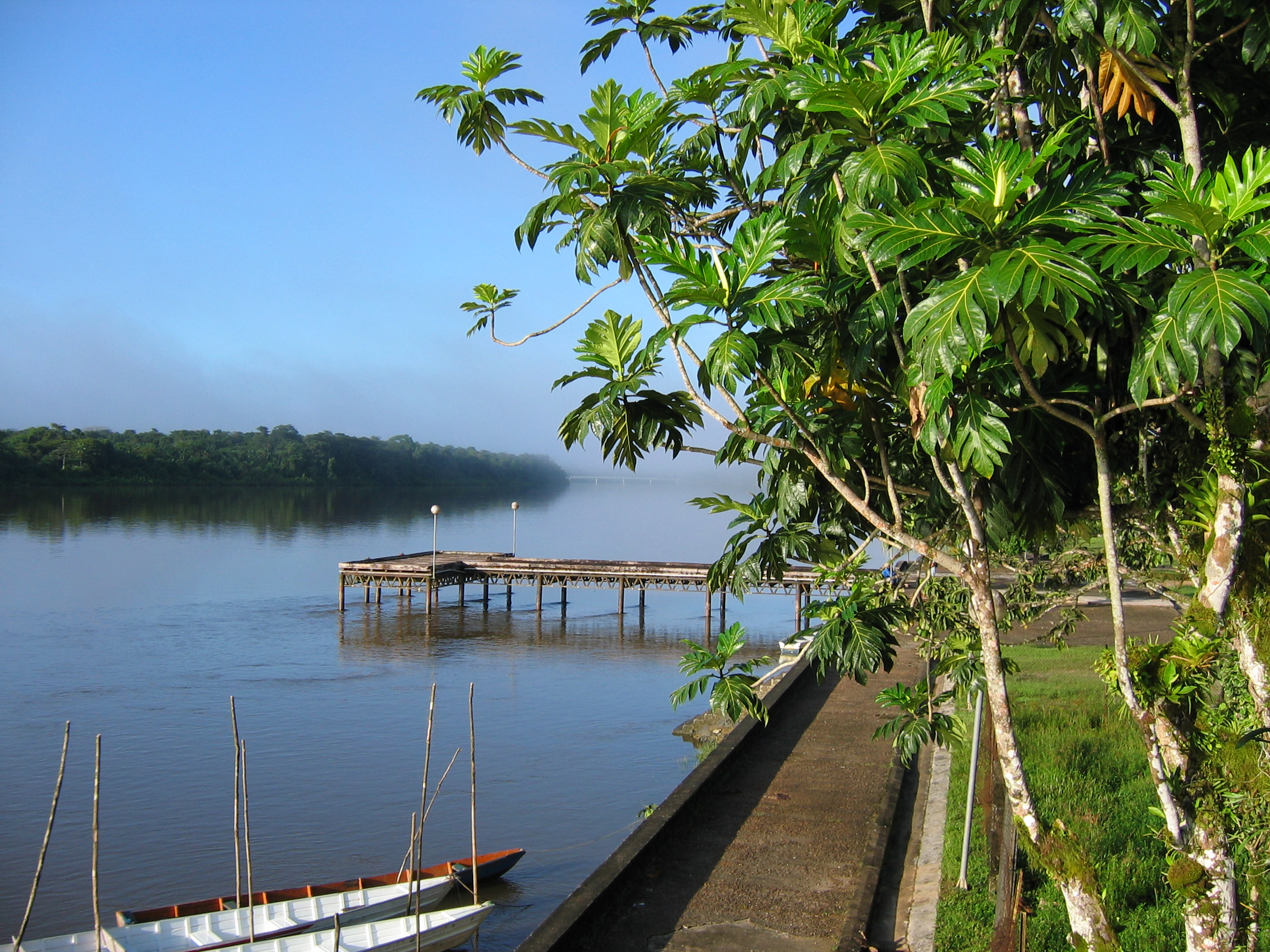
- A view of the Approuague from Regina

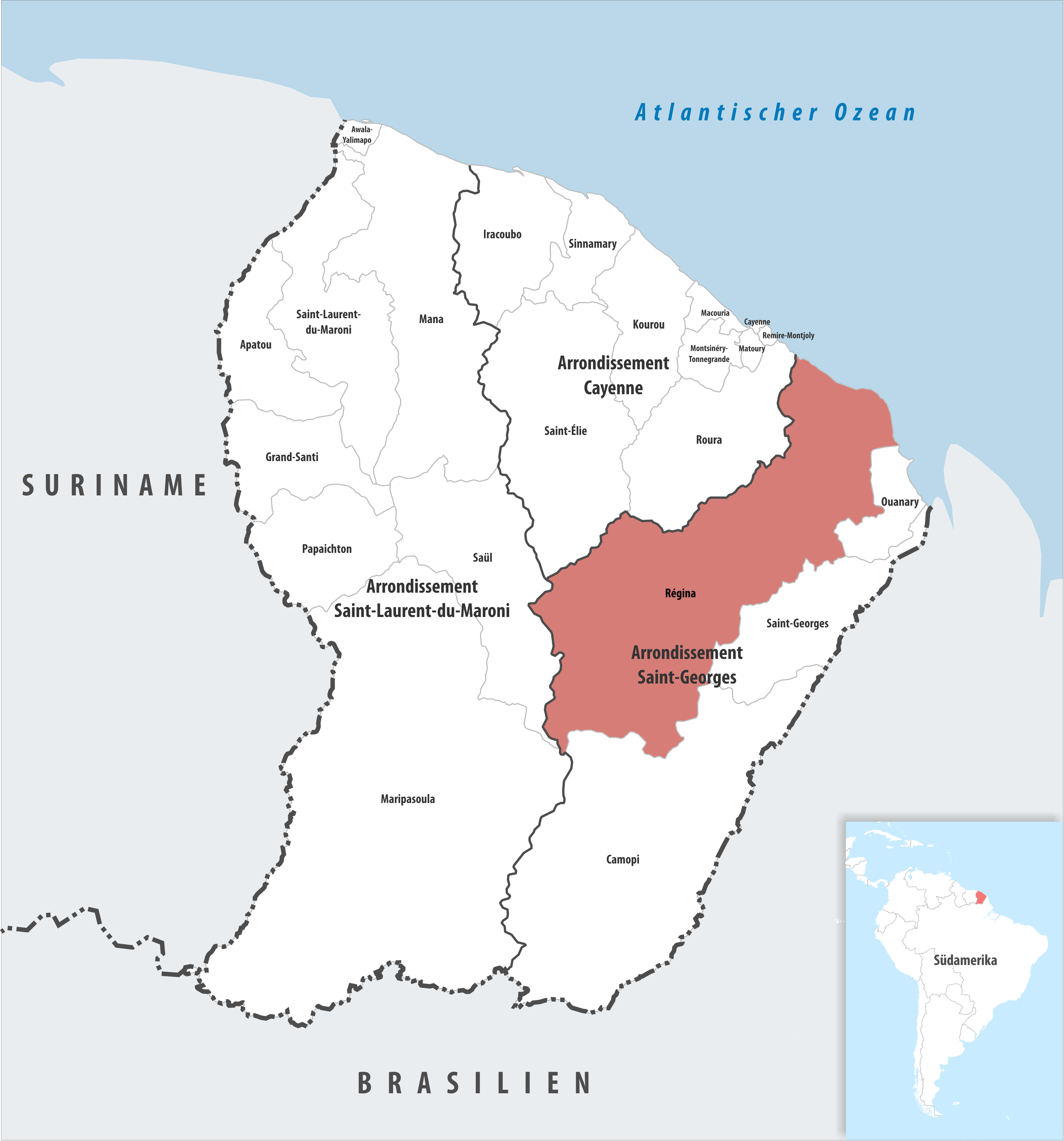
- Location of the commune (in red) within French Guiana
- Location of Régina
- Coordinates: 4°18′42″N 52°08′13″W
- Country: France
- Overseas region and department: French Guiana
- Arrondissement: Saint-Georges
- Intercommunality: Est Guyanais

Government
  - Mayor (2020–2026): Pierre Désert
- Area^{1}: 12,130 km^{2} (4,680 sq mi)
- Population (2023): 1,658
  - Density: 0.1367/km^{2} (0.3540/sq mi)
- Time zone: UTC−03:00
- INSEE/Postal code: 97301 /97390
- ^{1} French Land Register data, which excludes lakes, ponds, glaciers > 1 km^{2} (0.386 sq mi or 247 acres) and river estuaries.

Régina (French pronunciation: [ʁeʒina]; French Guianese Creole: Réjina) is a commune of French Guiana, an overseas region and department of France located in South America. With a land area of 12,130 km^{2} (4,680 sq mi), it is the second-largest commune of France. The town is named after the first merchant who settled in the area.

== Overview ==
Régina lies on the Approuague River. In former times it was a gold mining centre. During the 1870s, it was home to several thousand people.

Guisanbourg was founded in April 1832 as the administrative centre. After the discovery gold, Régina became more important. In 1936, Régina became the capital of the commune. In the 1980s, Guisanbourg became a ghost town.

== Villages ==
- Guisanbourg, former capital of the commune, and ghost town.
- Kaw

== Transport ==
Following the construction of a bridge over the Approuague River in 2003, an asphalted road from Régina to Saint-Georges de l'Oyapock (a town by the Brazilian border) was opened in 2004, completing the road from Cayenne (the préfecture and largest city of French Guiana) to the Brazilian border. It is now possible to drive on a fully paved road from Saint-Laurent-du-Maroni on the Surinamese border to Oiapoque, Brazil.

== Nature ==
The Nouragues Nature Reserve is located near the town. The reserve was created in 1996, and covers 76,000 hectares.

In 1998, the Kaw-Roura Marshland Nature Reserve was established, and covers an area of 94,700 hectares between Roura and Régina, and is sometimes nicknamed "the Everglades of Guyana".

The Petite Montagnes Tortue Biological Reserve is located the commune. It is mountain range of quartz mountains which are home to many rare or endemic plants.

== Climate ==
Régina has a tropical rainforest climate (Köppen Af) with heavy to very heavy rainfall year-round.

Climate data for Régina
Month	Jan	Feb	Mar	Apr	May	Jun	Jul	Aug	Sep	Oct	Nov	Dec	Year
Mean daily maximum °C (°F)	28.8 (83.8)	28.7 (83.7)	29.5 (85.1)	29.3 (84.7)	29.2 (84.6)	29.8 (85.6)	30.4 (86.7)	31.5 (88.7)	32.1 (89.8)	32.2 (90.0)	31.6 (88.9)	29.7 (85.5)	30.2 (86.4)
Daily mean °C (°F)	25.4 (77.7)	25.3 (77.5)	25.8 (78.4)	25.8 (78.4)	25.7 (78.3)	25.7 (78.3)	25.8 (78.4)	26.3 (79.3)	26.5 (79.7)	26.4 (79.5)	26.4 (79.5)	25.6 (78.1)	25.9 (78.6)
Mean daily minimum °C (°F)	22.0 (71.6)	22.0 (71.6)	22.2 (72.0)	22.4 (72.3)	22.3 (72.1)	21.6 (70.9)	21.2 (70.2)	21.2 (70.2)	21.0 (69.8)	20.7 (69.3)	21.2 (70.2)	21.6 (70.9)	21.6 (70.9)
Average rainfall mm (inches)	430 (16.9)	354 (13.9)	367 (14.4)	409 (16.1)	567 (22.3)	434 (17.1)	250 (9.8)	167 (6.6)	97 (3.8)	107 (4.2)	193 (7.6)	369 (14.5)	3,744 (147.2)
Source: Climate-Data.org

== See also ==
- Communes of French Guiana
- Îles du Connétable
