= Jean Samuel Guisan =

Swiss engineer and civil servant

- Born: 29 March 1740; Avenches, Switzerland
- Died: 29 June 1801 (aged 61); Bern, Switzerland
- Occupations: engineer, civil servant
- Notable work: Kaw polders

Jean Samuel Guisan (29 March 1740 – 29 June 1801) was a Swiss engineer and civil servant known for his poldering work in the marshes near Kaw in French Guiana.

== Biography ==
Guisan was born in Avenches, Switzerland. In 1769, he moved to Suriname to work for Nicolaas Guisan, his uncle, who owned the plantation La Liberté. During 1772 and 1773, sugar and coffee prices were very low, and business was bad. Guisan was put in charge of the plantation Accaribo, and managed to turn the plantation into a profitable business.

In 1777, Guisan came to the attention of Pierre-Victor Malouet, who was on a mission by the French government to Suriname to discuss the 200 Maroons that had fled to French Guiana. Malouet persuaded Guisan to improve and develop agriculture on the lowlands of French Guiana, and appointed him captain of the colonial troops. Guisan started working on the area around Kaw, began poldering the banks of the Approuague and Kaw River, and supervised the digging of the Roy and Torcy canals. His efforts transformed the area into a flourishing agricultural region. He treated the slaves under his command harshly, claiming they were delaying the work by their slackness. Guisan also constructed the first sugar factory in the colony.

His ambitious plans for the colony, and complaints about the unhealthy living conditions were not well received. Guisan's opposition to Governor Lescalier led to his dismissal, and he left French Guiana for Switzerland in July 1791. Back in Avenches, he held some minor functions in the local government. He started writing his autobiography, and a book about poldering marshes. On 27 October 1798, Guisan was appointed Inspector General of Roads and Bridges of the Swiss Republic. He started to build bridges in Olten, the road from Zürich to Bremgarten, and Wettingen to Baden. On 29 July 1801, Guisan died in Bern. In April 1834, the town of Guisanbourg was named after Guisan.
