= Kaw-Roura Marshland Nature Reserve =

Protected area in French Guiana

- IUCN category IV (habitat/species management area)
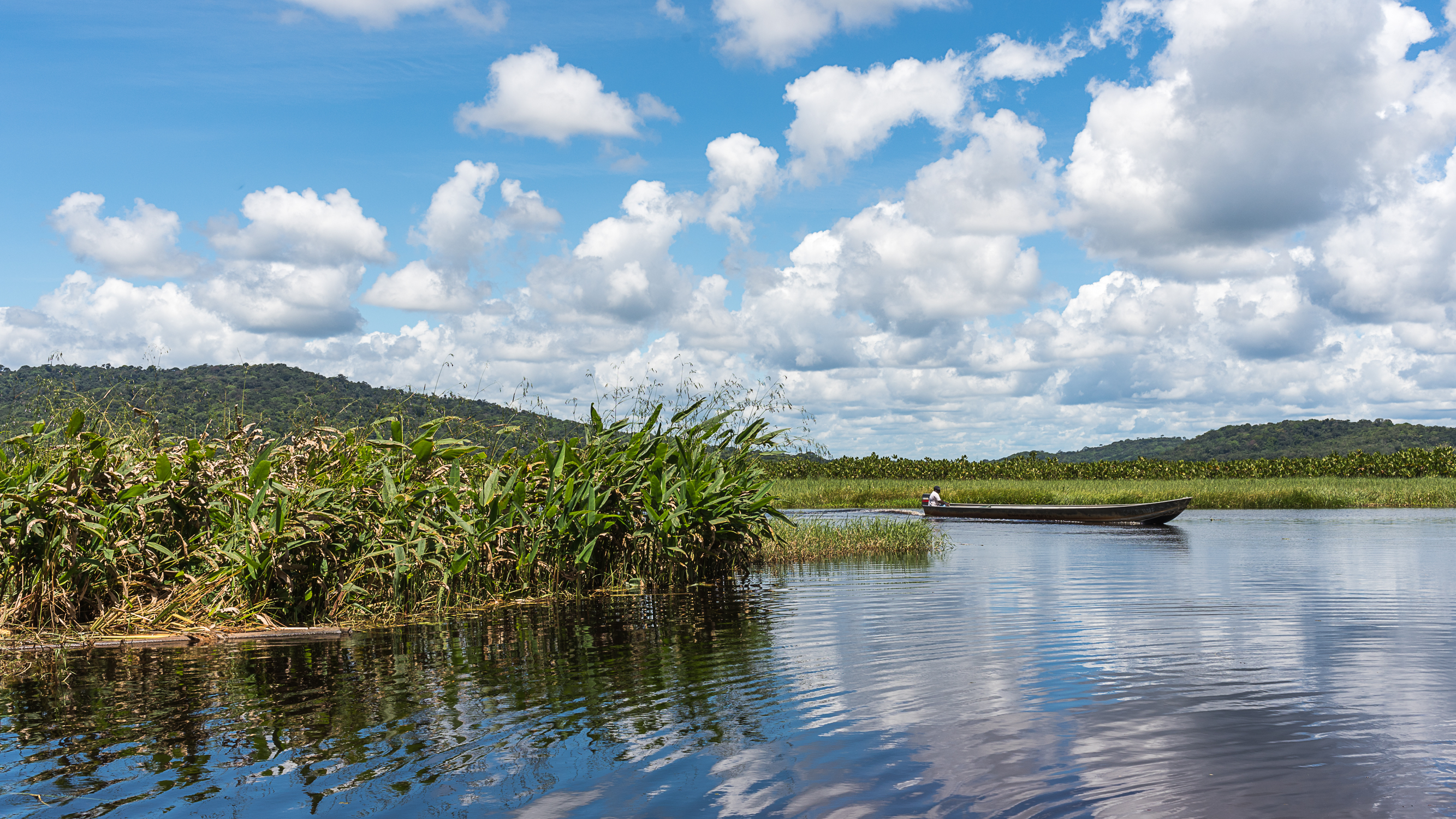

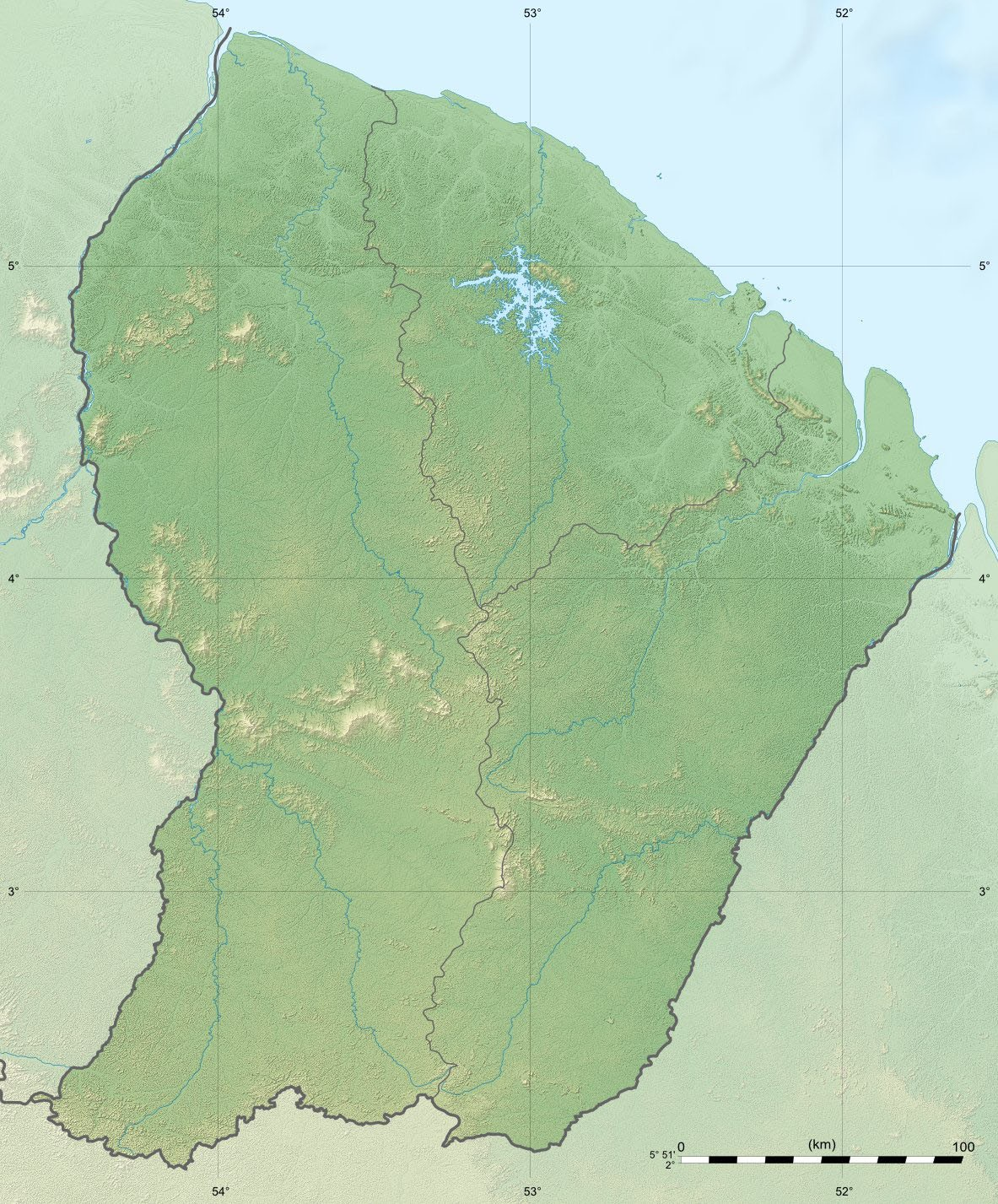
- Location within French Guiana
- Location: French Guiana, France
- Nearest city: Kaw
- Coordinates: 4.6538°N 52.0771°W
- Area: 947 km^{2} (366 sq mi)
- Established: 13 March 1998
- Governing body: Regional Natural Park of French Guiana
- Website: Marais-kaw.com (in French)

Ramsar Wetland
- Official name: Marais De Kaw
- Designated: 8 December 1993
- Reference no.: 644

The Kaw-Roura Marshland Nature Reserve (French: Réserve naturelle nationale des marais de Kaw-Roura) is a nature reserve in French Guiana, France. The reserve is a wetland, and can only be accessed by boat from Kaw.

== Overview ==
The Kaw-Roura Marshland Nature Reserve not only consists of marshland, but also contains mangrove forests, savannas, and tropical rainforests. The reserve measures 94,700 hectares, and is the largest wetland of France. It stretches from Roura to Régina, and from the Atlantic Ocean to the Amazonian rainforest. The marshland is fed by the Kaw River, the Approuague and the Angélique Creek.

The Kaw-Roura Marshland has been designated as a Ramsar site since 1993, and a nature reserve since 1998. The reserve is sometimes nicknamed "the Everglades of Guiana".

The village of Kaw is located inside the reserve.

== Flora and fauna ==
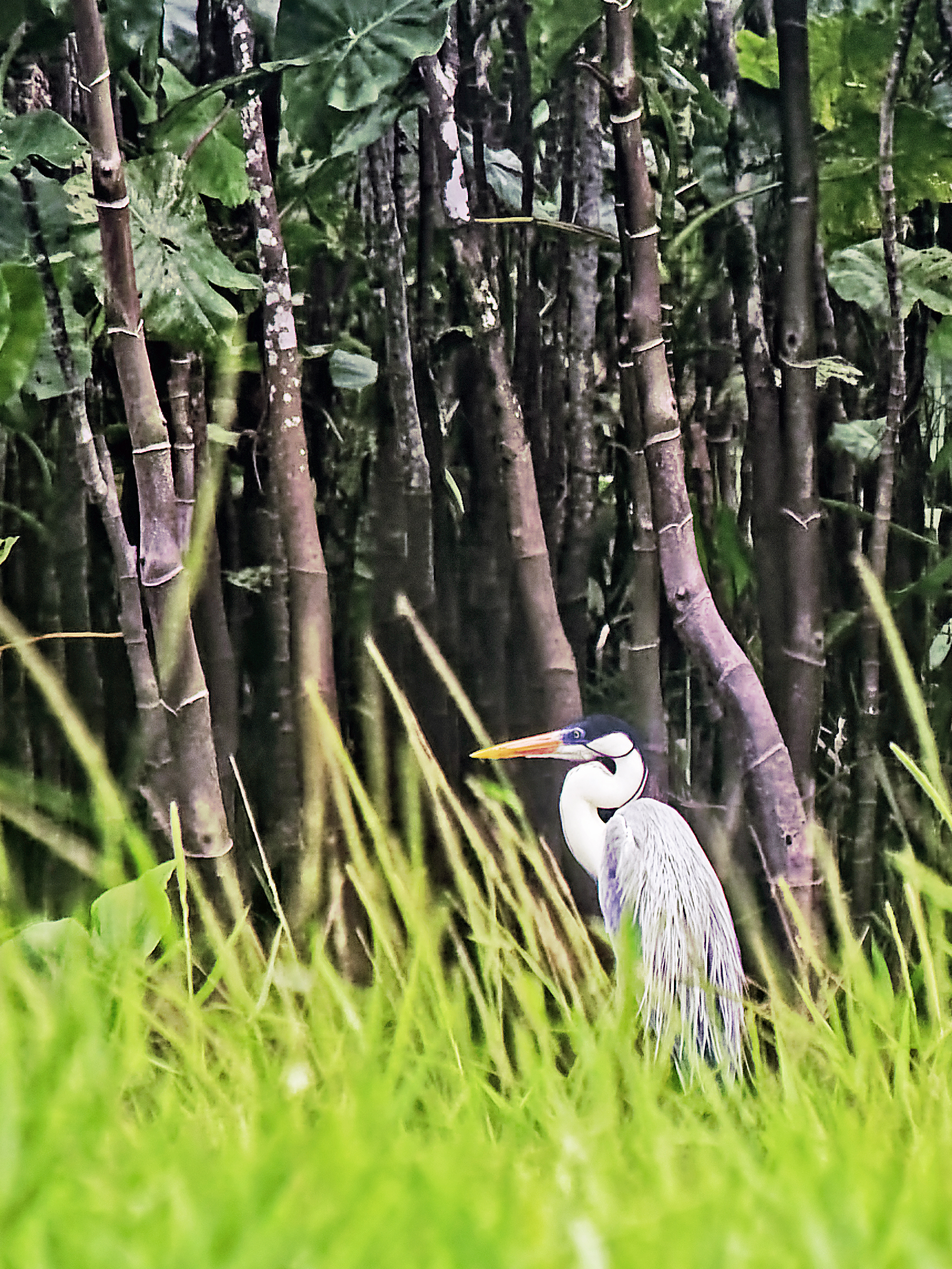
A heron in the bamboo

The Kaw-Roura Marshland Nature Reserve is home to more than half of the protected species of French Guiana, and includes the black caiman, manatees, the giant otter, the jaguar, and the matamata turtle.

The reserve attracts many birds, and is home to 535 bird species. It is an important breeding and wintering location for many waterbirds. Birds found in the reserve include the agami heron, the great egret, the cock-of-the-rock, and the crested eagle.
