= Approuague =

River in French Guiana

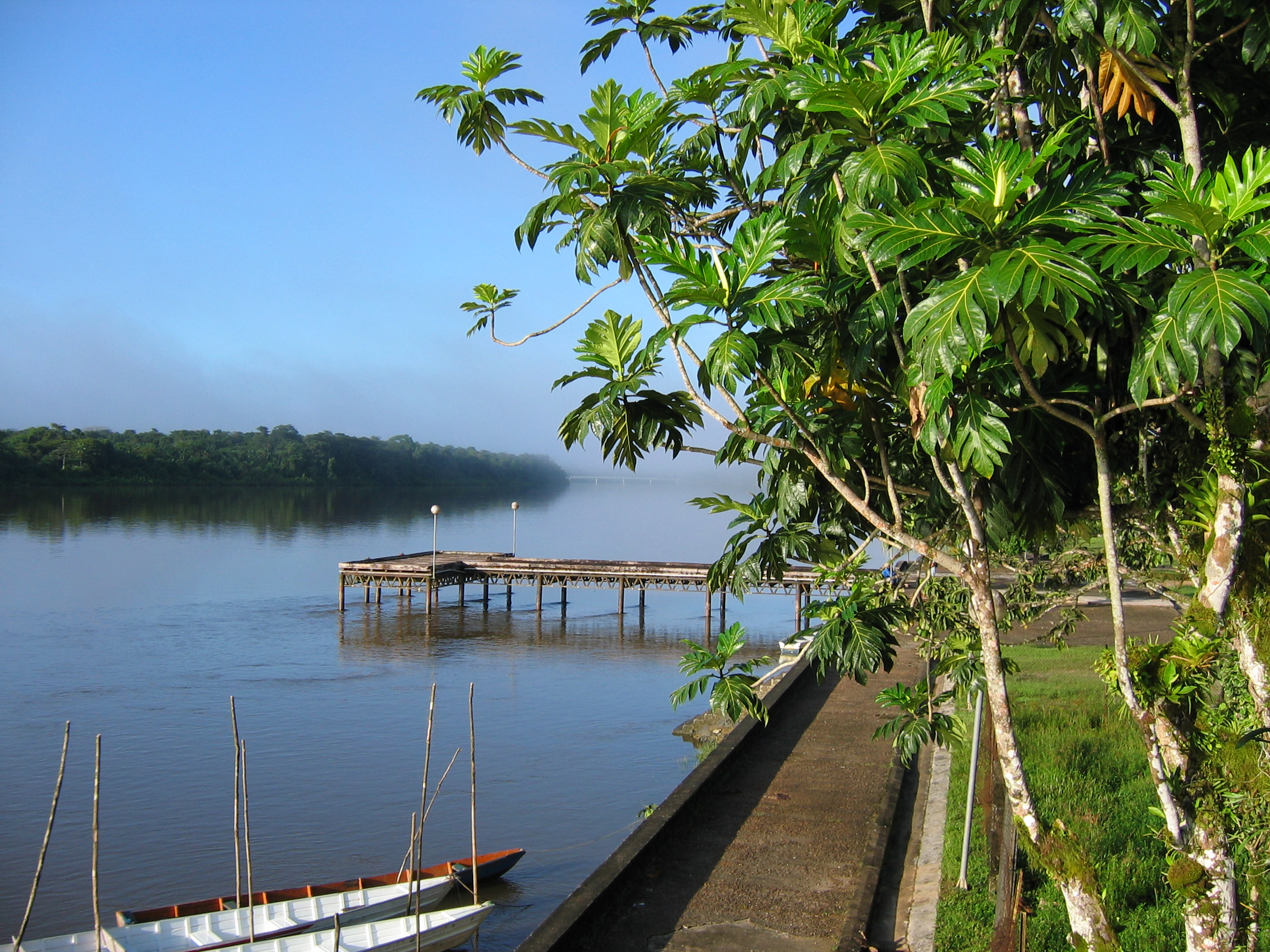
- View of the Approuague from Régina

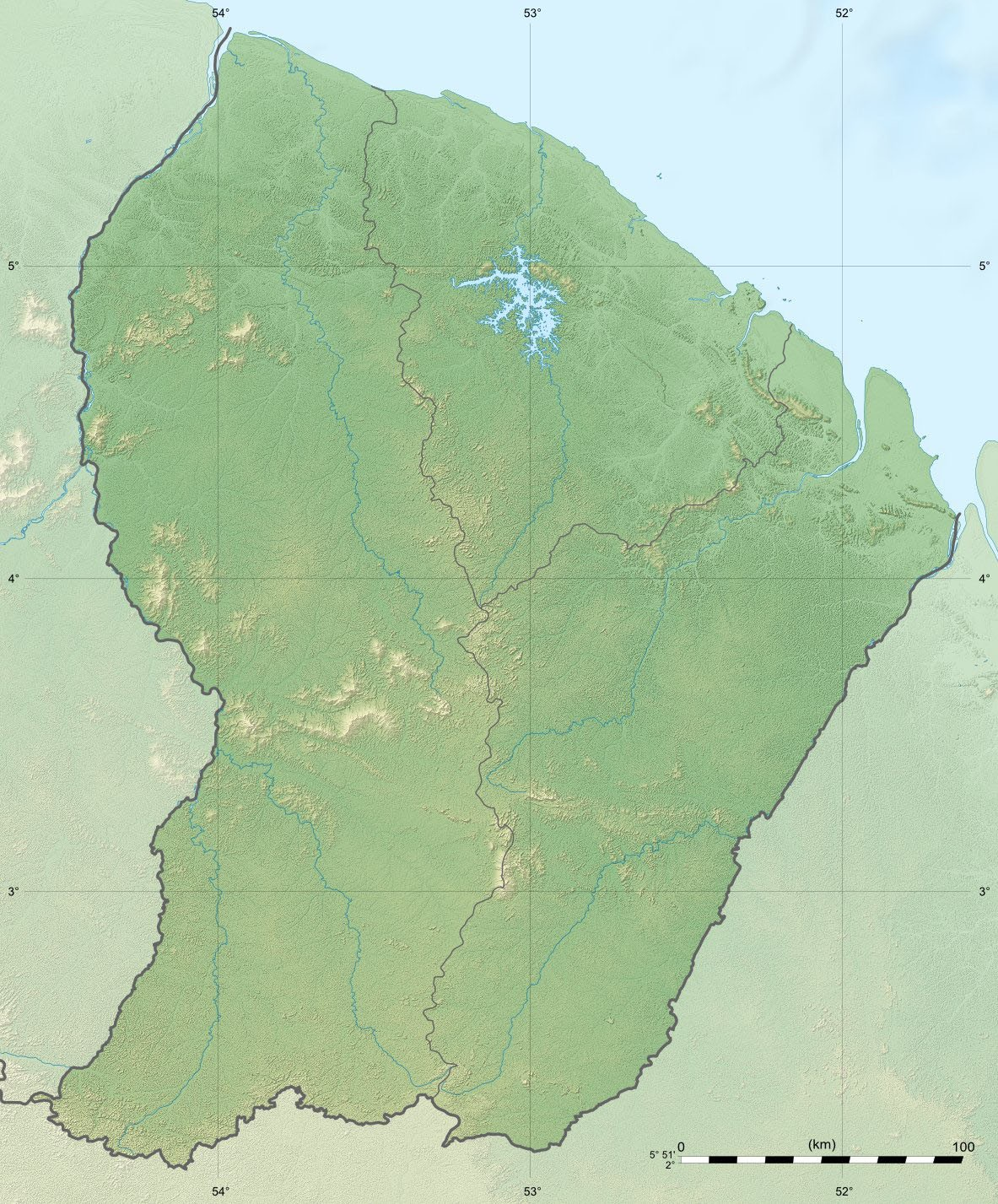
- Location of mouth

Location
- Country: France
- Region: French Guiana

Physical characteristics
- Mouth: Atlantic Ocean
  - coordinates: 4.6836°N 51.9613°W
- Length: 335 km (208 mi)

The Approuague (French pronunciation: [apʁuaɡ]) river (or Apuruaque in Tupi) is a major river in French Guiana. It is 335 km (208 mi) long. It runs north from the Tumuk Humak Mountains to the Atlantic Ocean, almost parallel with the Oyapock, with its mouth by the Pointe Béhague cape.

The Approuague Bridge is 2 kilometres (1.2 mi) south (upstream) of Régina.
