= Burin-Grand Bank =

Provincial electoral district in Newfoundland and Labrador, Canada

Newfoundland and Labrador electoral district

Provincial electoral district
- Legislature: Newfoundland and Labrador House of Assembly
MHA
Paul Pike
Liberal
- District created: 2015
- First contested: 2015
- Last contested: 2025

Demographics
- Population (2011): 12,545
- Electors (2015): 9,328
- Area (km²): 2,475
- Census division: Division No. 2
- Census subdivision(s): Bay L'Argent, Burin, Fortune, Fox Cove-Mortier, Frenchman's Cove, Garnish, Grand Bank, Lamaline, Lawn, Lewin's Cove, Little Bay East, Lord's Cove, Point May, Point au Gaul, St. Bernard's-Jacques Fontaine, St. Lawrence, Winterland

Burin-Grand Bank is a provincial electoral district in Newfoundland and Labrador, Canada, represented by a member in the Newfoundland and Labrador House of Assembly. It was contested for the first time in the 2015 provincial election. The district was created out of all of Grand Bank and parts of Burin-Placentia West and Bellevue.

The district contains a ferry serving St. Pierre and Miquelon, which is part of France, via a port in Fortune. The district also contains an intra-provincial ferry serving Rencontre East via Bay L'Argent.

== Members of the House of Assembly ==
The district has elected the following members of the House of Assembly:

Assembly	Years	Member	Party
48th	2015–2019	Carol Anne Haley	Liberal
49th	2019–2021	Carol Anne Haley	Liberal
50th	2021–2025	Paul Pike	Liberal
51st	2025–Present	Paul Pike	Liberal

== Election results ==
Graph of election results (minor parties that never got 2% of the vote or did not run consistently are omitted) View source data.

2025 Newfoundland and Labrador general election
Party	Candidate	Votes	%	±%
Liberal	Paul Pike	2,437	49.1%	-10.49
Progressive Conservative	Jamie Engram	2,384	48.0%	+11.37
New Democratic	Tori Locke	141	2.8%	-0.98
Total valid votes				
Total rejected ballots				
Turnout				
Eligible voters				
Liberal hold		Swing		-

2021 Newfoundland and Labrador general election
Party	Candidate	Votes	%	±%
Liberal	Paul Pike	2,666	59.59	+7.97
Progressive Conservative	Fred Dodge	1,639	36.63	-11.75
New Democratic	Alvin Banfield	169	3.78	
Total valid votes		4,474		
Total rejected ballots				
Turnout				
Eligible voters				
Liberal hold		Swing		+9.86
Source(s) "Officially Nominated Candidates General Election 2021" (PDF). Elections Newfoundland and Labrador. "NL Election 2021 (Unofficial Results)".

2019 Newfoundland and Labrador general election
Party	Candidate	Votes	%	±%
Liberal	Carol Anne Haley	2,822	51.62	-27.73
Progressive Conservative	Bill Matthews	2,645	48.39	+39.55
Total valid votes		5,467	99.02	
Total rejected ballots		54	0.98	+0.64
Turnout		5,521	65.70	+11.99
Eligible voters		8,403		
Liberal hold		Swing		-33.64

2015 Newfoundland and Labrador general election
Party	Candidate	Votes	%
Liberal	Carol Anne Haley	3,962	79.35
New Democratic	Ambrose Penton	590	11.82
Progressive Conservative	Terence Fleming	441	8.83
Total valid votes		4,993	99.66
Total rejected ballots		17	0.34
Turnout		5,010	53.71
Eligible voters		9,328	
Source: Elections Newfoundland and Labrador

== See also ==
- List of Newfoundland and Labrador provincial electoral districts
- Canadian provincial electoral districts
