= Newfoundland and Labrador Route 220 =

Highway in Newfoundland and Labrador

Route 220
- Burin Peninsula Highway; Heritage Run

Route information
- Maintained by Newfoundland and Labrador Department of Transportation and Infrastructure
- Length: 118 km (73 mi)

Major junctions
- West end: Route 210 in Grand Bank
- Route 222 in Burin; Route 221 in Burin; Route 220A in Marystown
- East end: Route 210 in Marystown

Location
- Country: Canada
- Province: Newfoundland and Labrador

Highway system
- Highways in Newfoundland and Labrador
← Route 215	→ Route 220A

Route 220 is the southern portion of the Heritage Run in the Canadian province of Newfoundland and Labrador, running along the southern and western coastlines of the Burin Peninsula of Newfoundland. It is a loop road, running due south from the town of Marystown and continues until the town of Grand Bank where it transitions into Route 210 - and vice versa. The speed limit along much of Route 220 is 80 km/h, except in communities where the speed limit is reduced to 50 km/h (however, through the town of Fortune, the speed limit is reduced to 30 km/h).

== Route description ==
Beginning at its western end, Route 220 begins as a continuation of Route 210 (Burin Peninsula Highway/Heritage Run) at an intersection with Marine Drive at the eastern end of Grand Bank. Route 220 bypasses the town to the south along Grandview Boulevard before leaving and heading west along the coastline for a few kilometres. The highway now passes through Fortune, where one can access the ferry to St. Pierre and Miquelon, before turning south to pass by Fortune Head and the towns of Lories and Point May. Route 220 heads eastward to pass through Calmer (minor settlement with only two dwellings) and Lamaline, where a local road provides access to the village of Allan's Island. It now meets a local road to Point au Gaul before passing through Taylor's Bay, Lord's Cove, Lawn, St. Lawrence, and Little St. Lawrence. Between Lord's Cove and Lawn, Route 220 meets local roads leading to Roundabout and Webbers Cove. The highway now winds its way northeast through inland rural terrain for several kilometres (where it has an intersection with local road leading to Epworth, Great Salmonier, Wandsworth, L'Anse-à-l'Eau, and Corbin) to pass through Lewin's Cove before entering Burin. Route 220 passes through the Salt Pond portion of town, where it has intersections with Route 222 (Salt Pond-Winterland Road) and Route 221 (Burin Road) before leaving Burin and winding its way along a lake for several kilometres to enter Marystown at an intersection/partial interchange with Route 220A (Creston Boulevard). The highway now passes through the Creston North neighbourhood along the Creston Causeway to cross a river before coming to an end at the western edge of town at another intersection with Route 210. As with most highways in Newfoundland and Labrador, the entire length of Route 220 is a two-lane highway.

== Major intersections ==
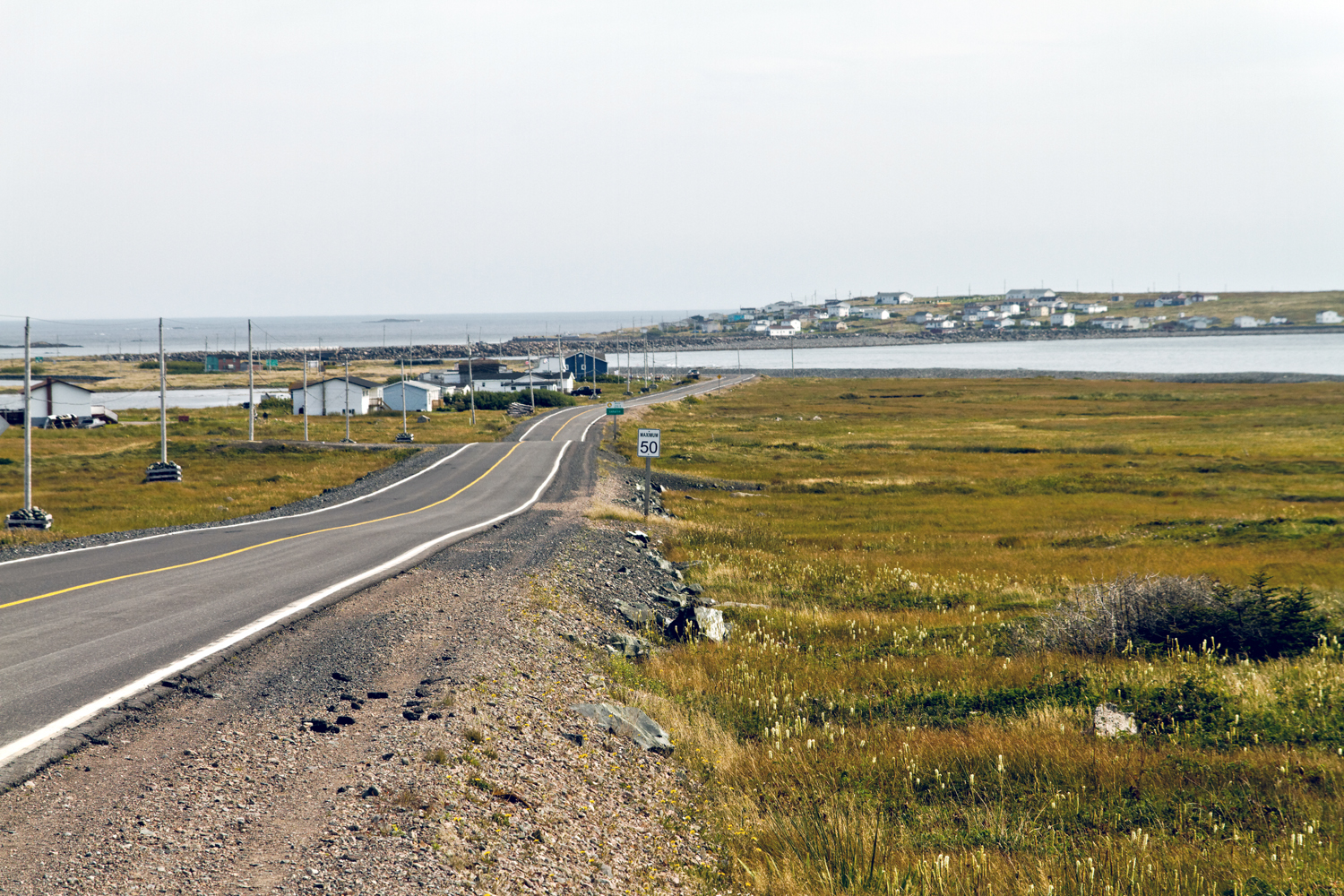
Route 220 in Lamaline

Location	km	mi	Destinations	Notes
Grand Bank	0.0	0.0	Transitions to Route 210 north (Burin Peninsula Highway/Heritage Run) to Route 1 (TCH) – Marystown	Western terminus
Fortune	8.1	5.0	Piercy Street - St. Pierre and Miquelon Ferry	
Fortune	10.8	6.7	Hornehouse Road - Fortune Head	
Lamaline	42.1	26.2	High Road - Allan's Island	
	46.3	28.8	Point au Gaul Road - Point au Gaul	
	65.3	40.6	Roundabout Road - Roundabout	
	65.5	40.7	Webbers Cove Road - Webbers Cove	
	102	63	Corbin Road - Epworth, Great Salmonier, Wandsworth, L'Anse-à-l'Eau, Corbin	
Burin	110	68	Route 222 north (Salt Pond-Winterland Road) – Winterland	Southern terminus of Route 222
Burin	111	69	Route 221 east (Burin Road) – Downtown, Port au Bras, Fox Cove-Mortier	Western terminus of Route 221
Marystown	115	71	Route 220A north (Creston Boulevard) – Downtown	Southern terminus of Route 220A
Marystown	118	73	Route 210 (Burin Peninsula Highway/Heritage Run) – Grand Bank, Fortune, Marystown	Eastern terminus
1.000 mi = 1.609 km; 1.000 km = 0.621 mi: Route transition
