= Burin Peninsula =

Peninsula on the south coast of Newfoundland, Canada

Coordinates: 47.38°N 55.11°W

Location of Burin Peninsula in Newfoundland

The Burin Peninsula (/ˈbjʊərɪn/ BURE-in) is a peninsula located on the south coast of the island of Newfoundland in the province of Newfoundland and Labrador. Marystown is the largest population centre on the peninsula.

The Burin Peninsula extends to the southwest from the main island of Newfoundland, separating Fortune Bay to the west from Placentia Bay to the east. It measures approximately 130 km (81 mi) in length and between 15 and 30 kilometres (9.3–18.6 mi) in width. It is connected by a 30 km (19 mi) wide isthmus between Terrenceville and Monkstown.

It was originally named the Buria Peninsula by fishermen from the Basque region during the 16th century. The peninsula is also known as "The Boot" because of its shape.

== Economy ==
For centuries, there were plentiful cod, other fish and crustaceans in the area. The seafood supplied a thriving fishing industry. The eventual collapse of the Atlantic northwest cod fishery led to local mass unemployment during the second half of the 1990s.

In response to a decline in the cod fishery industry, the Newfoundland government refurbished the Marystown shipyard in 1992. Ownership left Canada when the American company Friede Goldman Ltd. bought the facility in 1998, and remained in American hands when ownership changed again in 2002 to Kiewit Offshore Services Ltd. By 2019, the shipyard had been idle for four years and was acquired by Marbase Marystown Inc. (usually just Marbase), under a 20-year lease with the intention of establishing a service hub supporting regional aquaculture, the first of its kind in Canada. Marbase is a partnership between one Newfoundland businessman, Paul Antle, and the Norwegian company Amar Group AS.

In 2019, Marbase Cleanerfish Ltd., began work on a commercial lumpfish hatchery in Marystown, with an anticipated customer base of Atlantic salmon farm operators. As of 2020, government approval of the work in relation to environmental impact had not yet been completed.

Fluorspar (also called fluorite) deposits had been noted on the peninsula as early as 1843; however, it was not until 1933 that mining began. The operation was started by American Walter Siebert whose company was named the St. Lawrence Corporation of Newfoundland. Backbreaking work and no pay initially, finally led to a more significant mine by 1937; a second mine also opened in 1937, the American Newfoundland Fluorspar Company. The fluorspar mines in St. Lawrence were major employers until business declined in the 1970s; the mines had closed by 1978. In 2011, Canada Fluorspar Inc. outlined preparations to open a fluorspar mine on the site of the old mine. The federal government provided $5 million in funding in 2017 and the provincial government provided a loan of $17 million to finance the re-opening. Production finally commenced in mid-2018.

== Communities ==
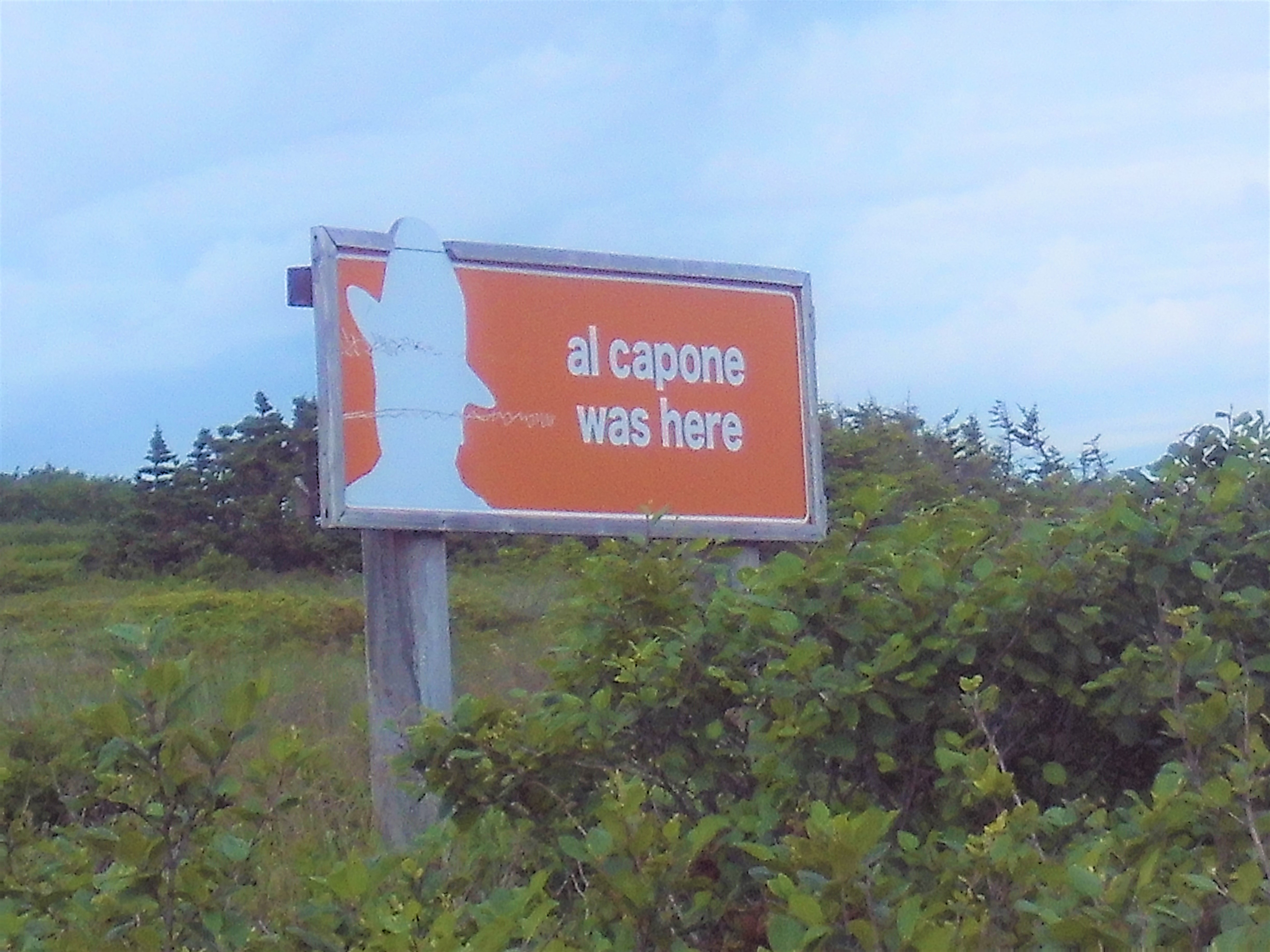
Al Capone sign near Point May

Route 210 traverses the length of the Burin Peninsula, running along the northwest side of the peninsula between Marystown and Fortune. Route 220 runs from Fortune to Marystown on the southern side. A short connecting road Route 222 runs between these two roads west of Marystown. Routes 211, 212, 213, 214, 215, and 221 are numbered local roads.

The Burin Peninsula's economy is tied to the ocean, consequently most of its settlements are located on the coast; some are outports and have no road connection (such as South East Bight). Rencontre East, another isolated community, is accessible by a ferry port in Bay L'Argent and travels to Pool's Cove on the Connaigre Peninsula via Rencontre East.

The French Islands of St. Pierre et Miquelon are the last colonies of France in North America, they are located 25 kilometres (16 mi) ferry ride from Fortune.

Communities on the north coast of the peninsula, beginning in the east:

- Terrenceville
- Harbour Mille
- Little Harbour East
- Bay L'Argent
- St. Bernard's-Jacques Fontaine
- Point Enragée
- Garnish
- Frenchman's Cove
- L'Anse-au-Loup
- Grand Bank
- Fortune

Communities on the south coast of the peninsula, beginning in the west:

- Lories
- Point May
- Calmer
- High Beach
- Allan's Island
- Lamaline
- Point au Gaul
- Taylor's Bay
- Lord's Cove
- Roundabout
- Lawn
- Little St. Lawrence
- St. Lawrence
- Epworth
- Lewin's Cove
- Burin Bay Arm
- Burin
- Port au Bras
- Fox Cove-Mortier
- Little Bay, Placentia Bay
- Creston
- Creston North
- Marystown
- Spanish Room
- Rock Harbour
- Jean De Baie
- Red Harbour
- Rushoon
- Baine Harbour
- Parkers Cove
- Boat Harbour West
- Boat Harbour
- Brookside
- Davis Cove
- Sandy Harbour
- Monkstown
- Great Paradise
- Little Paradise
- St. Joseph's
- Port Anne
- Petite Forte
- Clattice Harbour
- Clattice South West
- Burnt Island
- Murphy's Cove
- Isle Valen
- Darby's Harbour
- Great Bona
- Little Bona
- Southeast Bight
- Toslow
- Presque
- Saint Annes
- Saint Leonards
- Winterland

== See also ==
- 1929 Grand Banks earthquake
- Frenchman's Cove Provincial Park
- St. Lawrence Laurentians
