= Newfoundland and Labrador Route 220A =

Highway in Newfoundland and Labrador

Route 220A
- Creston Boulevard

Route information
- Auxiliary route of Route 220
- Maintained by Newfoundland and Labrador Department of Transportation and Infrastructure
- Length: 5.3 km (3.3 mi)

Major junctions
- South end: Route 220 in Marystown
- North end: Route 210 in Marystown

Location
- Country: Canada
- Province: Newfoundland and Labrador

Highway system
- Highways in Newfoundland and Labrador
← Route 220	→ Route 221

Route 220A, also known as Creston Boulevard, is a short 5.3-kilometre-long (3.3 mi) north–south highway located entirely in the town of Marystown on the island of Newfoundland. It connects the Creston neighbourhood of town with the downtown area. Route 220A also represents the former alignment of Route 220 prior to its realignment onto the Creston Causeway.

== Route description ==
Route 220A begins at an intersection/partial interchange in Creston with Route 220 (Creston Boulevard/Creston Causeway). It heads northeast through neighbourhoods for a few kilometres, where it has an intersection with Marine Drive (which provides access to Little Bay and Beau Bois), before crossing a bridge over a river into downtown. The highway immediately has an interchange with Ville Marie Drive before passing by a few businesses and coming to an end at an intersection with Route 210 (Columbia Drive/McGettigan Boulevard).

== Major intersections ==
The entire route is in Marystown.

km	mi	Destinations	Notes
0.0	0.0	Route 220 (Creston Causeway/Creston Boulevard) – Burin, St. Lawrence, Grand Bank	Southern terminus
4.4	2.7	Marine Drive - Little Bay, Beau Bois	
4.8– 5.1	3.0– 3.2	Ville Marie Drive	Interchange
5.3	3.3	Route 210 (Columbia Drive/McGettigan Boulevard) to Route 1 (TCH) – Grand Bank, Swift Current	Northern terminus; Burin Peninsula Highway/Heritage Run
1.000 mi = 1.609 km; 1.000 km = 0.621 mi
