= Newfoundland and Labrador Route 222 =

Highway in Newfoundland and Labrador, Canada

Route 222
- Salt Pond–Winterland Road

Route information
- Maintained by Newfoundland and Labrador Department of Transportation and Infrastructure
- Length: 10.3 km (6.4 mi)

Major junctions
- South end: Route 220 in Burin
- North end: Route 210 in Winterland

Location
- Country: Canada
- Province: Newfoundland and Labrador

Highway system
- Highways in Newfoundland and Labrador
← Route 221	→ Route 230

Route 222, also known as Salt Pond–Winterland Road, is a 10.3-kilometre-long (6.4 mi) north–south highway on the island of Newfoundland. It lies on the Burin Peninsula and connects the town of Winterland (at Route 210) with the Salt Pond portion of Burin (at Route 220). There no other major intersections or communities of any kind throughout its length.

== Major intersections ==
Location	km	mi	Destinations	Notes
Burin	0.0	0.0	Route 220 (Burin Peninsula Highway/Heritage Run) – St. Lawrence, Lewin's Cove, Marystown Eagle Road To Route 221 – Port au Bras, Fox Cove-Mortier	Southern terminus; road continues south as Eagle Road
Winterland	10.3	6.4	Route 210 (Burin Peninsula Highway/Heritage Run) to Route 1 (TCH) – Grand Bank, Fortune, Marystown	Northern terminus
1.000 mi = 1.609 km; 1.000 km = 0.621 mi
