= Newfoundland and Labrador Route 221 =

Highway in Newfoundland and Labrador

Route 221
- Burin Road

Route information
- Maintained by Newfoundland and Labrador Department of Transportation and Infrastructure
- Length: 15.9 km (9.9 mi)

Major junctions
- West end: Route 220 in Burin
- East end: Anile’s Cove Road / Dimmer’s Lane in Fox Cove-Mortier

Location
- Country: Canada
- Province: Newfoundland and Labrador

Highway system
- Highways in Newfoundland and Labrador
← Route 220A	→ Route 222

Route 221, also known as Burin Road, is a 15.9-kilometre-long (9.9 mi) east–west highway on the Burin Peninsula of the island of Newfoundland in the province of Newfoundland and Labrador. It connects Fox Cove-Mortier with Port au Bras, Burin, and Route 220 (Burin Peninsula Highway).

== Route description ==
Route 221 begins in Burin in the Salt Pond portion of town at an intersection with Route 220. It heads south along an inland waterway to pass through Burin Bay Arm, Little Salmonier, Long Cove, and Downtown to come to an intersection with Main Street, which provides access to many of the other neighbourhoods of town. The highway now heads east to pass through Bulls Cove to leave Burin and pass through Port au Bras. Route 221 now enters Fox Cove-Mortier and passes through the Mortier portion of town before passing through rural wooded areas for a few kilometres. Route 221 now enters Fox Cove and passes through neighbourhoods before coming to an end at an intersection with Anile's Cove Road and Dimmer's Lane.

== Major intersections ==
Location	km	mi	Destinations	Notes
Burin	0.0	0.0	Route 220 (Burin Peninsula Highway/Heritage Run) – Marystown, Winterland, St. Lawrence	Western terminus
Burin	6.5	4.0	Main Street - Burin Bay, Ship Cove, Collin's Cove	
Fox Cove-Mortier	15.9	9.9	Anile's Cove Road / Dimmer's Lane	Eastern terminus; end of provincial maintenance; road continues for a short distance as Anile's Cove Road
1.000 mi = 1.609 km; 1.000 km = 0.621 mi
