= Lanier W. Phillips =

American sailor

Lanier W. Phillips ONL (March 14, 1923 – March 11, 2012) was a survivor of the wreck of the USS Truxtun off the coast of Newfoundland, a retired oceanographer and a recipient of the U.S. Navy Memorial's Lone Sailor award for his distinguished post Navy civilian career. Phillips was an African American who was raised by sharecroppers in Lithonia, Georgia and who became the US Navy's first black sonar technician. Phillips died on March 12, 2012, at the Armed Forces Retirement Home in Gulfport, Mississippi.

== History ==
Phillips grew up in the South where the Ku Klux Klan was active and influential. Following in his parents footsteps, Phillips aspired to be a sharecropper. In 1941, when America entered WWII, Philips joined the Navy.

== Sinking of Truxtun ==
On February 18, 1942, Phillips was aboard USS Truxtun (DD-229) while she was battered by a severe winter storm. Eventually Truxtun and the supply ship USS Pollux (AKS-2) were forced onto the rocks of the southeast coast of Newfoundland. Hundreds of men from both ships died, but Phillips was among the survivors.

Initially afraid to leave his doomed ship because he thought he was off the coast of Iceland where he had been told blacks were forbidden to go ashore, Phillips boarded a lifeboat which capsized as it reached land. Exhausted and covered in oil that had leaked from the sinking ships, Phillips collapsed on the beach. Gently prodded to his feet by a local resident who told him he'd freeze to death if he didn't get up, Phillips was confronted by an experience that was totally new to him: "I had never heard a kind word from a white man in my life."

Phillips was taken to a place where the local women were washing oil from the survivors, and when they realized they could not scrub his skin white he was afraid their kind treatment would end. Instead a local woman, Violet Pike, insisted that he come home to her house where she nursed him with soup and put him to bed with blankets and rocks she had warmed on her wood stove.

Phillips went on to become the Navy's first black sonar technician . Vowing to do everything in his power to repay the kindness he had experienced in St. Lawrence, Phillips eventually donated enough money to St. Lawrence for them to build a children's playground.

After giving speeches at schools across the U.S., Phillips was awarded an honorary degree from Memorial University of Newfoundland in 2008 for his efforts to end discrimination. In 2011, Phillips was given honorary membership into the Order of Newfoundland and Labrador for his work in civil rights in the U.S. In 2012 Oil and Water, a play about Lanier's experience in St. Lawrence after the shipwreck and the influence it had on him, was produced by Newfoundland's Artistic Fraud theater company. In 2016, a picture book on Phillips' life, A Change of Heart, (ISBN 9781771083713, Nimbus Publishing) was released, written by Alice Walsh and Erin Bennett Banks.
