= Taylor's Bay =

Coordinates: 46°52′44″N 55°42′56″W

Taylor's Bay is a settlement located east of Lamaline in the province of Newfoundland and Labrador, between Point au Gaul and Lord's Cove. On a 1744 French map the cove was noted as Baye de Tailleur. William and Martha Bonnell, who had moved from Lamaline, are noted as the first settlers to the community.

The Taylor's Bay population was 82 in 1921. Its population had fallen to 74 in 1956, and was down to 13 by 1991 (out of a subdivisional remainder of 20), to 8 in 1996 (the entire 'between communities' population), and to 5 by 2001 (again, the entire remainder population of the subdivision (2G)). The population then rose, however, by the 2006 census to 10 (again, the remainder population). The same figure of 10 was reported in 2011, and again in 2016, and rose again in the 2021 census to 25 (remainder population). The local post office was closed on September 13, 1966.

== 1929 Tsunami ==
Taylor’s Bay was one of the forty small communities directly affected by the 1929 Grand Banks earthquake and tsunami, which destroyed many buildings, fishing stages and flakes, stores, boats, and other structures; only five of the community’s seventeen houses remained standing. The home of Jacob and Julia Bonnell was swept across the road by the giant wave. He was later quoted "If that's where God wanted it that's where it will stay.” The house remains on that site to this day.

The community is believed to have been the point of maximum wave height/amplitude of the tsunami, with the wave cresting at nearly 25 feet above sea level, reaching run-up heights of up to 45 feet.

Taylor’s Bay was one of six communities to suffer deaths in the disaster. Five lives were lost in November 1929, four of them children under 4 years of age. A sixth death is recorded in 1933, that of 7 year old Amelia Alice Bonnell, attributed to the lasting impacts of the tsunami on her health.

A relief committee was established by the Newfoundland government soon after the disaster, which provided food as well as lumber and other building supplies to reconstruct and build new houses.

== See also ==
- List of communities in Newfoundland and Labrador
- List of ghost towns in Newfoundland and Labrador
