= Green Island (Fortune), Newfoundland and Labrador =

Canadian rocky island

Location of Green Island between Newfoundland and Saint Pierre and Miquelon

Green Island (in French: île Verte) is a rocky island near the mouth of Fortune Bay, Newfoundland. It is located about 10 km (6 mi) west of the Burin Peninsula of Newfoundland near Point May, and 10 km (6 mi) east of Saint Pierre Island in the French overseas collectivity of Saint Pierre and Miquelon.

== Sovereignty ==
In Article XIII of the Treaty of Utrecht (1713), France acknowledged British ownership of and sovereignty over Newfoundland and its adjacent islands, of which Green Island is one.

The Saint Pierre and Miquelon islands were ceded back to France by the 1763 Treaty of Paris and the British and French signatories of the 1783 Treaty of Versailles made it clear that the mid channel line between Newfoundland and Saint Pierre and Miquelon was to be the boundary line.

Although the territorial location of the island remained legally unclear for a long time because it is nearer to Saint Pierre island than to Newfoundland but at the same time nearer to Newfoundland than to Little Miquelon, it eventually was assumed to be part of Newfoundland after the British lighthouse had been built on it (1908). The March 27, 1972, agreement between Canada and France on their mutual fishing relations determined the demarcation of the limit of their territorial waters. This agreement confirmed Green Island's location on the Canadian side of the boundary line. The boundary touches two Canadian islands at their low water marks (which are defined as the minimum low tide mark).

A U.S. State Department document lists nine turning points on the boundary. Points (4) and (5) touch islands:

The Annex to the Agreement specified that,

The line which determines the limit of the territorial waters of Canada and the zones submitted to the fishery jurisdiction of France extends northward and westward in a series of eight connected straight lines joining the following points: ...

Point (4) The low water mark on the south westernmost point on Enfant Perdu (Canada). Latitude 46°51'20"N., Longitude 56°05'30"W. approximately.

Point (5) The low water mark on the west point of the south-westernmost island of the Little Green Island group. Latitude 46°51'36"N., Longitude 56°05'58"W. approximately.

Point 4 and 5 are separated by a distance of 0.35 nautical miles, with the line from Point 4 toward Point 5 running in a northwesterly direction.

== Green Island Lighthouse ==
Green Island Lighthouse
- Location: Green Island (Fortune), Burin Peninsula, Newfoundland and Labrador, Canada
- Coordinates: 46°52′48″N 56°05′07″W

Tower
- Constructed: 1908 (first); 1955 (second)
- Construction: cast iron tower (first) skeletal tower (second and current)
- Height: 6.7 m (22 ft)
- Shape: cylindrical tower with balcony and lantern (first) square frustum tower (second and current)
- Markings: red tower (first) red lantern (current)
- Operator: Canadian Coast Guard

Light
- First lit: 1993 (current)
- Focal height: 45.4 m (149 ft)
- Range: 15 nmi (28 km; 17 mi)
- Characteristic: Fl W 10s

The first lighthouse was built on Green Island in 1908. It was replaced in 1955 with an aluminium skeletal tower, and this was replaced with the present structure in 1993. Its light flashes every 10 seconds and is visible for 16 nmi (30 km). The foghorn sounds every 60 seconds.

== See also ==
- Canada–France Maritime Boundary Case
- List of lighthouses in Canada
- List of lighthouses in Newfoundland and Labrador

== Gallery ==
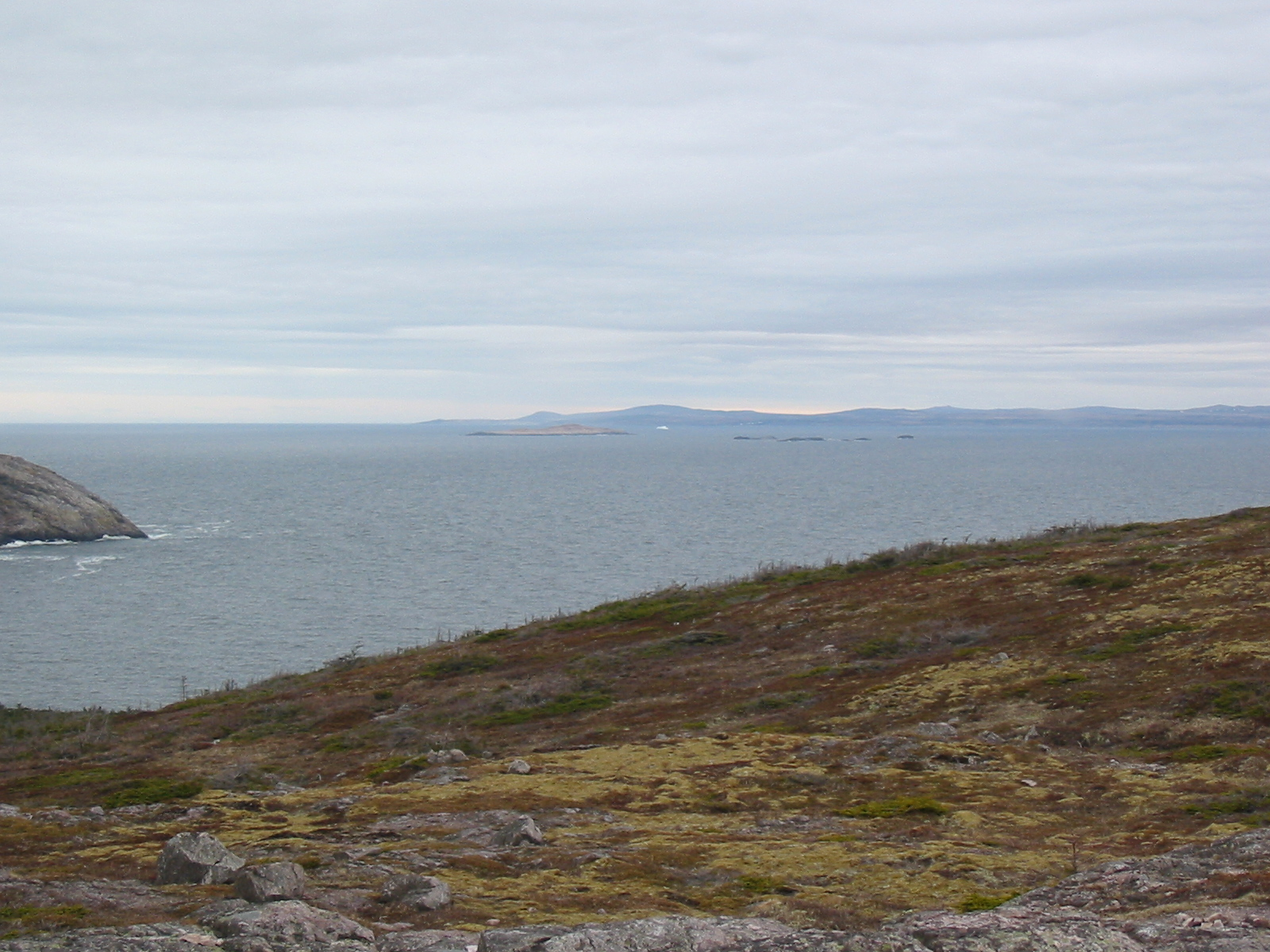
Green Island(s) from Saint Pierre island (France). Iceberg and Newfoundland in background.

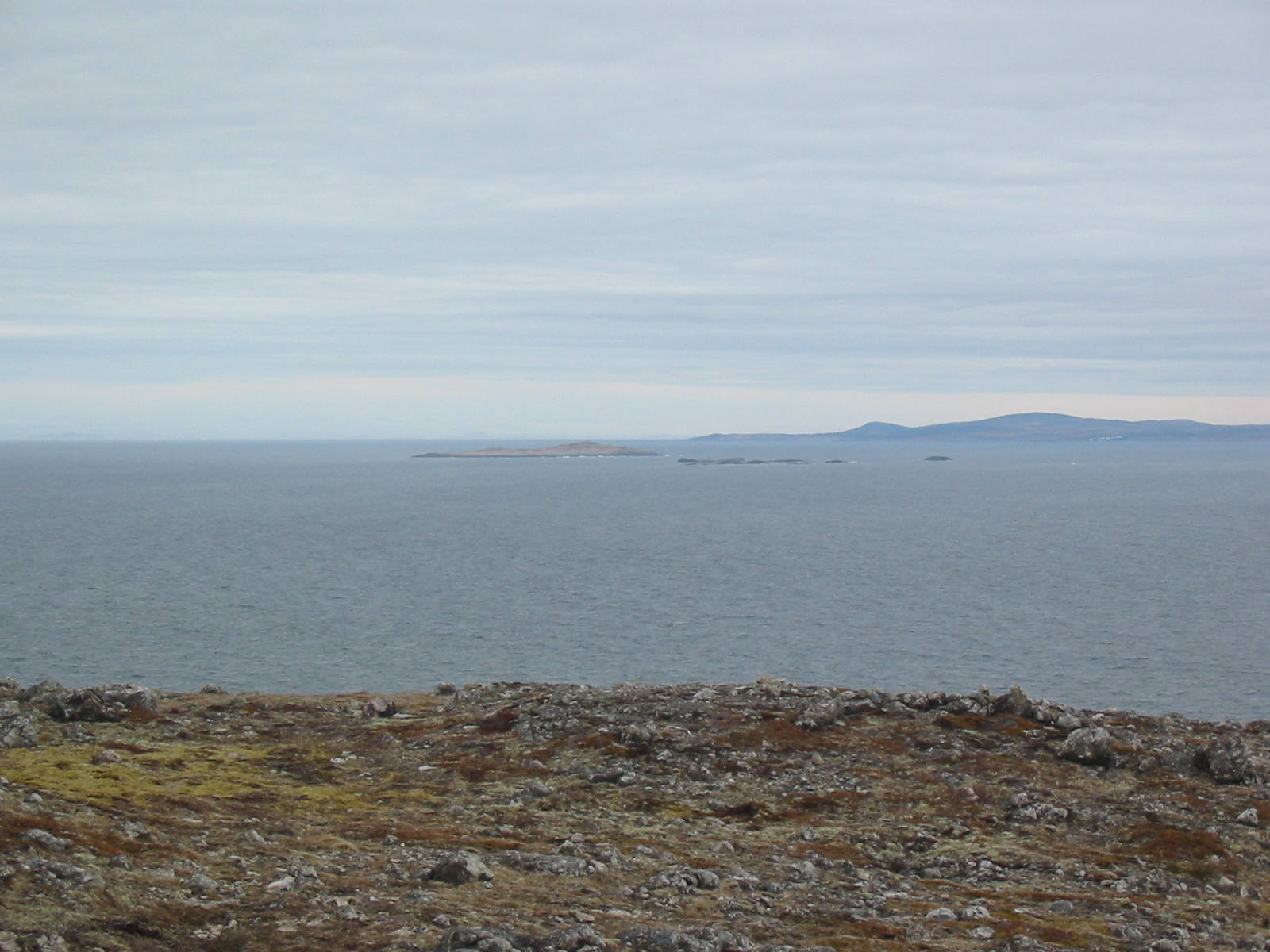
Another shot of Green Island from the north of Saint Pierre island.
