= Beau Bois =

Human settlement in Canada

Coordinates: 47°08′N 55°06′W

Beau Bois is a local service district and designated place in the Canadian province of Newfoundland and Labrador near Burin. It is 40 miles (64 km) from Placentia and 190 miles (310 km) from St. John's. The existence of Beau Bois can be documented at least as early as 1841 and probably existed for decades before. In 1844 widow Ann Farrell petitioned the Supreme Court of Newfoundland for redress of damages done to her by William Ryan and James Shock who went to her meadow at nearby Moorings Cove, Mortier Bay and stole her hay. She had been widowed in 1841 when her husband and sons drowned on a trip getting winter supplies from St. John's. Her cattle, hay, gardens and meadowland were her sole means of support. It is now a suburb of Marystown.

== History ==
Beau Bois was around since 1864. The Way office was established in 1879 and the first Waymaster was George Dober. It had a population of 68 in 1911 and 58 in 1956. There was one store and one hotel in 1911.

== Geography ==
Beau Bois is in Newfoundland within Subdivision D of Division No. 2.

== Demographics ==
As a designated place in the 2016 Census of Population conducted by Statistics Canada, Beau Bois recorded a population of 41 living in 20 of its 23 total private dwellings, a change of -25.5% from its 2011 population of 55. With a land area of 1.05 km^{2} (0.41 sq mi), it had a population density of 39.0/km^{2} (101.1/sq mi) in 2016.

== Government ==
Beau Bois is a local service district (LSD) that is governed by a committee responsible for the provision of certain services to the community. The chair of the LSD committee is Marylou Antle.

== See also ==
- List of communities in Newfoundland and Labrador
- List of designated places in Newfoundland and Labrador
- List of local service districts in Newfoundland and Labrador
