= Roundabout, Newfoundland and Labrador =

Settlement in Newfoundland and Labrador, Canada

Roundabout
- Ghost town
- Location within Newfoundland
- Coordinates: 46°55′00″N 55°34′57″W
- Country: Canada
- Province: Newfoundland and Labrador
- Area code: 709

Roundabout was a small settlement located west of St. Lawrence near Lawn.

== See also ==
- List of communities in Newfoundland and Labrador
