= Laurentian Slope seismic zone =

Seismically active area in Atlantic Canada

The Laurentian Slope Seismic Zone is a seismically active area in Atlantic Canada located on the Grand Banks of Newfoundland. It was the epicenter of the 7.2 magnitude 1929 Grand Banks earthquake.
