= Wandsworth, Newfoundland and Labrador =

Former settlement in Newfoundland and Labrador, Canada

Coordinates: 47°01′08″N 55°11′56″W

Wandsworth, Newfoundland and Labrador was a settlement located southwest of Burin. It had a population of 91 in 1956.

== See also ==
- List of communities in Newfoundland and Labrador
