= Point Enragée, Newfoundland and Labrador =

Community in Newfoundland and Labrador, Canada

Coordinates: 47°23′00″N 55°17′00″W

Point Rosie, also known as Point Enragée, is located northwest of Marystown, Newfoundland and Labrador. All residents were resettled to Garnish, Grand Bank and other Fortune Bay outports during the 1960s. The settlement is still inhabited seasonally and is connected to other settlements, mainly Garnish, by an active ATV trail. It never had a road or rail link, and sometimes the Fortune Bay Northeasters made leaving the community and getting ashore very risky to life and limb. An Anglican Church from the community was moved to Frenchman's Cove in 1973, after their church was destroyed by a fire. It had a population of 168 in 1956.

== See also ==
- List of communities in Newfoundland and Labrador
