= Allan's Island, Newfoundland and Labrador =

Allan's Island Allan Island
- Unincorporated community
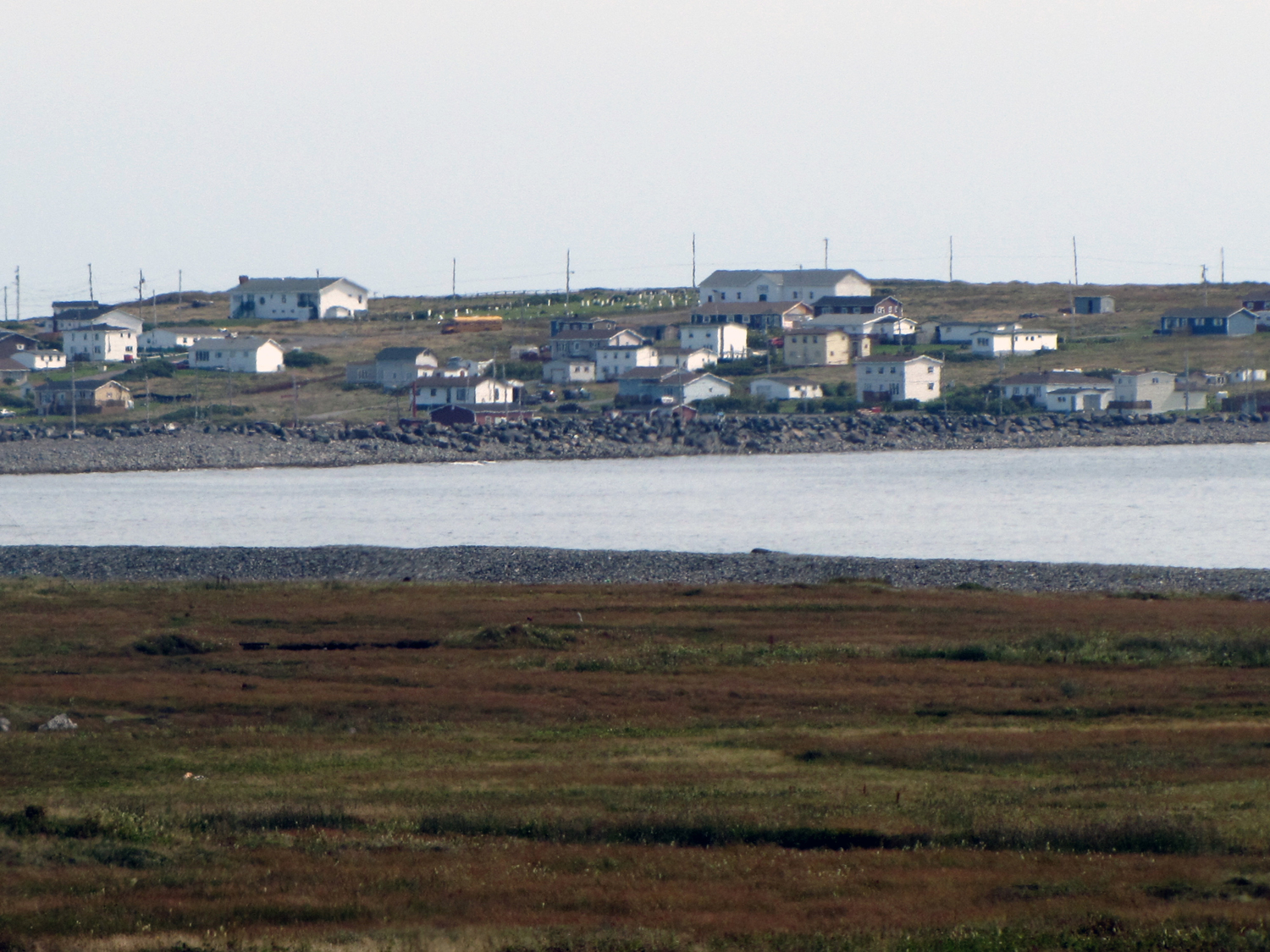

- Location of Allan's Island in Newfoundland
- Coordinates: 46°51′2.8″N 55°48′9.7″W
- Country: Canada
- Province: Newfoundland and Labrador
- Settled: 1968

Population (1956)
  - Total: 187
- Time zone: UTC-3:30 (Newfoundland Time)
  - Summer (DST): UTC-2:30 (Newfoundland Daylight)
- Area code: 709
- Highways: Route 220

Allan's Island, formerly Allan Island, is a Canadian fishing settlement in the Burin peninsula of the province of Newfoundland and Labrador. It is a part of the town of Lamaline.

In 1968 it was designated a village. It has a lighthouse which is visible for 9 miles. The lighthouse was first lit in 1879, and the current tower was erected around 2004. In 1940 the population was 303, in 1951 it was 196 and down to 187 by 1956. It is now part of the town of Lamaline. The settlement is connected to Lamaline via a causeway supported by breakwaters.

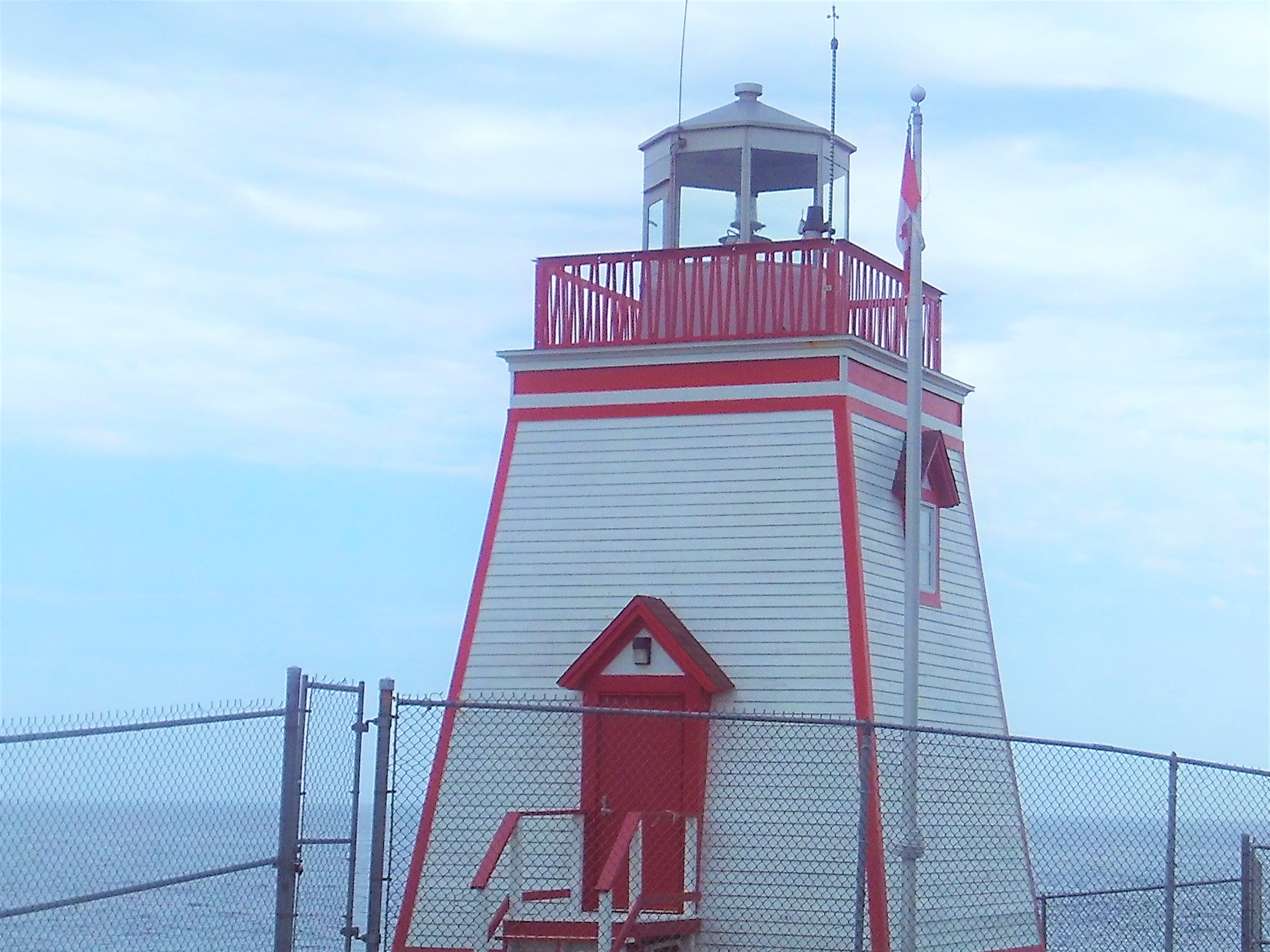
Allan's Island Lighthouse

== WWII ==
- A small United States Military radar station (Cinco) set up on top of "The Hill" during the Second World War.
- Many men from the Island volunteered to join the British Royal Navy and Armed Forces during the Second World War.

== See also ==
- List of communities in Newfoundland and Labrador
