= Point May =

- Town
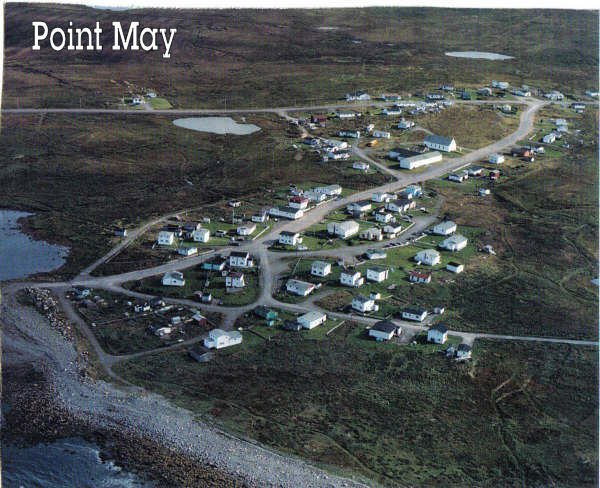

- Location of Point May in Newfoundland
- Coordinates: 46°54′1.15″N 55°55′40.05″W
- Country: Canada
- Province: Newfoundland and Labrador

Population (2021)
  - Total: 254
- Time zone: UTC-3:30 (Newfoundland Time)
  - Summer (DST): UTC-2:30 (Newfoundland Daylight)
- Area code: 709
- Highways: Route 220

Point May is the most southerly community on the Burin Peninsula in Newfoundland and Labrador with a population of 254 in 2021. It is a Catholic community with a church, town hall, fire hall, softball and soccer field. It is known for its close proximity, 19 km (12 mi), to the French islands of St. Pierre and Miquelon, where the smuggling of liquor and tobacco has been a way of life since before Canada was a country. The tiny Canadian Green Island lies 10 km (6 mi) west of Point May, roughly halfway to St. Pierre.

== Demographics ==
In the 2021 Census of Population conducted by Statistics Canada, Point May had a population of 254 living in 123 of its 134 total private dwellings, a change of 10% from its 2016 population of 231. With a land area of 63.25 km^{2} (24.42 sq mi), it had a population density of 4.0/km^{2} (10.4/sq mi) in 2021.

== See also ==
- Lamaline
- Newfoundland outport
