= USS Truxtun (DD-229) =

Clemson-class destroyer

Coordinates: 46°52′36.4″N 55°26′13.5″W

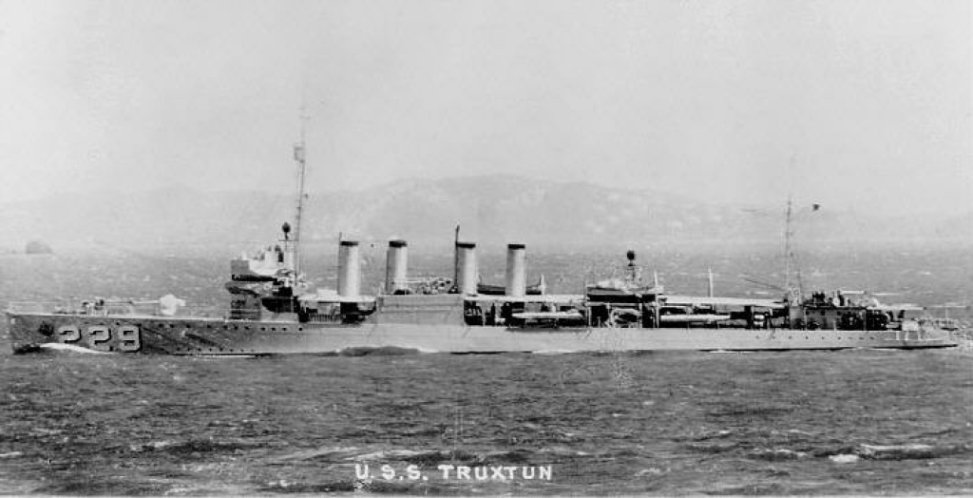
- USS Truxtun in the 1930s.

History

United States
- Name: Truxtun
- Namesake: Thomas Truxtun
- Builder: William Cramp & Sons, Philadelphia
- Yard number: 495
- Laid down: 11 November 1919
- Launched: 28 September 1920
- Commissioned: 30 December 1920
- Stricken: 25 March 1942
- Fate: Ran aground and sank, 18 February 1942

General characteristics
- Class & type: Clemson-class destroyer
- Displacement: 1,215 tons
- Length: 314 ft 4 1/2 in (95.82 m)
- Beam: 30 ft 11 1/2 in (9.436 m)
- Draft: 9 ft 9 3/4 in (2.991 m)
- Propulsion: 26,500 shp (19,800 kW); Geared turbines; 2 screws
- Speed: 35 knots (65 km/h)
- Complement: 122 officers and enlisted
- Armament: 4 x 4 in (100 mm) guns; 1 x 3 in (76 mm) gun; 12 x 21-inch (533 mm) torpedo tubes

USS Truxtun (DD-229) was a Clemson-class destroyer in the United States Navy during World War II. She was the third ship named for Thomas Truxtun.

== Construction and commissioning ==
Truxtun was laid down on 3 December 1919 and launched on 28 September 1920 from William Cramp & Sons. The ship was sponsored by Miss Isabelle Truxtun Brumby. The destroyer was commissioned at the Philadelphia Navy Yard on 16 February 1921.

== Service history ==
Upon commissioning, Truxtun completed shakedown and began duty along the east coast with the Atlantic Fleet as a unit of Division 39, Destroyer Squadron 3. She operated with that unit along the Atlantic seaboard until the fall when she was reassigned to Division 43, Squadron 15. During the winter of 1921 and 1922, the destroyer joined the fleet in maneuvers and exercises near Guantanamo Bay, Cuba.

=== Asiatic Fleet ===
In March 1922, Division 43 returned north to Newport, Rhode Island, to prepare for service in the Asiatic Fleet. On 22 June 1922, Truxtun departed Newport and proceeded, via the Mediterranean, the Suez Canal, and the Indian Ocean, to the Far East which she reached in mid-August. By early September, she and several sister destroyers of Division 43 joined the main elements of the Asiatic Fleet off Chefoo on the northern coast of China. Late in October, the fleet headed south to its winter base at Manila in the Philippines, from whence it conducted exercises until the following spring.

Truxtun served with the Asiatic Fleet for the next 10 years. During that decade, she alternated summer cruises in Chinese waters with winter maneuvers in the Philippines. This routine was punctuated by special unusual assignments. For instance, in June 1924, she and the other five destroyers of Division 43 helped to form a chain of picket ships across the Yellow Sea for the Army's global flight. More often, however, internecine warfare in China brought Truxtun to the coast of that troubled nation to protect American lives and property. She spent a total of eight out of the 13 months between September 1926 and October 1927 patrolling the Yangtze River while competing factions in China fought one another - and occasionally otherwise neutral third parties. The destroyer returned to the Yangtze River Patrol twice more - from 1 March to 14 April 1930 and from January through March 1932 - when internal political convulsions in China threatened foreign lives and property.

On 18 April 1932, Truxtun departed Manila and the Asiatic Fleet to join the destroyers attached to the Battle Force. After stops at Guam, Midway, and Hawaii, she reached Mare Island Navy Yard on 13 May. For the next seven years, she patrolled the Pacific, as far north as Alaska and as far south as the Panama Canal, participating in maneuvers with capital ships of the Battle Force. Only once, in 1934, did she leave the Pacific. On 9 April, she cleared San Diego and transited the Panama Canal. After calling at Port-au-Prince, Haiti, Truxtun steamed north to New York City, arriving on 31 May. Following that visit, she patrolled the eastern seaboard. On 15 September, the destroyer stood out of Hampton Roads, retransited the canal, and returned to San Diego on 9 November to resume operations with the Battle Force.

=== World War II ===
==== Transfer to Atlantic Squadron ====
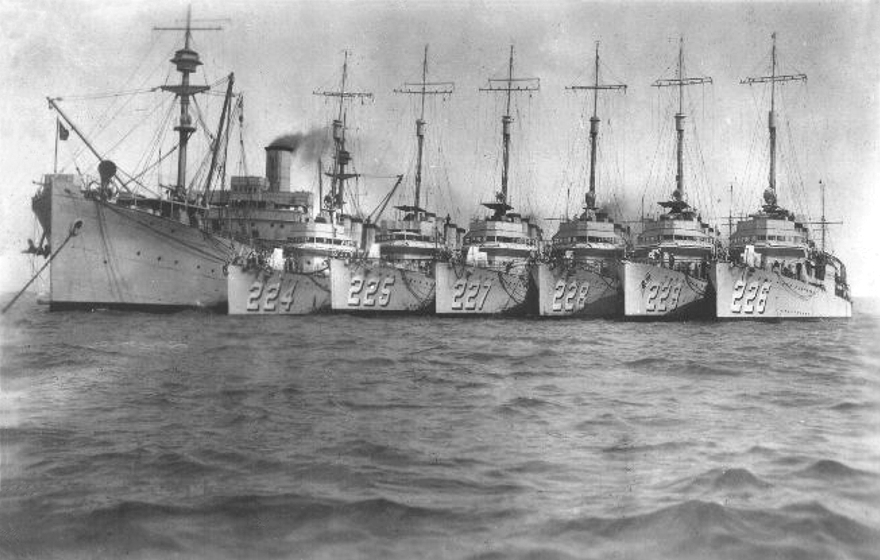
Left to right: Destroyer tender Whitney and destroyers Stewart, Pope, Pillsbury, John D. Ford, Truxtun, and Peary

On 27 April 1939, Truxtun steamed out of San Diego and headed for the canal once more. She reached Norfolk, Virginia on 15 May and joined Destroyer Division 27, Atlantic Squadron. The destroyer patrolled the east coast of the United States while war clouds gathered in Europe. Soon after the outbreak of war in September, Truxtun began enforcing the provisions of President Franklin D. Roosevelt's proclamation of American neutrality by conducting neutrality patrols and escort duty off the Atlantic coast, in the Gulf of Mexico, and in the Caribbean. In late May and early June 1940, the warship made a voyage to Casablanca in French North Africa and then resumed neutrality patrols off Florida and in the Caribbean.

Following repairs at Norfolk in December 1940 and January 1941, Truxtun cleared Hampton Roads on 6 February. The next day, she reached Newport, Rhode Island, where she joined Destroyer Division 63, Squadron 31. Between late February and mid-March, she made two voyages to Halifax, Nova Scotia, returning to the United States at the Washington Navy Yard on both occasions. On 15 March, the destroyer returned to Newport and resumed patrols and exercises. For the remainder of her career, Truxtun patrolled the North Atlantic sea lanes and escorted convoys from New England and Canadian ports – via NS Argentia, Newfoundland – to Reykjavík, Iceland.

== Fate ==
On Christmas Day 1941, Truxtun departed Boston, Massachusetts in the screen of Convoy HX 168. She arrived at Reykjavík on 13 January 1942 and, six days later, headed back to Argentia with Convoy ON 57. At 0410 on 18 February while acting as escort to USS Pollux in Placentia Bay, Newfoundland, Truxtun ran aground "in a howling gale" between the outport communities of Lawn and St. Lawrence, near Chambers Cove. Under extremely violent and freezing sea conditions she broke up almost immediately after grounding and, in spite of the heroic efforts of the local populace, lost 110 members of her crew to the elements. Pollux was also wrecked with 93 fatalities, and USS Wilkes also grounded, but made way with no fatalities.

Robert Chafe's play, Oil and Water, depicts the story of Lanier Phillips, the sole African American survivor of the sinking of Truxtun.

Truxtun's name was struck from the Navy list on 25 March 1942.

Torpedoman's Mate First Class Henry Breault, a Medal of Honor recipient, was assigned to Truxtun from September 1939 to September 1940.

== Convoys escorted ==
Convoy	Escort Group	Dates	Notes
HX 155		18-25 Oct 1941	from Newfoundland to Iceland prior to US declaration of war
ON 31		4-15 Nov 1941	from Iceland to Newfoundland prior to US declaration of war
HX 168		4-10 Jan 1942	from Newfoundland to Iceland
ON 57		24 Jan-7 Feb 1942	from Iceland to Newfoundland

== Awards ==
- Yangtze Service Medal
- American Campaign Medal
- European-African-Middle Eastern Campaign Medal
- World War II Victory Medal
