= Paul Pike =

Canadian politician

The Honourable Paul Pike ECNL MHA

Minister Responsible for the Newfoundland and Labrador Housing corporation
- In office June 14, 2023 – February 29, 2024
- Preceded by: John Abbott
- Succeeded by: Fred Hutton

Minister of Municipal Affairs and Community Engagement
- In office May 9, 2025 – October 29, 2025
- Preceded by: John Haggie
- Succeeded by: Chris Tibbs

Minister of Children, Seniors and Social Development
- In office June 14, 2023 – May 9, 2025
- Preceded by: John Abbott
- Succeeded by: position abolished

Member of the Newfoundland and Labrador House of Assembly for Burin-Grand Bank
- Incumbent
- Assumed office March 27, 2021
- Preceded by: Carol Anne Haley

Personal details
- Born: August 7, 1956 (age 70)
- Party: Liberal
- Occupation: Teacher

Paul A. Pike (born August 7, 1956) is a Canadian politician, who was elected to the Newfoundland and Labrador House of Assembly in the 2021 provincial election. He represents the electoral district of Burin-Grand Bank as a member of the Liberal Party of Newfoundland and Labrador. On June 14, 2023, he was appointed Minister of Children, Seniors and Social Development. On May 9, 2025, he was appointed Minister of Municipal Affairs and Community Engagement Registrar General.

Prior to entering provincial politics, Pike was a teacher and the mayor of St. Lawrence.

Pike was re-elected in the 2025 Newfoundland and Labrador general election.

== Election results ==
2025 Newfoundland and Labrador general election: Burin-Grand Bank
Party	Candidate	Votes	%	±%
Liberal	Paul Pike	2,437	49.1%	-10.49
Progressive Conservative	Jamie Engram	2,384	48.0%	+11.37
New Democratic	Tori Locke	141	2.8%	-0.98
Total valid votes				
Total rejected ballots				
Turnout				
Eligible voters				
Liberal hold		Swing		-

2021 Newfoundland and Labrador general election: Burin-Grand Bank
Party	Candidate	Votes	%	±%
Liberal	Paul Pike	2,666	59.59	+7.97
Progressive Conservative	Fred Dodge	1,639	36.63	-11.75
New Democratic	Alvin Banfield	169	3.78	
Total valid votes		4,474		
Total rejected ballots				
Turnout				
Eligible voters				
Liberal hold		Swing		+9.86
Source(s) "Officially Nominated Candidates General Election 2021" (PDF). Elections Newfoundland and Labrador. "NL Election 2021 (Unofficial Results)".
