= Davis Cove =

Human settlement in Newfoundland and Labrador, Canada

- Former settlement
- Location in Newfoundland and Labrador
- Coordinates: 47°38′09″N 54°20′39″W
- Country: Canada
- Province: Newfoundland and Labrador
- Region: Placentia

Population
  - Total: 182 (1,956)

Davis Cove was a small settlement in the Placentia district of Newfoundland, Canada. It was served by the C.N.R. Express circa 1953. It became a Post Office town in 1949 and was still active in the late 1960s. It had a population of 182 in 1956. At present it is a mix of separated dwellings.

== See also ==
- List of communities in Newfoundland and Labrador
