= Corbin, Burin Peninsula, Newfoundland and Labrador =

Settlement in Newfoundland and Labrador, Canada

Coordinates: 46.960°N 55.241°W

Location of Corbin in Newfoundland and Labrador

Corbin is a settlement in Newfoundland and Labrador. In 1817, travelling Methodist Minister John Lewis recorded a population of 7 Protestants and 61 Catholics in the town of "Corban." It was one of the last communities in Newfoundland to be resettled, having returned a population figure in 1981 but not thereafter. A number of cabins remain however, and these are still seasonally visited. The bridge to Corbin was earmarked for dismantlement, meaning cabin owners may find some local difficulty in reaching their summer homes.
