= Lewin's Cove =

- Town
- Interactive map of Lewin's Cove
- Coordinates: 47°5′17″N 55°13′2″W
- Country: Canada
- Province: Newfoundland and Labrador

Population (2021)
  - Total: 546
- Time zone: UTC-3:30 (Newfoundland Time)
  - Summer (DST): UTC-2:30 (Newfoundland Daylight)
- Area code: 709
- Highways: Route 220

Lewin's Cove is a town in the Canadian province of Newfoundland and Labrador. The town had a population of 546 in the Canada 2021 Census.

Lewin's Cove is located just outside the Burin town limits. Burin provides Lewin's Cove water supply and fire services.

== Demographics ==
In the 2021 Census of Population conducted by Statistics Canada, Lewin's Cove had a population of 546 living in 241 of its 261 total private dwellings, a change of 0.4% from its 2016 population of 544. With a land area of 6.33 km^{2} (2.44 sq mi), it had a population density of 86.3/km^{2} (223.4/sq mi) in 2021.

== See also ==
- Burin Peninsula
- List of cities and towns in Newfoundland and Labrador
