= 1929 Grand Banks earthquake =

Earthquake and tsunami in eastern Canada

- Location within Canada
- UTC time: 1929-11-18 20:32:00
- ISC event: 908394
- USGS-ANSS: ComCat
- Local date: November 18, 1929
- Local time: 17:02
- Magnitude: 7.2 M_{w}
- Depth: 20 km (12 mi)
- Epicenter: 44.54°N 56.01°W
- Areas affected: Dominion of Newfoundland; Canada; French Republic Saint Pierre and Miquelon
- Total damage: $400,000 (equivalent to $7,500,000 in 2025)
- Max. intensity: RFS VI (Strong tremor); MMI VIII (Severe)
- Tsunami: Yes
- Aftershocks: ~3
- Casualties: 27 or 28 killed

The 1929 Grand Banks earthquake (also called the Laurentian Slope earthquake and the South Shore Disaster) occurred on November 18, 1929. The shock had a moment magnitude of 7.2 and a maximum Rossi–Forel intensity of VI (Strong tremor) and was centered in the Atlantic Ocean off the south coast of Newfoundland in the Laurentian Slope seismic zone.

== Earthquake ==
The earthquake was centred on the edge of the Grand Banks of Newfoundland, about 400 kilometres (250 mi) south of the island. It was felt as far away as New York City and Montreal. The quake, which occurred along two faults 250 kilometres (160 mi) south of the Burin Peninsula, triggered a large submarine landslide displacing 200 km^{3} or 48 cu mi of ground. It snapped 12 submarine transatlantic telegraph cables and led to a tsunami that arrived in three waves. Newfoundland, Canada and Saint Pierre and Miquelon had the largest impact, both from the snapped 12 submarine cables, and the tsunami. This was Canada's largest submarine landslide ever recorded, up to 500 times the size of 1894 Saint-Alban subaerial slide.

In 2002 Natural Resources Canada and the United States Geological Survey created an intensity map by using the Revised Modified Mercalli scale.

== Tsunami ==
The tsunami waves had an amplitude of 3–8 metres (9.8–26.2 ft), and a runup of 13 metres (43 ft) along the Burin Peninsula. It destroyed many south coastal communities on the Peninsula, killing 27 or 28 people and leaving 1,000 or more homeless. All means of communication were cut off by the destruction, and relief efforts were further hampered by a blizzard that struck the day after. It was recorded as far away as Lagos, Portugal 4,060 km (2,520 mi) away, 06:47 after the earthquake. It took 2 hours and 23 minutes to strike Burin, Newfoundland, 340 km (210 mi) from the epicentre, and only two hours to be observed in Bermuda 1,445 km (898 mi).

Tsunami travel times demonstrate the strong anisotropy of the propagating waves. The waves reach open ocean islands such as Bermuda in about 2 h[hours] (mean speed ~700 km/h) and the Azores in about 4 h (~630 km/h). At the same time, tsunami wave speeds are much slower in the direction of the North America[n] coast: they require 2.7 h to reach Halifax (~230 km/h) and 4.2 h to reach Atlantic City (~380 km/h).

— W.H Berninghausen,

=== Prince Edward Island ===
Prince Edward Island felt the earthquake; at the time the intensity was rated at IV (Slight tremor) – VI (Strong tremor) on the Rossi-Forel scale. In the province, it ranged from an intensity of III (Weak) – V (Moderate).

=== Saint Pierre and Miquelon ===
In the French Overseas territory of Saint Pierre and Miquelon, about 18 kilometres (11 mi) west of the Burin Peninsula, residents were startled around 16:30h by an earthquake lasting approximately one minute. At 17:20, the subsequent tsunami reached the island of Saint-Pierre, submerging the docks. The most destruction was reported on the island formerly known as Île-aux-Chiens (The Island of the Dogs, until 1931–now known as L'Île-aux-Marins, The Island of the Sailors); the tsunami approached from the south, rising above the height of the south bank that protects the south coast, and flooding the lower part of the island upon impact. The waves destroyed (and moved) several residences and structures, but there were no reported injuries or casualties from the islands. The quake's intensity on the island was V (Moderate tremor) – VI (Strong tremor), and on the revised Modified Mercalli Intensity scale IV (Light) – V (Moderate).

== Aftermath ==
In the immediate aftermath of the tsunami, electricity, radio and telegram communications were unavailable for several days. It took three days for the S.S. Meigle to respond to a distress signal, sending supplies, aid workers, doctors, nurses, blankets, and food. Donations from across Newfoundland, the United States and the United Kingdom totaled around $250k (about CA$4.3 million in 2023). There was never an accurate or official list of victims produced, by any individual or branch of the Newfoundland, French or British governments. In a report entitled "Loss of Life", the Dr. Harris Munden Mosdell (chairman of the board of Health Burin West) reported that "The loss of life through the tidal wave totals twenty-seven. Twenty-five deaths were due directly to the upheaval. Two other deaths occurred subsequently and were due to shock and exposure." Later research attributed an additional death to the earthquake.

In 1952, scientists from Columbia University put together the pieces of the sequentially-broken cables, leading to the discovery of the landslide and the first documentation of a turbidity current. Scientists have examined layers of sand, believed to be deposited by other tsunamis, in an effort to determine the regional frequency of large earthquakes. One sand layer, thought to be deposited by the 1929 tsunami at Taylor's Bay, was found 13 centimetres (5.1 in) below the turf line. The frequency of large tsunamis varies according to the deposition of sediments offshore, as it was the submarine landslide's power that triggered the wave.

== See also ==
- List of earthquakes in 1929
- List of earthquakes in Canada
- List of tsunamis
