= Lord's Cove =

- Town
- Location of Lord's Cove in Newfoundland
- Coordinates: 46°52′55″N 55°40′25″W
- Country: Canada
- Province: Newfoundland and Labrador

Area
  - Land: 30.92 km^{2} (11.94 sq mi)
- Elevation: 29 m (95 ft)

Population (2021)
  - Total: 155
  - Density: 5.2/km^{2} (13/sq mi)
- Time zone: UTC-3:30 (Newfoundland Time)
  - Summer (DST): UTC-2:30 (Newfoundland Daylight)
- Postal code span: A0E
- Area code: 709
- Highways: Route 220

Lord's Cove is a town in the Canadian province of Newfoundland and Labrador. The town had a population of 155 in the Canada 2021 Census. Lord's Cove has an inshore fishing history. The town is approximately 65 km southeast of Marystown.

On November 18, 1929, a tsunami, triggered by an offshore earthquake on the Grand Banks, killed Sarah Rennie and her three children, Bernard, Rita and Patrick, and destroyed the fishing property and provisions of most of Lord Cove's fishers.

Lord's Cove is a birdwatching area with established colonies of Leach's storm-petrel and Manx shearwater nearby at Middle Lawn Island. The colony of Manx shearwaters near "the Cove" is the only known North American colony of the burrowing seabird.

On July 20, 2009, the government of Newfoundland and Labrador announced the creation of the Lawn Islands Archipelago Provisional Ecological Reserve which consists of Middle Lawn Island, Offer Island and Columbier Islands. In addition to the large colonies of Manx shearwaters and Leach's storm petrels, the ecological reserve at Lawn Islands will protect a number of additional breeding seabird species, namely herring gulls, great black backed gulls, black guillemots, black-legged kittiwakes, common murres and Arctic terns.

Sandy Cove beach is located in Lord's Cove.

== Demographics ==
In the 2021 Census of Population conducted by Statistics Canada, Lord's Cove had a population of 155 living in 79 of its 113 total private dwellings, a change of −4.3% from its 2016 population of 162. With a land area of 29.91 km^{2} (11.55 sq mi), it had a population density of 5.2/km^{2} (13.4/sq mi) in 2021.

== See also ==
- Lamaline
- List of cities and towns in Newfoundland and Labrador
