= Epworth-Great Salmonier, Newfoundland and Labrador =

Human settlement in Canada

Coordinates: 47°02′55″N 55°13′12″W

Epworth-Great Salmonier is a local service district and designated place in the Canadian province of Newfoundland and Labrador. It is on the Burin Peninsula of the island of Newfoundland.

== Geography ==
Epworth-Great Salmonier is in Newfoundland within Subdivision E of Division No. 2.

== Demographics ==
As a designated place in the 2016 Census of Population conducted by Statistics Canada, Epworth-Great Salmonier recorded a population of 177 living in 73 of its 86 total private dwellings, a change of -16.1% from its 2011 population of 211. With a land area of 8.42 km^{2} (3.25 sq mi), it had a population density of 21.0/km^{2} (54.4/sq mi) in 2016.

== Government ==
Epworth-Great Salmonier is a local service district (LSD) that is governed by a committee responsible for the provision of certain services to the community. The chair of the LSD committee is Robert Mitchell.

== See also ==
- List of designated places in Newfoundland and Labrador
- List of local service districts in Newfoundland and Labrador
- Marystown
