= Grand Bank =

- Town
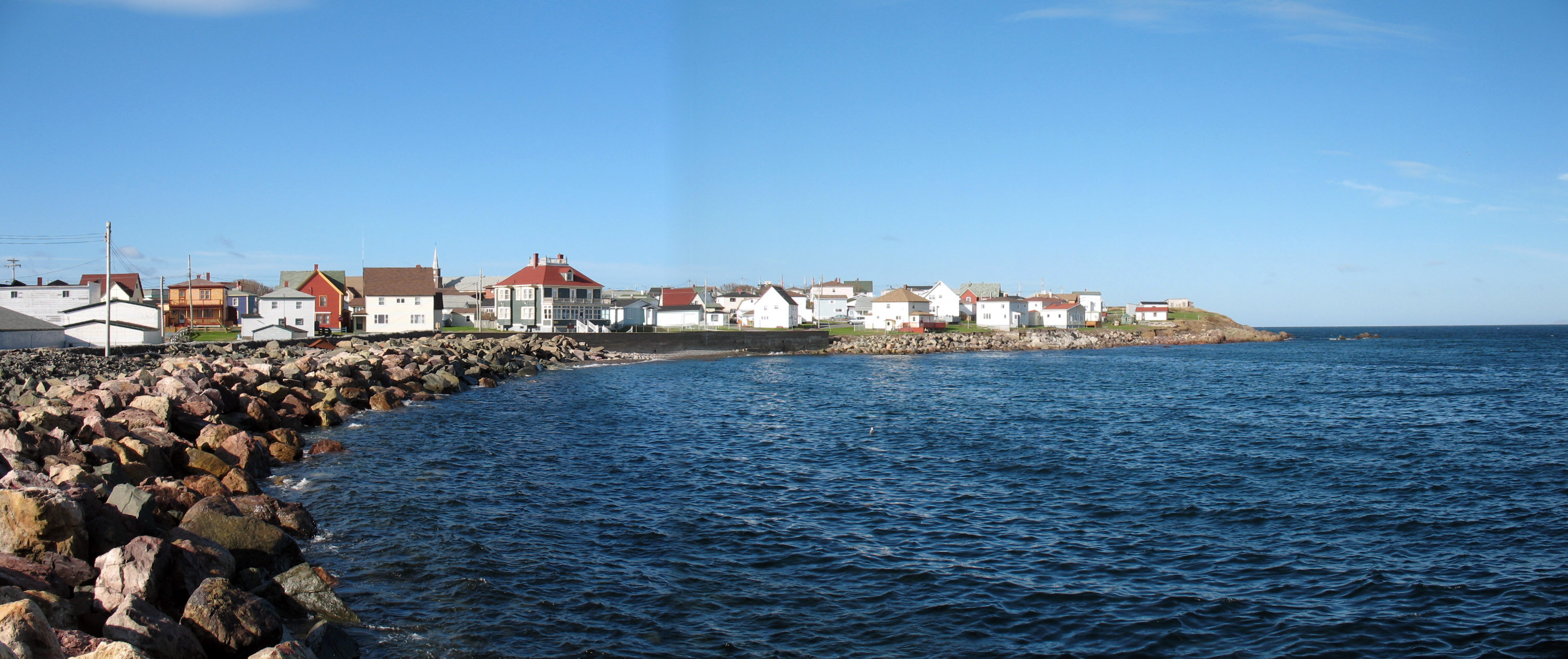

- Seal

- Location of Grand Bank in Newfoundland
- Coordinates: 47°06′N 55°47′W
- Country: Canada
- Province: Newfoundland and Labrador
- Settled: 1640
- Incorporated: 1943

Government
  - Type: Town Council
  - Mayor: Rex C. Matthews
  - MHA: Paul Pike, (LIB), Burin-Grand Bank
  - MP: Jonathan Rowe (CON), Terra Nova—The Peninsulas

Area
  - Total: 16.97 km^{2} (6.55 sq mi)
- Elevation: 7 m (23 ft)

Population (2021)
  - Total: 2,152
  - Density: 136.1/km^{2} (352/sq mi)
- Time zone: UTC-3:30 (Newfoundland Time)
  - Summer (DST): UTC-2:30 (Newfoundland Daylight)
- Postal codes: A0E
- Area code: 709
- Highways: Route 210; Route 220; The Heritage Run
- Website: The Town of Grand Bank
- Grand Bank Lighthouse
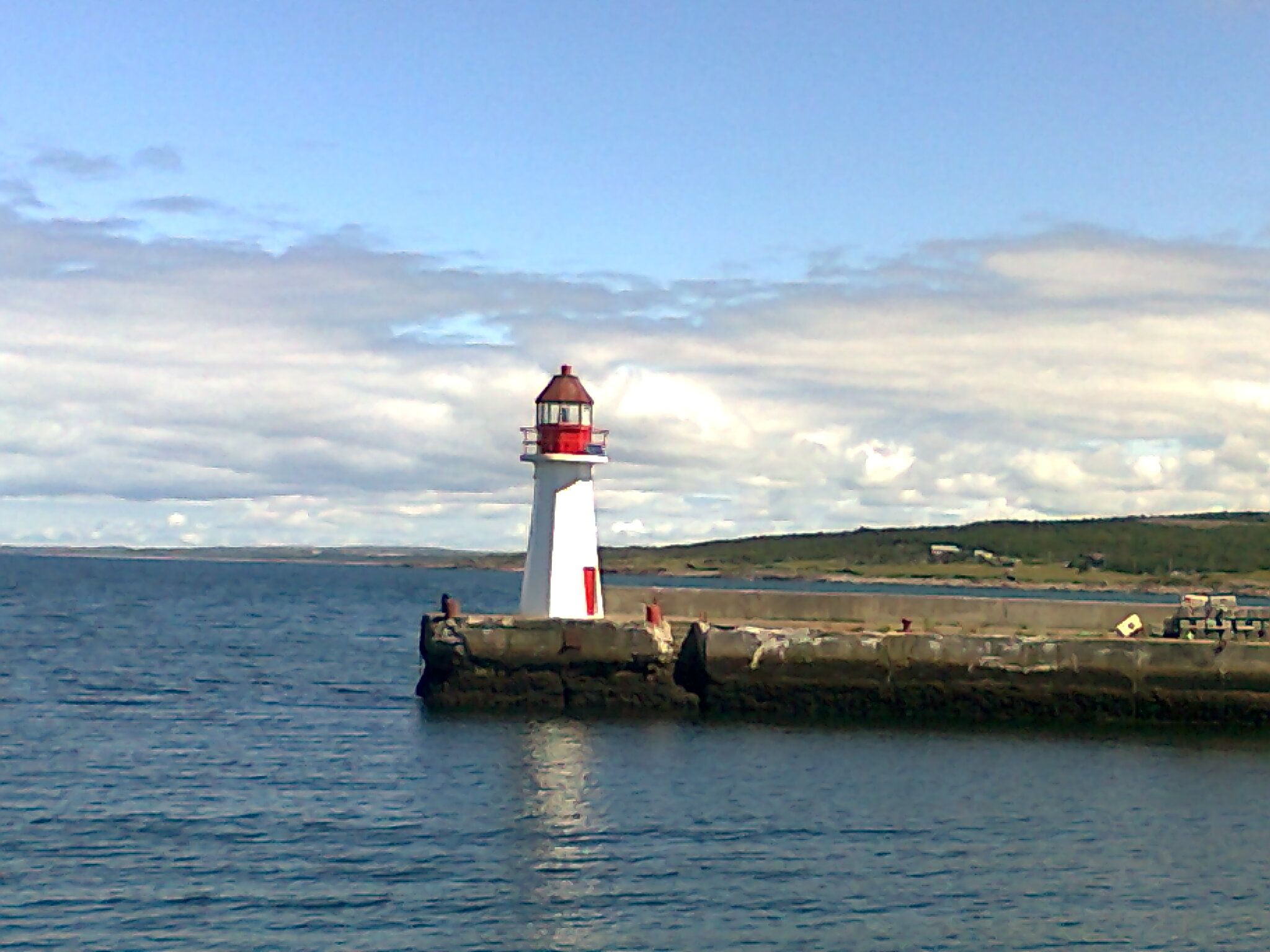
- Constructed: 1890 (first)
- Construction: wooden tower (first) concrete tower (current)
- Height: 7 m (23 ft)
- Shape: octagonal truncated tower with balcony and lantern (current)
- Markings: white tower, red lantern (current)
- Operator: Canadian Coast Guard
- First lit: 1922 (current)
- Focal height: 8 m (26 ft)
- Lens: eighth-order dioptric lens
- Range: 5 nmi (9.3 km; 5.8 mi)
- Characteristic: Q G

Grand Bank is a small rural town in the Canadian province of Newfoundland and Labrador with a population of 2,580. It is located on the southern tip or "toe" of the Burin Peninsula (also known as "the boot"), 360 km from the provincial capital of St. John's.

Grand Bank was inhabited by French fishermen as early as 1640 and began as a fishing settlement with about seven families. It was given the name "Grand Banc" by its original French inhabitants because of the high bank that extends from Admiral's Cove to the water's edge on the west side of the harbour.

The Town of Grand Bank can attribute much of its past and present growth and prosperity to its proximity to the fishing grounds and its ice-free harbour. Original settlers thrived on trade with the French and a vigorous inshore fishing industry. Grand Bank became the nucleus of the bank fishing industry for Newfoundland and a service centre for Fortune Bay. With the decline of the salt fish industry, the town's emphasis quickly shifted to fresh fish production. Enterprising businessmen and town planners prepared the way for a fresh fish plant (present day Grand Bank Seafoods Inc.) and a fleet of trawlers.

== Timeline ==
- 1640 – French fishermen were said to be in Grand Bank during this time.
- 1687 – First French Census taken in Newfoundland shows "Grand Banc" with a population of 45 (39 servants, 2 masters, 3 women and 1 child). The first community had one church, 3 houses and 18 muskets.
- 1693 – Census takers recorded some of the prominent names: Bourney, Commer, Chevallier and Grandin.
- 1713 – Treaty of Utrecht, France relinquishes its claim to Newfoundland including St. Pierre et Miquelon. The French Population moved to Ile Royale (Cape Breton).
- 1714 – William Taverner surveys the coast for the English Government.
- 1763 – Peace Treaty of Paris: French are given St. Pierre et Miquelon, forcing the English population at St. Pierre to relocate to Grand Bank and Fortune Bay. First record of English settlement.
- 1765 – Captain James Cook mapped out the area and moored his ship at Admiral's Cove. Came ashore and gathered buds off the small spruce tree to brew beer (excellent source of vitamin C) for his crew.
- 1836 – Census list 45 dwellings and a population of 236 residents.
- 1850s – By the end of the 1850s, Grand Bank had a school, a doctor, a judicial system, a postal service and a road system.
- 1870s – A change in fishing vessel from a shallop to a schooner. With the change in vessel came a change in fishing gear. The trawl was introduced. However, the trawl could not be set directly from the schooner. There was a need for a smaller boat, different from the punt; we have the first appearance of the dory.
- 1879 – Breakwater and Dredging legislation was passed.
- 1881 – Bank Fishery began and Samuel Harris’s first season on the banks was a success. In short order, a number of other Grand Bankers with schooners followed (some of which include George Abraham Buffett, Simeon N. Tibbo and Daniel Tibbo). The demand for schooners dramatically increased. There were at one point (1885 & 1886) seven schooners being built in Grand Bank.
- 1890–1940 – Grand Bank had a fleet of banking and foreign-going ships and earned the distinction "The Bank Fishing Capital" of Newfoundland.
- 1955 – Modern fresh fish processing plant was built in Grand Bank and the schooners were replaced with modern steel trawlers.

Today, Grand Bank is the home of a shell fishing industry, a modern plant owned by Grand Bank Seafoods (A division of Clearwater Seafoods). It is also home to Dynamic Air Shelters - Manufactures of specialized, inflatable industrial shelters for the oil and gas sector, as well as structures for promotional and ‘first response’ uses.

== Demographics ==
In the 2021 Census of Population conducted by Statistics Canada, Grand Bank had a population of 2,152 living in 1,026 of its 1,162 total private dwellings, a change of −6.8% from its 2016 population of 2,310. With a land area of 16.82 km^{2} (6.49 sq mi), it had a population density of 127.9/km^{2} (331.4/sq mi) in 2021.

== Tourist attractions ==
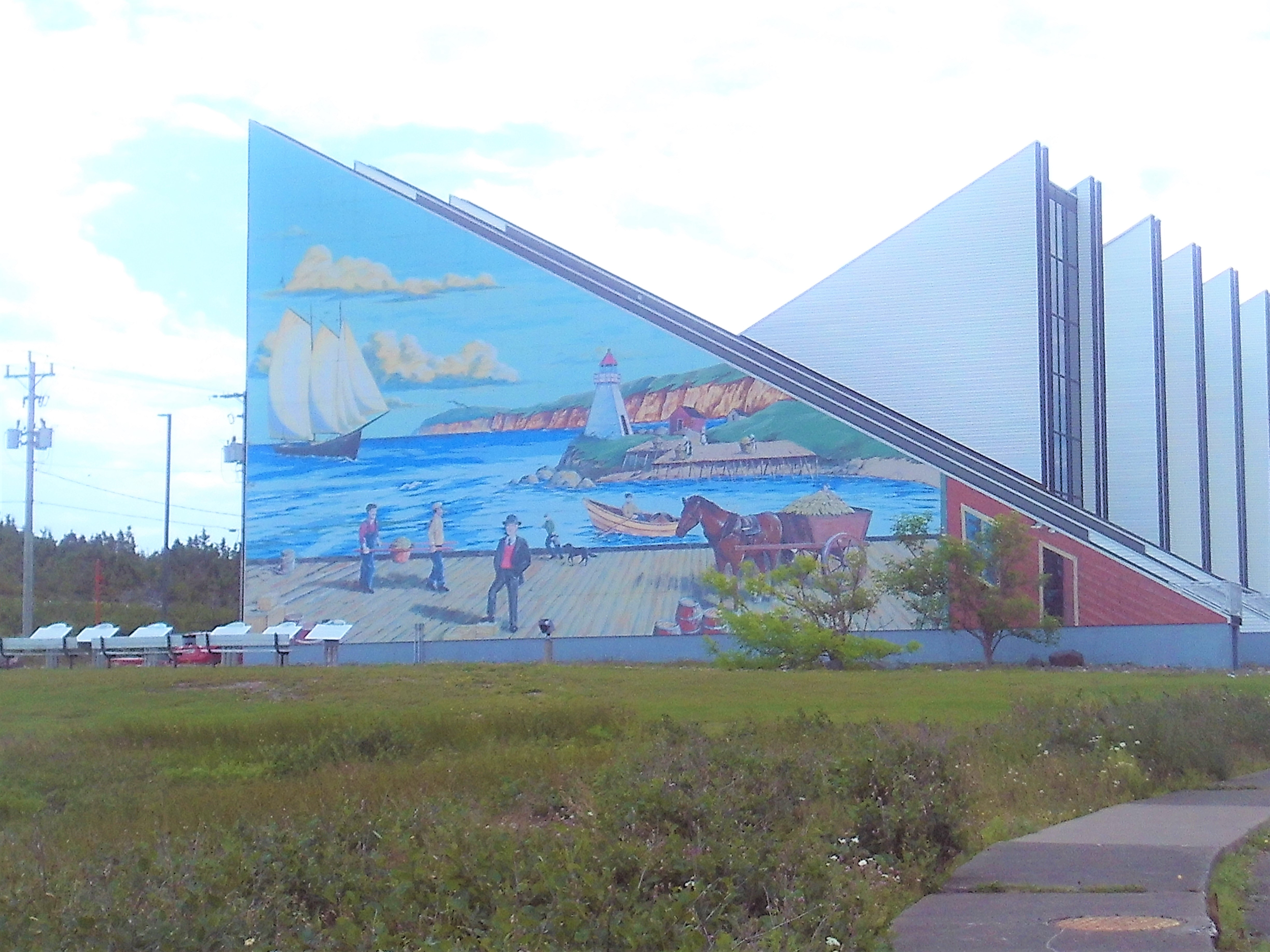
Seamen's Museum

- Southern Newfoundland Seamen's Museum
- Grand Bank Regional Theatre Festival
- Annual Grand Bank Summer Festival
- Harris House
- Mariner's Memorial
- Bait Depot
- Grand Bank Lighthouse
- Grande Meadows Golf Course – 30 km away: 9-hole, par 36, open May to October.
- St. Pierre and Miquelon – France's last outpost in North America.
  Minutes by air from Winterland or 70 minutes by sea from nearby Fortune (5 km from Grand Bank)

In recent years, Grand Bank has seen a tripling of visitors interested in the Queen Anne architecture in the older homes, the traditions of a seafaring people and the heritage still evident in the older businesses, stores, halls and museums. Heritage Canada's Main Street program has been a great success, as evident in the face-lift of many storefront properties. This program was designed to assist in the revitalization of the downtown of Grand Bank using its four components - organization, marketing, design and economic development.

== Climate ==
Climate data for Grand Bank
Month	Jan	Feb	Mar	Apr	May	Jun	Jul	Aug	Sep	Oct	Nov	Dec	Year
Record high °C (°F)	13 (55)	14 (57)	15 (59)	18 (64)	24.5 (76.1)	27 (81)	29.5 (85.1)	30 (86)	29 (84)	21.5 (70.7)	18 (64)	13 (55)	30 (86)
Mean daily maximum °C (°F)	−0.5 (31.1)	−0.6 (30.9)	2 (36)	6.5 (43.7)	12.2 (54.0)	16.4 (61.5)	20.6 (69.1)	21.1 (70.0)	17.4 (63.3)	11.7 (53.1)	6.7 (44.1)	2 (36)	9.6 (49.3)
Daily mean °C (°F)	−4.1 (24.6)	−4.4 (24.1)	−1.7 (28.9)	2.7 (36.9)	7.4 (45.3)	11.4 (52.5)	15.8 (60.4)	16.6 (61.9)	13.1 (55.6)	7.9 (46.2)	3.5 (38.3)	−1.1 (30.0)	5.6 (42.1)
Mean daily minimum °C (°F)	−7.7 (18.1)	−8.2 (17.2)	−5.4 (22.3)	−1.1 (30.0)	2.5 (36.5)	6.4 (43.5)	11 (52)	12 (54)	8.9 (48.0)	4.1 (39.4)	0.3 (32.5)	−4.1 (24.6)	1.6 (34.9)
Record low °C (°F)	−21 (−6)	−26 (−15)	−22.5 (−8.5)	−14 (7)	−7 (19)	−1 (30)	1 (34)	4 (39)	0 (32)	−6 (21)	−13 (9)	−20 (−4)	−26 (−15)
Average precipitation mm (inches)	127.4 (5.02)	122.7 (4.83)	117.1 (4.61)	124.8 (4.91)	112.5 (4.43)	112.1 (4.41)	92.3 (3.63)	87.3 (3.44)	143.5 (5.65)	153 (6.0)	140.1 (5.52)	128.2 (5.05)	1,461.1 (57.52)
Average rainfall mm (inches)	75.4 (2.97)	77.3 (3.04)	92.3 (3.63)	113.6 (4.47)	111.9 (4.41)	112.1 (4.41)	92.3 (3.63)	87.3 (3.44)	143.5 (5.65)	152.4 (6.00)	131.9 (5.19)	90.8 (3.57)	1,280.9 (50.43)
Average snowfall mm (inches)	52 (2.0)	45.4 (1.79)	24.9 (0.98)	11.1 (0.44)	0.5 (0.02)	0 (0)	0 (0)	0 (0)	0 (0)	0.6 (0.02)	8.2 (0.32)	37.5 (1.48)	180.2 (7.09)
Source: Environment Canada

- The climate of Grand Bank is classified as Boreal (Koppen Dfb).
- It enjoys one of the most favourable climates of Newfoundland and Labrador, mainly due to its position on the extreme southern coast of the Burin Peninsula.
- Winters are relatively mild with considerable variation in snow cover and heavy rainfall from October through December.
- The average high temperature in January is -0.5 °C - one of the warmest for all of Newfoundland and Labrador.
- Surface wind speeds average 20–30 km/hour, with 50–80 km/h typically sustained during low pressure systems. Very strong gusts (120–140 km/h) are a common feature along the south coast.
- During strong Arctic air outbreaks, the wind chill is typically in the -25 to -35 °C range on the island.
- July has an average high temperature of 20.6 °C; in August, it is 21.1 °C. Summers are generally cooled by low clouds and fog.
- There is less fog in Grand Bank than at other locations on the south coast where records are kept. Fog can often be seen around Grand Bank when the community itself is free of it. This is thought to be caused by a combination of the inland hills and ridges that cause the fog to evaporate before it reaches the town.
- Mean annual precipitation is 1461.1 mm, which is high due to the occurrence of cyclonic storms and in which most of the precipitation falls as rain (1280.9 mm or 81%).
- Snowfall in Grand Bank is about 180.2 mm annually.

== Schools ==
- John Burke High School

== Media ==
=== Television ===
- Channel 5 - CBC Television
- Channel 11 - NTV

=== Radio ===
- AM 740: CHCM ("VOCM"), news/talk/country music
- FM 90.3: CBNM, CBC Radio One
- FM 91.7: CBN-FM-5, CBC Radio 2
- FM 96.3: CHOZ ("OZFM"), hot AC
- FM 99.5: VOAR-2, Christian radio

== See also ==
- List of lighthouses in Canada
- List of cities and towns in Newfoundland and Labrador
