= Point au Gaul =

Town in Newfoundland and Labrador, Canada

- Town
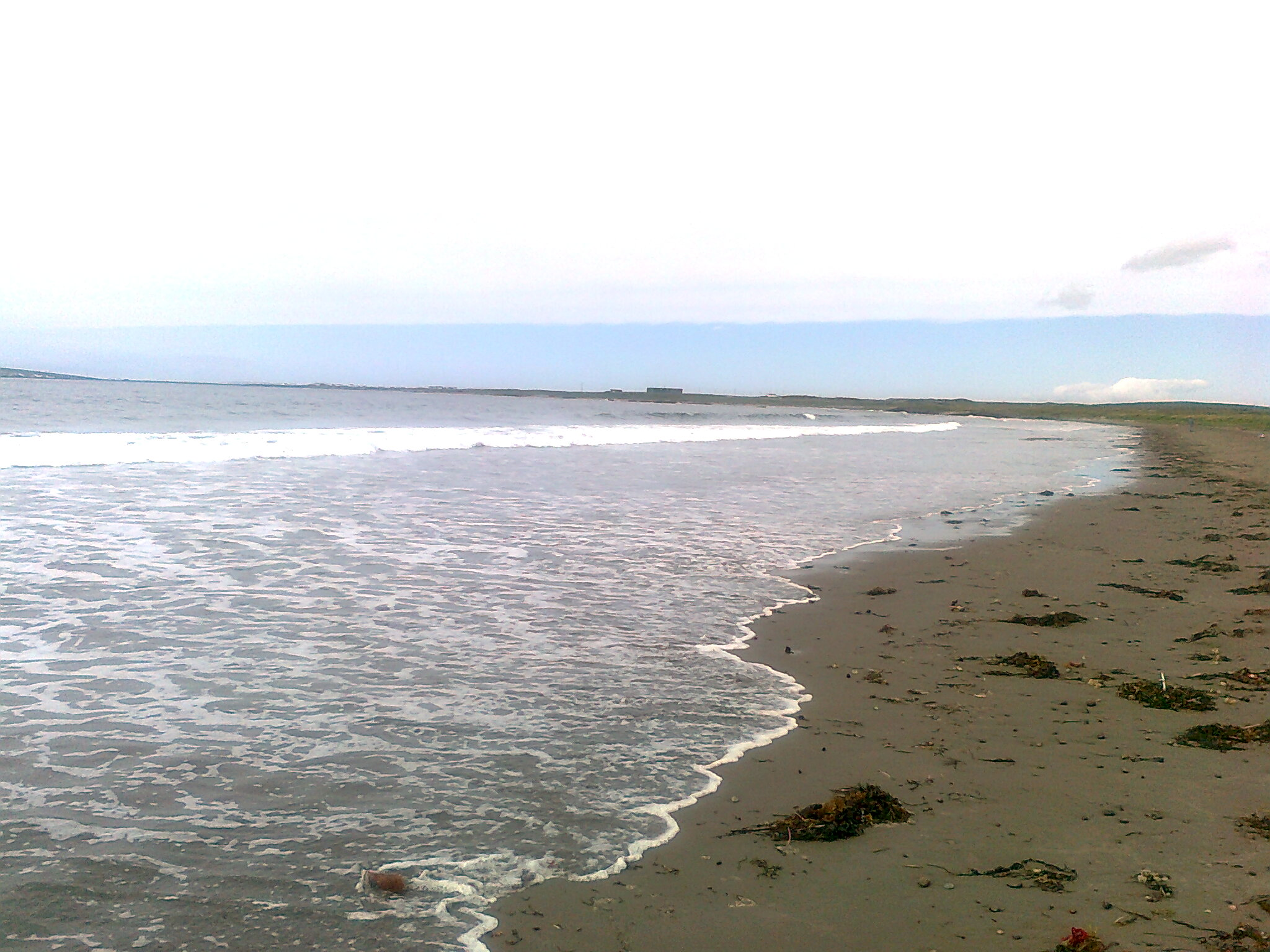

- Location of Point au Gaul in Newfoundland
- Coordinates: 46°52′02″N 55°44′50″W
- Country: Canada
- Province: Newfoundland and Labrador

Area
  - Land: 3.91 km^{2} (1.51 sq mi)

Population (2021)
  - Total: 67
  - Density: 22.5/km^{2} (58/sq mi)
- Time zone: UTC-3:30 (Newfoundland Time)
  - Summer (DST): UTC-2:30 (Newfoundland Daylight)
- Area code: 709
- Highways: Route 220

Point au Gaul is a town in the Canadian province of Newfoundland and Labrador, Canada. The town had a population of 67 in the Canada 2021 Census, down from 88 in 2016. Point au Gaul is approximately 76 km southeast of Marystown.

== Demographics ==
In the 2021 Census of Population conducted by Statistics Canada, Point au Gaul had a population of 67 living in 33 of its 41 total private dwellings, a change of −23.9% from its 2016 population of 88. With a land area of 3.89 km^{2} (1.50 sq mi), it had a population density of 17.2/km^{2} (44.6/sq mi) in 2021.

== See also ==
- Burin Peninsula
- List of cities and towns in Newfoundland and Labrador
