= Lawn, Newfoundland and Labrador =

Lawn
- Town
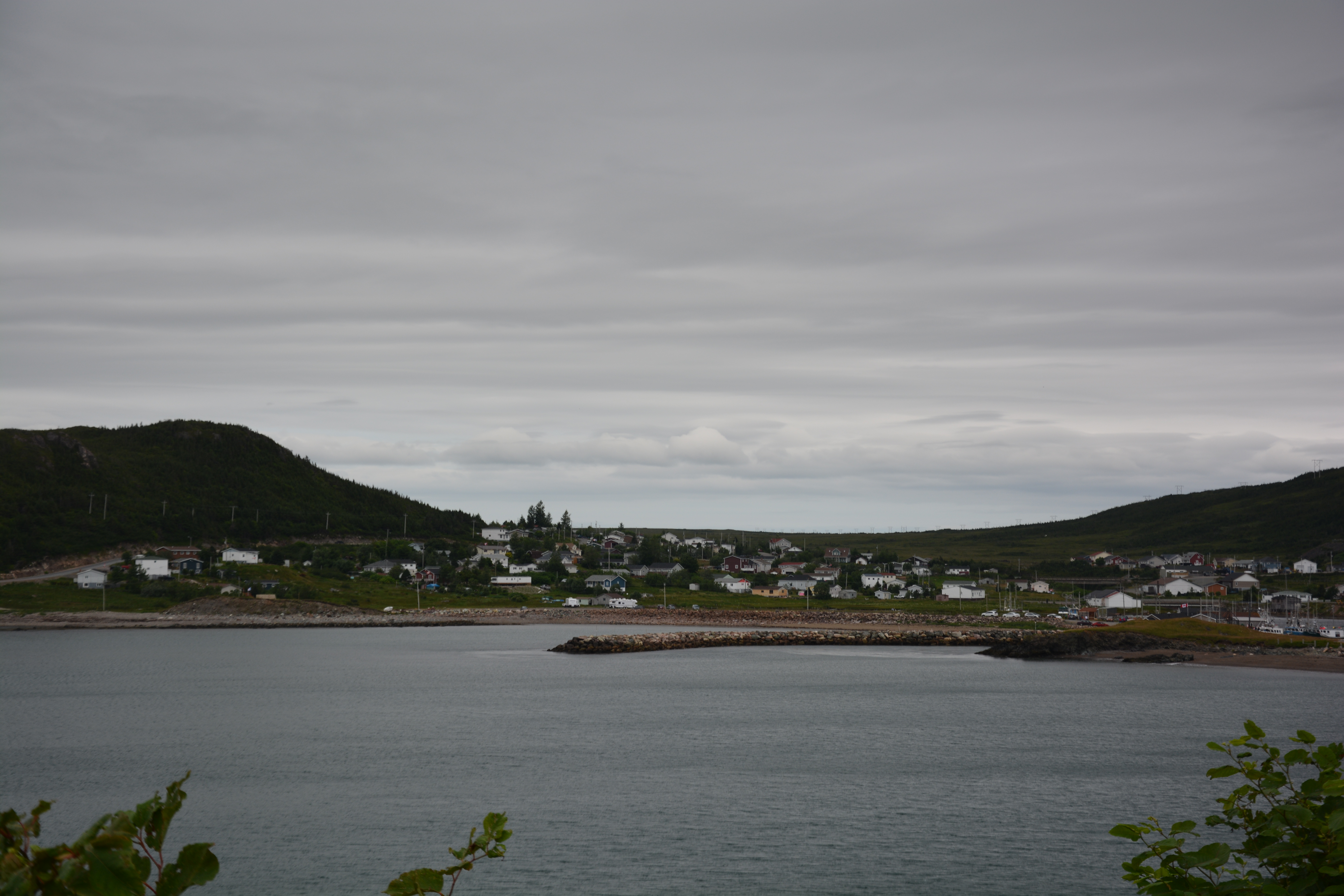

- Location of Lawn in Newfoundland
- Coordinates: 46°56′30″N 55°32′30″W
- Country: Canada
- Province: Newfoundland and Labrador

Population (2021)
  - Total: 583
- Time zone: UTC-3:30 (Newfoundland Time)
  - Summer (DST): UTC-2:30 (Newfoundland Daylight)
- A0E2E0: A0E2E0
- Area code: 709
- Highways: Route 220
- Website: https://www.townoflawn.com/

Lawn is a town located at the tip of the Burin Peninsula on Newfoundland's South coast, Newfoundland and Labrador. Lawn has a total population of 583 people, and is spread around a small harbor in a relatively lush valley. According to one local tradition it was this lushness that inspired Captain James Cook to name the place Lawn Harbour. But it has also been speculated that a Frenchman named the community after a doe caribou that he spotted there.

Lawn is a community whose survival over the past two hundred years has depended entirely on the fishery. The abundance of fish in the waters surrounding Lawn (formerly known as Laun) attracted seasonal fishermen from France, Portugal, Spain and England. These fishermen came over in large fishing ships and returned to their homelands in the fall. This type of migratory fishery continued to exist on the Burin Peninsula well into the eighteen hundreds. However, in 1763 the French authorities began to encourage permanent settlement of St. Pierre, which would permanently transform the character of the local fishery. According to the journals of travelling Methodist Minister John Lewis, the population of Lawn in the fall of 1817 was 104, including 90 Catholics and 14 Protestants. The town of Lawn was formed as Community Council in 1952 and was changed to a Town Council in 1968.

== History ==
One of Newfoundland's first hydroelectric generators was commissioned in Lawn in 1930.

=== 1942 naval disaster ===
In the pre-dawn hours of February 18, 1942, three United States Navy ships ran aground on the shore of the Burin Peninsula between Lawn and the nearby community of St. Lawrence. It was determined that the USS Pollux, USS Truxtun and USS Wilkes made a navigation error while en route to Naval Station Argentia. Under exceptionally difficult storm and ice conditions eight residents of Lawn assisted in the rescue of survivors. 185 sailors survived and 203 died as a result of the disaster.

== Demographics ==
In the 2021 Census of Population conducted by Statistics Canada, Lawn had a population of 583 living in 253 of its 291 total private dwellings, a change of −6.6% from its 2016 population of 624. With a land area of 3.52 km^{2} (1.36 sq mi), it had a population density of 165.6/km^{2} (429.0/sq mi) in 2021.

== Notable people ==
- Jesse Van Rootselaar, perpetrator in the 2026 Tumbler Ridge shooting, briefly resided in Lawn

== See also ==
- Burin Peninsula
- List of cities and towns in Newfoundland and Labrador
