= Little St. Lawrence =

Human settlement in Newfoundland, Canada

Coordinates: 46°56′N 55°22′W

Little St. Lawrence is a local service district and designated place in the Canadian province of Newfoundland and Labrador.

== History ==
The first postmistress was Mrs. Mary Clarke.

== Geography ==
Little St. Lawrence is in Newfoundland within Subdivision F of Division No. 2.

== Demographics ==
As a designated place in the 2016 Census of Population conducted by Statistics Canada, Little St. Lawrence recorded a population of 117 living in 47 of its 62 total private dwellings, a change of -6.4% from its 2011 population of 125. With a land area of 4.85 km^{2} (1.87 sq mi), it had a population density of 24.1/km^{2} (62.5/sq mi) in 2016.

== Government ==
Little St. Lawrence is a local service district (LSD) that is governed by a committee responsible for the provision of certain services to the community. The chair of the LSD committee is Karen Lundrigan.

== See also ==
- List of communities in Newfoundland and Labrador
- List of designated places in Newfoundland and Labrador
- List of local service districts in Newfoundland and Labrador
