= USS Pollux (AKS-2) =

Cargo ship of the United States Navy

Coordinates: 46°52′37.1″N 55°28′43.8″W

- USS Pollux (AKS-2)

History

United States
- Name: USS Pollux
- Namesake: Pollux, the southern of two bright stars in the constellation Gemini, twin star of Castor
- Builder: Federal Shipbuilding and Drydock Company, New Jersey
- Laid down: 26 May 1939, as SS Comet
- Launched: 16 December 1939
- Acquired: 16 January 1941
- Commissioned: 6 May 1941
- Stricken: 25 March 1942
- Fate: Ran aground and sank, 18 February 1942

General characteristics
- Class & type: Castor-class general stores issue ship
- Displacement: 7,350 long tons (7,468 t) light; 13,910 long tons (14,133 t) full load
- Length: 459 ft 2 in (140 m)
- Beam: 63 ft (19 m)
- Draft: 26 ft 5 in (8.05 m)
- Propulsion: Steam turbine, single shaft, 6,000 hp (4,474 kW)
- Speed: 17 knots (31 km/h; 20 mph)
- Complement: 199 officers and enlisted
- Armament: 1 × 5"/38 caliber gun; 4 × 3"/50 caliber guns

The second USS Pollux (AKS-2) was a Castor-class general stores issue ship.

Pollux was laid down by the Federal Shipbuilding and Dry Dock Co., Hoboken, N.J. as SS Comet on 26 May 1939; launched on 16 December 1939, acquired by the Navy on 16 January 1941; converted to a general stores ship by the Brewers Shipbuilding and Dry Dock Co., Hoboken, N.J., and commissioned on 6 May 1941.

== Service history ==
Pollux was ready for sea on 24 May 1941, and served with the Atlantic Fleet on regular provisioning cruises.

== Loss ==
On 18 February 1942 Pollux grounded during a storm at Lawn Point off Newfoundland and was wrecked with 93 fatalities. USS Truxtun (DD-229) was also wrecked, at Chambers Cove, off St. Lawrence harbour with 110 fatalities. USS Wilkes (DD-441) grounded at the same time, but made way with no fatalities.

At 04:14 on the 18th, searchlights were sighted revealing land 2 points on the port bow. The Commanding Officer of Pollux had just entered the bridge from the chart house, and immediately gave the order for full speed astern, hard right rudder and sounding collision quarters. But it was too late and 3 minutes later the ship grounded. Realizing that she was hard aground and starting to go down slightly by the head, the Commanding Officer ordered full speed ahead to prevent the ship from sliding off and sinking in deep water.

Due to the extremely difficult surf caused by the gale raging in the Atlantic and the bitterness of the winter weather loss of life was heavy on both Pollux and Truxtun. Heroic efforts to swim lines ashore failed due to the inability to handle them when they became oil soaked. Some of the crew attempted to swim ashore, many unsuccessfully. Finally lines with a boatswain's chair were rigged to a ledge and the remaining personnel were conveyed ashore. Truxtun broke up almost immediately after grounding and soon thereafter Pollux did likewise. The survivors owed their rescue in large measure to the tireless, efficient and in many cases heroic action of the people of Lawn and St. Lawrence, Newfoundland.

Pollux was struck from the Naval Vessel Register on 25 March 1942.

The total loss of life between both the USS Pollux and the USS Truxtun was 203 victims.
