= St. Lawrence, Newfoundland and Labrador =

St. Lawrence
- Town
- Location of St. Lawrence in Newfoundland St. Lawrence (Canada)
- Coordinates: 46°54′29″N 55°24′16″W
- Country: Canada
- Province: Newfoundland and Labrador

Government
  - MP: Jonathan Rowe (C)
  - MHA: Paul Pike (L)

Area (2016)
  - Land: 35.5 km^{2} (13.7 sq mi)
- Elevation: 48.5 m (159 ft)

Population (2021)
  - Total: 1,115
  - Density: 33.6/km^{2} (87/sq mi)
- Time zone: UTC−03:30 (NST)
  - Summer (DST): UTC−02:30 (NDT)
- Postal code: A0E 2V0
- Area code: 709
- Highways: Route 220
- Website: https://www.townofstlawrence.com/

St. Lawrence is a town located on the Burin Peninsula of Newfoundland and Labrador. As of the 2021 Canadian Census, the population of St. Lawrence was 1,115, down from the 2011 Canadian Census of 1,244. Popular family names in the town include Turpin, Tarrant, Slaney, Pike, Lake, Drake and Edwards.

== History ==
St. Lawrence was named by a group of shipwrecked sailors who came to the Newfoundland in 1583 with Sir Humphrey Gilbert. During the expedition, their vessel, Delight, sank off Sable Island. Sixteen of her crew drifted in a lifeboat for seven days before coming ashore on the South Coast in Little St. Lawrence. Richard Clarke, the master of the doomed ship, wrote a dramatic account of the event in 1584.

The area was known to English, French, and Basque fishermen in the 1500s and there were a few French stages at St. Lawrence itself, for the early French ship fishermen for the fishing season. However, settlement actually began in the early to mid-1700s. Captain James Cook surveyed the St. Lawrence area and vicinity in 1765. St. Lawrence was a hive of activity in 1784 when Newmans opened its store in Little St. Lawrence and business was soon rivalling that of St. John's (the capital city). Newmans closed its Little St. Lawrence store in 1811.

On 18 November 1929, a tsunami struck the area following the 1929 Grand Banks earthquake; 27 people lost their lives, and many along the coast lost their houses, boats, stages and supplies.

=== USS Pollux and USS Truxtun ===
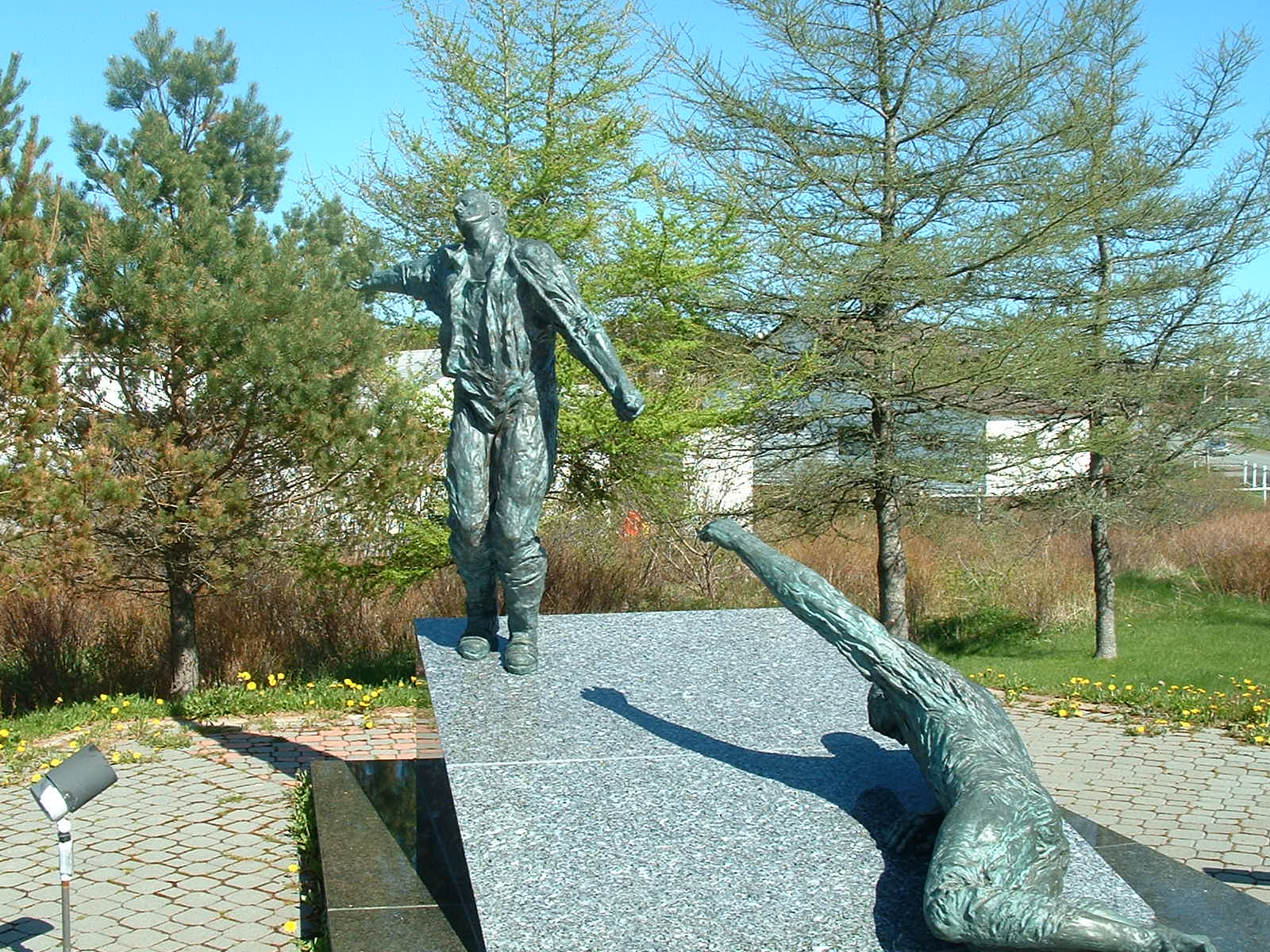
Echoes of Valour Memorial

On 18 February 1942, over 200 American sailors died when USS Truxtun ran aground near Chambers Cove and USS Pollux ran aground at Lawn Point. Tremendous community efforts and personal bravery by the citizens of Lawn and St. Lawrence reduced the high death toll. Residents of St. Lawrence and Lawn saved approximately 200 sailors.

In 1954 the U.S. Navy built a hospital at St. Lawrence in gratitude for their work.

In 1992, a memorial entitled 'Echoes of Valour' was erected in dedication of the mining industry in St. Lawrence, the sailors who died in the disasters, and those who lost their lives in the world wars.

== Demographics ==
In the 2021 Census of Population conducted by Statistics Canada, St. Lawrence had a population of 1,115 living in 485 of its 598 total private dwellings, a change of −6.5% from its 2016 population of 1,192. With a land area of 34.86 km^{2} (13.46 sq mi), it had a population density of 32.0/km^{2} (82.8/sq mi) in 2021.

== Economy ==
Fishing was the main economic activity of the area for hundreds of years due to the proximity of St. Lawrence with the Grand Banks. The November 1929 tsunami "added greatly to the hardship already inflicted by the Great Depression and the collapse of the saltfish trade", according to Heritage Newfoundland.

Fluorspar (also called fluorite) deposits had been noted as early as 1843 but it was not until 1933 that mining began. The operation was started by American Walter Siebert whose company was named the St. Lawrence Corporation of Newfoundland. Backbreaking work and no pay initially, finally led to a more significant mine by 1937; a second mine also opened in 1937, the American Newfoundland Fluorspar Company. The fluorspar mines in St. Lawrence were major employers until business declined in the 1970s; the mines had closed by 1978. The most noteworthy heritage was the "numerous deaths associated with fluorspar mining, and the physical and social costs of widespread industrial disease", according to a Heritage Newfoundland report. The author of a book published in 2019 spoke of the "deaths and serious injuries from the beginning in a manifestly unsafe workplace" in an interview with Maclean's. Lung cancer "caused by radioactivity-laced water piled onto the other lung and heart disorders initiated by the dust" led to 313 deaths over the decades, he said.

In 2011 Canada Fluorspar Inc. outlined preparations to open a fluorspar mine on the site of the old mine. The federal government provided $5 million in funding in 2017 and the provincial government provided a loan of $17 million to finance the re-opening. Production finally commenced in mid-2018. In spring 2019, the company was planning to develop a new shipping port on the west side of Burin Peninsula as a more affordable means of moving their product to markets. The company believed that the port would also allow for shipping aggregates and the company president said that it would allow for fluorspar operations to continue for ten years longer than the previously-predicted eight years.

A wind project was initiated by the Government of Newfoundland and Labrador for St. Lawrence. The project resulted in the installation of nine Vestas V90-3MW wind turbines. As of September 2019, all nine were operational.

A plan to develop a major industrial park enabled the town to obtain $1.3 million in funding from the provincial and federal government, combined, to develop eight fully service lots. The 2019 plan stalled in September, however. At the time, some argued that the fluorspar mine was not adding enough to the local economy.

On February 21, 2022, Canada Fluorspar Inc. announced that they were going bankrupt. On that day, a total of 280 employees were laid off. On March 6, the provincial government reached a financing agreement with Bridging Finance Ltd. in an attempt to find a new buyer.

== Education ==
St. Lawrence has a K-12 School, St. Lawrence Academy. The school was initially the high school for the town "St. Lawrence Central High School". With dwindling enrollment in the 1990s the school was renamed St. Lawrence Academy and encompassed K-6 upon the closure of Marian Elementary in 1999.

== Sport ==
St. Lawrence has been referred to as the 'Soccer Capital of Newfoundland’. St. Lawrence Centennial Soccer Field has been listed on the Historic Places in Canada since 2005.

The St. Lawrence soccer teams have been a powerhouse of soccer both on the Burin Peninsula where they have dominated. As well at the provincial level success has also been achieved culminating in the Laurentians being named the "Team of the Decade" for the 70's and 90's.

The town has nine organized soccer teams. The St. Lawrence Laurentians soccer club is the most recognized.

== Climate ==
St. Lawrence has a warm-summer humid continental climate (Dfb) bordering on a subarctic climate (Dfc), albeit an ocean moderated one more akin to a subpolar oceanic climate or to the even more similar climate of the Kuril Islands off Eurasia than one like that of Fairbanks, Alaska. The seasonal lag rivals that of the Pacific coast in California, with August being the warmest month and September and July having very similar temperatures. The coldest month is February. Summer lasts from mid-July through mid-September and winter lasts from late November through early May.

Climate data for St. Lawrence Climate ID: 8403619; coordinates 46°55′N 55°23′W; elevation: 48.5 m (159 ft); WMO ID: 71110; 1991–2020 normals, extremes 1966–present
Month	Jan	Feb	Mar	Apr	May	Jun	Jul	Aug	Sep	Oct	Nov	Dec	Year
Record high humidex	15.5	10.1	14.0	16.7	26.2	33.9	41.2	44.1	43.2	29.1	20.0	14.9	44.1
Record high °C (°F)	11.2 (52.2)	11.9 (53.4)	14.0 (57.2)	17.5 (63.5)	27.1 (80.8)	27.8 (82.0)	29.3 (84.7)	30.1 (86.2)	29.4 (84.9)	23.8 (74.8)	18.1 (64.6)	12.7 (54.9)	30.1 (86.2)
Mean daily maximum °C (°F)	0.1 (32.2)	−0.4 (31.3)	1.7 (35.1)	6.1 (43.0)	10.9 (51.6)	14.9 (58.8)	18.8 (65.8)	20.1 (68.2)	17.2 (63.0)	12.1 (53.8)	7.5 (45.5)	2.9 (37.2)	9.3 (48.7)
Daily mean °C (°F)	−3.4 (25.9)	−3.9 (25.0)	−1.8 (28.8)	2.3 (36.1)	6.6 (43.9)	10.6 (51.1)	15.0 (59.0)	16.2 (61.2)	13.1 (55.6)	8.3 (46.9)	4.1 (39.4)	−0.3 (31.5)	5.6 (42.1)
Mean daily minimum °C (°F)	−6.9 (19.6)	−7.4 (18.7)	−5.2 (22.6)	−1.5 (29.3)	2.2 (36.0)	6.3 (43.3)	11.1 (52.0)	12.4 (54.3)	8.9 (48.0)	4.5 (40.1)	0.8 (33.4)	−3.5 (25.7)	1.8 (35.2)
Record low °C (°F)	−20.6 (−5.1)	−25.0 (−13.0)	−21.4 (−6.5)	−15.6 (3.9)	−8.9 (16.0)	−10.7 (12.7)	0.2 (32.4)	2.5 (36.5)	−1.7 (28.9)	−5.8 (21.6)	−12.2 (10.0)	−19.4 (−2.9)	−25.0 (−13.0)
Record low wind chill	−33.2	−36.6	−34.6	−18.4	−16.1	−7.3	0.0	0.0	−5.6	−11.3	−24.4	−30.4	−36.6
Average precipitation mm (inches)	130.7 (5.15)	112.2 (4.42)	116.7 (4.59)	103.5 (4.07)	118.1 (4.65)	103.4 (4.07)	109.3 (4.30)	106.9 (4.21)	132.1 (5.20)	162.4 (6.39)	152.5 (6.00)	157.6 (6.20)	1,505.3 (59.26)
Average rainfall mm (inches)	74.6 (2.94)	57.9 (2.28)	82.3 (3.24)	105.5 (4.15)	115.8 (4.56)	132.9 (5.23)	109.4 (4.31)	106.1 (4.18)	157.4 (6.20)	155.7 (6.13)	134.5 (5.30)	91.7 (3.61)	1,323.8 (52.13)
Average snowfall cm (inches)	68.7 (27.0)	65.0 (25.6)	42.2 (16.6)	13.5 (5.3)	2.3 (0.9)	0.3 (0.1)	0.0 (0.0)	0.0 (0.0)	0.0 (0.0)	1.7 (0.7)	11.8 (4.6)	42.4 (16.7)	247.8 (97.6)
Average precipitation days (≥ 0.2 mm)	20.4	17.0	16.4	15.3	14.4	13.5	15.4	15.4	13.9	17.0	17.1	20.1	195.8
Average rainy days (≥ 0.2 mm)	7.9	6.6	9.2	11.4	14.1	13.0	13.3	12.8	13.4	16.0	13.9	10.8	142.3
Average snowy days (≥ 0.2 cm)	15.2	13.1	9.5	4.0	0.8	0.0	0.0	0.0	0.0	0.2	3.2	11.0	57.1
Average relative humidity (%) (at 1500 LST)	83.7	82.1	78.1	75.5	72.8	76.6	82.4	80.7	77.8	78.4	81.8	85.0	79.6
Source: Environment and Climate Change Canada (rain/rain days, snow/snow days 1971–2000)
