= Fox Cove-Mortier =

- Town
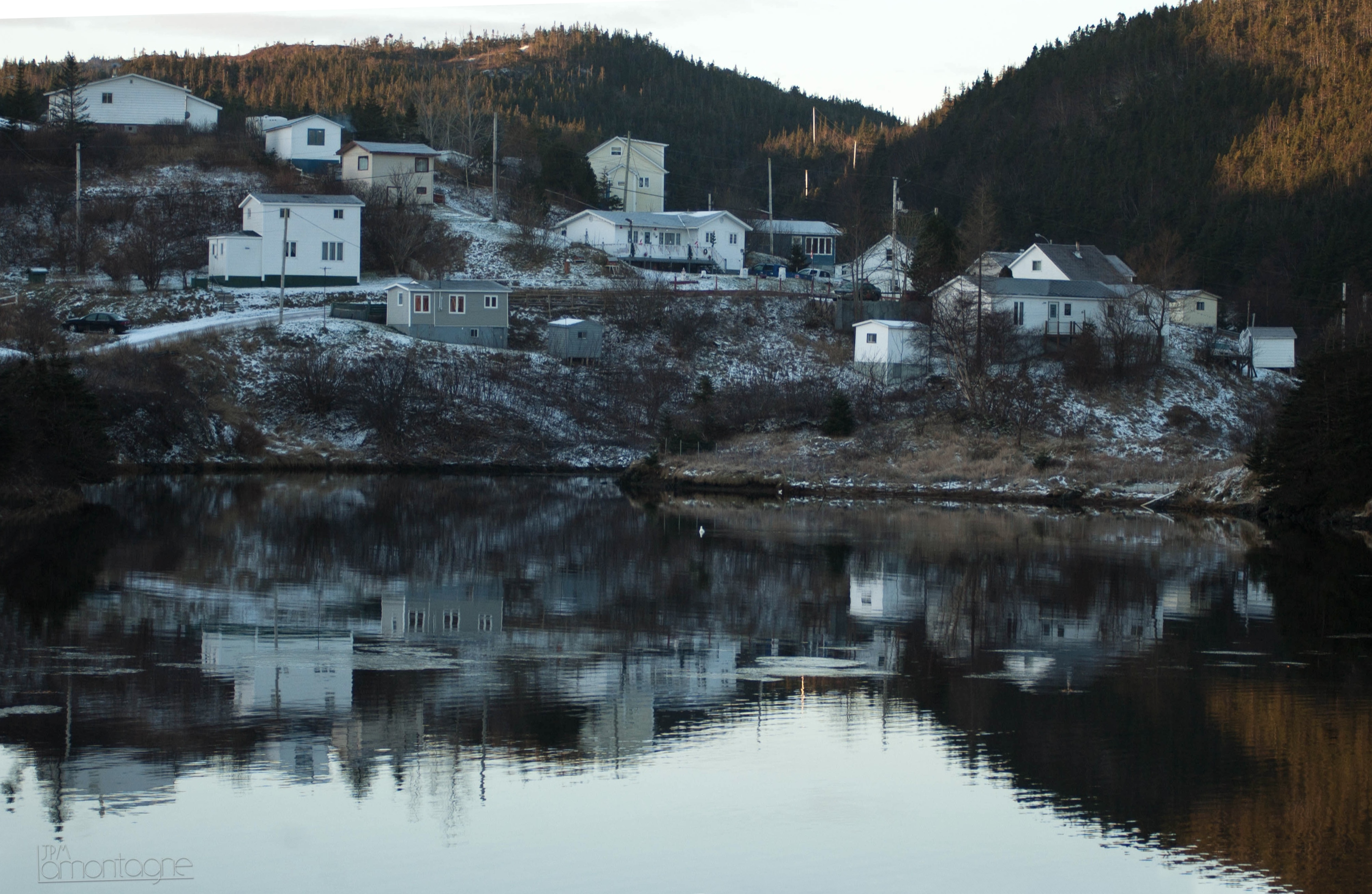

- Location of Fox Cove-Mortier in Newfoundland
- Coordinates: 47°5′33.23″N 55°6′12.50″W
- Country: Canada
- Province: Newfoundland and Labrador

Population (2021)
  - Total: 252
- Time zone: UTC-3:30 (Newfoundland Time)
  - Summer (DST): UTC-2:30 (Newfoundland Daylight)
- Postal code span: a0e
- Area code: 709
- Highways: Route 221

Fox Cove-Mortier is a town east of Marystown, Newfoundland and Labrador on the Burin Peninsula. It was traditionally supported by the fishing industry, and has a long and storied history in the fish trade between Newfoundland and the Caribbean.

== Demographics ==
In the 2021 Census of Population conducted by Statistics Canada, Fox Cove-Mortier had a population of 252 living in 119 of its 148 total private dwellings, a change of −14.6% from its 2016 population of 295. With a land area of 25.39 km^{2} (9.80 sq mi), it had a population density of 9.9/km^{2} (25.7/sq mi) in 2021.

== See also ==
- List of cities and towns in Newfoundland and Labrador
