= Port au Bras =

Settlement in Newfoundland and Labrador, Canada

Coordinates: 47.060°N 55.137°W

Location of Port au Bras in Newfoundland and Labrador

Port au Bras is a settlement in Newfoundland and Labrador, Canada.

In 1929 a large tsunami struck the Burin Peninsula, caused by a 7.2 magnitude earthquake about 265km off the coast. The tsunami killed 28 people and caused approximately C$1 million in damage across the entire peninsula. Port au Bras was one of the worst-affected neighbourhoods due to the long narrow bay around which the settlement is built, which caused the water level to rise by between 13 and 27 meters.
