= Lamaline =

Coordinates: 46.867°N 55.817°W

- Town
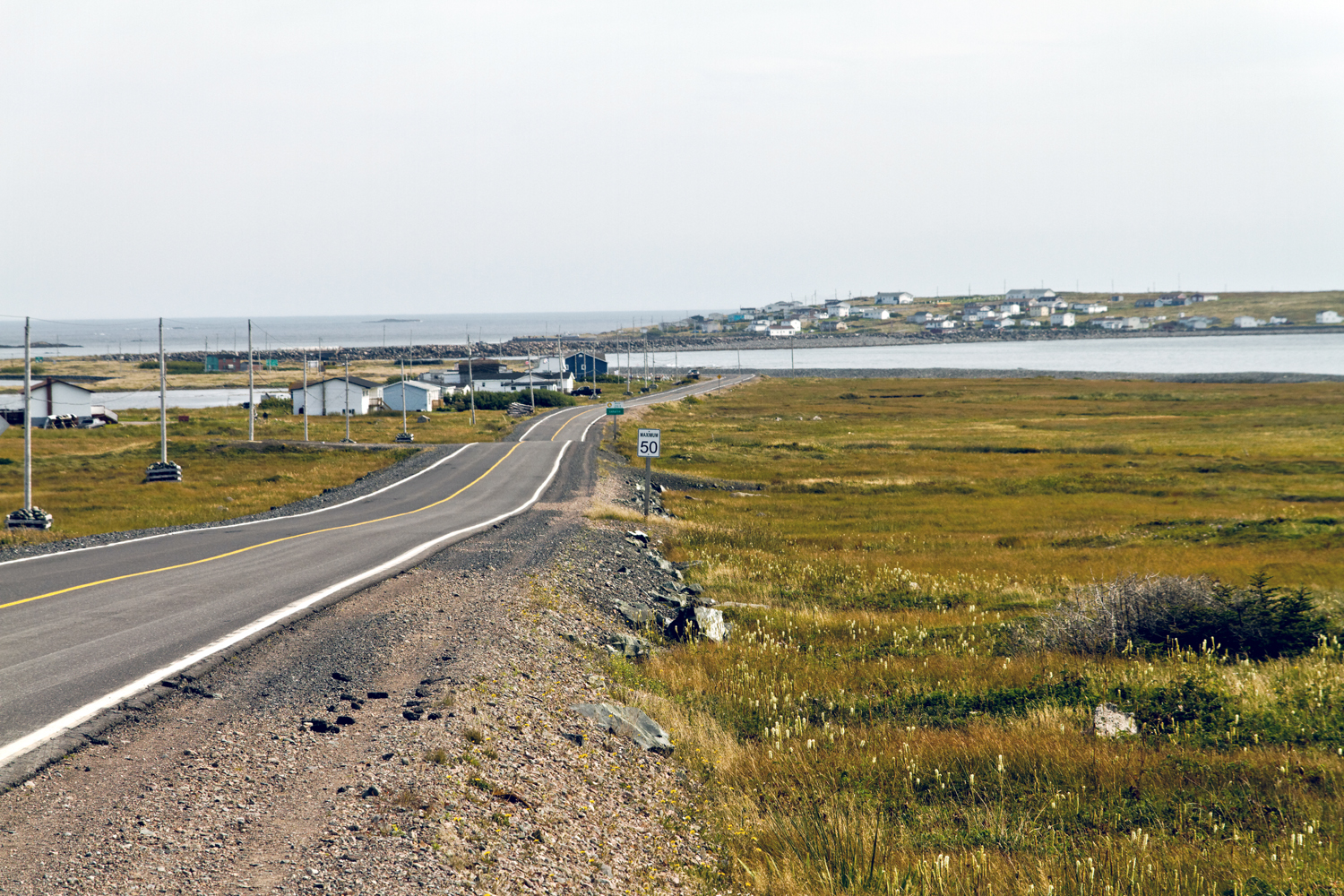
- Route 220 in Lamaline
- Interactive map of Lamaline
- Country: Canada
- Province: Newfoundland and Labrador

Government
  - Mayor: Marie Collins
  - MP: Jonathan Rowe (CON), Terra Nova—The Peninsulas

Population (2021)
  - Total: 218
- Time zone: UTC-3:30 (Newfoundland Time)
  - Summer (DST): UTC-2:30 (Newfoundland Daylight)
- Postal code: AOE 2C0
- Area code: 709
- Highways: Route 220

Lamaline is a town in the Canadian province of Newfoundland and Labrador. The town had a population of 480 in 1940, 643 in 1956 and 218 in the Canada 2021 Census.

John Lewis, a Welsh Methodist missionary based at Burin, recorded a population of 254 in the fall of 1817. Of these 254 people, 191 were Protestants and 63 were Catholics. Methodist Missionary William Marshall noted the population of "Lamalin" to contain approximately 100 Catholics and 300 total inhabitants in the summer of 1839. The Way Office was established in 1863 and the first Waymaster was James Pittman. As of 1871, the population was recorded at 310. The community was centred around the prosecution of the local cod fishery at the time, favouring the "bultow" or longline method. The town also featured a port of entry, and benefited from "considerable trade" with the local French colony St. Pierre.

== Demographics ==
In the 2021 Census of Population conducted by Statistics Canada, Lamaline had a population of 218 living in 101 of its 131 total private dwellings, a change of −18.4% from its 2016 population of 267. With a land area of 79.75 km^{2} (30.79 sq mi), it had a population density of 2.7/km^{2} (7.1/sq mi) in 2021.

Historical populations
Year	Pop.	±%
1901	709	—
1911	821	+15.8%
1970	540	−34.2%
1996	440	−18.5%
2001	346	−21.4%
2006	315	−9.0%
2011	286	−9.2%
2016	267	−6.6%
2021	218	−18.4%

== See also ==
- Allan's Island, Newfoundland and Labrador
- List of cities and towns in Newfoundland and Labrador
