= Burin, Newfoundland and Labrador =

Burin
- Town
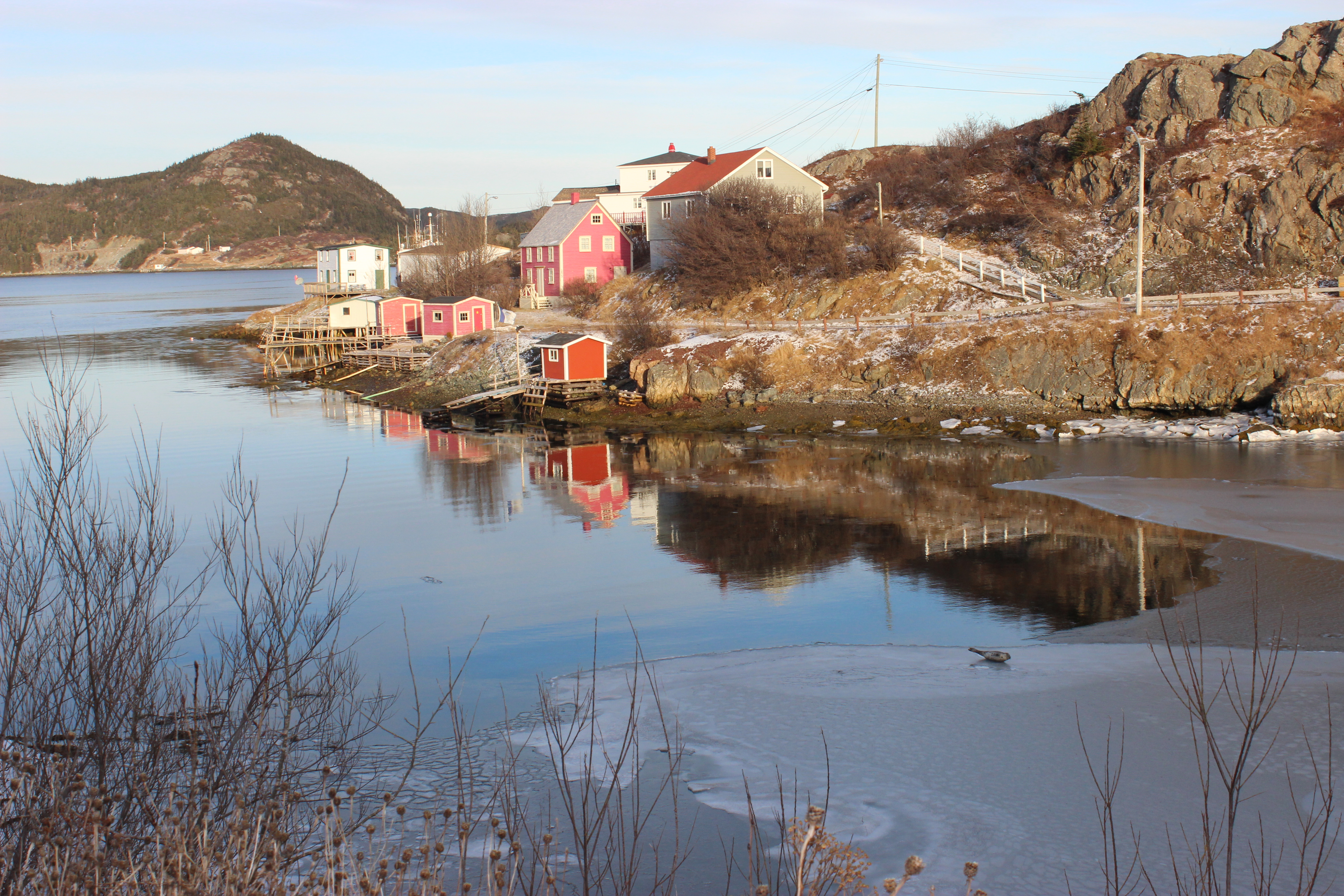

- Seal
- Nickname: The Boot
- Location of Burin in Newfoundland
- Coordinates: 47°03′N 55°11′W
- Country: Canada
- Province: Newfoundland and Labrador
- Settled: 1718
- Incorporated: 1950

Government
  - Mayor: Kevin Lundrigan

Area
  - Land: 34.14 km^{2} (13.18 sq mi)

Population (2021)
  - Total: 2,237
  - Density: 67.8/km^{2} (176/sq mi)
- Time zone: UTC-3:30 (Newfoundland Time)
  - Summer (DST): UTC-2:30 (Newfoundland Daylight)
- Area code: 709
- Highways: Route 220; Route 221; Route 222
- Website: townofburin.com

Burin (/ˈbjʊərɪn/ BURE-in) is a town on the Burin Peninsula in Placentia Bay, Newfoundland and Labrador, Canada. The Burin Peninsula is often affectionately nicknamed "The Boot" due to its resemblance to the footwear when seen on a map, with the town of Burin located near the "heel". Burin is approximately 318 km from the capital of St. John's. Settlement in Burin dates to the early 18th century, although documentary evidence indicates that French fishermen had been fishing and exploring the area even earlier.

== History ==
The Burin area was first used by Basque and French fishermen in the 1600s, and was first settled by English fishermen shortly after the Peace of Utrecht in 1713. The town was incorporated in 1950, and included Burin North, Ship Cove and Burin Bay. In 1970, the town limits were expanded and now include Collin's Cove, Path End, Bull's Cove, Black Duck Cove, Long Cove, Green Hill, Little Salmonier, Hollett's Farm, Burin Bay Arm, and Salt Pond.

== Demographics ==
In the 2021 Census of Population conducted by Statistics Canada, Burin had a population of 2,237 living in 1,008 of its 1,155 total private dwellings, a change of −3.4% from its 2016 population of 2,315. With a land area of 34.49 km^{2} (13.32 sq mi), it had a population density of 64.9/km^{2} (168.0/sq mi) in 2021.

== Economy ==
Until the early 1990s, the local economy was largely still dependent on the fishing industry. The federally imposed cod moratorium (which was instituted in 1992) had a heavy impact on the fishing industry as a whole. One of the main employers on the Burin peninsula was Fishery Products International (FPI), with fish processing plants located in Fortune, Marystown, and the largest in Burin. The processing plant in Burin was converted to a cannabis production facility in 2021.

The tourism sector has grown in the absence of the fishing industry. Museums such as the Heritage House and Old Colony Trust remind people of what life was like in early Burin. The Burin Heritage Days occur in August at the Heritage Museum site, with many locals dressing in period clothing, a plethora of local musicians and dancers who entertain, and a fireworks show to the end the event.

== Education ==
The school systems in Newfoundland underwent a change from denominational to a fully integrated system in the mid-1990s. Originally, there were two school systems under the denominational set-up — the Roman Catholic (R.C.) School Board and the Integrated School Board. Schools in the R.C. system included St. Patrick's elementary school (K-6) and Father Berney Memorial High School (7-12). The Integrated Schools included Sheen's Hill Elementary, Harfitt Primary, Donald C. Jameson Academy (4-8), and Pearce Regional High School (9-12). The schools of both systems served students from Burin as well as the neighbouring communities of Epworth, Corbin, Mortier, Fox Cove, Frenchman's Cove, and Garnish and Marystown; although Marystown did have two of its own R.C. schools, Sacred Heart Elementary (K-6) and Marystown Central High School (7-12), as well as a Pentecostal School.

With the removal of the denominational school system, each of the schools were combined into one system to provide education for the area. Marystown Central High School, Sacred Heart Elementary, Pearce Junior High and Donald C. Jamieson Academy now remain, with Fr. Berney Memorial housing the school board offices.

Post secondary institutions include three public trade colleges, College of the North Atlantic, Keyin College and Centrac College.

== Sports/Recreation ==
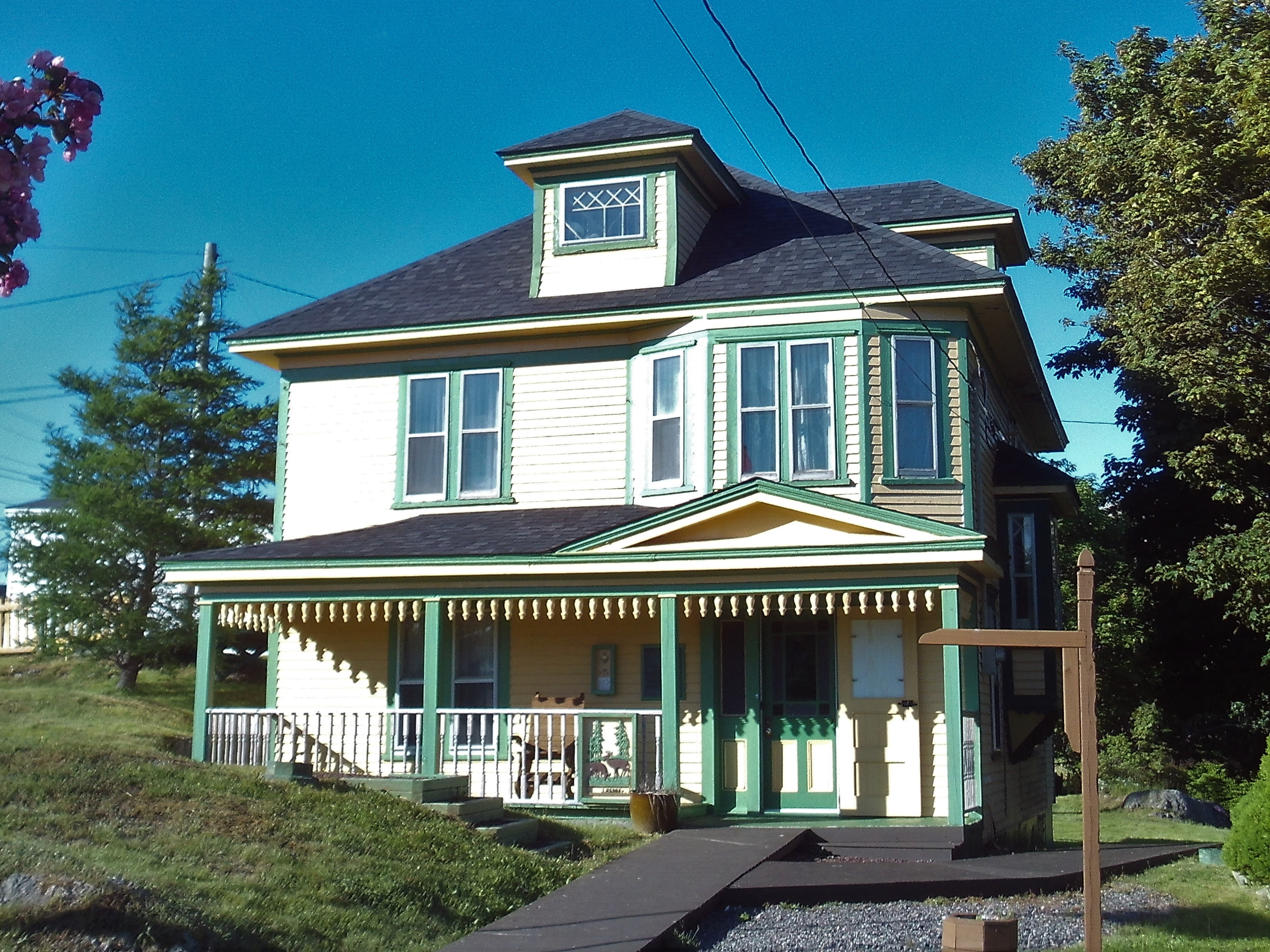
Heritage House in Burin

Burin athletes compete in a number of disciplines, including softball, soccer, track and field, and tennis. Hockey players and figure skaters can travel to nearby Marystown to compete at the local arena. Recreational facilities include:

- Softball diamond
- Soccer pitch (home to the 2-time Provincial Challenge Cup Champions "Burin Eagles")
- Several scenic walking trails
- Tennis courts
- Outdoor basketball facilities
- Golden sands beach resort
- A number of freshwater lakes and ponds frequently used for swimming
- Scenic boardwalk located on the Atlantic Ocean

Burin is also popular with those interested in gaming, camping and with offroad enthusiasts.

== Notable people ==
- Albert Anstey, darts player
- Anna Lambe, Actress
- Kathy Dunderdale, 10th Premier of Newfoundland and Labrador
