= Fortune Bay-Cape La Hune =

Provincial electoral district in Newfoundland and Labrador, Canada

Coordinates: 48.053°N 56.276°W

Newfoundland and Labrador electoral district
- Fortune Bay-Cape La Hune in relation to other districts in Newfoundland

Provincial electoral district
- Legislature: Newfoundland and Labrador House of Assembly
MHA
Elvis Loveless
Liberal
- District created: 1975
- First contested: 1975
- Last contested: 2025

Demographics
- Population (2006): 8,715
- Electors (2011): 6,053

Fortune Bay—Cape La Hune is a provincial electoral district for the House of Assembly of Newfoundland and Labrador, Canada. When created in 1975 it was called Fortune-Hermitage. In 2011, there were 6,053 eligible voters living within the district.

The district covers a larger section of Newfoundland's south coast. The district includes territory east of Burgeo, and stretches to the end of Fortune Bay near the beginning of the Burin Peninsula.

The district covers a number of communities including: Harbour Breton, Seal Cove, and Hermitage-Sandyville in Connaigre; St. Albans, Milltown-Head of Bay d'Espoir, Morrisville, St. Joseph's Cove, and St. Veronica's in Bay d'Espoir; along with Belleoram, Pool's Cove, and St. Jacques-Coomb's Cove (St. Jacques, English Harbour West, Mose Ambrose, Boxey, Coomb's Cove, and Wreck Cove) in Fortune Bay.

The Miawpukek First Nation reserve of Samiajij Miawpukek (Conne River) in Bay d'Espoir is located in the district.

The district contains intra-provincial ferries servicing Rencontre East, Gaultois, and McCallum. Francois, another isolated community in the district, can also be accessed via McCallum through the Francois – Grey River – Burgeo ferry route.

== Members of the House of Assembly ==
Assembly	Years	Member	Party
Fortune - Hermitage
37th	1975–1979	Jack Winsor	Liberal
38th	1979–1982	Don Stewart	Progressive Conservative
39th	1982–1985	Don Stewart	Progressive Conservative
40th	1985–1989	Roger Simmons	Liberal
41st	1989–1993	Oliver Langdon	Progressive Conservative
42nd	1993–1996	Oliver Langdon	Liberal
Fortune Bay - Cape la Hune
43rd	1996–1999	Oliver Langdon	Liberal
44th	1999–2003	Oliver Langdon	Liberal
45th	2003–2007	Oliver Langdon	Liberal
46th	2007–2011	Tracey Perry	Progressive Conservative
47th	2011–2015	Tracey Perry	Progressive Conservative
48th	2015–2019	Tracey Perry	Progressive Conservative
49th	2019–2021	Elvis Loveless	Liberal
50th	2021–2025	Elvis Loveless	Liberal
51st	2025–present	Elvis Loveless	Liberal

=== Former District of Hermitage ===
Assembly	Years	Member	Party
33rd	1962–1966	John Cheeseman	Liberal
34th	1966–1971	Abel Wornell	Liberal
35th	1971	Harold Piercey	Liberal
36th	1972–1975	Roy L. Cheeseman	Progressive Conservative

=== Former District of Fortune/Fortune Bay ===
Assembly	Years	Member	Party
33rd	1962–1966	H.R.V. Earle	Liberal
34th	1966–1971	H.R.V. Earle	Liberal
35th	1971	Augustus Oldford	Liberal
36th	1972–1975	H.R.V. Earle	Progressive Conservative

=== Former District of Fortune Bay - Hermitage/Fortune and Hermitage ===
Assembly	Years	Member	Party
29th	1949–1951	John R. Courage	Liberal
30th	1951–1956	John R. Courage	Liberal
31st	1956–1959	John R. Courage	Liberal
32nd	1959–1962	John R. Courage	Liberal

== Election results ==
Graph of election results (minor parties that never got 2% of the vote or did not run consistently are omitted) View source data.

2025 Newfoundland and Labrador general election
Party	Candidate	Votes	%	±%
Liberal	Elvis Loveless	1,842	65.95	-2.27
Progressive Conservative	Ada John	903	32.33	+3.81
New Democratic	Eamon Carew	48	1.72	-1.53
Total valid votes		2,793		
Total rejected ballots				
Turnout				
Eligible voters				
Liberal hold		Swing		-3.04

2021 Newfoundland and Labrador general election
Party	Candidate	Votes	%	±%
Liberal	Elvis Loveless	1,868	68.22	+14.84
Progressive Conservative	Charlene Walsh	781	28.52	-18.09
New Democratic	Noel Joe	89	3.25	
Total valid votes		2,738	99.71	
Total rejected ballots		8	0.29	
Turnout		2,746	50.99	
Eligible voters		5,385		
Liberal hold		Swing		+16.47
Source(s) "Officially Nominated Candidates General Election 2021" (PDF). Elections Newfoundland and Labrador. "NL Election 2021 (Unofficial Results)".

2019 Newfoundland and Labrador general election
Party	Candidate	Votes	%	±%
Liberal	Elvis Loveless	1,759	53.38	+15.74
Progressive Conservative	Charlene Walsh	1,536	46.62	-2.42
Total valid votes		3,295	99.49	
Total rejected ballots		17	0.51	+0.19
Turnout		3,312	62.00	-5.61
Eligible voters		5,342		
Liberal gain from Progressive Conservative		Swing		+9.08

2015 Newfoundland and Labrador general election
Party	Candidate	Votes	%	±%
Progressive Conservative	Tracey Perry	1,830	49.04	-18.24
Liberal	Bill Carter	1,405	37.65	+22.18
New Democratic	Mildred Skinner	497	13.32	-3.94
Total valid votes		6,732	99.68	
Total rejected ballots		12	0.32	+0.01
Turnout		3,744	67.61	+4.15
Eligible voters		5,538		
Progressive Conservative hold		Swing		-20.21

2011 Newfoundland and Labrador general election
Party	Candidate	Votes	%	±%
Progressive Conservative	Tracey Perry	2,592	67.27	+4.08
New Democratic	Susan Skinner	665	17.26	+15.17
Liberal	Eric Skinner	596	15.47	-19.25
Total valid votes		3,853	99.69	
Total rejected ballots		12	0.31	
Turnout		3,865	63.45	
Eligible voters		6,091		

2007 Newfoundland and Labrador general election
Party	Candidate	Votes	%	±%
Progressive Conservative	Tracey Perry	2,539	63.19%	–
Liberal	Elvis Loveless	1,395	34.72%	
NDP	Sheldon Hynes	84	2.09%	

2003 Newfoundland and Labrador general election
Party	Candidate	Votes	%	±%
Liberal	Oliver Langdon	2,880	58.79%	
Progressive Conservative	Andrew Colford	2,019	41.21%	–

1999 Newfoundland and Labrador general election
Party	Candidate	Votes	%	±%
Liberal	Oliver Langdon	3,189	69.9%	
Progressive Conservative	Bob Baker	1,353	29.7%	–

== See also ==
- List of Newfoundland and Labrador provincial electoral districts
- Canadian provincial electoral districts
