= Newfoundland and Labrador Route 363 =

Highway in Newfoundland and Labrador, Canada

Route 363
- Coomb's Cove Road

Route information
- Maintained by Newfoundland and Labrador Department of Transportation and Infrastructure
- Length: 18.4 km (11.4 mi)

Major junctions
- West end: Coomb's Cove
- East end: Route 362 near English Harbour West

Location
- Country: Canada
- Province: Newfoundland and Labrador

Highway system
- Highways in Newfoundland and Labrador
← Route 362	→ Route 364

Route 363, also known as Coomb's Cove Road, is a 18.4-kilometre-long (11.4 mi) east–west highway on the Connaigre Peninsula of the island of Newfoundland. It is located entirely with the town of St. Jacques-Coomb's Cove, connecting the communities on the western half of town with Route 362 (Belleoram Road).

Cell phone reception along Route 363 is severely limited.

== Route description ==
Route 363 begins at a fork in the road in Coomb's Cove and winds its way east along the coastline of Fortune Bay to have an intersection with a local road leading to Wreck Cove. The highway has an intersection with a road leading to Boxey before passing through Mose Ambrose and English Harbour West. Route 363 now winds its way inland through hilly terrain for several kilometres before coming to an end at an intersection with Route 362.

== Major intersections ==
Location	km	mi	Destinations	Notes
Coomb's Cove	0.0	0.0	Fork in the road at the northern end of town	Western terminus
	2.9	1.8	Wreck Cove Road (Route 363-15) - Wreck Cove	
	6.7	4.2	Boxey Road (Route 363-13) - Boxey	
English Harbour West	13.4	8.3	Ocean Drive (Route 363-10) - Downtown	
	18.4	11.4	Route 362 (Belleoram Road) to Route 360 – St. Jacques, Belleoram, Pool's Cove	Eastern terminus; access to Route 1 (TCH) via Route 360
1.000 mi = 1.609 km; 1.000 km = 0.621 mi
