= Jemmy's Cove, Newfoundland and Labrador =

Abandoned town in Canada

Jemmy's Cove
- Abandoned Town
- Location of Jemmy's Cove in Newfoundland
- Coordinates: 47°36′26.9″N 54°56′45.3″W
- Country: Canada
- Province: Newfoundland and Labrador
- Census division: Division 2
- Census subdivision: Division 2

Population (1911)
  - Total: 6
- Time zone: UTC– 3:30 (Newfoundland Time)
  - Summer (DST): UTC– 2:30 (Newfoundland Daylight)
- Area code: 709
- Bay: Fortune Bay

Jemmy's Cove (sometimes Jim's Cove or Jimmy's Cove) is a tiny abandoned town located near New Harbour, Fortune Bay in Newfoundland and Labrador, Canada that had a peak population of 6 in 1911.

== History ==
Located near the abandoned community of New Harbour, Fortune Bay in Fortune Bay, Jemmy's Cove residents were primarily fishermen of the Church of England faith. The family of John Fudge are believed to have been the first settlers who first appear there in 1890. By the turn of the 20th century, a family of Keepings joined them.

== Demographics ==
Jemmy's Cove Population By Year
1891 Census	6
1901 Census	6
1911 Census	6

== See also ==
- New Harbour, Fortune Bay
- Trammer, Newfoundland and Labrador
- Femme, Newfoundland and Labrador
