= New Harbour, Fortune Bay =

New Harbour
- Abandoned Town
- Location of New Harbour in Newfoundland
- Coordinates: 47°36′09.8″N 54°57′49.8″W
- Country: Canada
- Province: Newfoundland and Labrador
- Census division: Division 2
- Census subdivision: Division 2

Population (1945)
  - Total: 24
- Time zone: UTC– 3:30 (Newfoundland Time)
  - Summer (DST): UTC– 2:30 (Newfoundland Daylight)
- Area code: 709
- Bay: Fortune Bay

New Harbour is an abandoned town located within Fortune Bay in Newfoundland and Labrador, Canada that had a peak population of 24 in 1945. It is not to be confused with New Harbour, Trinity Bay and New Harbour on the south-west coast of Newfoundland.

== History ==
Located near the resettled community of Femme in Fortune Bay, Trammer was first settled in the early to mid 19 century and was first recorded in the Newfoundland census of 1857 where one settler had been born in England. By 1869, there were 19 residents, with the surnames Matthews, Pauls and Rideout. At that time, residents of the small community would only receive their mail every two weeks from the main Fortune Bay economic hub of Harbour Breton. People of the community relied heavily on the herring fishery which was a prosperous venture in the mid to late 19th century in this area. The population held relatively steady into the 1880s where all residents were reported as being 'Newfoundland-born.' With the decline of the Bait fishery, both due to the collapse of the herring stocks and the controversial Bait Act that restricted Newfoundland fishermen from selling bait to American and French buyers, residents began to rely on the cod fishery. By the turn of the 20th century, the population had dramatically decreased to just six people. The community was revived shortly thereafter by a family of Wells from Bay L'Argent across Fortune Bay who made their home in vacated homesteads. By 1945, four Wells families and one Pardy family lived in the harbour, in what would be its peak population of 24. The community was abandoned in the mid-20th century.

== Demographics ==
New Harbour Population By Year
1857 Census	3
1869 Census	19
1871 Business Directory	20
1884 Census	19
1891 Census	15
1901 Census	3
1935 Census	10
1945 Census	24

== See also ==
- Trammer, Newfoundland and Labrador
- Femme, Newfoundland and Labrador
