= Newfoundland and Labrador Route 362 =

Highway in Newfoundland and Labrador, Canada

Route 362
- Belleoram Road

Route information
- Maintained by Newfoundland and Labrador Department of Transportation and Infrastructure
- Length: 35.5 km (22.1 mi)

Major junctions
- North end: Route 360 near Pool's Cove
- Route 363 near English Harbour West
- South end: Belleoram

Location
- Country: Canada
- Province: Newfoundland and Labrador

Highway system
- Highways in Newfoundland and Labrador
← Route 361	→ Route 363

Route 362, also known as Belleoram Road, is a 35.5-kilometre-long (22.1 mi) north-south highway on the Connaigre Peninsula of the island of Newfoundland. It connects the communities along the western side of Fortune Bay with Route 360 (Bay d'Espoir Highway). Cell phone reception along Route 362 is severely limited.

== Route description ==
Route 362 begins at an intersection with Route 360 several kilometres northwest of Pool's Cove. It heads south through very hilly and rural terrain for over 20 kilometres, where it has an intersection with a local road leading into the town. The highway then enters the town of St. Jacques-Coomb's Cove and comes to an intersection with Route 363 (Coomb's Cove Road) just northeast of English Harbour West. The highway now winds its way east to pass through St. Jacques before turning north to leave town and wind its way along the coastline. Route 362 now enters Belleoram and comes to an end in downtown at an intersection with Bayview Drive.

== Major intersections ==
Location	km	mi	Destinations	Notes
	0.0	0.0	Route 360 (Bay d'Espoir Highway) to Route 1 (TCH) – Bishop's Falls, Hermitage, Harbour Breton	Northern terminus
	7.8	4.8	Pool's Cove Road (Route 362-10) - Pool's Cove	Provides access to Rencontre East passenger-service Ferry
	27.6	17.1	Route 363 west (Coomb's Cove Road) – Coomb's Cove, English Harbour West	Eastern terminus of Route 363
Belleoram	35.5	22.1	Bayview Drive	Southern terminus
1.000 mi = 1.609 km; 1.000 km = 0.621 mi
