= Connaigre Peninsula =

Peninsula in Newfoundland and Labrador, Canada

Coordinates: 47°34′N 55°40′W

Location of Connaigre Peninsula in Newfoundland

The Connaigre Peninsula is a Canadian peninsula located on the south coast of the island of Newfoundland in the province of Newfoundland and Labrador. Harbour Breton is the largest population centre on the peninsula.

The Connaigre Peninsula is triangular shaped, separating Bay d'Espoir on the western side and Belle Bay along with Fortune Bay on the east. The peninsula takes its name from the small fishing community of Connaigre that was resettled in 1954 under the Centralization Programme by the Newfoundland government.

Route 360 extends the length of the Peninsula starting near Bishop's Falls and ending at Harbour Breton.

Route 362 extends from Route 360 to communities such as Belleoram and St. Jacques-Coomb's Cove (St. Jacques, English Harbour West, Mose Ambrose, Boxey, Coomb's Cove, and Wreck Cove). Pool's Cove has road access via the 8.1-kilometre-long (5.0 mi) Pool's Cove Road, connecting the town with Route 362.

Route 364 extends from Route 360 to communities such as Hermitage-Sandyville, Dawson's Cove, Seal Cove and Pass Island.

A daily ferry service from Hermitage travels to the isolated outports of Gaultois and McCallum. Rencontre East, another isolated community, is accessible by a ferry port in Pool's Cove on the Connaigre Peninsula and travels to Bay L'Argent on the Burin Peninsula via Rencontre East.
