= Frenchman's Cove =

Frenchman's Cove may refer to several geographical places.

Australia

- The old name of La Perouse, New South Wales, a suburb of Sydney.

Canada

- Frenchman's Cove, Newfoundland and Labrador, a town on Burin Peninsula, Canada.
  - Frenchman's Cove Provincial Park, on Burin Peninsula in Newfoundland and Labrador, Canada.
- a community in Humber Arm South, Newfoundland and Labrador, Canada.

Jamaica

- Frenchman's Cove Resort, Jamaica.
