= Newfoundland and Labrador Route 212 =

Highway in Newfoundland and Labrador

Route 212
- Bay L'Argent Road

Route information
- Maintained by Newfoundland and Labrador Department of Transportation and Infrastructure
- Length: 30.2 km (18.8 mi)

Major junctions
- South end: Route 210 near St. Bernard's-Jacques Fontaine
- North end: Harbour Mille

Location
- Country: Canada
- Province: Newfoundland and Labrador

Highway system
- Highways in Newfoundland and Labrador
← Route 211	→ Route 213

Route 212, also known as Bay L’Argent Road, is a 30.2-kilometre-long (18.8 mi) north–south highway on the Burin Peninsula of the island of Newfoundland in the Canadian province of Newfoundland and Labrador. It connects several communities along the northeastern corner of Fortune Bay with Route 210 (Heritage Run/Burin Peninsula Highway).

== Route description ==
Route 212 begins southeast of St. Bernard's-Jacques Fontaine at an intersection with Route 210 and heads northwest through wooded and hilly terrain for several kilometres to pass through the Jacques Fontaine portion of town. It now winds its way northeast along the coastline to pass through Bay L'Argent, where one can access a Ferry to Rencontre East, and then Little Bay East. The highway now becomes very curvy and winding as it heads through hilly terrain for the next several kilometres to pass through Little Harbour East. Route 212 now enters Harbour Mille comes to an end shortly thereafter in the centre of town.

== Major intersections ==
Location	km	mi	Destinations	Notes
	0.0	0.0	Route 210 (Burin Peninsula Highway/Heritage Run) – Swift Current, Marystown, Grand Bank	Southern terminus
Jacques Fontaine	9.9	6.2	Main Road - St. Bernard's	
Bay L'Argent	13.7	8.5	Back Cove Beach Road - Downtown, Harbour, Rencontre East Ferry	
Little Bay East	16.8	10.4	Main Road - Downtown, Harbour	
Harbour Mille	30.2	18.8	Dead End at town's harbour	Northern terminus
1.000 mi = 1.609 km; 1.000 km = 0.621 mi
