= Simani =

Musical duo from Newfoundland, Canada

- Origin: Belleoram, Newfoundland and Labrador, Canada
- Genres: Newfoundland, folk, country
- Years active: 1977–1997
- Labels: SWC Records
- Members: Sim Savory; Bud Davidge

Simani (pronounced "Sim 'n' I") was a Newfoundland and Labrador musical duet considered the cornerstone of traditional Newfoundland music. Formed in 1977 by Bud Davidge and Sim Savory (November 29, 1946 – March 16, 2010), in Belleoram, Fortune Bay, their music keeps Newfoundland's unique heritage alive by putting old stories to song and by their recording of local jigs and reels. Their music is characterized by the folksy sound of their native province, including Celtic, English, and French influences.

It is believed that the name "Simani" is derived from someone asking Davidge who was playing that night at the local Legion, Davidge replied, "Sim and I". By the time the music began that night, the name was already set.

== History ==
Davidge and Savory both knew each other growing up - Savory was in Belleoram and Davidge was in nearby Bay du Nord. Savory was a natural and gifted musician and was always playing in bands. In 1970, after living and working in St. John's for some time, Savory moved back to Belleoram. Davidge was working with the school board at that time. A few years after that, which was a time when Savory wasn't in a band, they got together and decided to play a few tunes. One thing led to another, and in May 1977, they decided to play a gig in Belleoram at an old fisherman's lodge called The Schooner Lounge. The gig earned them about $20. Both critics and the general public enjoyed the bands so much that they decided to play more gigs. In 1981, four years after that initial performance in Belleoram, Davidge and Savory had written enough material that it was suggested the duo record an album, which they eventually did in Stephenville.

Nearly all of Simani's recorded songs are originals, written by Davidge (who was also the vocalist for the group). Savory was a gifted musician, being a master of many instruments, as well as a very talented sound engineer. That variety of talent worked very well for Simani, and it showed in the quality of their recordings.

In a musical career that lasted 20 years, Simani were stars with major radio airplay and sold-out shows wherever they performed. Since their first recording "Saltwater Cowboys" in 1981, they have produced 12 recordings. Simani defined a sound that became predominant in many recording that were done in Newfoundland and Labrador in the 1980s. Their first few albums were recorded at Clode Sound in Stephenville and the remainder recorded at Sim's studio in Belleoram.

Simani is famous for their "Saltwater Cowboys" song. The song is about outward migration (a subject most people from Newfoundland are all too familiar with), and the effects that an outside culture has on Newfoundlanders who leave and then return home.

Simani is also well known for their Christmas mega-hit "Any Mummers Allowed In?" (commonly referred to as "The Mummer's Song"). Before Davidge and Savory produced this song, the Christmas tradition of Mummering was declining. After its release in 1984, Mummering made a return to all parts of Newfoundland.

=== Later years ===
Simani gave up touring in 1997. However, Davidge and Savory still worked toward the advancement of traditional Newfoundland music, with both men recording projects individually. On March 16, 2010, Savory died after battling a lengthy illness. Despite the deterioration of his health, Savory spent the last few months of his life working in the music industry in Newfoundland that he helped redefine.

Prior to his death, Savory would help aspiring artists with their recording experience at his state of the art recording facility in Belleoram.

Davidge was later the owner and operator of a cassette tape and CD-ROM duplication facility at English Harbour West, just eight kilometers from Belleoram. Davidge was elected to the Memorial University Board of Regents as an alumni representative in 2017.

== Awards ==
- 2002 - the band was awarded the Stompin' Tom Award at the East Coast Music Awards.
- 2008 - the band won a Lifetime Achievement Award at the MusicNL award show in Gander, NL.
- 2024 - Davidge was made a Member of the Order of Newfoundland and Labrador.

== Discography ==
Date	Album
1981	Saltwater Cowboys
1982	Heaven By Sea
1985	Christmas Fancy
1985	Outport People
1986	Two for the Show
1987	Music and Friends
1990	Chapel Walls
1991	Some Things I Cherish
1992	Home and Native Land
1993	Ooh! Christmas Tree
1994	Promises
1997	Ye Can't Have Joe Smallwood... and Ye Can't Have John Cabot
2008	Favourites
2012	Outport & Sea
2014	The Country Side Of
2015	The Instrumental Side
