= Music and Friends =

Music and Friends may refer to:

- Music and Friends (Simani album), 1987
- Music and Friends (Walter Ostanek album), 1994
- Music & Friends (Cafêzz album), 2014
