= Newfoundland and Labrador Route 213 =

Highway in Newfoundland and Labrador, Canada

Route 213
- Garnish Road

Route information
- Maintained by Newfoundland and Labrador Department of Transportation and Infrastructure
- Length: 12 km (7.5 mi)

Major junctions
- West end: Route 210 near Frenchman's Cove
- East end: Route 210 near Garnish

Location
- Country: Canada
- Province: Newfoundland and Labrador

Highway system
- Highways in Newfoundland and Labrador
| ← Route 212 | → Route 214 |

Route 213 is a highway on the Burin Peninsula of the island of Newfoundland in the Canadian province of Newfoundland and Labrador. It is one of a small number of provincial routes that start and end on the same highway (in this case, Route 210). It is a very short route, running for about 12 kilometres. Due to being a rough road, the maximum speed limit is 60 km/h, except through communities where the speed limit is reduced to 30 km/h. The western side of the route allows for a drive along the shore of Fortune Bay, until reaching the community of Frenchman's Cove (not to be confused with the West Coast community of the same name). Midway along the route is Frenchman's Cove Provincial Park, one of only a small number of provincial parks in existence since 1997. After exiting Frenchman's Cove, motorists travel along the Frenchman's Cove Barasway and enjoy more of a view of Fortune Bay until approaching the Town of Garnish.

== Attractions along Route 213 ==
- Frenchman's Cove Provincial Park
- Frenchman's Cove Barasway

== Major intersections ==
| Location | km | mi | Destinations | Notes |
|---|---|---|---|---|
| | 0.0 | 0.0 | Route 210 (Burin Peninsula Highway/Heritage Run) to Route 1 (TCH) – Marystown, Grand Bank, Fortune | Western terminus |
| Frenchman's Cove | 3.8 | 2.4 | Main Road - Harbour | |
| Frenchman's Cove | 4.1– 4.2 | 2.5– 2.6 | Frenchman's Cove Provincial Park main entrance | Access road into park |
| Garnish | 7.6 | 4.7 | Seaview Drive - Harbour | |
| | 12.0 | 7.5 | Route 210 (Burin Peninsula Highway/Heritage Run) to Route 1 (TCH) – Marystown, Burin, Grand Bank | Eastern terminus |
1.000 mi = 1.609 km; 1.000 km = 0.621 mi
