= Grande Meadows Golf Club =

Coordinates: 47°12′29.49″N 55°24′28.46″W

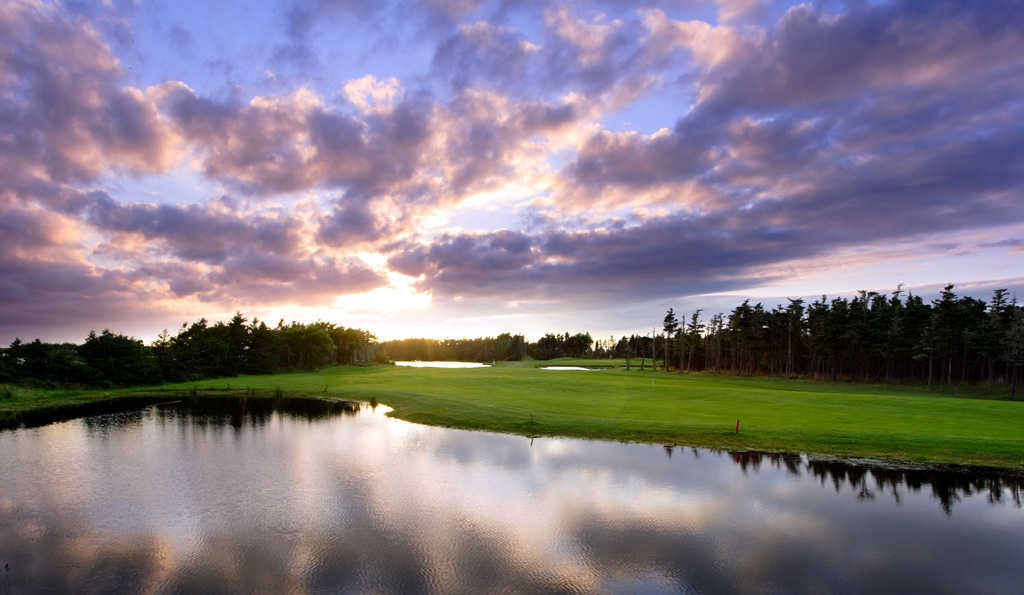
- Interactive map of Grande Meadows Golf Club

Club information
- Location: Frenchman's Cove, Newfoundland, Canada
- Established: 1995
- Type: Public
- Tota holes: 9
- Website: www.grandemeadows.ca
- Designed by: Robert Heaslip
- Par: 71
- Length: 2944 yards
- Course rating: 126

Grande Meadows Golf Club is a public golf course located in Frenchman's Cove, Newfoundland, Canada.

== History ==
Grande Meadows Golf Club, located on the north side of Burin Peninsula facing Fortune Bay, is the most southerly course in the province. The 9-hole course was designed by Robert Heaslip, who also undertook construction supervision. The course is built on a peninsula of level land with the Great Garnish Barasway bordering five holes around the perimeter; ponds and marshland come into play on at least two more holes.

== See also ==
- List of golf courses in Newfoundland and Labrador
