= St. Jacques-Coomb's Cove =

- Town
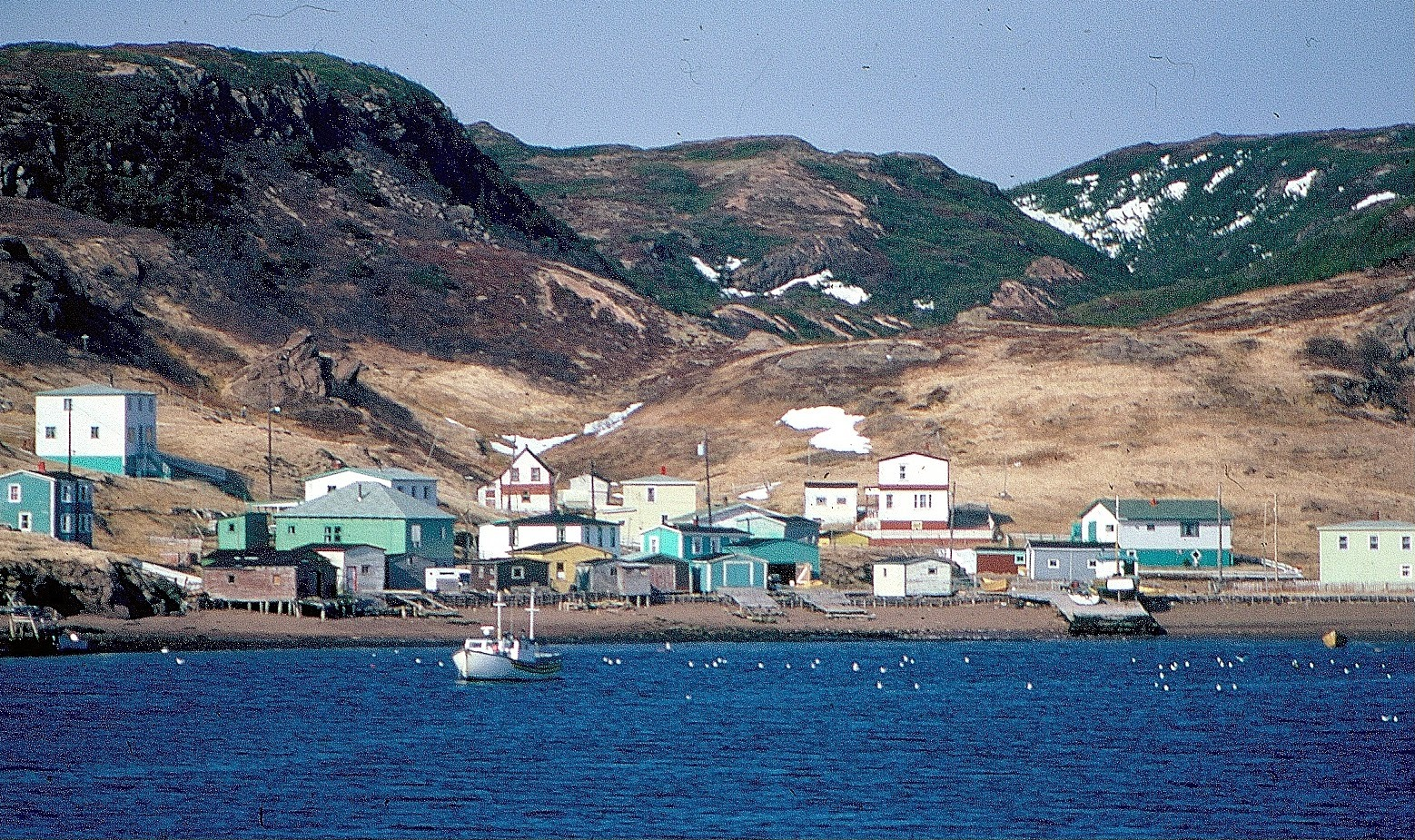
- St. Jacques-Coomb's Cove in the 1980s
- Interactive map of St. Jacques-Coomb's Cove
- Coordinates: 47°28′15″N 55°32′31″W
- Country: Canada
- Province: Newfoundland and Labrador

Population (2021)
  - Total: 546
- Time zone: UTC-3:30 (Newfoundland Time)
  - Summer (DST): UTC-2:30 (Newfoundland Daylight)
- Area code: 709
- Highways: Route 362; Route 363

St. Jacques-Coomb's Cove is a town in the Canadian province of Newfoundland and Labrador. The town had a population of 546 in the Canada 2021 Census. The community is located on the south coast of the island of Newfoundland on the north side of Fortune Bay, on the southern tip of the Connaigre Peninsula in what is now known as the Coast of Bays Region. The town consists of six amalgamated communities, St. Jacques, English Harbour West, Mose Ambrose, Boxey, Coomb's Cove, and Wreck Cove, all nestled within the inlets along the coast. These areas all had their beginnings in the fisheries and the fisheries have always been the mainstay of employment in the communities. In recent years aquaculture was introduced in the area, providing employment for its residents. The town is approximately 215 kilometres (134 mi) southeast of Grand Falls-Windsor.

The six communities were incorporated into the single town of St. Jacques-Coomb's Cove in 1972. The community is 70km Northeast of Harbour Breton.

== Demographics ==
In the 2021 Census of Population conducted by Statistics Canada, St. Jacques-Coomb's Cove had a population of 546 living in 242 of its 287 total private dwellings, a change of −7.1% from its 2016 population of 588. With a land area of 81.89 km^{2} (31.62 sq mi), it had a population density of 6.7/km^{2} (17.3/sq mi) in 2021.

== See also ==
- Connaigre Peninsula
- Newfoundland outport
