= St. Bernard's-Jacques Fontaine =

St. Bernard's-Jacques Fontaine Fox Cove
- Town
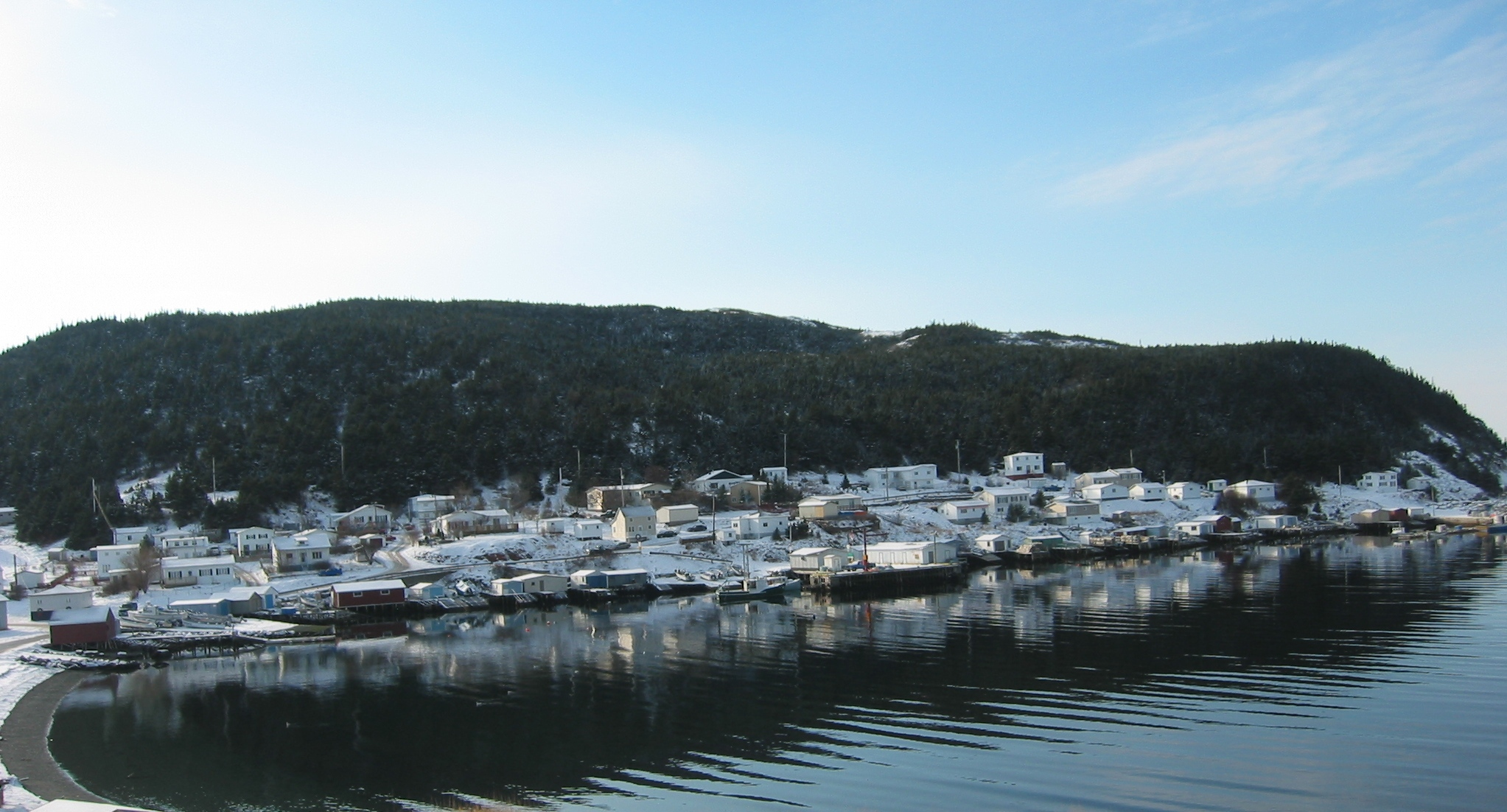
- Bank Road, or simply known to locals as "the Bank".

- Location of St. Bernard's-Jacques Fontaine in Newfoundland
- Coordinates: 47°31′35.90″N 54°56′35.90″W
- Country: Canada
- Province: Newfoundland and Labrador
- Settled: Early 1800s
- Incorporated (town): 1967
- Amalgamated: 1994

Government
  - Mayor: Barry Hodder
  - MHA: Paul Pike (Liberal)
  - MP: Jonathan Rowe (CON), Terra Nova—The Peninsulas

Area
  - Total: 16.44 km^{2} (6.35 sq mi)
- Elevation: 37 m (121 ft)

Population (2021)
  - Total: 433
  - Density: 28.6/km^{2} (74/sq mi)
- Time zone: UTC-3:30 (Newfoundland Time)
  - Summer (DST): UTC-2:30 (Newfoundland Daylight)
- Postal code: A0E 2T0
- Area code: 709
- Telephone Exchange: 461 Bell Aliant; 373 Eastlink
- Highways: Route 212

St. Bernard's-Jacques Fontaine is a town in the Canadian province of Newfoundland and Labrador. The town had a population of 433 in the Canada 2021 Census, a drop from 470 in 2011.

== History ==
The town of St. Bernard's-Jacques Fontaine was amalgamated in 1994 from two small fishing communities.

=== St. Bernard's ===
Incorporated as a town in 1967, the community was known as Fox Cove until 1915. The name was changed to differentiate it from two other communities with the same name. St. Bernard's appears to have been settled in the early 19th century by the Johnson, Stewart and Whelan families. These were primarily Anglican fishermen and as with many Newfoundland communities, as Roman Catholic fishermen began to settle there the populations diverged. St. Bernard's became predominantly Roman Catholic, while the nearby communities of Jacques Fontaine and Bay L'Argent became predominantly Anglican.

=== Jacques Fontaine ===
Incorporated as a town in 1986, this small fishing community is located near the base of the Burin Peninsula on the east side of Fortune Bay approximately 3 km east of Bay L'Argent. The origin of the name is uncertain, perhaps deriving from an early French settler, although it appears on many early maps as Jack (or Jack's) Fontaine.

Earliest known mention of the location is by James Cook during his survey of Newfoundland on July 16, 1765, he recorded in his log: "At 7PM anchored with the best bower in a bight called Jack Fountain, in 10 fathoms water and moored with the small anchor and hawser. At noon weighed and came to sail."

The earliest known settler was a Reuben Buffett. Two of his children were born at Jack Fontaine according to the Grand Bank Methodist Church Records. Charlotte was born 19 December 1819 and Ambrose was born 21 Nov 1823.

The first recorded census in 1863 labels the community as Tank Fontaine with a population of 33 residents. In 1935, there were 125 residents, noting the most common family names as Johnson, Pardy, Allen, Harris and Brushett. In the early 1980s, the population of Jacques Fontaine reached 200, most people finding employment in the inshore and long liner fisheries.

== Demographics ==
In the 2021 Census of Population conducted by Statistics Canada, St. Bernard's-Jacques Fontaine had a population of 433 living in 201 of its 225 total private dwellings, a change of 0% from its 2016 population of 433. With a land area of 16.08 km^{2} (6.21 sq mi), it had a population density of 26.9/km^{2} (69.7/sq mi) in 2021.

== See also ==
- List of cities and towns in Newfoundland and Labrador
