= Hoop Cove =

Coordinates: 47°38′00″N 55°06′00″W

Hoop Cove was a small locality located northeast of Belleoram. Like nearby Anderson's Cove, it was 'resettled' unlike other nearby former settlements such as Femme and Trammer whose largely family population dwindled away to nothing.

== See also ==
- List of ghost towns in Newfoundland and Labrador
