= Cafêzz =

Puerto Rican band

Cafêzz is a Caribbean / world / jazz / fusion band formed in San Juan, Puerto Rico during the summer of 2014.

== Style ==
Reminiscent of the intricate process of coffee roasting, which involves fusing different countries' beans into a perfect blend to create delicious beverages, Cafêzz seeks to hand over diverse sound impressions to the listener. The band's style is very eclectic, embracing a wide array of Caribbean, Brazilian, Latin, jazz, funk, rock, folk and classical influences.

Shortly after being formed, the band has performed alongside top musicians like David Sánchez, Humberto Ramírez, Luis Perico Ortíz, Ricardo Pons, and Oskar Cartaya, and has played at the Puerto Rico Jazz Jam, Carolina International Jazz Festival, Heineken's Ventana al Jazz, and Inter Metro Jazz Festival, among others. Recently, Cafêzz visited and performed in Los Angeles, Dazzle Jazz Club in Denver, Orlando, Miami, Tampa, Mount Dora, and Minneapolis in the U.S.; Laudio in Basque Country, Barcelona, Granada and Madrid in Spain; Medellín in Colombia; and will continue travelling overseas in the upcoming months.

“Cafêzz” is, in fact, the combination of the words "café" (coffee in Spanish) and jazz, and it captures their notion that a customary coffee moment could also be an occasion to share music with friends. Their original music presents an ample melodic content combined with tasty rhythms, giving the listener rich aural textures to enjoy with ease. Even though it includes elements from jazz, its performance is not focused on individual instrument virtuosity, but relies on the ensemble's communication and interaction.

== History ==
Cafêzz was formed in San Juan, Puerto Rico during the summer of 2014 by pianist Carmen Noemí and bassist Edgardo "Egui" Sierra, after completion and release of their Music & Friends CD. Their first formal performance was on August 13, 2014, during the Music & Friends release party at Downtown Bar & Grill in Hato Rey, Puerto Rico. The live concert featured 16 musicians who had participated in the recording process, plus several special guests.

The lineup was as follows: Ricardo Pons, Pedro Rivera Toledo, Norberto "Tiko" Ortiz, José Roberto Jiménez, Roberto Bermúdez, Osvaldo López, Raúl Maldonado, Arnaldo Rivera, Danny Lloret, Christian Galíndez, Mónica Nieves, Ariana González, Marlene Grafals, Lianir Vales, Marielys Aldarondo and Angélica Kolsan. Special guests were Brenda Hopkins, Samuel Morales and Bernie Williams, plus bandladers Carmen Noemí and Edgardo Sierra.

Following Downtown's presentation the group adopted several formats. The trio's interplay included drummer Freddie Burgos, and made it easy to add Christian Galíndez on “latin percussion” (quartet), Norberto "Tiko" Ortíz on saxophone (Cafêzz Quintet); and Waldemar Reyes on “ethnic percussion” (sextet format).

== Performances ==
Following Cafêzz’ successful debut, the group became quite popular and was invited to perform in many revered venues. On September 15, 2014, the quintet performed at the Inter Metro Jazz Festival with local guitarist Jorge Laboy collaborating on several pieces, including "Espresso Jam".

In the next weeks, they were invited to play at the "Hispanic Festival" at Paseo la Princesa, Old San Juan, PR (October), and at the "Ibero American Educational Research Congress" at the Sheraton Hotel, San Juan, PR (November).

On December 28, Cafêzz performed before an audience of 13,500 at the “Heineken Ventana al Jazz” festival, and shared the stage with acclaimed bassist Oskar Cartaya and local distinguished trumpeter Humberto Ramírez.

On August 8, 2015, Cafêzz performed at the "Carolina International Jazz Fest”, and shared the stage with some of the finest jazz performers like prestigious trumpeter Luis "Perico" Ortíz, prominent saxophonist Ricardo Pons and David Sánchez (musician) Grammy award-winner saxophonist.

The ensemble was invited to perform at "Jazz en la Inter Metro" Festival on April 26, 2016, and presented a new repertoire from their second album, "Sol Boricua", featuring an extended 11 piece group.

On June 26, 2016, Cafêzz performed at the 8th anniversary celebration of "Heineken's Ventana al Jazz" festival at the scenic "Bahía Urbana" music venue. Other performances on 2016 includes: SOFO Culinary Fest at Old San Juan, “Adoquin Jamming Nights” and Panorama Sky Club.

In January 2017, Cafêzz sextet performed at the prestigious "Puerto Rico Jazz Jam" festival, a two-day event held at the historic "Teatro Tapia" in Old San Juan, an homage to Chano Pozo, Mongo Santamaría and Ray Barreto with percussionists Eddie Montalvo, Jimmie Morales and Kachiro Thompson. On closing night, Cafêzz shared the stage with trumpeter and band leader Humberto Ramírez. Critics raved about the sextet's performance and was reviewed as "Magistral" (masterly performance) by mayor several publications, such as "El Nuevo Día" newspaper and "News Event Media" Magazine.

Early in 2018, the band begins “De Paseo” Tour, their first performance tour in United States and Europe, where they visited a total of 11 cities, including Loa Angeles, CA; Denver, Co; Minneapolis, MN; Tampa, Orlando, Mount Dora and Miami in Florida; Llodio in Basque Country; Barcelona, Granada and Madrid in Spain. Many of the performances took place in renowned jazz venues, such as the prestigious Dazzle Jazz Club in Denver (a sold-out event), the Ice House in Minneapolis and Blue Bamboo in Orlando. As part of the tour, Cafêzz participated in two special concerts, one of them at “Lamuza Parkeko Kasinoak” in Basque Country; the other at the “Modernism Museum of Mount Dora” in Florida.

Although the original plan was to finish the tour by the end of 2018 to focus on the production and release of their third album, an opportunity arose to extend their “De Paseo Tour”. In February 2019, Cafêzz begins a media tour in Colombia, in which they visited 14 television and radio stations and performed in the famed “Victoria Regia” in Medellín, as well as other venues. In addition, Cafêzz have booked several shows in Montreal (Canada) in April 2019; and will perform in Florida, Illinois and Minnesota (United States) on May through June 2019. At the same time, the group will continue working of the recording of their third album, which is planned to be released in the summer of 2019. Cafêzz present discography includes “Music & Friends” (2014©), and “Sol Boricua” (2016©).

== Albums ==
The band's debut album, Music & Friends, was released in 2014 and includes 14 compositions from Puerto Rican pianist Carmen Noemí. The music is organized in two parts, or play lists, and most of the compositions are allusive to coffee themes. The album features guest performers like Latin Grammy nominee Paoli Mejías, Christian Nieves, Ricardo Pons, Pedro Rivera Toledo and Raúl Maldonado. In January 2015, Music & Friends was included on the National Foundation for Popular Culture's Top 20 Outstanding Recordings of 2014 produced in Puerto Rico.

Cafêzz’ second album, Sol Boricua, was released in 2016 with its music aimed at listeners who enjoy the world jazz genre. The album includes 12 new compositions by Carmen Noemí, in a mix of styles intended to please a wide audience. Sol Boricua features guest performers like Latin Grammy nominee Pedro Guzmán, Jorge Laboy, José Roberto Jiménez and Amed Irizarry. In January 2017, Sol Boricua was included on the National Foundation for Popular Culture's Top 20 Outstanding Recordings of 2016 produced in Puerto Rico. It was selected as one of The Best Releases of 2016 by All About Jazz magazine.

== Awards and reviews ==
Sol Boricua was selected as one of "The Best Releases of 2016" by All About Jazz magazine. It was included on National Foundation for Popular Culture's Top 20 Outstanding Recordings of 2016 produced in Puerto Rico.

All About Jazz Magazine -Reviews: "Sol Boricua" Album and "Music & Friends" Album 5 Star Review by James Nadal: -“Carmen Noemí is a cultured lyrical composer… her music is aptly imaginative in an organic sense…a visionary pianist”.

Music & Friends was included on National Foundation for Popular Culture's Top 20 Outstanding Recordings of 2014 produced in Puerto Rico. It was also ranked #55 on iTunes Top 100 World Music Albums of 2014.
