= Fusion Jonda =

Puerto Rican band

Fusion Jonda is a Puerto Rican band that blends Caribbean music with gypsy-flamenco sounds, melodies, and rhythms. The band has centered its music around Afrobeat, jazz, Arabic, and Indian music and has a contemporary approach.

As for the band's name, the word Jonda, a Spanish anachronism for deep, is related to Cante Jondo (in English, Deep Singing), which is the origin of Flamenco. The band is based on flamenco roots, and the "Fusion" comes from the Hispanic, Indian and African harmonies that they inherited in the Caribbean.

== History ==
Fusion Jonda began in 2010 as a trio around its founding members: musician-singer-songwriter, Juan Luis Romero, percussionist, Wilfredo "El Canela" Dávila, and flamenco dancer, Patricia Muñiz. The salsa, rock, and jazz blend had not been unfamiliar to bandleader Romero because of his Puerto Rican and Dominican background. He is part of a family dedicated to music, poetry, journalism, law, and education. He studied piano and music composition at a very young age and dreamed of producing musical interchanges between the rhythms from the Antilles and Latin America. At age 13, he led his first orchestra. He went on to be a member of a variety of bands of different genres including jazz, heavy metal singer, tenor of a Gospel music choir, chorister for the salsa legends Richie Ray & Bobby Cruz, and pianist for several Tropical music bands. He has also been a lawyer since 1990.

Fusion Jonda has evolved from being a flamenco trio to a unique musical ensemble; an array of musicians from different genres like reggae, rock, jazz, and salsa. Combining the sounds of the violin, trumpet, trombone, bass, and percussion. Their goal is to put together their collected inspirations and create a new sound. They have had special appearances by urban poet and rapper Javier "Insurgente" Velázquez. Their live performances contain an element of dance through tribal fusion dancers.

The band achieved its first major break in 2012 when they received an invitation to perform at the José Miguel Agrelot Coliseum alongside Spanish singer, Rosario Flores in front of a crowd of 15,000 during the 50th anniversary of the salsa orchestra El Gran Combo de Puerto Rico.

In 2013, the band released Fusion Jonda, their first self-titled album through their record label New World Latino. The album was recorded in Puerto Rico and mastered at Battery Studios in New York by Mark Wilder. Moreover, the online magazine and website, All About Jazz described Fusion Jonda's album as "...the perfect example of old-world vibe swathed with a new attitude yielding an exuberant production."

In 2014, Fusion Jonda performed the opening acts for Latin Grammy Award winners Concha Buika at the Luis A. Ferré Performing Arts Center in Puerto Rico and for Bajofondo at the Puerto Rico Convention Center.

== Discography ==
- Fusion Jonda

== Band members ==
- Juan Luis Romero – Music director, singer-songwriter, and guitarist
- Nayak Vallejo – Singer
- Javier "Insurgente" Velazquez – Rapper
- Patricia Muniz – Flamenco dancer
- William "Pipo" Torres – Bass player
- Wilfredo "El Canela" Davila – Percussionist
- Henry L. Rodriguez – Percussionist
- Eduardo "Sabu" Rosado – Percussionist
- Guillermo "El Profesor" Peguero – Violinist
- Joey Oyola – Trombonist
- Carlos Hernandez – Trumpet player

== Awards ==
- 2014 – Fusion Jonda's album was selected as one of the 20 best discographic productions in Puerto Rico by the National Foundation for Popular Culture.
