= Sol Boricua =

2016 album by Cafêzz

Studio album by Cafêzz
- Released: 2016
- Producer: Edgardo Sierra

Cafêzz chronology
Music & Friends (2014)	Sol Boricua (2016)

Released in 2016, Sol Boricua is Cafêzz' second album.

== Description ==
James Nadal describes Sol Boricua in All About Jazz Magazine:

"Carmen Noemí, the band's leader, pianist and composer, along with bassist and producer Edgardo Sierra, present an engaging sojourn into the Puerto Rican musical landscape, with a modern point of view. "Sol Boricua," is a salutation to the tropical sun, as the dualistic nature of bomba drumming intertwined with jibaro (mountain music) phrasing on the flute and cuatro, covers the entire tempo of their homeland".

== Track listing ==
All songs composed and arranged by Carmen Noemí (ASCAP)

1. Sol Boricua (5:44) Bomba
2. Te Invito un Café (4:40) "Samba Canção"
3. Barista’s Swing (5:13) Jazz Swing
4. El Cafetal (5:08) Aguinaldo
5. Antes que Salga la Luna (5:40) Classical
6. Cortadito (5:29) “Cuban” Guajira
7. Mayi (5:00) Progressive Rock
8. Desde mi Balcón (5:44) “Peruvian” Waltz
9. Just 4 Funk (6:45) Funk
10. Coffee Lovers (6:10) New Age
11. Café no Céu (5:34) Brazilian Rhythms
12. Mujer de la Alborada (4:28) Danza

== Personnel ==
=== Musicians ===
- Carmen Noemí – Acoustic and Electric Pianos and Synthesizers
- Edgardo “Egui” Sierra – Fretted, Fretless and Piccolo Basses, Navarro Pickups and Basses
- Pedro Guzmán – Puerto Rican Cuatro
- José Roberto Jiménez – Flute and Tenor Saxophone
- Christian Galíndez – Latin Percussion, Bongos, Congas and Bomba Barrels
- Waldemar Reyes – Brazilian and Ethnic Percussion
- Norberto “Tiko” Ortiz – Tenor Saxophone
- Luis Amed Irizarry – Oboe
- Jorge Laboy – Electric Guitar
- Joel Torres – Guitar
- Bryan Muñoz – Acoustic Guitar
- Edgardo Sierra Jr. – Alto Saxophone

=== Engineering ===
- Music Producer: Edgardo “Egui” Sierra
- Recording & Mixing Engineer: Edgardo “Egui” Sierra
- Mastering Engineer: David Rodríguez @ Digital Recording Services

=== Recorded at ===
- EdS Music Recording – Bayamón, Puerto Rico
- Inter Metro Recording Studio, San Juan, Puerto Rico

=== Additional recording ===
- JL Recording Studio Recording Engineer: Jorge Laboy
- Pasillo Sonoro Studio Recording Engineer: Harold Wendell

== Reviews and articles ==
- All About Jazz Magazine – 4.5 Star Review by James Nadal
- In January 2017, Sol Boricua was included on National Foundation for Popular Culture's Top 20 Outstanding Recordings of 2016 produced in Puerto Rico.
- Un 'Sol Boricua' Refulgente review by Rafael Vega Cury.
- James Nadal's Best Releases of 2016.
