= Garnish, Newfoundland and Labrador =

Garnish
- Town
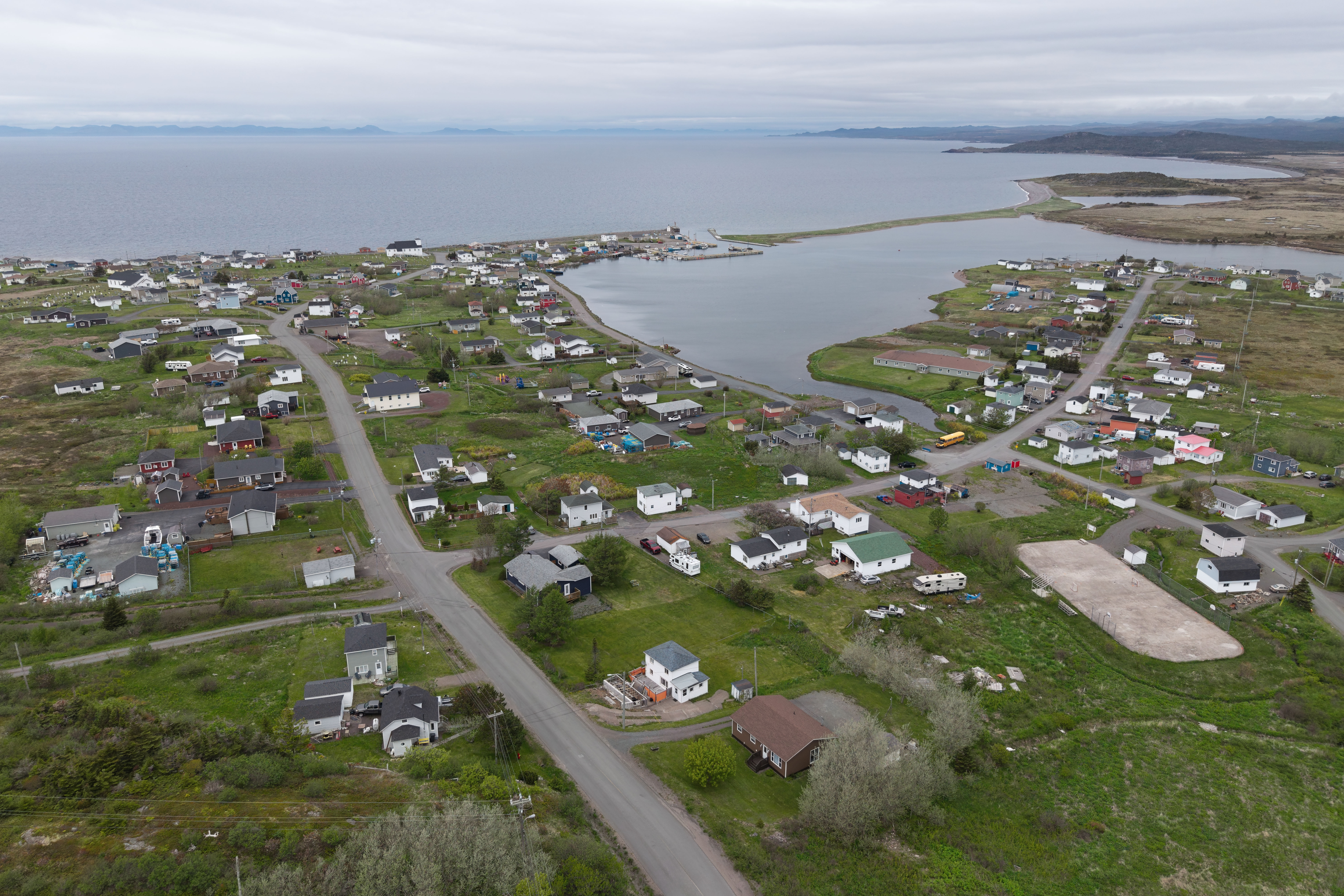

- Location of Garnish in Newfoundland
- Coordinates: 47°14′N 55°22′W
- Country: Canada
- Province: Newfoundland and Labrador

Population (2021)
  - Total: 542
- Time zone: UTC-3:30 (Newfoundland Time)
  - Summer (DST): UTC-2:30 (Newfoundland Daylight)
- Area code: 709
- Highways: Route 210; Route 213
- Website: www.townofgarnish.com
- Garnish Lighthouse
- Constructed: 1885 (first)
- Construction: aluminium skeletal tower
- Height: 3 m (9.8 ft)
- Shape: square prism skeletal tower with light
- Markings: three side daymark painted red the upper part, white the lower part
- Power source: solar power
- Operator: Garnish Heritage Society
- First lit: 1991 (current)
- Deactivated: 1991 (first)
- Focal height: 8 m (26 ft)
- Range: 6 nmi (11 km; 6.9 mi)
- Characteristic: Q R

Garnish, a town located on the west coast of the Burin Peninsula, was well known for its lumbering and now for its lobstering operations. Located on Route 213, it is 25 km along route 220 north west of Grand Bank and 18 km along Route 220 east of Marystown. The Way Office was established in 1852 and the first Waymaster was Henry Campe. In 2021, the town had a population of 542.

== Demographics ==
In the 2021 Census of Population conducted by Statistics Canada, Garnish had a population of 542 living in 243 of its 306 total private dwellings, a change of −4.6% from its 2016 population of 568. With a land area of 39.1 km^{2} (15.1 sq mi), it had a population density of 13.9/km^{2} (35.9/sq mi) in 2021.

== See also ==
- List of lighthouses in Canada
- List of cities and towns in Newfoundland and Labrador
- Burin Peninsula
- Newfoundland outport
