= Frances Cluett =

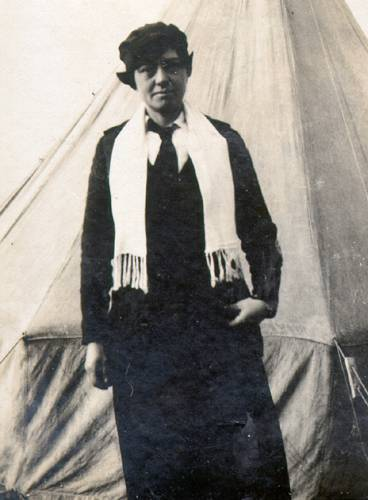
- Born: 25 June 1883; Belleoram, Newfoundland
- Died: November 1969
- Military career
- Allegiance: Canada
- Branch: Army Nurse
- Units: Volunteer Aid Detachment; 10th General Hospital
- Conflicts: World War I

Frances Cluett (June 25, 1883 – November, 1969) was an army nurse and educator from Newfoundland, noted for her service during World War I, and especially for her many letters back home beginning in 1916 that conveyed the eye-opening experiences of a young woman leaving home for the first time and explaining in vivid detail the horrors of war.

Cluett was born in Belleoram, Newfoundland, and during the war served in the Volunteer Aid Detachment in Europe. Cluett's two dozen letters give a detailed account of her departure from St. John's, travels to New York City, London, France, and Constantinople, and of her amazement at the horrors of the front line. These letters are currently housed in the Centre for Newfoundland Studies at the Memorial University of Newfoundland, and are in the process being published to commemorate the 90th anniversary of the battle at Beaumont Hamel in which so many Newfoundland men lost their lives.

Cluett wrote of her time spent attending countless soldiers at the 10th General Hospital in Rouen, France. Cluett was a spirited woman with a strong devotion to church and family — she describes in her letters the terror and awful suffering and yet it never dampens her spirit, which is best summed up in the last line of her expressive Easter Sunday letter, perhaps the darkest she wrote: Nothing would induce me to give it up.

== See also ==
- List of people of Newfoundland and Labrador
