= Music and Friends (Simani album) =

Studio album by Simani
- Released: 1987
- Recorded: 1987
- Studio: Sim's studio in Belleoram, Newfoundland.
- Genre: Folk, Celtic, traditional
- Length: 31:16
- Label: SwC SD-5067
- Producer: Independently produced

Simani chronology
Two for the Show (1986)	Music and Friends (1987)	Chapel Walls (1990)

Music and Friends is the fifth studio album release by Canadian musical duet Simani. The title track "Music and Friends" is a classic in Newfoundland culture. Two of the band's most popular tracks come from this album: "Music and Friends" and "Some Shocking Good". The album is noted to be an "anniversary" album issued to commemorate the band's tenth anniversary.

The album title is said to be a "tribute, in some small way, to the marvellous support [Simani] have experienced" throughout their career.

== Controversy ==
In 1999, Lloyd Candow, the original writer for "Some Shocking Good" sued the band for misuse of the track. After the initial album release Candow placed a copyright on the track, and made an agreement with the band not to use the track on any following album releases. When the compact disc version of the album was released, the song remained on the album, causing Candow to file suite.

The group initially had reservations about using material that was not their own. They reluctantly recorded the song anyway, and it ultimately ended up being a major success. Eventually a compact disc version of the album was released without the "Some Shocking Good" track, and two bonus tracks added in its stead.

== Track listing ==
=== Side one ===
1. "Music and Friends" – 2:45
2. "Stack of Barley" – 2:08
3. "The Bottle's Almost Empty" – 2:44
4. "Walking Uptown" – 2:05
5. "Old Man's Accordion" – 2:59
6. "Fortune Bay Sons" – 2:35

=== Side two ===
1. "Some Shocking Good" – 2:04
2. "Allan's Waltz" – 2:33
3. "Pay no Mind" – 3:07
4. "Reminiscing With Al Jensen" – 3:10
5. "Company Tonight" – 2:25
6. "Have A Drink Ol' Friend" – 2:41

=== Alternate CD Release ===
1. "Music and Friends"
2. "Stack of Barley"
3. "The Bottle's Almost Empty"
4. "Walking Downtown"
5. "Old Man's Accordion"
6. "Fortune Bay Sons"
7. "Taking Gear in the Night"
8. "Allan's Waltz"
9. "Pay no Mind"
10. "Reminiscing with Al Jensen"
11. "Company Tonight"
12. "Have a Drink Ol' Friend"
13. "Darling Say You'll Love Me"

== Personnel ==
Band

- Sim Savory – accordion, bass, keyboards, guitar, fiddle, mandolin
- Bud Davidge – vocals, harmony vocals
- Pious Hickey – vocals, guitar
- Hughie Poole – vocals, harmony vocals, guitar
- Merrill Stockley – vocals, keyboards
- Allan Bambury – accordion, bass
- Tom Keeping – vocals
- Don Sheppard – fiddle
- Al Jensen – fiddle
- Conrad Williams – drums
- Dave Williams – guitar
- Harvey Davidge – guitar
- "Nack" Savory – mouth organ

Production

- Sim Savory – recording engineer
- Simani – producer
- Alex Hickey – photography
