= Connaigre, Newfoundland and Labrador =

Fishing community in Canada

Connaigre was a small fishing community located on the southern tip of the Connaigre Peninsula of the south coast of the Island of Newfoundland in the Canadian province of Newfoundland and Labrador.

Connaigre was listed as Cap Negre (Cape Negro) in the Census of French Population and Agriculture, 1686 with a total population of seventy-two. It was the second largest French fishing station after Plaisance. Connaigre was also called Great Harbour in the 1763 census, with 5 inhabitants and twenty-eight servants recorded. In 1836 census the population was forty-three. In 1954 the entire community of twelve remaining families was resettled under the Centralization Program by the Newfoundland government.

== See also ==
- Connaigre Peninsula
- List of communities in Newfoundland and Labrador
- List of ghost towns in Newfoundland and Labrador
- Resettlement (Newfoundland)
