= Tracey Perry =

Canadian politician

Tracey Perry MHA

Member of the Newfoundland and Labrador House of Assembly for Fortune Bay-Cape La Hune
- In office October 9, 2007 – April 17, 2019
- Preceded by: Oliver Langdon
- Succeeded by: Elvis Loveless

Personal details
- Party: Progressive Conservative
- Spouse: Cletus MacDonald
- Education: Memorial University of Newfoundland
- Profession: consultant

Tracey Perry is a Canadian politician who served in the Newfoundland and Labrador House of Assembly from 2007 to 2019, representing the district of Fortune Bay-Cape La Hune as a member of the Progressive Conservative Party. She previously served as the Parliamentary Assistant to Premier Paul Davis.

== Early life ==
She is the youngest of thirteen children. Perry grew up and attended school in St. Alban's before leaving the region to attend university. She holds a Bachelor of Commerce (co-operative) degree from Memorial University; upon completion of university in 1993, she returned to her rural hometown of St. Alban's.

== Professional life ==
Upon returning to her hometown in 1993, she established and operated TMP Consulting Inc. In 1995, Perry began a successful career as executive director for the Coast of Bays Corporation (Regional Economic Development Board).

In addition, Perry has worked with Consulting and Audit Canada in Ottawa, as well as the head office of the Atlantic Canada Opportunities Agency in Moncton. She participated in a Newfoundland to Iceland Economic Study Mission (1997), a Trade Team Canada Mission to Japan (1999) and a Team Canada Trade Mission to Iceland 2007, where she gained insight into development approaches of other jurisdictions and the challenges of small business in a global marketplace.

Perry served as a Girl Guide Leader from 1993 to 1996, then became president of the Bay d’Espoir Development Association (1997-1998). From 1999 to 2001, she chaired the Newfoundland Salmonid Growers Association, and was a member of the Canadian Aquaculture Industry Association’s Standing Committee on Human Resources from 2002 to 2004. She also served on the Rural Secretariat for Council #5 from 2003-2007.

== Political life ==
On October 9, 2007, Perry became the first woman ever elected to serve the district of Fortune Bay-Cape La Hune as a member of the House of Assembly.

In 2008, Perry was injured in a car crash just five months after being elected. She spent months recuperating from a serious neck injury that forced her to attend House of Assembly sessions that spring wearing a neck brace.

In 2014, Perry was appointed Parliamentary Secretary to the Minister of Innovation, Business and Rural Development and subsequently Parliamentary Assistant to the Premier serving until the Davis government was defeated in the 2015 general election.

She was re-elected in the 2011 and 2015 general elections.

In 2018, Perry gained notable attention for her role in the House of Assembly harassment scandal; specifically for filing a complaint against then-Cabinet Minister Eddie Joyce.

Perry did not run for re-election in the 2019 provincial election.

== Electoral record ==
2015 Newfoundland and Labrador general election
Party	Candidate	Votes	%	±%
Progressive Conservative	Tracey Perry	1,830	49.07	-18.20
Liberal	Bill Carter	1,405	37.68	+22.21
New Democratic	Mildred Skinner	494	13.25	-4.01
Total valid votes		3,729	100.00	
Progressive Conservative hold		Swing		-20.20
Source(s) "Provincial General Election Report" (PDF). Elections Newfoundland and Labrador. 11 October 2015. p. 24.

2011 Newfoundland and Labrador general election
Party	Candidate	Votes	%	±%
Progressive Conservative	Tracey Perry	2,592	67.27%	–
NDP	Susan Skinner	665	17.26%	
Liberal	Eric Skinner	596	15.47%	

2007 Newfoundland and Labrador general election
Party	Candidate	Votes	%	±%
Progressive Conservative	Tracey Perry	2,539	63.19%	–
Liberal	Elvis Loveless	1,394	34.72%	
NDP	Sheldon Hynes	84	2.09%	
