= Augustus Oldford =

Canadian magistrate and politician (1925–2023)

MHA for Fortune Bay
- In office 1971–1972
- Preceded by: H.R.V. Earle
- Succeeded by: H.R.V. Earle

Minister Without Portfolio
- In office July 30, 1971 – November 25, 1971
- Preceded by: Philip J. Lewis
- Succeeded by: Uriah Strickland

Minister of Supply and Services
- In office November 25, 1971 – January 18, 1972
- Preceded by: John A. Nolan
- Succeeded by: Gordon Dawe

Personal details
- Born: October 18, 1925
- Died: October 27, 2023 (aged 98)

William Augustus Oldford (October 18, 1925 – October 27, 2023) was a Canadian social worker, magistrate and politician in Newfoundland. He represented Fortune Bay in the Newfoundland House of Assembly from 1971 to 1972 as a Liberal.

== Life and career ==
The son of Augustus Oldford and Hilda Rose, he was born in Burnside and was educated there and at Memorial University College. He taught school for four years and then worked as a welfare officer at Jackson's Arm from 1951 to 1958. He then served as a magistrate until 1971, when he stepped down from the bench to enter provincial politics. He served in the Newfoundland cabinet as a minister without portfolio and as Minister of Supply and Services.

Oldford resigned his seat in the assembly in January 1972, which gave the Progressive Conservative party a majority of seats. He was named a magistrate in March 1972 and served in Grand Falls and Wabush-Labrador City. He was a named a provincial court judge in Springdale in 1977, retiring from the bench in 1990.

Oldford married Mabel Caines. He died on October 27, 2023, at the age of 98.
