= H.R.V. Earle =

Canadian politician

H.R. Valence Earle

MHA for Fortune Bay
- In office 1962–1971
- Succeeded by: Augustus Oldford
- In office 1972–1975
- Preceded by: Augustus Olford

Personal details
- Born: December 22, 1912 Fogo, Dominion of Newfoundland
- Died: February 1, 1996 (aged 83) St. John's, Newfoundland
- Party: Liberal (?–1971); Progressive Conservative

Henry Robert Valence Earle (December 22, 1912 – February 1, 1996) was a Canadian politician. He represented the electoral district of Fortune Bay in the Newfoundland and Labrador House of Assembly from 1962 to 1971 and 1972 to 1975. He was a member of the Liberal Party of Newfoundland and Labrador for his first term and a member of the Progressive Conservative Party of Newfoundland and Labrador for his second. He was born in Fogo, Newfoundland. He served in cabinet under various portfolios, including Minister of Finance, Education, Economic Development, and Public Works & Services.
