= Music & Friends (Cafêzz album) =

Studio album by Cafêzz
- Released: 2014

Cafêzz chronology
Music & Friends (2014)	Sol Boricua (2016)

Music & Friends is Cafêzz' debut album, released in 2014. The album includes 14 compositions from Puerto Rican pianist Carmen Noemí. The band's style is eclectic, taking from Brazilian, Caribbean, jazz, rock, Latin, folk, and classical influences.

The music is organized in two parts, or playlists, and most of the compositions reference coffee. The first seven tracks are relaxed and pleasant, like a "latte coffee", while tracks 8 thru 14 are lively and exciting, as an "espresso".

== Tracks ==
All songs composed and arranged by Carmen Noemí (ASCAP)

=== Latte Mood ===
1. A Little Coffee 4:32
2. Waterfalls 6:14
3. De Paseo... 4:57
4. Barco De Papel 4:51
5. Por La Vereda 5:21
6. Luna Gris 5:04
7. Mis Recuerdos 3:37

=== Espresso Mood ===
1. Cafe Colao 5:12
2. Mocha Samba 5:13
3. Mr. Flat Ninth 4:32
4. Piña Colada 5:10
5. Espresso Jam 5:12
6. Coffee Break! 4:17
7. De Paseo (Trio) 3:07

== Personnel ==
- Carmen Noemí - piano and keyboards
- Edgardo ‘Egui’ Sierra - electric fretted and fretless basses, Navarro pickups and basses
- Christian Nieves - Puerto Rican cuatro
- Ariana González - Puerto Rican cuatro
- Ricardo Pons – flute
- Pedro Rivera Toledo - alto sax
- Edgardo G. Sierra - alto sax
- Norberto "Tiko" Ortiz - tenor sax
- José Roberto Jiménez - tenor sax
- Roberto Bermúdez - tenor sax
- Rafael "El indio" Martínez - baritone sax
- Raúl Maldonado - drums, bongos, darbouka
- Danny Lloret - drums
- Arnaldo Rivera – drums
- Marlene Grafals - drums, bongos
- Paoli Mejías – congas
- Christian Galíndez - congas, bongos, percussion
- Errol Oliver - percussion
- Mónika Nieves - güiro
- Osvaldo López - electric guitar
- Ricardo Lugo - electric bass
- Angélika Kolsan - electric bass
- Ismael Rodríguez - rhodes piano
- Renaldo Guadalupe - acoustic guitar

Produced, recorded and mixed by Edgardo Sierra

Recorded at EdS Music Recording Studio, San Juan, PR; and Inter Metro Recording Studio, San Juan, PR

Mastering engineer: David Rodríguez

Mastered at Digital Recording Services, Levitown, PR

== Reviews and articles ==
- All About Jazz Magazine - 5 Star Review by James Nadal
- In January 2015, Cafêzz' Music & Friends was included on National Foundation for Popular Culture's Top 20 Outstanding Recordings of 2014 produced in Puerto Rico.
- El Nuevo Día - Zafra Musical sin Precedentes
- Caribe Jazz Magazine - Interview
- Coffee Lovers Magazine - Music & Interview: Cafêzz Music & Friends
- El Nuevo Día - Una Combinación Perfecta
- Caribe Jazz Magazine - CD Review by Wilbert Sostre
- El Nuevo Día - Despierta los Sentidos como el Café
