= Trammer, Newfoundland and Labrador =

Trammer Tremor
- Abandoned Town
- Location of Trammer in Newfoundland
- Coordinates: 47°35′50.6″N 55°00′49.9″W
- Country: Canada
- Province: Newfoundland and Labrador
- Census division: Division 2
- Census subdivision: Division 2

Population (1921)
  - Total: 4
- Time zone: UTC– 3:30 (Newfoundland Time)
  - Summer (DST): UTC– 2:30 (Newfoundland Daylight)
- Area code: 709
- Bay: Fortune Bay

Trammer (sometimes spelled Tremor or Tranmer) is an abandoned town in Newfoundland and Labrador, Canada that had a peak population of 15 in 1901.

== History ==
Located near the resettled community of Femme in Fortune Bay, Trammer was first settled in the 1870s by the family of James Evans. Never a large town, it first appears in the census of 1884 with a small population of 6 with the Handrigan, Paul and Osmond families being the only other occupants from that first census until the turn of the century. By the turn of the 20th century, Trammer's residents were active in the fishery, particularly that of cod, herring, and lobster.

== Demographics ==
Trammer Population By Year
1884 Census	6
1891 Census	12
1901 Census	15
1911 Census	4
1921 Census	4

After 1921 and the death of its primary resident, James Evans, the community of Trammer was abandoned.

== See also ==
- English Harbour East
- Femme, Newfoundland and Labrador
