= Frenchman's Cove, Newfoundland and Labrador =

Frenchman's Cove
- Town
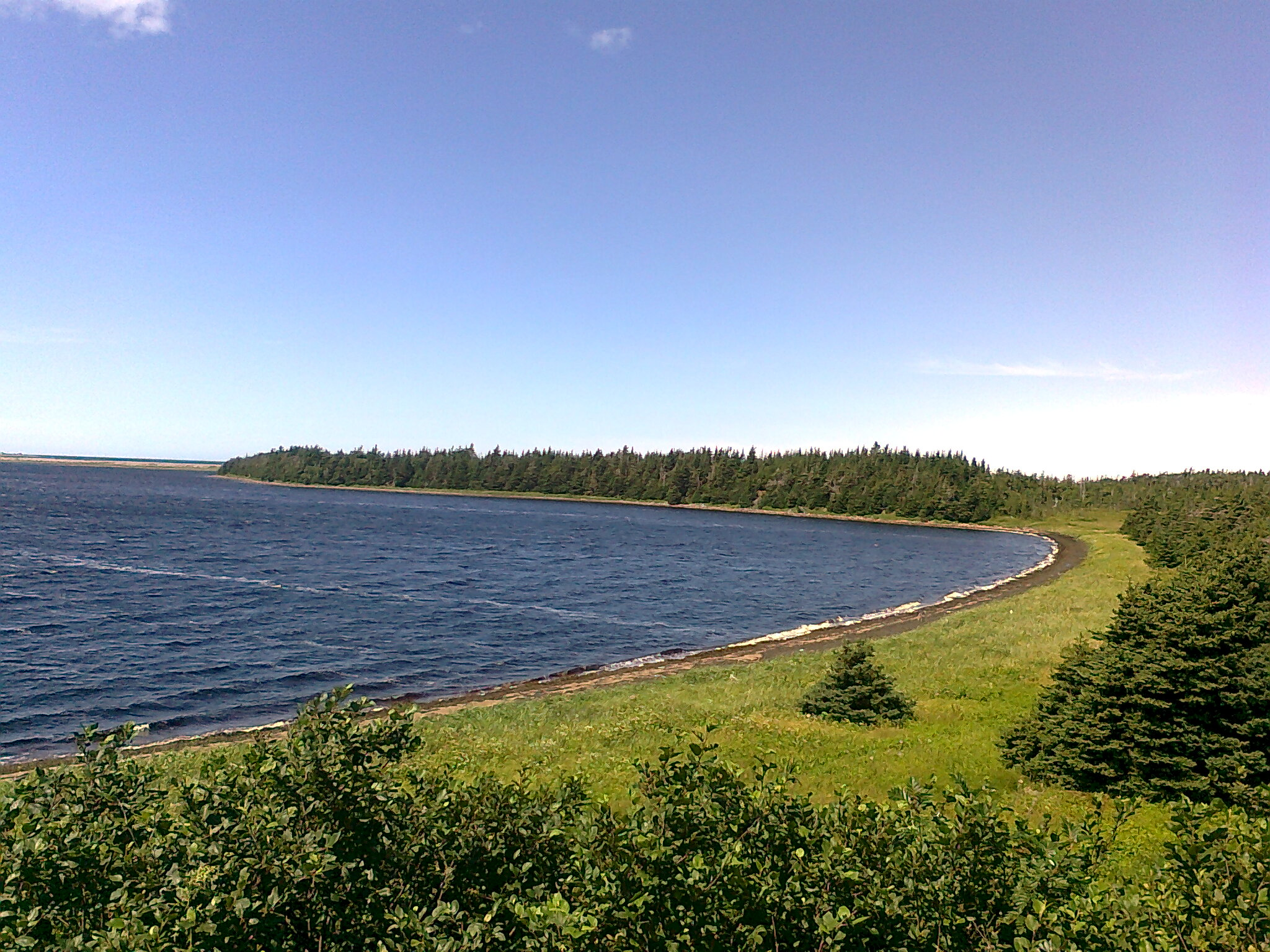

- Location within Newfoundland
- Coordinates: 47°12′56″N 55°24′21″W
- Country: Canada
- Province: Newfoundland and Labrador

Area
  - Land: 68.55 km^{2} (26.47 sq mi)

Population (2021)
  - Total: 159
  - Density: 2.5/km^{2} (6.5/sq mi)
- Time zone: UTC-3:30 (Newfoundland Time)
  - Summer (DST): UTC-2:30 (Newfoundland Daylight)
- Area code: 709
- Highways: Route 210; Route 213

Frenchman's Cove is a town on the west coast of Burin Peninsula, Newfoundland and Labrador, Canada. It had a population of 159 in the Canada 2021 Census, a drop from 172 in 2011. The town has been inhabited since before 1836, the earliest known documentation about it, when it appeared in the first Newfoundland Census. According to local folklore and tradition, the first settlers were named Cluetts and were of French origin. The small-boat inshore fishery was the economic mainstay of the area until the late 1800s when did men went work on the schooners operating from Grand Bank. Residents also grew turnips, cabbages, and potatoes, as well as hay for their horses, cattle, sheep, and chickens.

Nearby Frenchman's Cove Provincial Park, is next to a large barachois, sand and mud flats, mixed forest, and tidal lagoons. Wildlife in the area includes sea and terrestrial birds, including Canada Geese.

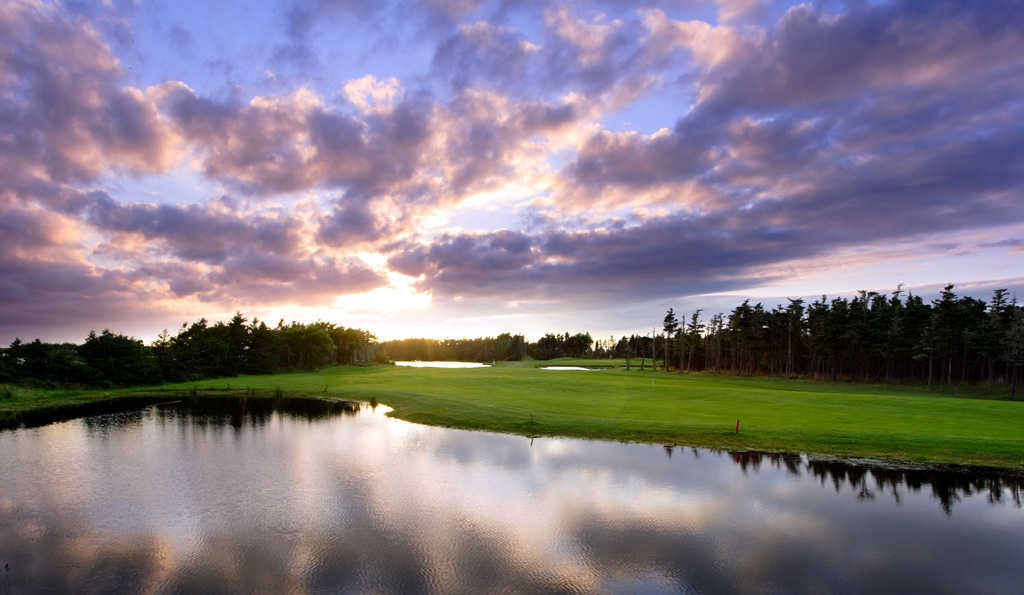
Grande Meadows Golf Club at Frenchman's Cove

== Demographics ==
In the 2021 Census of Population conducted by Statistics Canada, Frenchman's Cove had a population of 159 living in 78 of its 126 total private dwellings, a change of −5.9% from its 2016 population of 169. With a land area of 69.07 km^{2} (26.67 sq mi), it had a population density of 2.3/km^{2} (6.0/sq mi) in 2021.
