= Bay d'Est =

- Unincorporated community
- Country: Canada
- Province: Newfoundland and Labrador
- Time zone: UTC-3:30 (Newfoundland Time)
  - Summer (DST): UTC-2:30 (Newfoundland Daylight)
- Area code: 709

Bay d'Est (/ˌbeɪdiˈiːst/ BAY-dee-EEST) is a former unincorporated community in Fortune Bay District in Newfoundland and Labrador, Canada. In the 1921 census, it consisted of 40 persons in 9 households.
