= Boxey, Newfoundland and Labrador =

Settlement in Newfoundland and Labrador, Canada

Coordinates: 47°27′11″N 55°33′41″W

Location of Boxey in Newfoundland and Labrador

Boxey is a settlement in Newfoundland and Labrador. It is a small town on the south coast of Newfoundland and Labrador. Since its amalgamation in the 1970's, it has been part of the town of St. Jacques-Coomb's Cove.

== History ==
The name Boxey derive from the box-like timber that early settlers cleared from the area. The community was settled in the early 1830s by the Blagdon brothers, who came from Bay L’Argent (also known as Bay Le Jean). The family had originally emigrated to Newfoundland from Dover, England. Two of the brothers owned fishing vessels known at the time as jack boats and fished as far as the Brunette Islands, located approximately 15 to 16 miles from the settlement. By the late nineteenth and early twentieth centuries, Boxey had developed into an active fishing community. A lobster factory operated at Stones Head and was owned by the Foote family of Grand Bank. Fishing provided the primary livelihood for most residents through shore and bank fishing, while rum-running also formed part of the local economy during the same period.
