= Brunette Island =

Island in Newfoundland and Labrador, Canada

- Location within Newfoundland

Geography
- Location: Fortune Bay
- Coordinates: 47°16′47″N 55°54′02″W
- Area: 20 km^{2} (7.7 sq mi)
- Highest elevation: 160 m (520 ft)

Administration
- Canada
- Province: Newfoundland and Labrador

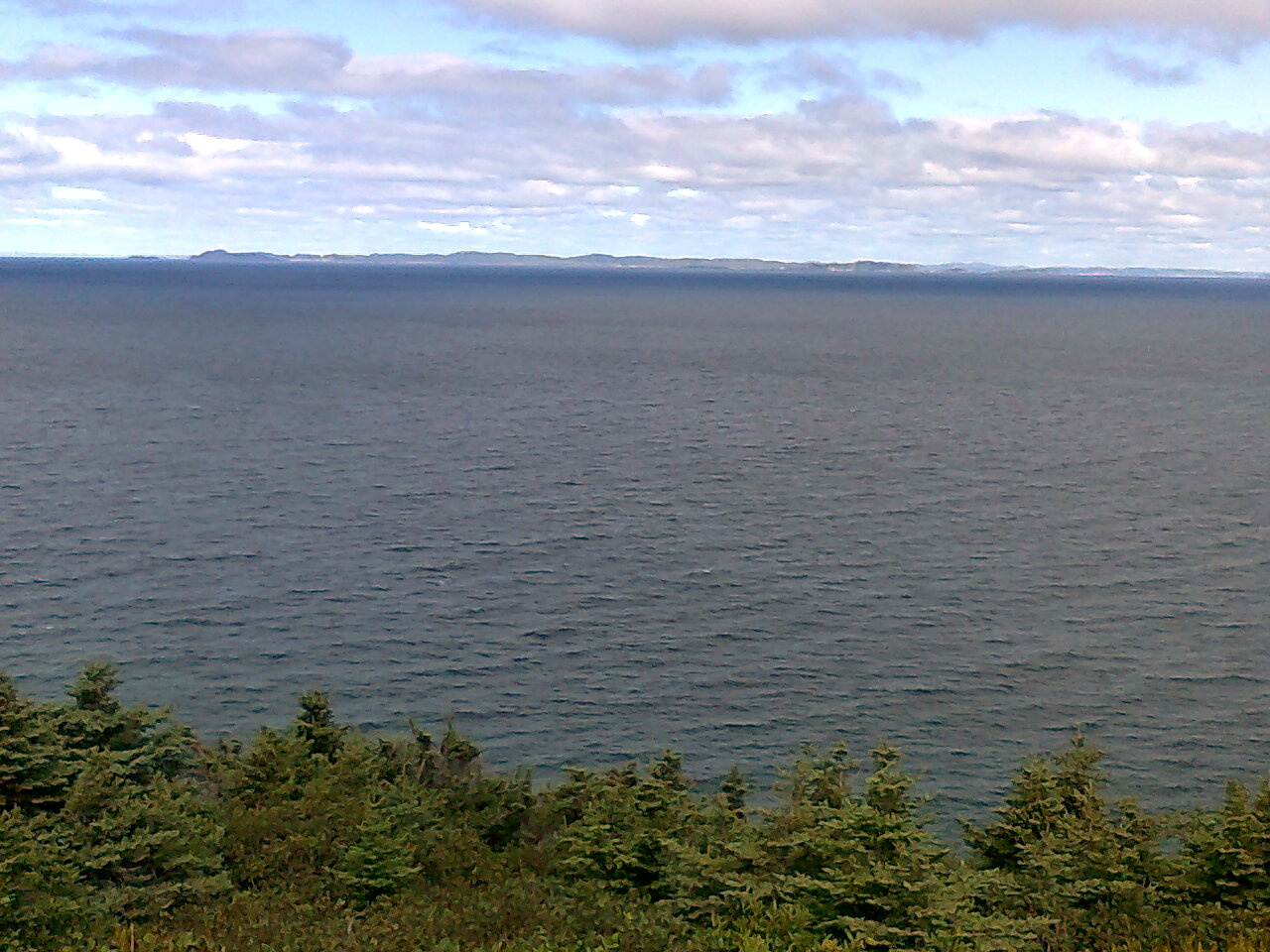
Brunette Island

Brunette Island is an island in Newfoundland and Labrador, Canada, the largest island in the Fortune Bay.

== History ==
A fishing community was established on the island in the 1800s, and at one time there were about 300 residents living primarily at two locations: Mercer's Cove and Forward's Cove. In 1865 a 30-foot high lighthouse was built on the island. A new lighthouse was built by 1924.

The entire village was resettled off the island in the 1950s.

In 1964, an experimental attempt to introduce bison to Newfoundland was made, using Brunette Island as a test site; the attempt did not prove successful; the rocky landscape and sheer cliffs on the island were significantly different from the wide plains to which the bison were adapted.

With more success, wildlife biologists continued to use Brunette as a site for wildlife observation and a breeding ground for Arctic hare, caribou, ptarmigan, and moose. The lack of large predators on the island allowed the populations to expand as far as food resources would allow. At times the island has been opened to hunters.

From October 12–23, 2016, Mack McGowen, a native of Tyler, Texas, lived alone on Brunette Island and streamed the experience live on Facebook in a documentary titled "Castaway Live."

Mercer Head on Brunette Island continues to be the site of a navigational light.
