= Wreck Cove =

Settlement in Newfoundland, Canada

- Unincorporated community
- Interactive map of Wreck Cove
- Coordinates: 47°29′46″N 55°36′22″W
- Country: Canada
- Province: Newfoundland and Labrador
- Time zone: UTC−3:30 (Newfoundland Time Zone)
  - Summer (DST): UTC−2:30 (Newfoundland Daylight Time)
- Area code: 709

Wreck Cove, originally known as Tibbos Hill, is a settlement in Newfoundland and Labrador. It is located in Fortune Bay, south west of Belleoram. The first postmistress was Olive Sheppard. The community is now a part of the town of St. Jacques-Coomb's Cove.
