= Pool's Cove =

- Village
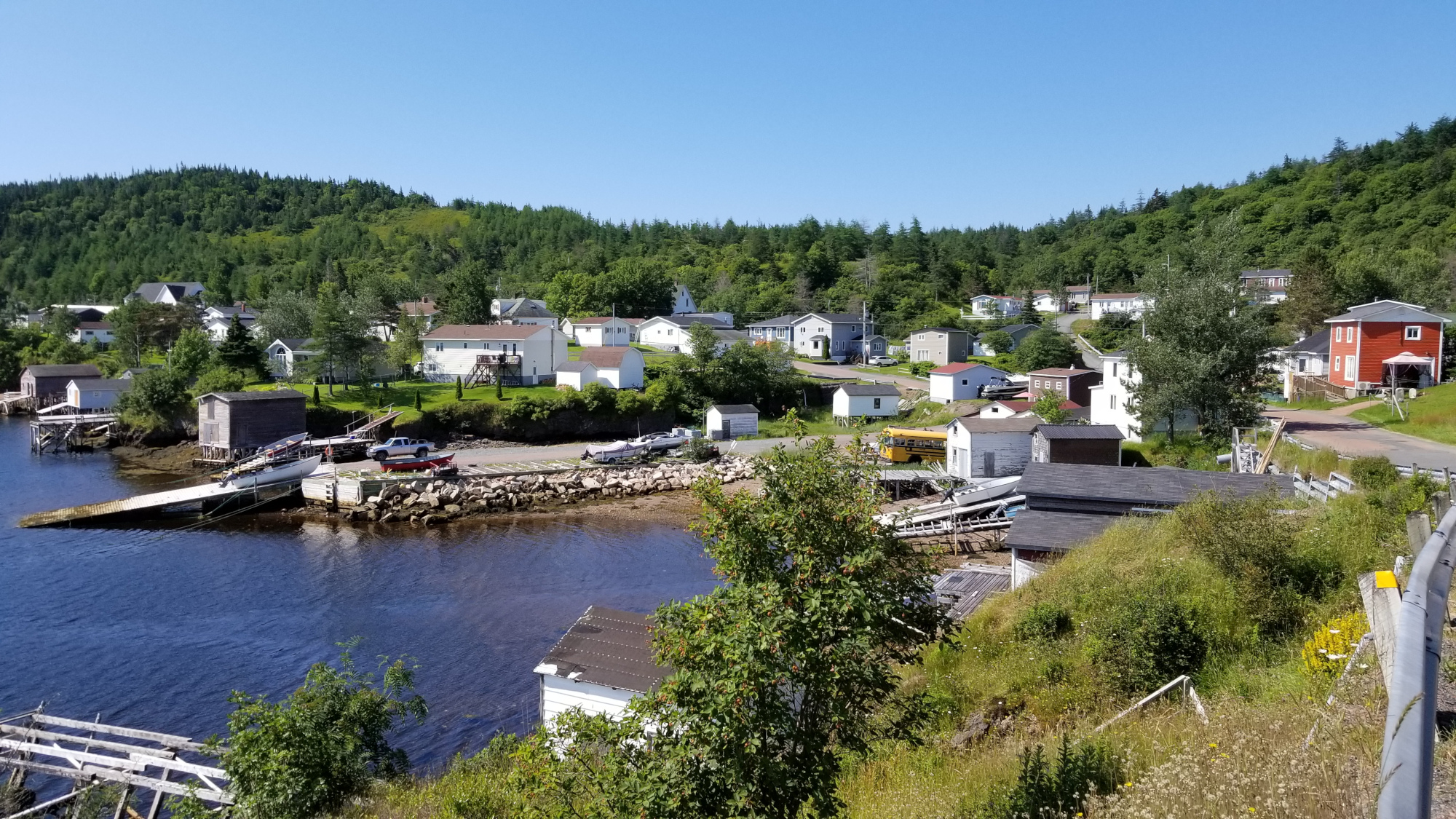
- Pool's Cove from a Hill

- Location of Pool's Cove in Newfoundland
- Coordinates: 47°40′47.70″N 55°25′52.45″W
- Country: Canada
- Province: Newfoundland and Labrador

Population (2021)
  - Total: 188
  - Density: 73.1/km^{2} (189/sq mi)
- Time zone: UTC-3:30 (Newfoundland Time)
  - Summer (DST): UTC-2:30 (Newfoundland Daylight)
- Area code: 709
- Highways: Route 362-10; Ferry to Rencontre East and Bay L'Argent

Pool's Cove is a fishing village located on the north west side of Fortune Bay, on the South Coast of Newfoundland, Canada. The town had a population of 188 in the 2021 Census. The town is approximately 200 kilometres (120 mi) southeast of Grand Falls-Windsor.

== History & Town Information ==
Historically, Pool's Cove has been an important location for the local fishing industry, and while fishing remains a part of its economy, the town has diversified in recent years especially in the logging industry.

Pool's Cove contains a community museum that showcases the local history and heritage, including the stories of nearby resettled communities.

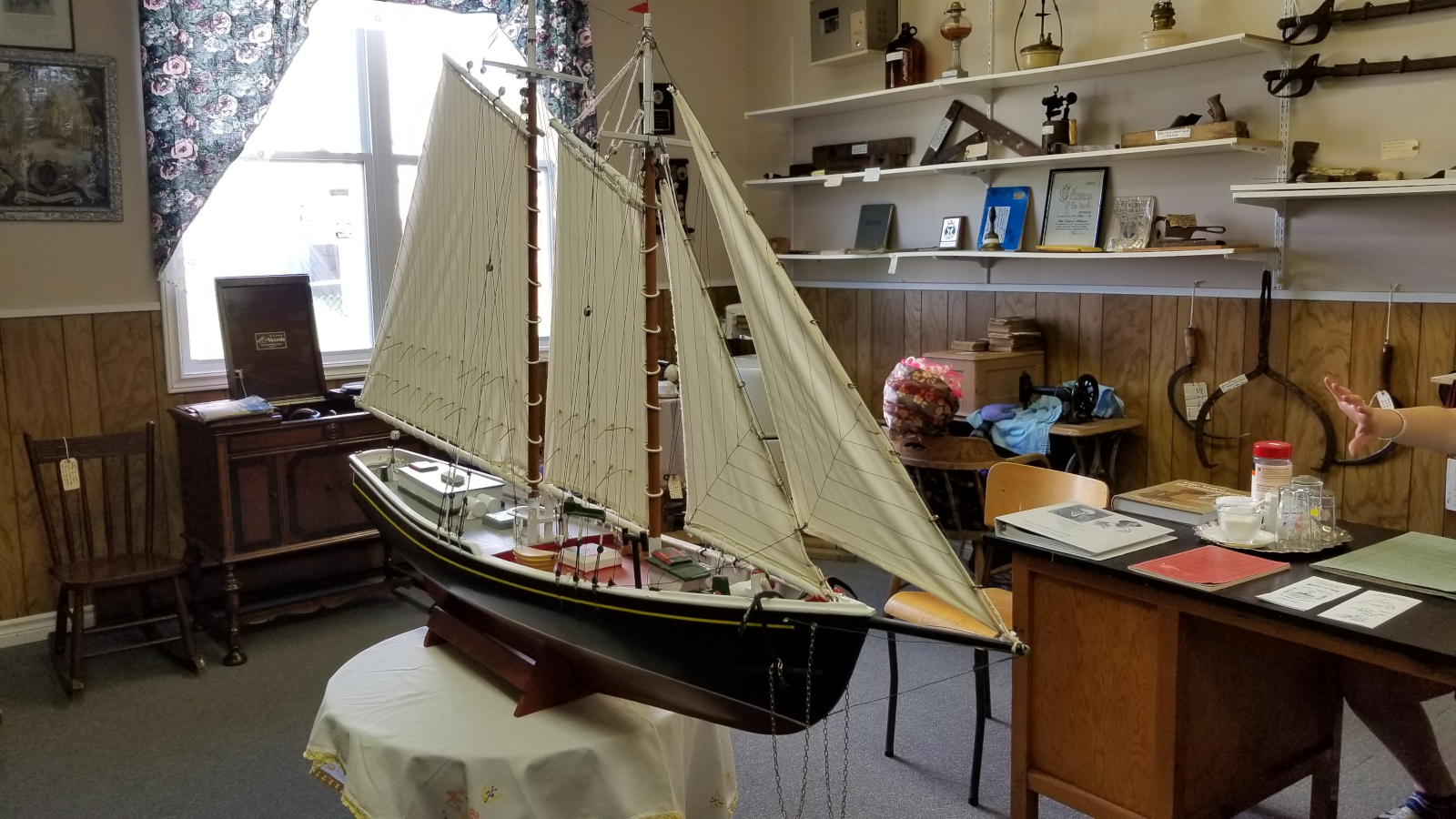
Pool's Cove Museum showcasing a Ship

The village is also the gateway to the Bay du Nord River, a designated Canadian Heritage River, which offers opportunities for backcountry wilderness recreation, including canoeing, kayaking, angling, and birdwatching.

The current town mayor as of 2024 is Edmund Perham.

== Demographics ==
In the 2021 Census of Population conducted by Statistics Canada, Pool's Cove had a population of 188 living in 62 of its 75 total private dwellings, a change of −2.6% from its 2016 population of 193. With a land area of 2.65 km^{2} (1.02 sq mi), it had a population density of 54.0/km^{2} (139.8/sq mi) in 2021.

== Navigating ==
Pool's Cove is located on the Connaigre Peninsula, and can be accessed by driving Route 360 or taking the passenger ferry from Bay L'Argent on the Burin Peninsula. Access to Pool's Cove is unique as it is one of the stops on the ferry route connecting Rencontre East to Bay L'Argent. The ferry service is passenger-only, meaning no vehicles are allowed.

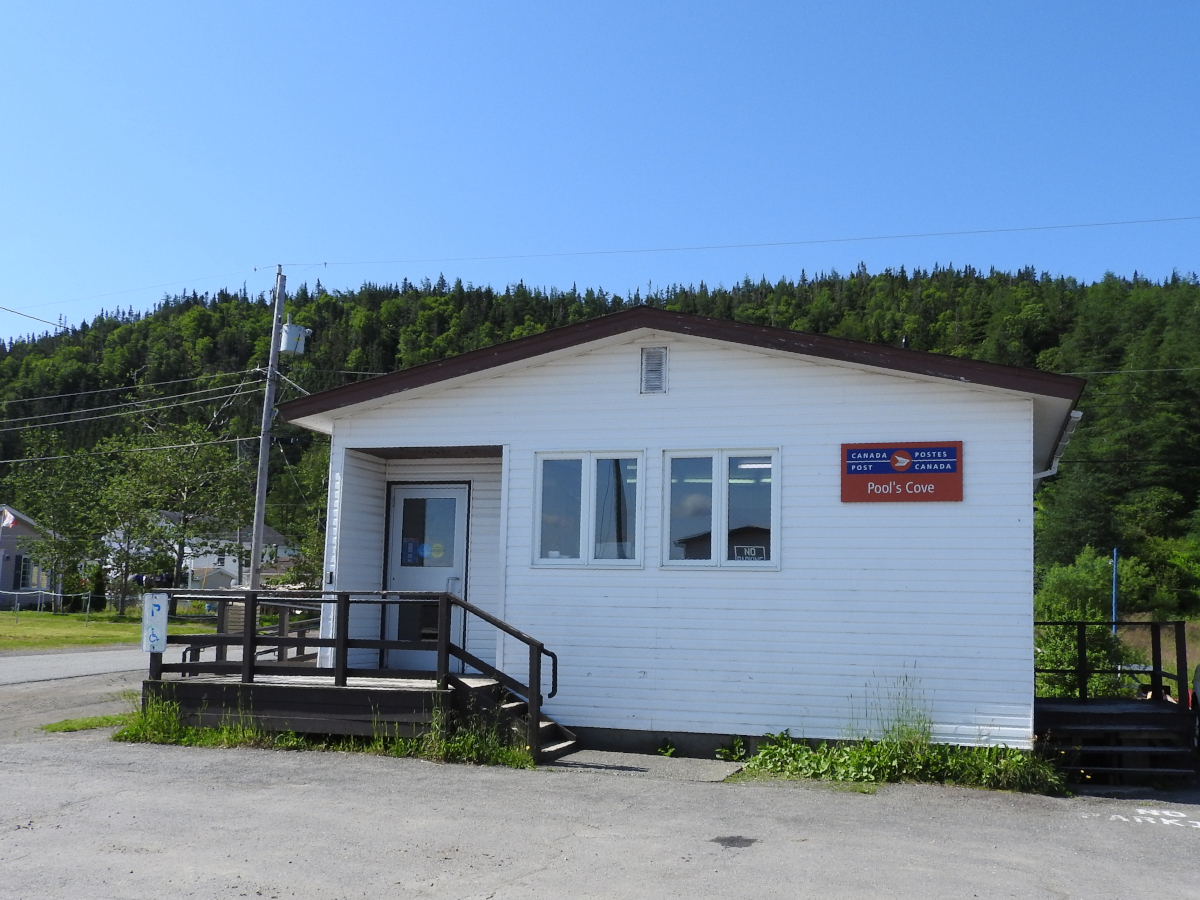
Town Post Office of Pool's Cove

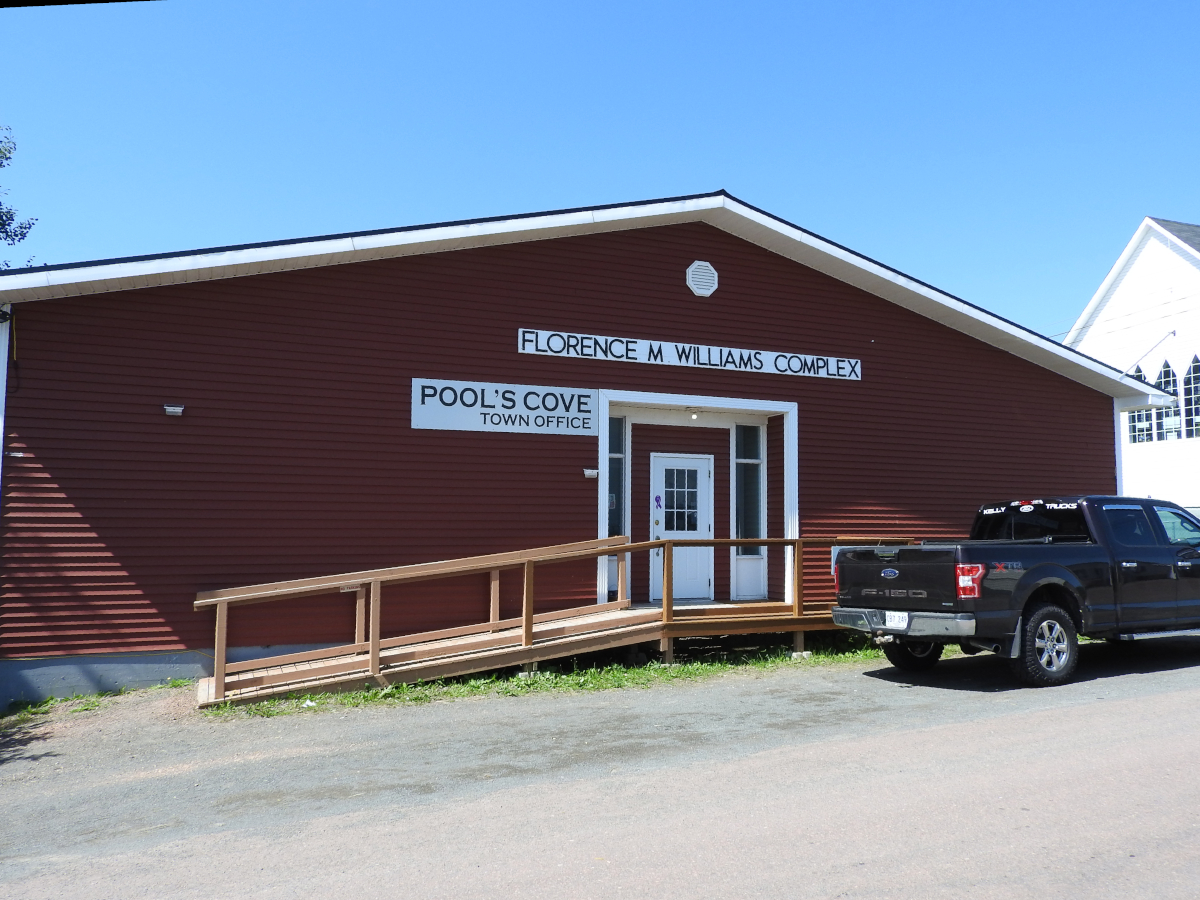
Town Office of Pool's Cove

== Turnip Cove ==
Turnip Cove is a resettled fishing community located within the boundary of the town. By the 1960s, the people of Turnip Cove were mostly resettled. A road was built through Pool's Cove in the 1990s and an adjacent road was built down to Turnip Cove, making it very accessible.
