= Frenchman's Cove Provincial Park =

Provincial park in Newfoundland and Labrador, Canada

Coordinates: 47.209°N 55.403°W

Location of Frenchman's Cove Provincial Park in Newfoundland and Labrador

Frenchman's Cove Provincial Park, is a provincial park located on the west side of the Burin Peninsula in Newfoundland and Labrador, Canada.

== See also ==
- List of Newfoundland and Labrador parks
- List of Canadian provincial parks
