= Femme, Newfoundland and Labrador =

Coordinates: 47.6024819°N 54.9820491°W

Location of Femme in Newfoundland and Labrador

Femme is an abandoned community in Newfoundland and Labrador.
