= Bay L'Argent =

- Town
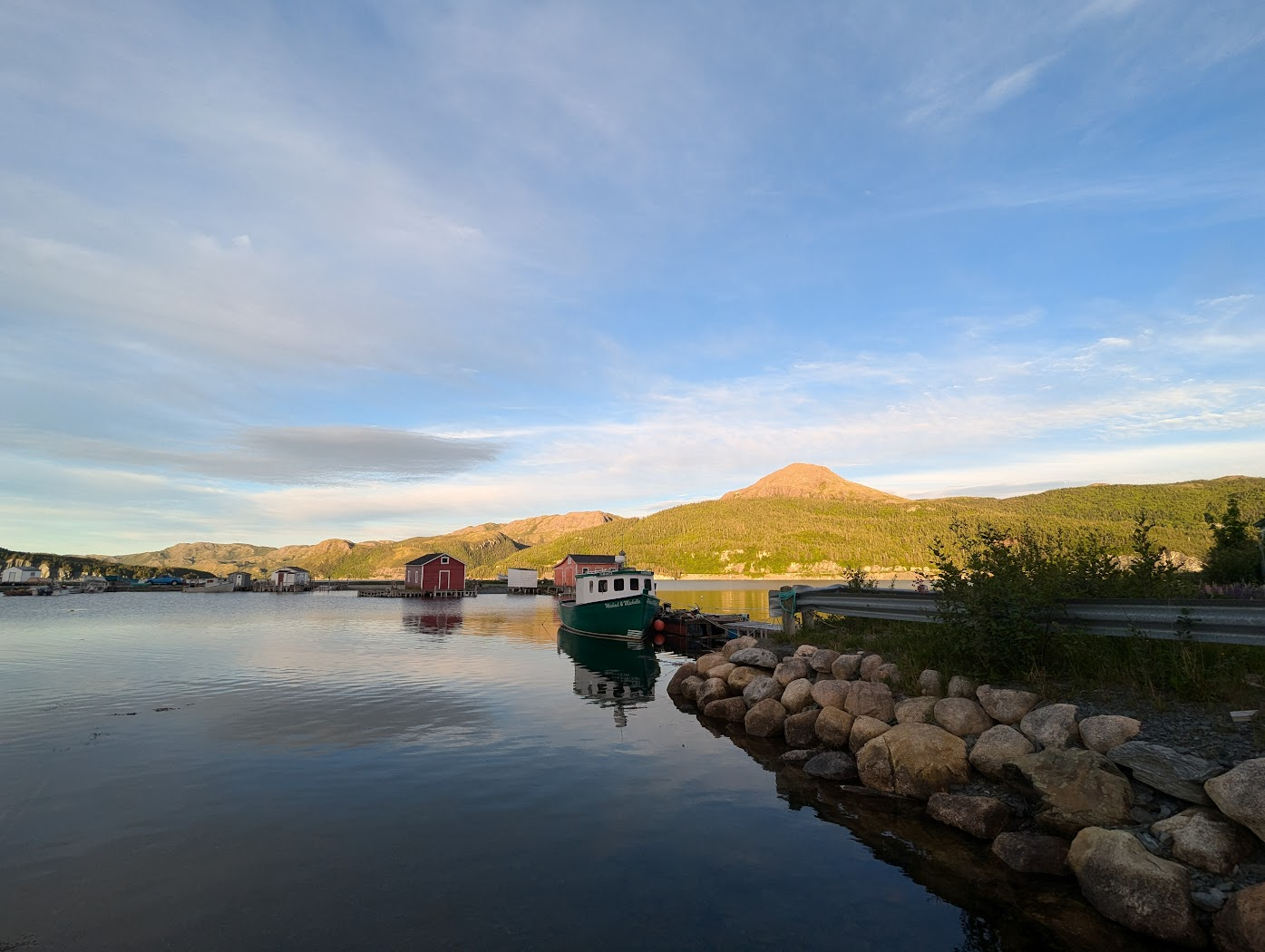

- Location of Bay L'Argent in Newfoundland
- Coordinates: 47°32′45″N 54°52′58″W
- Country: Canada
- Province: Newfoundland and Labrador

Government
  - Mayor: Alvin Banfield
  - MP: Jonathan Rowe

Area
  - Land: 3.74 km^{2} (1.44 sq mi)

Population (2021)
  - Total: 234
  - Density: 29.5/km^{2} (76/sq mi)
- Time zone: UTC-3:30 (Newfoundland Time)
  - Summer (DST): UTC-2:30 (Newfoundland Daylight)
- Area code: 709
- Highways: Route 212; Ferry to Rencontre East and Pool's Cove

Bay L'Argent (/beɪˈlɑːrdʒɛnt/ bay-LAR-jent) is a town in the Canadian province of Newfoundland and Labrador.

The ferry MV Terra Nova has a port in Bay L'Argent servicing the isolated outport of Rencontre East with another port in Pool's Cove, on the Connaigre Peninsula.

== History ==
In 2009, the Bay L'Argent town council made Newfoundland and Labrador history by electing the first ever all-female council.

== Demographics ==
In the 2021 Census of Population conducted by Statistics Canada, Bay L'Argent had a population of 234 living in 115 of its 134 total private dwellings, a change of −2.9% from its 2016 population of 241. With a land area of 3.74 km^{2} (1.44 sq mi), it had a population density of 62.6/km^{2} (162.0/sq mi) in 2021.

== See also ==
- Burin Peninsula
- List of cities and towns in Newfoundland and Labrador
