= Rencontre East =

- Town
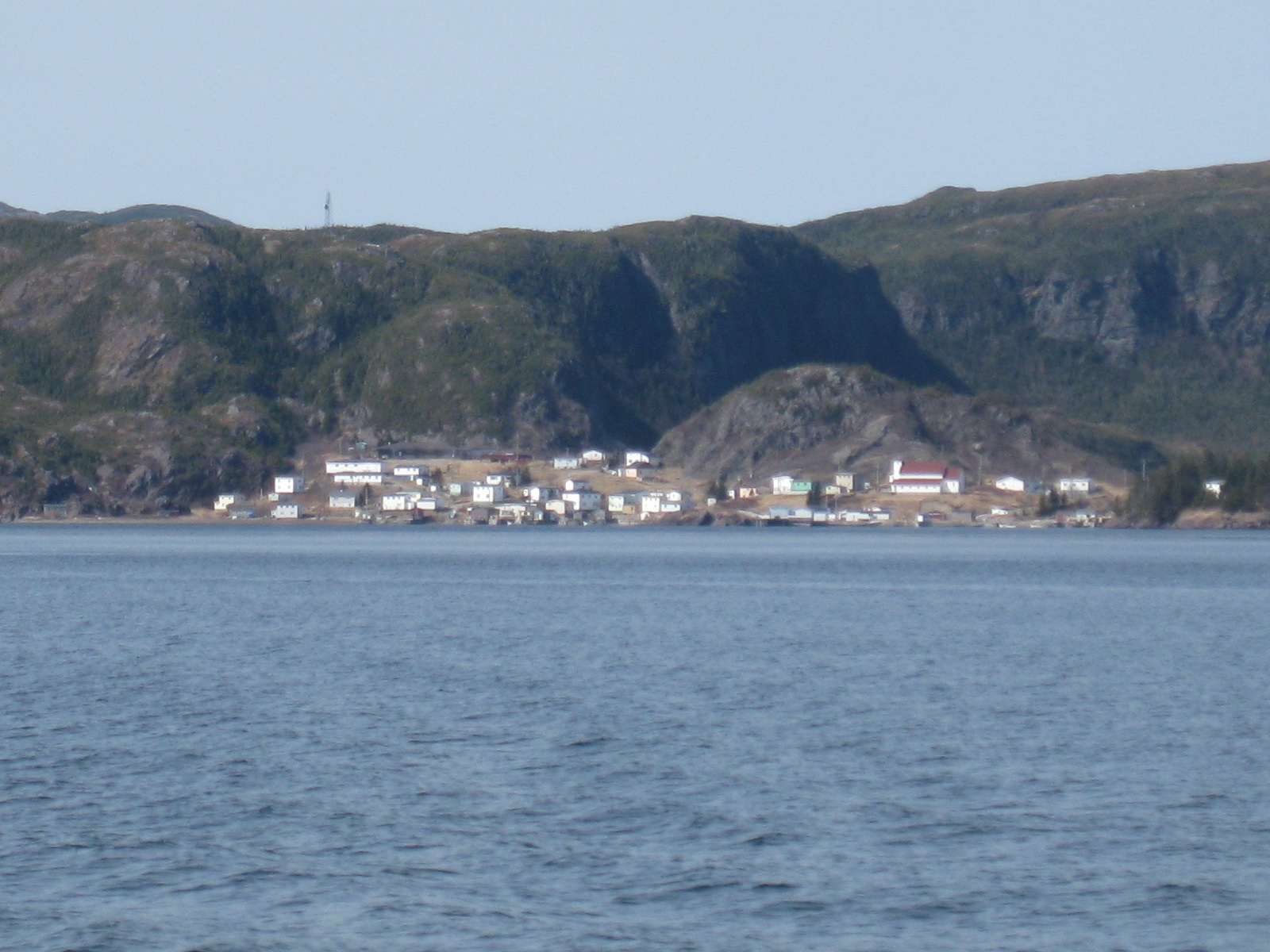
- Motto: Isolated and Loving It
- Location of Rencontre East in Newfoundland
- Coordinates: 47°38′15″N 55°12′55″W
- Country: Canada
- Province: Newfoundland and Labrador

Government
  - Mayor: Peter Giovannini

Population (2021)
  - Total: 115
  - Density: 53.8/km^{2} (139/sq mi)
- Time zone: UTC-3:30 (Newfoundland Time)
  - Summer (DST): UTC-2:30 (Newfoundland Daylight)
- Area code: 709
- Highways: Ferry to Bay L'Argent and Pool's Cove

Rencontre East is a small, outport community in Newfoundland and Labrador, Canada located north east of Belleoram, and west of Terrenceville in Fortune Bay. The population was 115 in the 2021 census. This small community is not connected to any surrounding areas by road.

Rencontre East is accessible by scheduled ferry service (MV Terra Nova) from ports in Pool's Cove (1 hour, 15 minutes) and Bay L'Argent (1 hour, 45 minutes). The MV Terra Nova takes 30 passengers and is passenger service only (no vehicles).

== History ==
The main industry is cod and lobster fishing. Rencontre East was the location of one of only a few molybdenum mines in Canada's history. The mine was located at Ackley City at Rencontre Lake just north of the town. The mine was closed soon after, with only two-thousand tonnes of mineral being exported.

=== Aquaculture ===
Aquaculture is an important economic driver, with the advent of salmon farming. As of July 2011, aquaculture in Rencontre East became fully operational, with more than 20 of the town's people working on the three sites. Combined, there are more than 2 million salmon in the sites. As the traditional cod and lobster fisheries are waning, mostly because it becoming uneconomical to do so and the age of the fishermen nearing that of retirement, modern fish farming will reverse the downturn of the town. Rencontre East was one of the areas in Fortune Bay affected by the September 2019 event in which 2.6 million farmed salmon died. Following the die-off, images of salmon residue being dumped into the ocean near Rencontre East were widely circulated in local media.

== Infrastructure ==
All the roads are dirt and ATVs are the main source of transportation. The community uses breakwaters to hold the roads in place and keep the water from washing them away.

The town has a grocery store (Judy's General Store), a volunteer fire department, an all grade school (St. Stephen's) and a community centre. There are two churches, one Anglican, St. Stephen's, and one Catholic, St. Joseph's, of which is no longer in use and the building condemned.

St. Stephen's all-grade school has just a few students, from kindergarten to grade 12.

The community (misspelled as "Recontre East") is notable as the only location excluded by name from Canadian Tire's ship-to-home service for large items, which is available to any other location within a 100 kilometre radius of a Canadian Tire store. Rencontre East is approximately 50 kilometres away from the Canadian Tire store in Marystown as the crow flies, but as noted previously it is only reachable by ferry.

== Demographics ==
In the 2021 Census of Population conducted by Statistics Canada, Rencontre East had a population of 115 living in 46 of its 75 total private dwellings, a change of −17.3% from its 2016 population of 139. With a land area of 2.56 km^{2} (0.99 sq mi), it had a population density of 44.9/km^{2} (116.3/sq mi) in 2021.

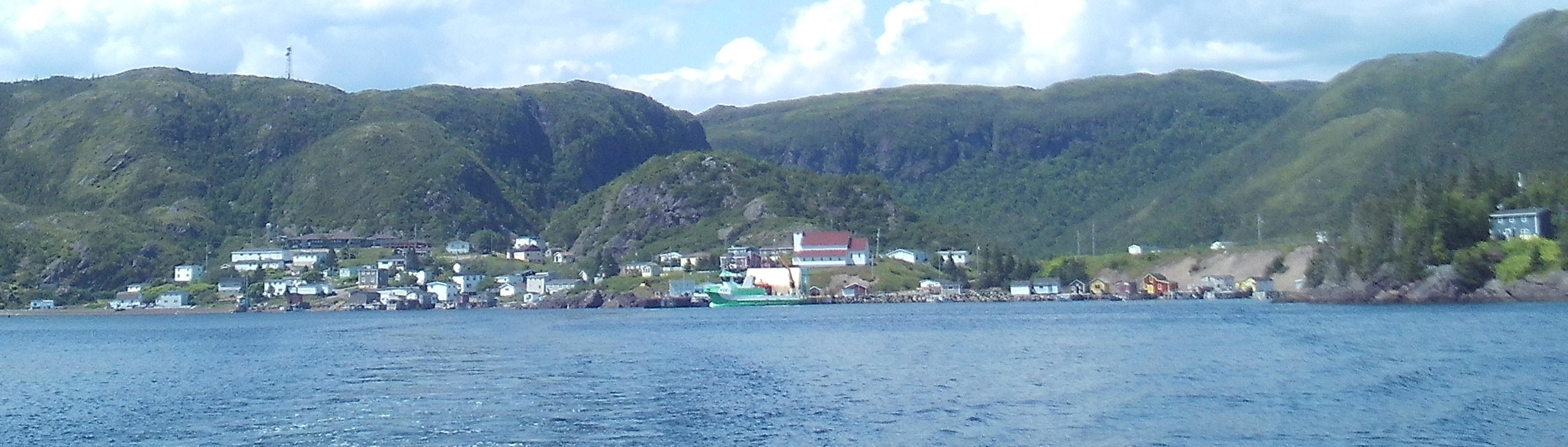
Panorama of Rencontre East.

== See also ==
- List of cities and towns in Newfoundland and Labrador
- Newfoundland outport
