= Harbour Breton =

- Town
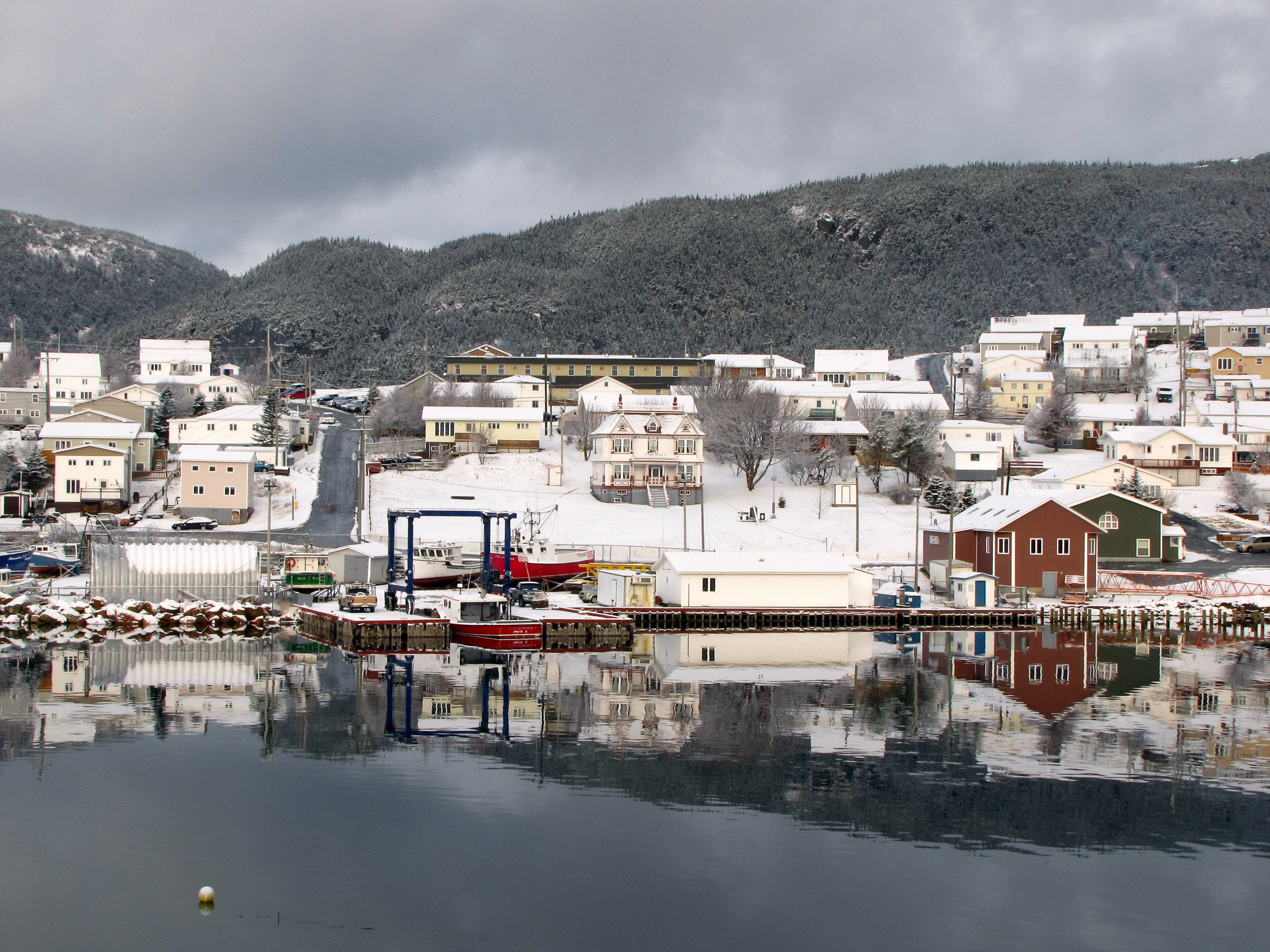

- Location of Harbour Breton in Newfoundland
- Coordinates: 47°29′N 55°50′W
- Country: Canada
- Province: Newfoundland and Labrador

Government
  - Mayor: Lloyd Blake
  - MHA: Elvis Loveless

Population (2021)
  - Total: 1,477
  - Density: 118.9/km^{2} (308/sq mi)
- Time zone: UTC-3:30 (Newfoundland Time)
  - Summer (DST): UTC-2:30 (Newfoundland Daylight)
- Area code: 709
- Highways: Route 360
- Website: www.harbourbreton.com

Harbour Breton is a small fishing community on the Connaigre Peninsula in Fortune Bay, on the south coast of the island of Newfoundland in Canada. It is the largest center on the Connaigre Peninsula and was long considered the unofficial capital of Fortune Bay. During the 1960s many communities were resettled into Harbour Breton. Harbour Breton is the only administrative centre in Fortune Bay and is located approximately 220 kilometres (140 mi) south of Grand Falls-Windsor.

== History ==
Harbour Breton is known for its rich fishing history. However, the first major company to take up post here was Newman & Co. Based in England and famous for its port wine, this company happened upon the value of the town's marine climate in its wine aging process.

The Newman Company's ship Retriever arrived in Harbour Breton with a cargo of port wine around 1892. Through the 19th century, the company relied heavily on the importing of fishing servants from England and Ireland.

By 1871, the Newman & Co. employed about 100 people in salting, drying, packing, and shipping fish to Europe, Brazil and the West Indies.

By the late 1800s, a large part of the population had either settled in Harbour Breton permanently, moved to other areas on the south coast which were connected with the Newman & Co. or returned to their country of origin. By 1891, Harbour Breton's population had reached 484. Of them, 443 were Newfoundland born with the remainder from England, Ireland, Scotland and other British colonies. Newman & Co. fortunes declined in the early 1900s and the company closed its operation in 1907.

A cottage hospital was built in Harbour Breton in 1936. Harbour Breton was designated as a growth centre in 1965 and the government encouraged people living in isolated communities to relocate to the town. From 1965 to 1971, a total of 700 people had moved to Harbour Breton. Many residents resettled from Sagona Island, Jersey Harbour, Little Bay West, Miller's Passage, Red Cove, and Grole. In 1971, Harbour Breton was linked to Trans Canada Highway by road.

In 1973, a landslide on south side of Harbour Breton, killed 4 children from the Hickey family. A monument was erected on the site of the Hickey house in 1997.

Harbour Breton has a notable fishing history, including companies such as Fishery Products International (FPI), which removed itself from the town in April 2005. The Barry Group of Companies Inc. renovated the plant used by FPI and re-opened its doors in December 2006. Cooke Aquaculture started a salmon processing operation in Harbour Breton at the Barry Group of Companies plant in 2008. The plant employed about 150 people, but it closed on January 31, 2014 when the Barry Group didn't renew its lease with Cooke Aquaculture. Barry Group Inc. opened a fish meal plant in Harbour Breton in 2017.

== Climate ==
Climate data for Harbour Breton
Month	Jan	Feb	Mar	Apr	May	Jun	Jul	Aug	Sep	Oct	Nov	Dec	Year
Record high °C (°F)	12.5 (54.5)	11.0 (51.8)	16.0 (60.8)	17.0 (62.6)	20.5 (68.9)	25.5 (77.9)	26.0 (78.8)	27.5 (81.5)	26.5 (79.7)	22.0 (71.6)	17.0 (62.6)	12.0 (53.6)	27.5 (81.5)
Mean daily maximum °C (°F)	−0.5 (31.1)	−0.8 (30.6)	1.3 (34.3)	5.5 (41.9)	10.0 (50.0)	13.4 (56.1)	17.0 (62.6)	18.7 (65.7)	15.9 (60.6)	11.1 (52.0)	6.5 (43.7)	2.4 (36.3)	8.4 (47.1)
Daily mean °C (°F)	−4.1 (24.6)	−4.3 (24.3)	−2.0 (28.4)	2.4 (36.3)	6.5 (43.7)	10.1 (50.2)	14.1 (57.4)	15.9 (60.6)	13.0 (55.4)	8.2 (46.8)	3.6 (38.5)	−0.8 (30.6)	5.2 (41.4)
Mean daily minimum °C (°F)	−7.6 (18.3)	−7.8 (18.0)	−5.3 (22.5)	−0.6 (30.9)	3.0 (37.4)	6.8 (44.2)	11.2 (52.2)	13.1 (55.6)	9.9 (49.8)	5.4 (41.7)	0.7 (33.3)	−3.9 (25.0)	2.1 (35.8)
Record low °C (°F)	−19.0 (−2.2)	−24.0 (−11.2)	−23.0 (−9.4)	−14.0 (6.8)	−6.0 (21.2)	−0.5 (31.1)	2.5 (36.5)	4.5 (40.1)	−1.0 (30.2)	−5.5 (22.1)	−12.0 (10.4)	−18.0 (−0.4)	−24.0 (−11.2)
Average precipitation mm (inches)	111.7 (4.40)	120.2 (4.73)	102.2 (4.02)	125.3 (4.93)	117.4 (4.62)	138.3 (5.44)	119.1 (4.69)	93.0 (3.66)	139.5 (5.49)	147.2 (5.80)	149.8 (5.90)	121.5 (4.78)	1,485.1 (58.47)
Average rainfall mm (inches)	63.2 (2.49)	83.1 (3.27)	77.3 (3.04)	117.7 (4.63)	116.2 (4.57)	138.3 (5.44)	119.1 (4.69)	93.0 (3.66)	139.5 (5.49)	147.1 (5.79)	143.3 (5.64)	86.7 (3.41)	1,324.4 (52.14)
Average snowfall cm (inches)	48.5 (19.1)	37.1 (14.6)	24.9 (9.8)	7.6 (3.0)	1.2 (0.5)	0.0 (0.0)	0.0 (0.0)	0.0 (0.0)	0.0 (0.0)	0.1 (0.0)	6.5 (2.6)	34.8 (13.7)	160.7 (63.3)
Source: Environment Canada

== Demographics ==
In the 2021 Census of Population conducted by Statistics Canada, Harbour Breton had a population of 1,477 living in 632 of its 699 total private dwellings, a change of −9.6% from its 2016 population of 1,634. With a land area of 13.82 km^{2} (5.34 sq mi), it had a population density of 106.9/km^{2} (276.8/sq mi) in 2021.

== See also ==
- Hermitage Bay
- List of cities and towns in Newfoundland and Labrador
- Newfoundland outport
- Resettlement (Newfoundland)
