= National Foundation for Popular Culture =

Non-profit organization in Puerto Rico

- Founded: August 1996 (30 years ago)
- Purpose: Puerto Rican culture
- Location: San Juan, Puerto Rico
- Key people: Javier Santiago, President
- Website: prpop.org

The National Foundation for Popular Culture —Spanish: Fundación Nacional para la Cultura Popular (FNCP)— is a non-profit organization focused on the popular culture of Puerto Rico.

The foundation seeks to advance the development of the Puerto Rican popular culture through the study, promotion and sponsorship of cultural events and the artists that expose it. Its goal is to organize, research, study, archive, publish, catalogue, disseminate, foment competition, conserve, foment the production of, promote, exhibit, and exchange subjects of popular culture, classical, and folk of Puerto Rico. The foundation's extensive archive includes store records in all formats, radio recordings, interviews, photos, negatives, videos in various formats, propaganda advertising, magazines, artwork, paintings, and other collectibles.
