= English Harbour West =

Coordinates: 47°27′44″N 55°29′45″W

English Harbour West is a village located on the south west shore of Fortune Bay. It is noted for its bank fishing and inshore fishing. The Way Office was established on April 1, 1866. The first Way Master was Albert Stirling. In 1891, it became a Post Office town and William Evans was the first Postmaster.

English Harbour West is now a part of the Town of St. Jacques-Coomb's Cove.

Fitzgerald Academy, a kindergarten to 12th grade school, is located in English Harbour West.
