= Belleoram =

- Town
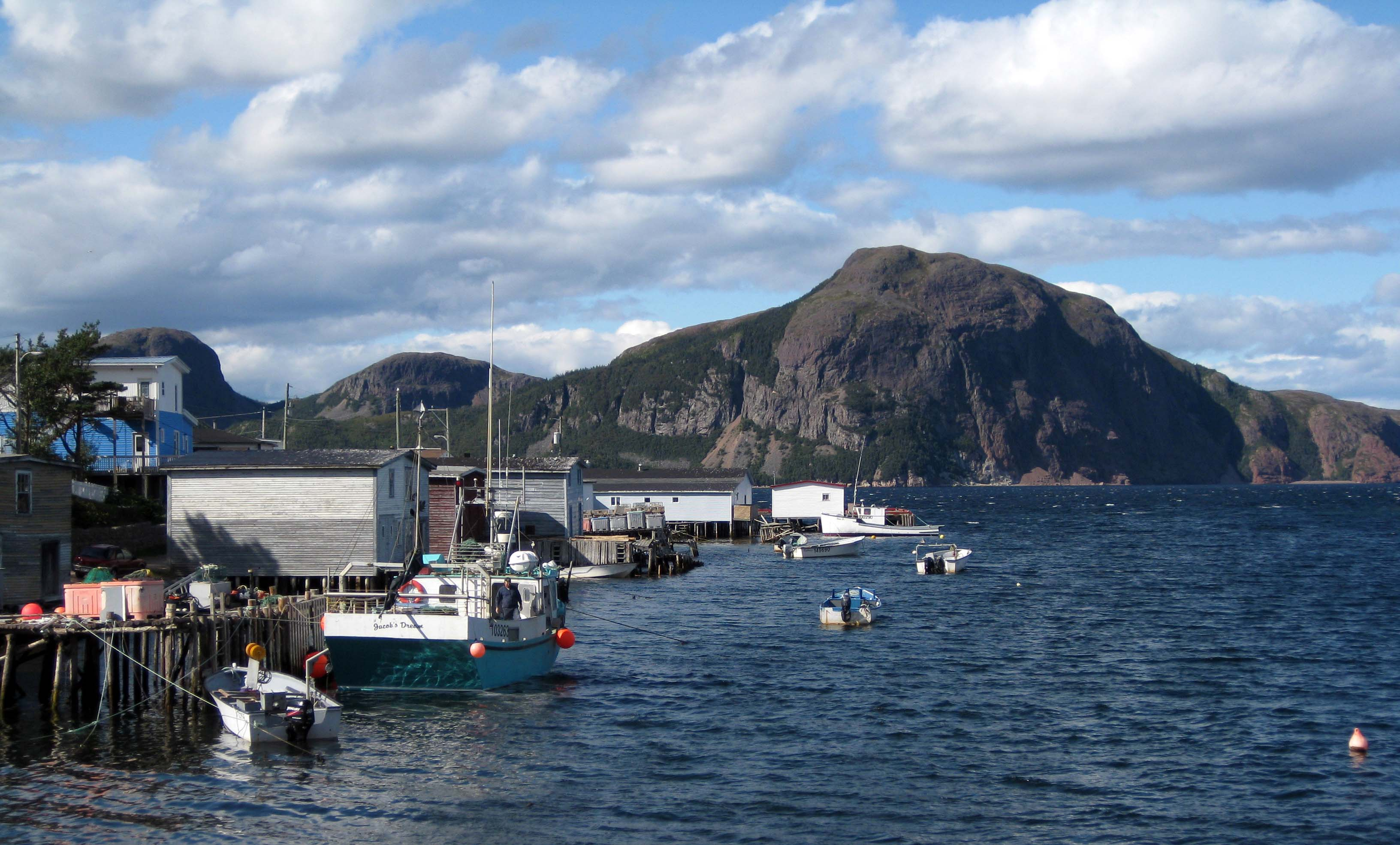

- Location of Belleoram in Newfoundland
- Coordinates: 47°31′22″N 55°24′39″W
- Country: Canada
- Province: Newfoundland and Labrador

Government
  - Mayor: Daniel Leights

Area
  - Land: 2.11 km^{2} (0.81 sq mi)

Population (2021)
  - Total: 348
  - Density: 177.3/km^{2} (459/sq mi)
- the 1921 Census recorded 698 persons in 140 households
- Time zone: UTC-3:30 (Newfoundland Time)
  - Summer (DST): UTC-2:30 (Newfoundland Daylight)
- Area code: 709
- Highways: Route 362

Belleoram (/bəˈlɔːrəm/) is a village on the shores of Fortune Bay in the Canadian province of Newfoundland and Labrador.

The community sits on a narrow strip of land hemmed in between the bay and the steep hills that rise behind it. Belleoram has a large harbour and shelter from the sea, with the protection of a natural breakwater.

== History ==
Belleoram, a fishing community, had a fish plant, which closed in 1989. Aquaculture and fish farming are important economic drivers.

Belleoram dates back to 1774. The French used the area and called it "Bande de Laurier". By 1713, the Treaty of Utrecht had forced the French to leave. In 1718, Captain Tavenor sailed around the south of Newfoundland and called it "Belorme's Place". In the 17th century, a French adventurer wintered there for 20 years, and he was the first to name the community Belleoram.

=== Cluett House Registered Heritage Structure ===
Cluett House was designated a Registered Heritage Structure by the Heritage Foundation of Newfoundland and Labrador in 1992 because of its historic and aesthetic value.

A Dorchester man named Parsons is said to be the first English settler in Belleoram, followed by another Dorchester man named John Cluett Sr. Other people came from the west of England as servants to the early planters.

The Cluett House, which is over 150 years old, is constructed mainly of original timber. In 1994, the property was one of the recipients of the Manning Awards for Excellence in the Public Presentation of Historic Places.

It underwent a significant maintenance project in 2019, with a damaged wall structure repaired and shingle cladding refreshed. Cluett House is also designated as a heritage building by the Town of Belleoram under the Urban and Rural Planning Act and Municipalities Act.

== Demographics ==
In the 2021 Census of Population conducted by Statistics Canada, Belleoram had a population of 348, living in 142 of its 170 total private dwellings, a change of −7% from its 2016 population of 374. With a land area of 2.2 km^{2} (0.85 sq mi), it had a population density of 158.2/km^{2} (409.7/sq mi) in 2021.

== Attractions ==
The Anglican Church in Belleoram, locally known as the "Cathedral of the South Coast", was built in 1891 and consecrated as St. Lawrence Church in 1901. The Church is representative of Gothic architecture, a style developed in Western Europe between the 12th and 16th centuries.

The Ironskull Folk Festival is an annual event held the third weekend of July every year. The festival showcases the area's musical talent and is a collaboration among many Newfoundland artists. The Ironskull Festival takes its name from the mountain located across the harbour. A trail provides visitors with the opportunity to hike to the summit and view the surrounding coastline.

== See also ==
- Cluett House Registered Heritage Structure
- Frances Cluett
- Newfoundland outport
- Simani
