= Fortune Bay =

Body of water on the south coast of Newfoundland, Canada

Location of Fortune Bay in Newfoundland

Fortune Bay (French: baie Fortune) is a fairly large natural bay located in the Gulf of St. Lawrence on the south coast of Newfoundland, Canada. The Bay is bounded by Point Crewe (46°57′08″N 55°59′19″W) on the Burin Peninsula and Pass Island (47°28′56″N 56°11′52″W) at the entrance to Hermitage Bay to the northwest for a distance of 56 kilometers. The bay extends in a northeast direction for 105 kilometers ending at Terrenceville.

Within Fortune Bay there are also a number of inner bays and coves including, Connaigre Bay, Great Bay de l'Eau, Belle Bay and Long Harbour. There are a number of islands located in the bay, of which the largest is Brunette Island. Some of the other islands include Sagona Island, Great Island, St. John's Island, Chapel Island and Petticoat Island.

It is believed that the name Fortune Bay is derived from the Portuguese word fortuna meaning place of good fortune. It is also one of the oldest surviving names in Newfoundland when it appeared on Maggiolo's map from 1527.

The Geological stage Fortunian is named after Fortune Bay and Fortune. The GSSP is located at Fortune Head.

== Settlements ==
- Terrenceville
- Bay L'Argent
- Little Harbour East
- Harbour Mille
- St. Bernard's
- Jacques Fontaine
- Grand le Pierre
- English Harbour East
- Rencontre East
- Pool's Cove
- Belleoram
- English Harbour West
- Harbour Breton
- Bay d'Est
- Little Bay East

== See also ==
- List of communities in Newfoundland and Labrador
