= Environmental issues with coral reefs =

Factors which adversely affect tropical coral reefs

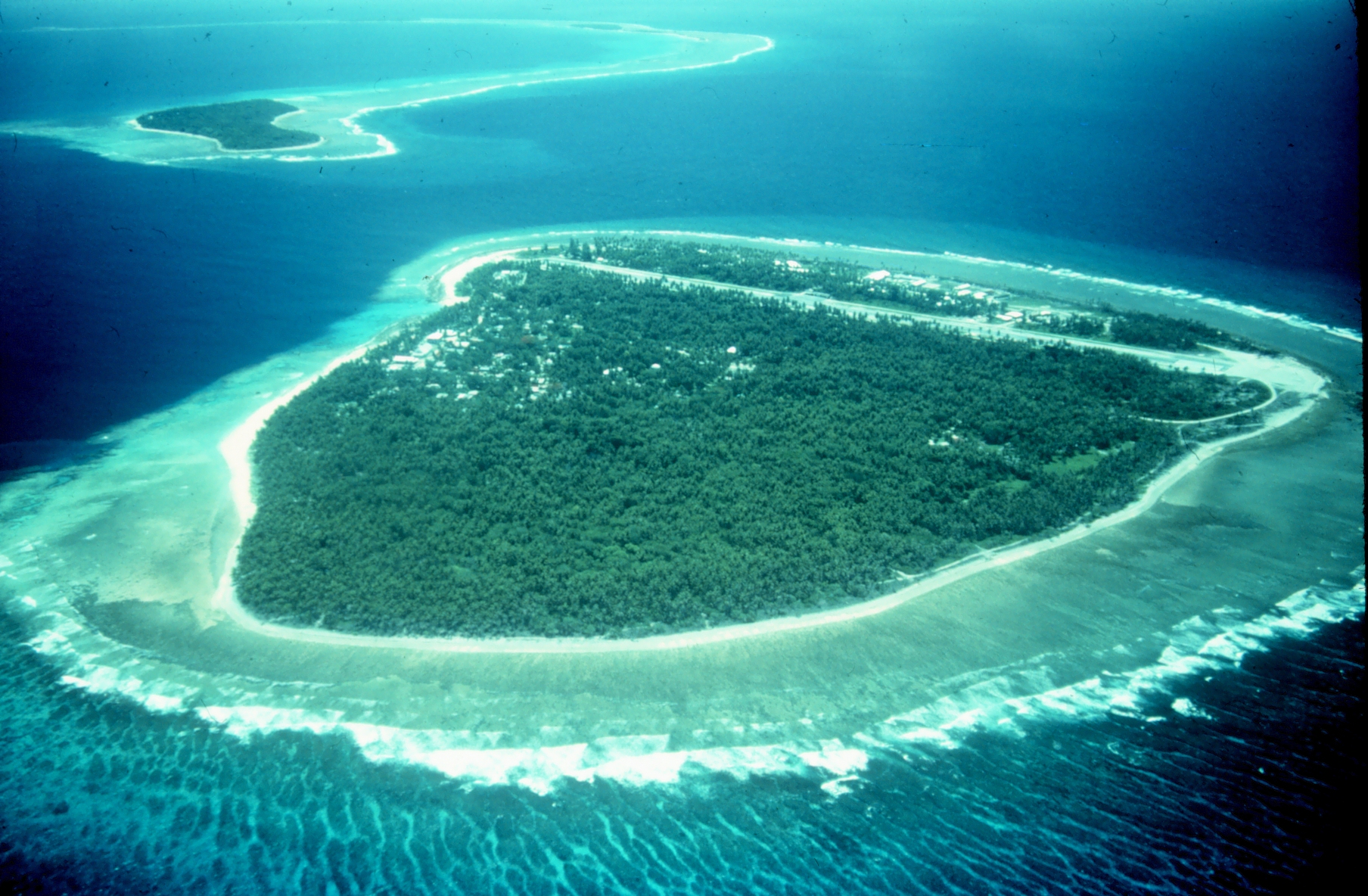
Island (Falalop) with fringing reef off Yap, Micronesia. Coral reefs are dying around the world.

Human activities have substantial impact on coral reefs, contributing to their worldwide decline. Damaging activities encompass coral mining, pollution (both organic and non-organic), overfishing, blast fishing, as well as the excavation of canals and access points to islands and bays. Additional threats comprise disease, destructive fishing practices, and the warming of oceans. Furthermore, the ocean's function as a carbon dioxide sink, alterations in the atmosphere, ultraviolet light, ocean acidification, viral infections, the repercussions of dust storms transporting agents to distant reefs, pollutants, and algal blooms represent some of the factors exerting influence on coral reefs. Importantly, the jeopardy faced by coral reefs extends far beyond coastal regions. The ramifications of climate change, notably global warming, induce an elevation in ocean temperatures that triggers coral bleaching—a potentially lethal phenomenon for coral ecosystems.

Scientists estimate that between 2020 and 2040, about 70 to 90% of all coral reefs will disappear, with primary causes being warming ocean waters, ocean acidity, and pollution. Others believe that the mass mortality events over this time frame will give way to the expansion of thermally tolerant mutant populations, but at the cost of coral genetic diversity. In 2008, a worldwide study estimated that 19% of the existing area of coral reefs had already been lost. Less than 20% of the world's reefs could be currently regarded as in good health and about 75% of the world's reefs may be at risk due to destructive, human-related activities. The threat to the health of reefs is particularly strong in Southeast Asia, where 95% of reefs are endangered. By the 2030s, 90% of reefs are expected to be at risk from both human activities and climate change; by 2050, it is predicted that all coral reefs will be in danger.

== Issues ==
=== Competition ===
In the Caribbean Sea and tropical Pacific Ocean, direct contact between coral and common seaweeds causes bleaching and death of coral tissue via allelopathic competition. The lipid-soluble extracts of seaweeds that harmed coral tissues, also produced rapid bleaching. At these sites, bleaching and mortality was limited to areas of direct contact with seaweed or their extracts. The seaweed then expanded to occupy the dead coral's habitat. However, as of 2009, only 4% of coral reefs worldwide had more than 50% algal coverage which means that there are no recent global trend towards algal dominance over coral reefs.

Competitive seaweed and other algae thrive in nutrient-rich waters in the absence of sufficient herbivorous predators. Herbivores include fish such as parrotfish, the urchin Diadema antillarum, surgeonfishes, tangs and unicornfishes.

=== Predation ===
Overfishing, particularly selective overfishing, can unbalance coral ecosystems by encouraging the excessive growth of coral predators. Predators that eat living coral, such as the crown-of-thorns starfish, are called corallivores. Coral reefs are built from stony coral, which evolved with large amounts of the wax cetyl palmitate in their tissues. Most predators find this wax indigestible. The crown-of-thorns starfish is a large (up to one meter) starfish protected by long, venomous spines. Its enzyme system dissolves the wax in stony corals, and allows the starfish to feed on the living animal. Starfish face predators of their own, such as the giant triton sea snail. However, the giant triton is valued for its shell and has been over fished. As a result, crown-of-thorns starfish populations can periodically grow unchecked, devastating reefs.

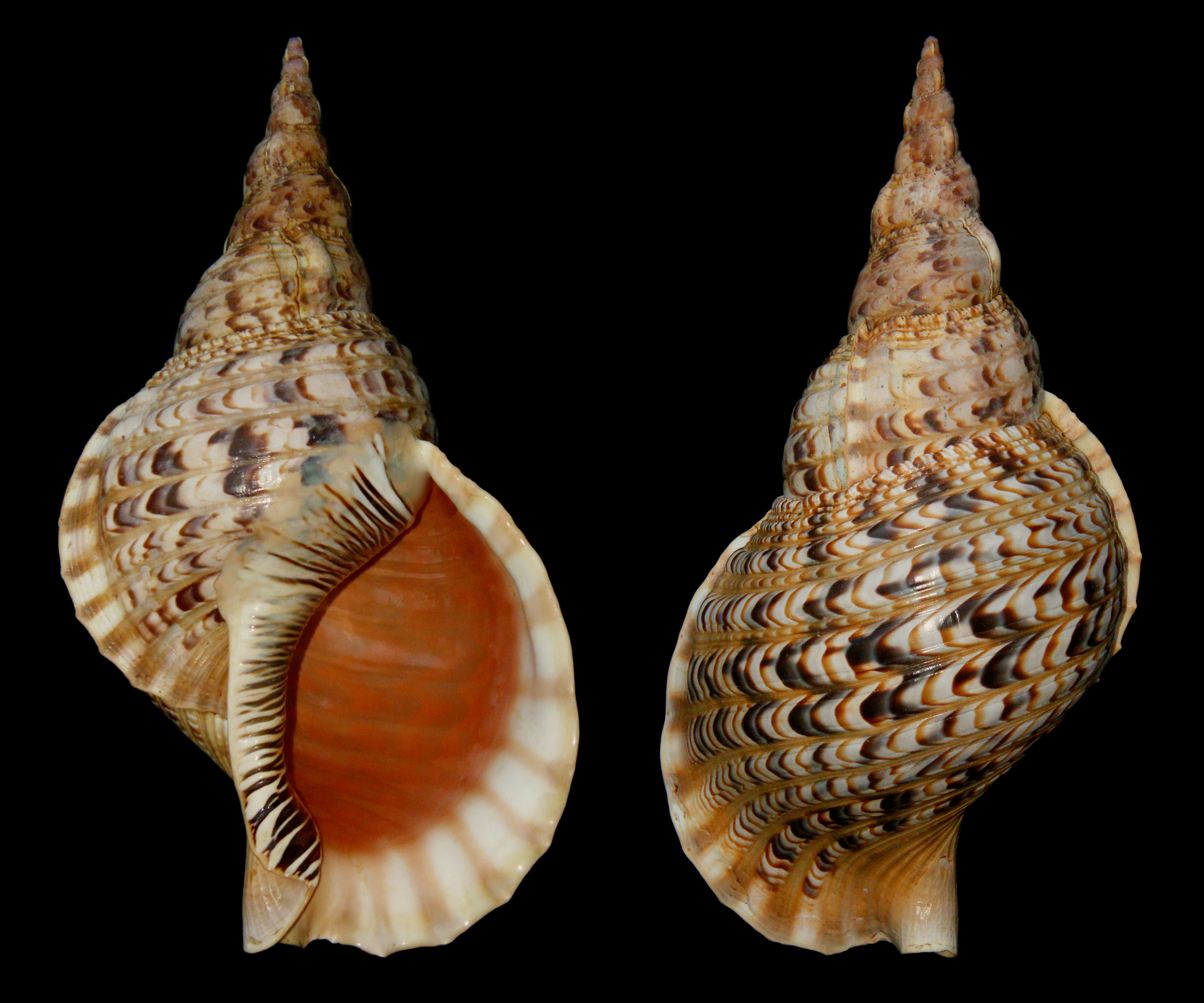
The overfished giant triton eats the crown-of-thorns starfish.

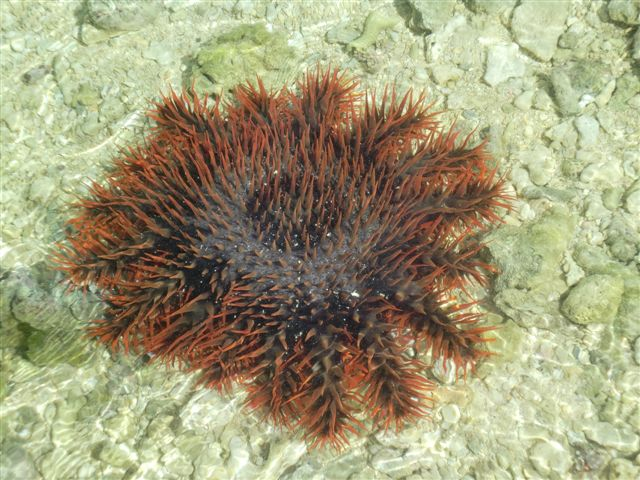
The crown-of-thorns starfish eats coral.

=== Fishing practices ===
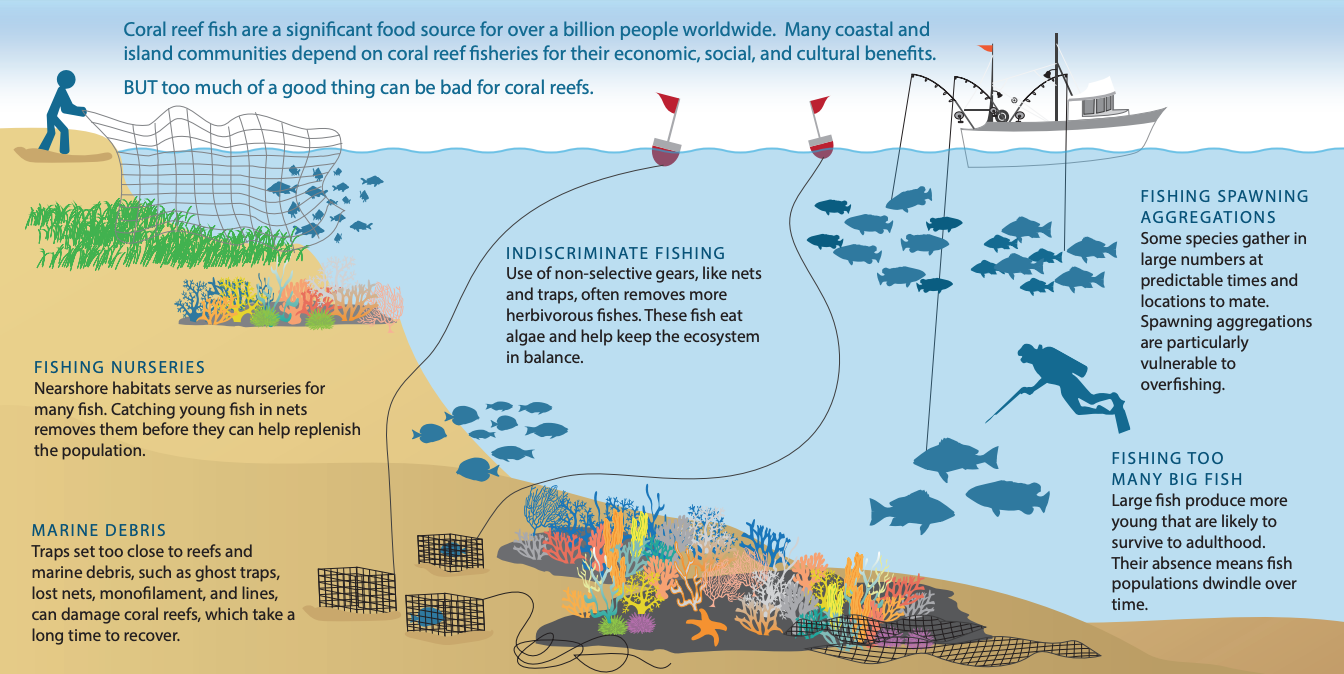
Overfishing threats to coral reefs – NOAA

Although some marine aquarium fish species can reproduce in aquaria (such as Pomacentridae), most (95%) are collected from coral reefs. Intense harvesting, especially in maritime Southeast Asia (including Indonesia and the Philippines), damages the reefs. This is aggravated by destructive fishing practices, such as cyanide and blast fishing. Most (80–90%) aquarium fish from the Philippines are captured with sodium cyanide. This toxic chemical is dissolved in sea water and released into areas where fish shelter. It narcotizes the fish, which are then easily captured. However, most fish collected with cyanide die a few months later from liver damage. Moreover, many non-marketable specimens die in the process. It is estimated that 4,000 or more Filipino fish collectors have used over 1,000,000 kilograms (2,200,000 lb) of cyanide on Philippine reefs alone, about 150,000 kg per year. A major catalyst of cyanide fishing is poverty within fishing communities. In countries like the Philippines that regularly employ cyanide, more than thirty percent of the population lives below the poverty line.

Dynamite fishing is another destructive method for gathering fish. Sticks of dynamite, grenades, or homemade explosives are detonated in the water. This method of fishing kills the fish within the main blast area, along with many unwanted reef animals. The blast also kills the corals in the area, eliminating the reef's structure, destroying habitat for the remaining fish and other animals important for reef health. Muro-ami is the destructive practice of covering reefs with nets and dropping large stones onto the reef to produce a flight response among the fish. The stones break and kill the coral. Muro-ami was generally outlawed in the 1980s.

Fishing gear damages reefs via direct physical contact with the reef structure and substrate. They are typically made of synthetic materials that do not deteriorate in the ocean, causing a lasting effect on the ecosystem and reefs. Gill nets, fish traps, and anchors break branching coral and cause coral death through entanglement. When fishermen drop lines by coral reefs, the lines entangle the coral. The fisher cuts the line and abandons it, leaving it attached to the reef. The discarded lines abrade coral polyps and upper tissue layers. Corals are able to recover from small lesions, but larger and recurrent damage complicates recovery.

Bottom dragging gear such as beach seines can damage corals by abrasion and fracturing. A beach seine is a long net about 150 meters (490 ft) with a mesh size of 3 centimeters (1.2 in) and a weighted line to hold the net down while it is dragged across the substrate and is one of the most destructive types of fishing gear on Kenya's reefs.

Bottom trawling in deep oceans destroys cold-water and deep-sea corals. Historically, industrial fishers avoided coral because their nets would get caught on the reefs. In the 1980s, "rock-hopper" trawls attached large tires and rollers to allow the nets to roll over rough surfaces. Fifty-five percent of Alaskan cold-water coral that was damaged by one pass from a bottom trawl had not recovered a year later. Northeast Atlantic reefs bear scars up to 4 kilometers (2.5 mi) long. In Southern Australia, 90 percent of the surfaces on coral seamounts are now bare rock. Even in the Great Barrier Reef World Heritage Area, seafloor trawling for prawns and scallops is causing localized extinction of some coral species.

"With increased human population and improved storage and transport systems, the scale of human impacts on reefs has grown exponentially. For example, markets for fish and other natural resources have become global, supplying demand for reef resources."

=== Marine pollution ===
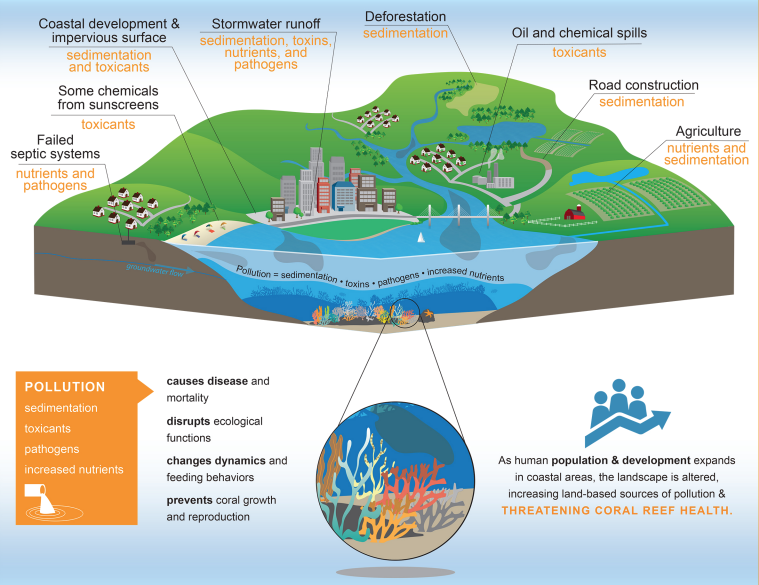
Land-based sources of pollution threats to coral reefs – NOAA

Reefs in close proximity to human populations are subject to poor water quality from land- and marine-based sources. In 2006 studies suggested that approximately 80 percent of ocean pollution originates from activities on land. Pollution arrives from land via runoff, the wind and "injection" (deliberate introduction, e.g., drainpipes). Runoff brings with it sediment from erosion and land-clearing, nutrients and pesticides from agriculture, wastewater, industrial effluent and miscellaneous material such as petroleum residue and trash that storms wash away. Some pollutants consume oxygen and lead to eutrophication, killing coral and other reef inhabitants.

An increasing fraction of the global population lives in coastal areas. Without appropriate precautions, development (e.g., buildings and paved roads) increases the fraction of rainfall and other water sources that enter the ocean as runoff by decreasing the land's ability to absorb it.

Pollution can introduce pathogens. For example, Aspergillus sydowii has been associated with a disease in sea fans, and Serratia marcescens, has been linked to the coral disease white pox.

Reefs near human populations can be faced with local stresses, including poor water quality from land-based sources of pollution. Copper, a common industrial pollutant has been shown to interfere with the life history and development of coral polyps.

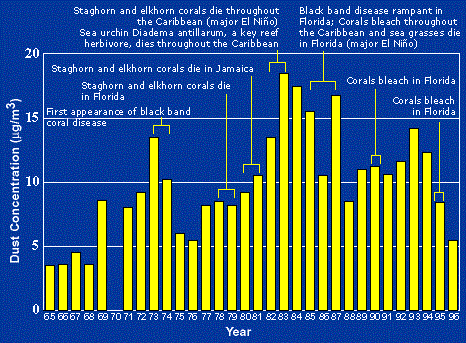
Barbados dust graph.

In addition to runoff, wind blows material into the ocean. This material may be local or from other regions. For example, dust from the Sahara moves to the Caribbean and Florida. Dust also blows from the Gobi and Taklamakan deserts across Korea, Japan, and the Northern Pacific to the Hawaiian Islands. Since 1970, dust deposits have grown due to drought periods in Africa. Dust transport to the Caribbean and Florida varies from year to year with greater flux during positive phases of the North Atlantic Oscillation. The USGS links dust events to reduced health of coral reefs across the Caribbean and Florida, primarily since the 1970s. Dust from the 1883 eruption of Krakatoa in Indonesia appeared in the annular bands of the reef-building coral Montastraea annularis from the Florida Reeftract.

Sediment smothers corals and interferes with their ability to feed and reproduce. Pesticides can interfere with coral reproduction and growth. There are studies that present evidence that chemicals in sunscreens contribute to coral bleaching by lowering the resistance of zooxanthellae to viruses, though these studies showed significant flaws in methodology and did not attempt to replicate the complex environment found in coral reefs.

==== Nutrient pollution ====
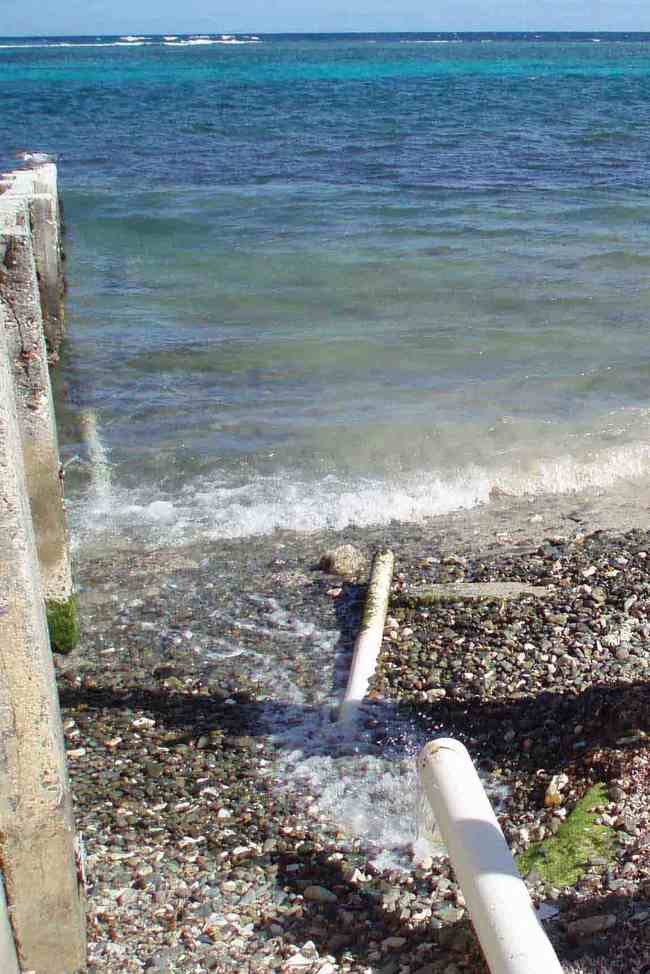

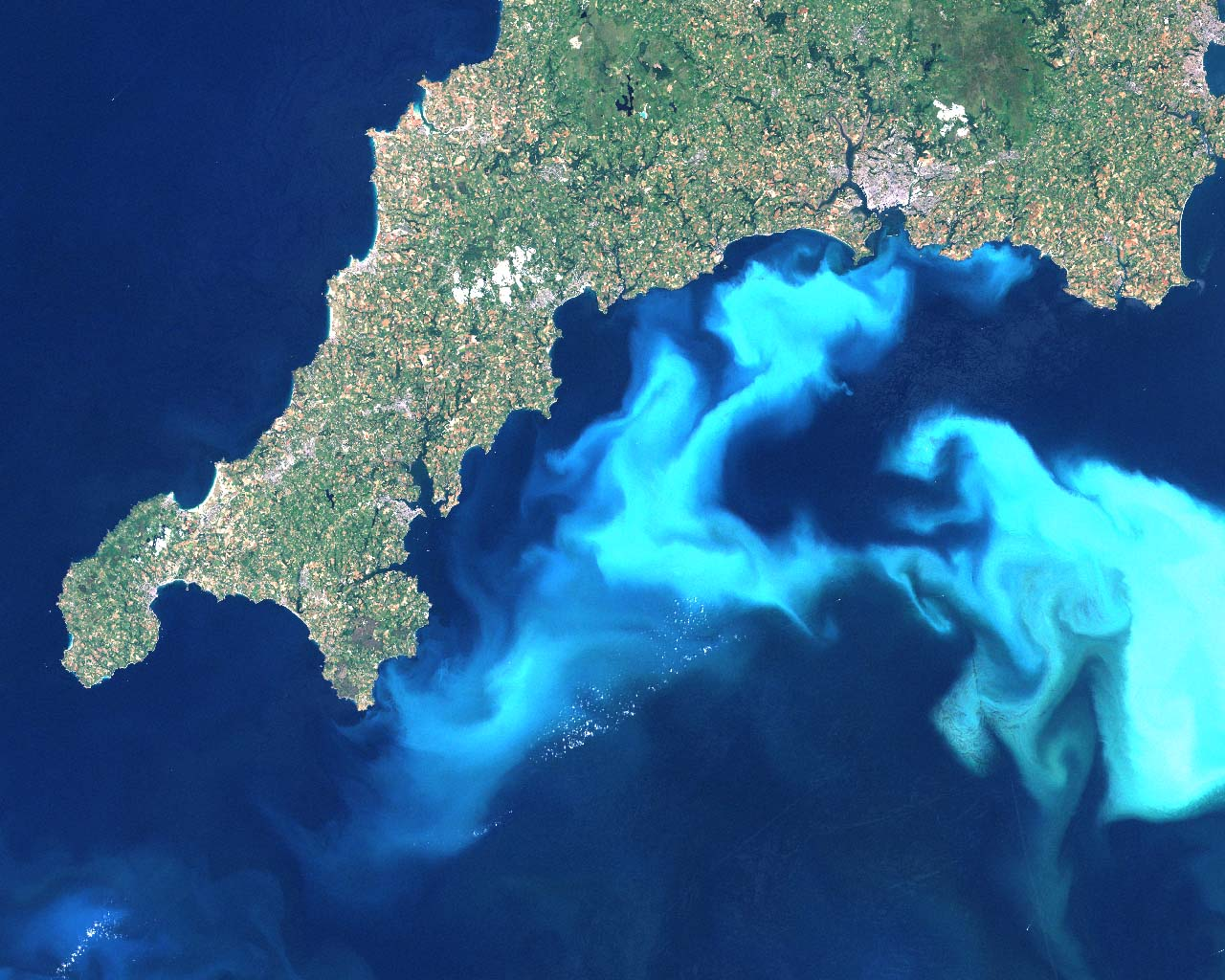
This image of an algae bloom off the southern coast of England, though not in a coral region, shows what a bloom can look like from a satellite remote sensing system.

Nutrient pollution, particularly nitrogen and phosphorus can cause eutrophication, upsetting the balance of the reef by enhancing algal growth and crowding out corals. This nutrient–rich water can enable blooms of fleshy algae and phytoplankton to thrive off coasts. These blooms can create hypoxic conditions by using all available oxygen. Biologically available nitrogen (nitrate plus ammonia) needs to be below 1.0 micromole per liter (less than 0.014 parts per million of nitrogen), and biologically available phosphorus (orthophosphate plus dissolved organic phosphorus) needs to be below 0.1 micromole per liter (less than 0.003 parts per million of phosphorus). In addition concentrations of chlorophyll (in the microscopic plants called phytoplankton) needs to be below 0.5 parts per billion. Both plants also obscure sunlight, killing both fish and coral. High nitrate levels are specifically toxic to corals, while phosphates slow down skeletal growth.

Excess nutrients can intensify existing disease, including potentially doubling the spread of Aspergillosis, a fungal infection that kills soft corals such as sea fans, and increasing yellow band disease, a bacterial infection that kills reef-building hard corals by fifty percent.

==== Air pollution ====
A study released in April 2013 has shown that air pollution can also stunt the growth of coral reefs; researchers from Australia, Panama and the UK used coral records (between 1880 and 2000) from the western Caribbean to show the threat of factors such as coal-burning coal and volcanic eruptions. The researchers state that the study signifies the first time that the relationship between air pollution and coral reefs has been elucidated, while former chair of the Great Barrier Reef Marine Park Authority Ian McPhail referred to the report as "fascinating" upon the public release of its findings.

=== Marine debris ===
Marine debris is defined as any persistent solid material that is manufactured or processed and directly or indirectly, intentionally or unintentionally, disposed of or abandoned into the marine environment or the Great Lakes. Debris may arrive directly from a ship or indirectly when washed out to sea via rivers, streams, and storm drains. Human-made items tend to be the most harmful such as plastics (from bags to balloons, hard hats to fishing line), glass, metal, rubber (millions of waste tires), and even entire vessels.

Plastic debris can kill and harm multiple reef species. Corals and coral reefs are at higher risk because they are immobile, meaning that when the water quality or other changes in their habitat occur, corals cannot move to a different place; they must adapt or they will not survive. There are two different classes of plastics, macro and microplastics and both types can cause damage in a number of ways. For example, macroplastics such as derelict (abandoned) fishing nets and other gear—often called "ghost nets" can still catch fish and other marine life and kill those organisms and break or damage reefs. Large items such as abandoned fishing nets are known as macroplastics whereas microplastics are plastic fragments that are typically less than or equal to 5 mm in length and have primarily been found to cause damage to coral reefs though corals ingesting these plastic fragments.Fig. 1. Video frame sequence of capture and ingestion of a microplastic particle by a polyp of Astroides calycularis. Obtained from Savinelli et al. (2020)]] Some researchers have found that ingestion of microplastics harms coral, and subsequently coral reefs, because ingesting these fragments reduced coral food intake as well as coral fitness since corals waste a lot of time and energy handling the plastic particles. Unfortunately, even remote reef systems suffer the effects of marine debris, especially if it is plastic pollution. Reefs in the Northwestern Hawaiian Islands are particularly prone to the accumulation of marine debris because of their central location in the North Pacific Gyre. Fortunately, there are solutions to protect corals and coral reefs against the harmful effects of plastic pollution. However, since little to no research exists regarding specific medicinal ways to help corals recover from plastic exposure, the best solution is to not let plastics enter the marine environment at all. This can be accomplished through a number of ways, some of which are already being enacted. For example, there are measures to ban microplastics from products like cosmetics and toothpaste as well as measures that demand for products that contain microplastics to be labeled as such so as to reduce their consumption. Additionally, newer and better detection methods are needed for microplastics and they must be installed at waste water treatment facilities to prevent these particles from entering the marine environment and causing damage to marine life, especially coral reefs. Many people are realizing the problem of plastic pollution and other marine debris though, and have taken steps to mitigate it. For example, from 2000 to 2006, NOAA and partners removed over 500 tons of marine debris from the reefs in the Northwestern Hawaiian Islands.

Cigarette butts also damage aquatic life. In order to avoid cigarette butt litter, some solutions have been proposed, including possibly banning cigarette filters and implementing a deposit system for e-cigarette pods.

=== Dredging ===
Dredging operations are sometimes completed by cutting a path through a coral reef, directly destroying the reef structure and killing any organisms that live on it. Operations that directly destroy coral are often intended to deepen or otherwise enlarge shipping channels or canals, due to the fact that in many areas, removal of coral requires a permit, making it more cost-effective and simple to avoid coral reefs if possible.

Dredging also releases plumes of suspended sediment, which can settle on coral reefs, damaging them by starving them of food and sunlight. Continued exposure to dredging spoil has been shown to increase rates of diseases such as white syndrome, bleaching and sediment necrosis among others. A study conducted in the Montebello and Barrow Islands showed that the number of coral colonies with signs of poor health more than doubled in transects with high exposure to dredging sediment plumes.

=== Sunscreen ===
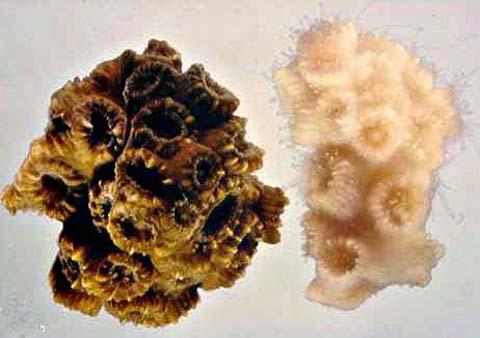
Unbleached and bleached coral.

Sunscreen can enter the ocean indirectly through wastewater systems when it is washed off and from swimmers and divers or directly if the sunscreen comes off people when in the ocean. Some 14,000 tons of sunscreen ends up in the ocean each year, with 4000 to 6000 tons entering reef areas annually. There is an estimate that 90% of snorkeling and diving tourism is concentrated on 10% of the world's coral reefs, meaning that popular reefs are especially vulnerable to sunscreen exposure. Certain formulations of sunscreen are a serious danger to coral health. The common sunscreen ingredient oxybenzone causes coral bleaching and has an impact on other marine fauna. In addition to oxybenzone, there are other sunscreen ingredients, known as chemical UV filters, that can also be harmful to corals and coral reefs and other marine life. They are: Benzophenone-1, Benzophenone-8, OD-PABA, 4-Methylbenzylidene camphor, 3-Benzylidene camphor, nano-Titanium dioxide, nano-Zinc oxide, Octinoxate, and Octocrylene.

In Akumal, Mexico, visitors are warned not to use sunscreen and are kept out of some areas to prevent damage to the coral. In several other tourist destinations, authorities recommend the use of sunscreens prepared with the naturally occurring chemicals titanium dioxide or zinc oxide, or suggest the use of clothing rather than chemicals to screen the skin from the sun. The city of Miami Beach, Florida rejected calls for a ban on sunscreen in 2019 due to lack of evidence. In 2020, Palau enacted a ban on sunscreen and skincare products containing 10 chemicals including oxybenzone. The US state of Hawaii enacted a similar ban which came into effect in 2021. Care should be taken to protect both the marine environment and your skin, as sun exposure causes 90% of premature aging and could cause skin cancer, and it is possible to do both.

=== Climate change ===
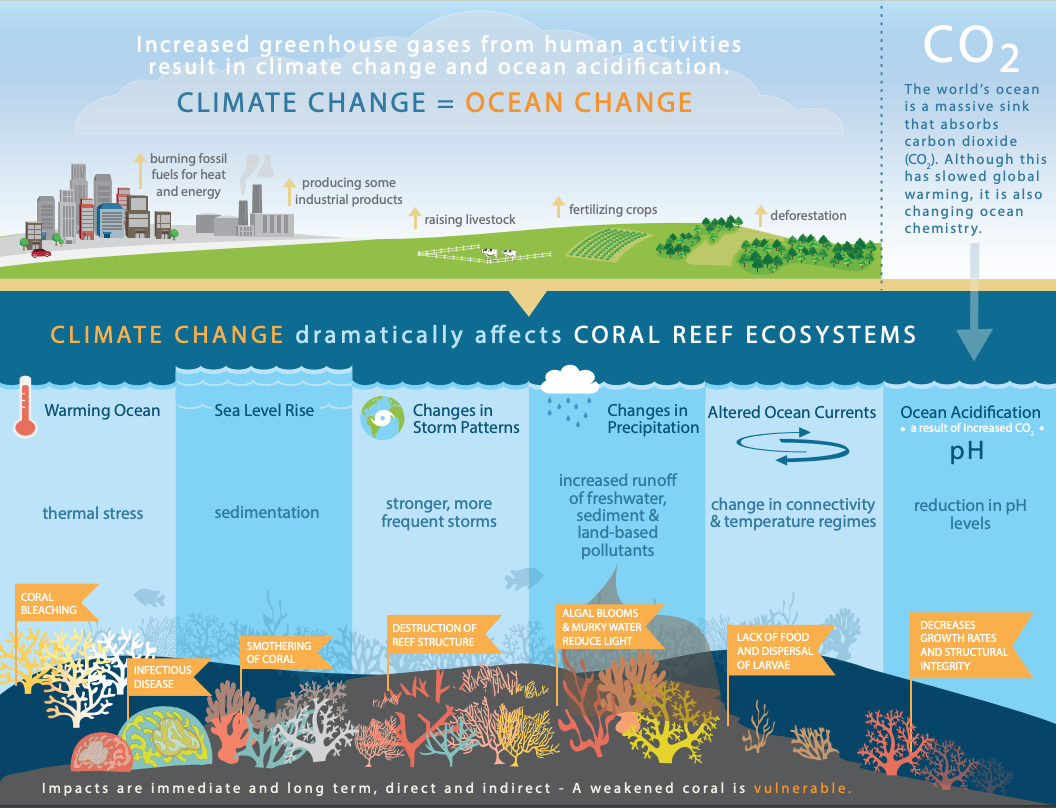
Climate change threats to coral reefs – NOAA

Rising sea levels due to climate change requires coral to grow so the coral can stay close enough to the surface to continue the process of photosynthesis. Water temperature changes or disease of the coral can induce coral bleaching, as happened during the 1998 and 2004 El Niño years, in which sea surface temperatures rose well above normal, bleaching and killing many reefs. Bleaching may be caused by different triggers, including high sea surface temperature (SST), pollution, or other diseases. SST coupled with high irradiance (light intensity), triggers the loss of zooxanthellae, a symbiotic single cell algae that gives the coral its color and the coral's dinoflagellate pigmentation, which turns the coral white when it is expelled, which can kill the coral. Zooxanthellae provide up to 90% of their hosts' energy supply. Healthy reefs can often recover from bleaching if water temperatures cool. However, recovery may not be possible if CO_{2} levels rise to 500 ppm because concentrations of carbonate ions may then be too low. In summary, ocean warming is the primary cause of mass coral bleaching and mortality (very high confidence), which, together with ocean acidification, deteriorates the balance between coral reef construction and erosion (high confidence).

Warming seawater may also welcome the emerging problem of coral disease. Weakened by warm water, coral is much more prone to diseases including black band disease, white band disease and skeletal eroding band. If global temperatures increase by 2 °C during the twenty-first century, coral may not be able to adapt quickly enough to survive.

Warming seawater is also expected to cause migrations in fish populations to compensate for the change. This puts coral reefs and their associated species at risk of invasion and may cause their extinction if they are unable to compete with the invading populations.

A 2010 report by the Institute of Physics predicts that unless the national targets set by the Copenhagen Accord are amended to eliminate loopholes, then by 2100 global temperatures could rise by 4.2 °C and result in an end to coral reefs. Even a temperature rise of just 2 °C, currently very likely to happen in the next 50 years (by 2068), there would be a more than 99% chance that tropical corals would be eradicated.

Warm-water coral reef ecosystems house one-quarter of the marine biodiversity and provide services in the form of food, income and shoreline protection to coastal communities around the world. These ecosystems are threatened by climate and non-climate drivers, especially ocean warming, MHWs, ocean acidification, SLR, tropical cyclones, fisheries/overharvesting, land-based pollution, disease spread and destructive shoreline practices. Warm-water coral reefs face near-term threats to their survival, but research on observed and projected impacts is very advanced.

Anthropogenic climate change has exposed ocean and coastal ecosystems to conditions that are unprecedented over millennia (high confidence), and this has greatly impacted life in the ocean and along its coasts (very high confidence).

=== Ocean acidification ===
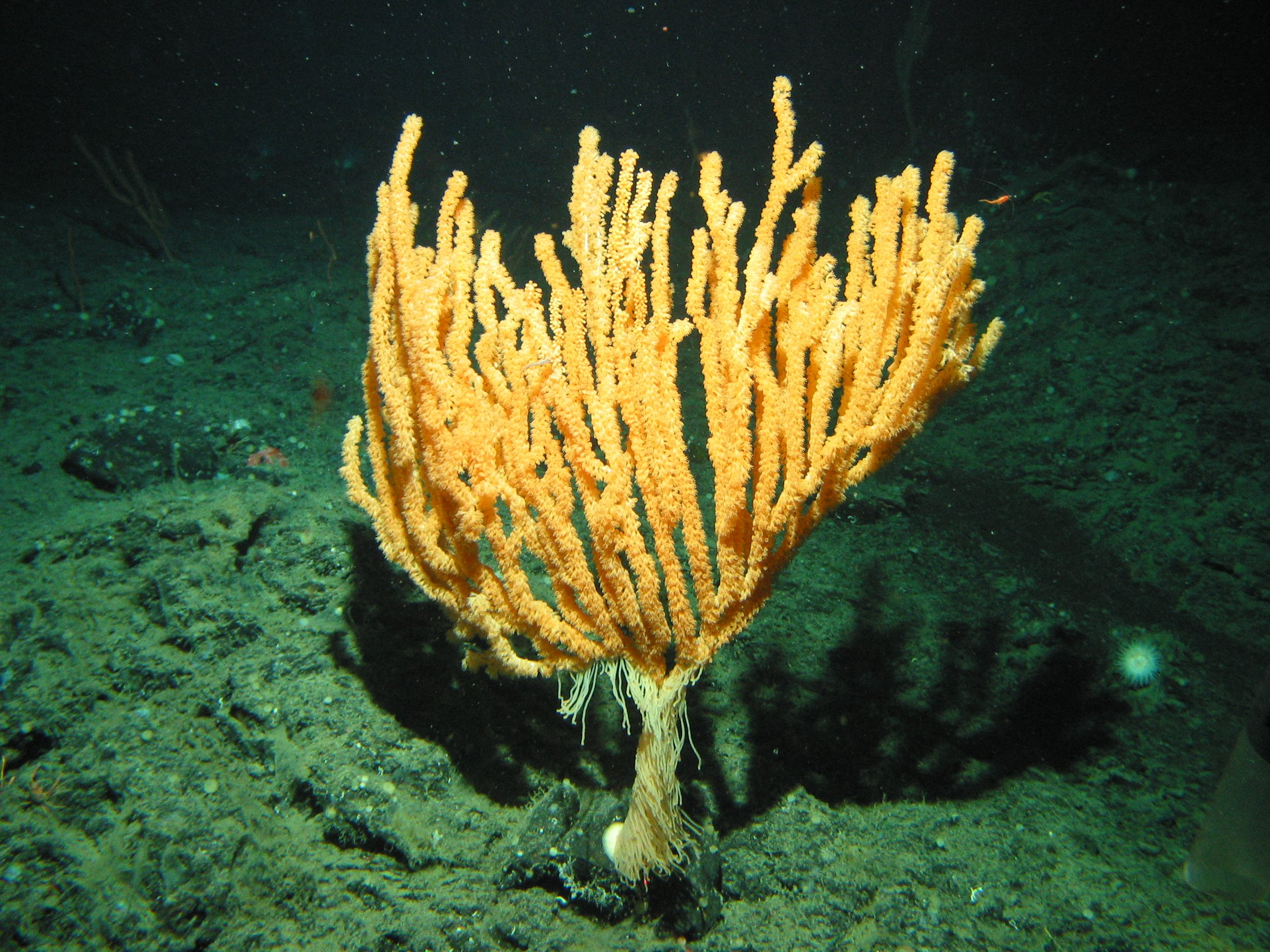
Bamboo coral (Isidella tentaculum) is an early harbinger of ocean acidification

Ocean acidification results from increases in atmospheric carbon dioxide. Oceans absorb around one–third of the increase. The dissolved gas reacts with the water to form carbonic acid, and thus acidifies the ocean. This decreasing pH is another issue for coral reefs.

Ocean surface pH is estimated to have decreased from about 8.25 to 8.14 since the beginning of the industrial era, and a further drop of 0.3–0.4 units is expected. This drop has made it so the amount of hydrogen ions have increased by 30%. Before the industrial age the conditions for calcium carbonate production were typically stable in surface waters since the carbonate ion is at supersaturated concentrations. However, as the ionic concentration falls, carbonate becomes under-saturated, making calcium carbonate structures vulnerable to dissolution. Corals experience reduced calcification or enhanced dissolution when exposed to elevated CO_{2}. This causes the skeletons of the corals to weaken, or even not be made at all. Ocean acidification may also have an effect of 'gender discrimination' as spawning female corals are significantly more susceptible to the negative effects of ocean acidification than spawning male coral

Bamboo coral is a deep water coral which produces growth rings similar to trees. The growth rings illustrate growth rate changes as deep sea conditions change, including changes due to ocean acidification. Specimens as old as 4,000 years have given scientists "4,000 years worth of information about what has been going on in the deep ocean interior".

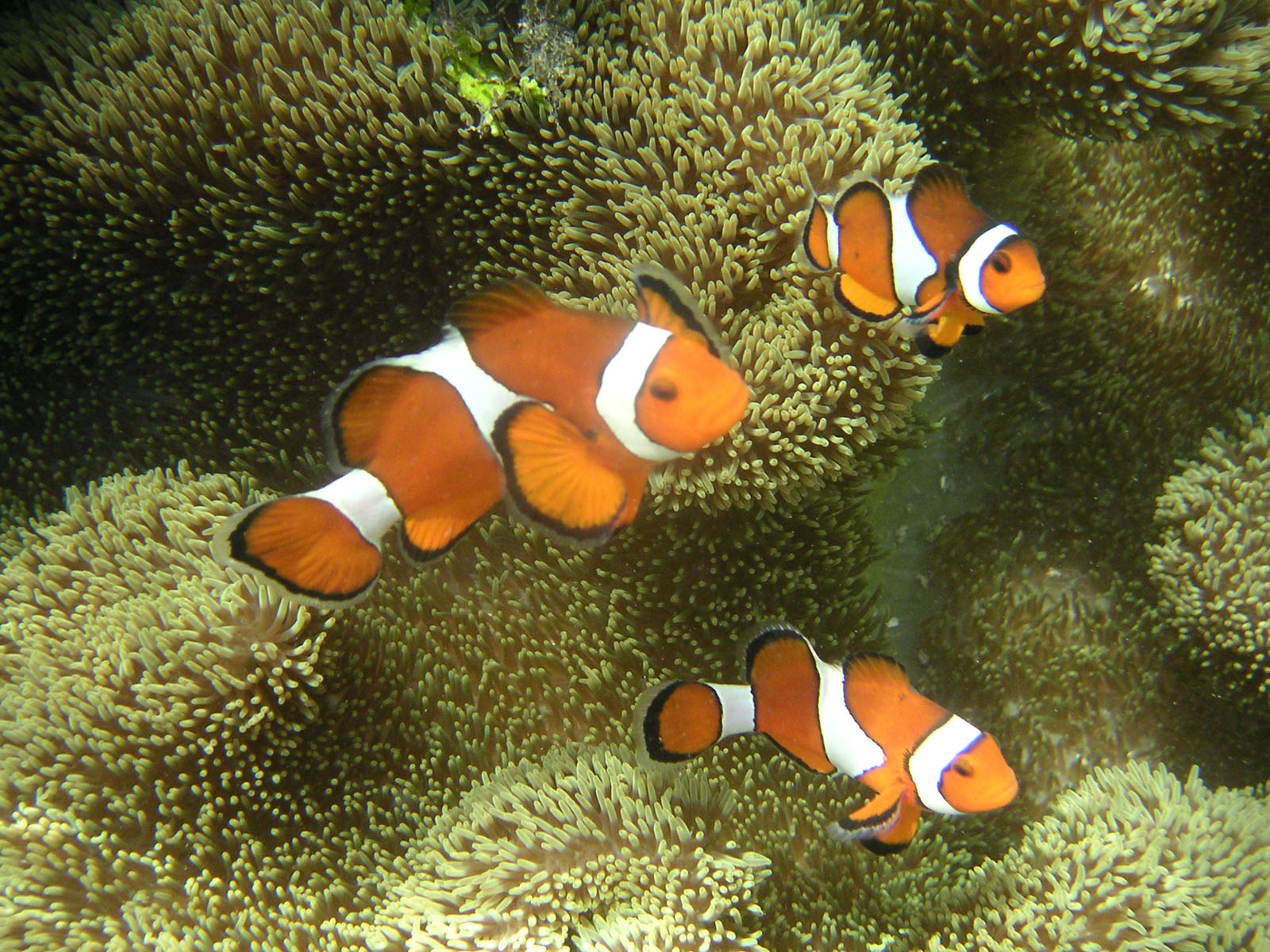
Higher levels of carbon dioxide in the water harms the ability of young clown and damsel fishes to smell and hear

Rising carbon dioxide levels could confuse brain signaling in fish. In 2012, researchers reported on their results after studying the behavior of baby clown and damselfishes for several years in water with elevated levels of dissolved carbon dioxide, in line with what may exist by the end of the century. They found that the higher carbon dioxide disrupted a key brain receptor in the fish, interfering with neurotransmitter functions. The damaged central nervous systems affected fish behavior and diminishing their sensory capacity to a point "likely to impair their chances of survival". The fishes were less able to locate reefs by smell or "detect the warning smell of a predator fish". Nor could they hear the sounds made by other reef fish, compromising their ability to locate safe reefs and avoid dangerous ones. They also lost their usual tendencies to turn to the left or right, damaging their ability to school with other fish.

Although previous experiments found several detrimental effects on coral fish behavior from projected end-of-21st-century ocean acidification, a 2020 replication study found that "end-of-century ocean acidification levels have negligible effects on [three] important behaviors of coral reef fishes" and with "data simulations, [showed] that the large effect sizes and small within-group variances that have been reported in several previous studies are highly improbable". In 2021 it emerged that allegations of some of the previous studies being fraudulent have been raised. Furthermore, effect sizes of studies assessing ocean acidification effects on fish behavior have declined dramatically over a decade of research on this topic, with effects appearing negligible since 2015.

=== Ocean deoxygenation ===
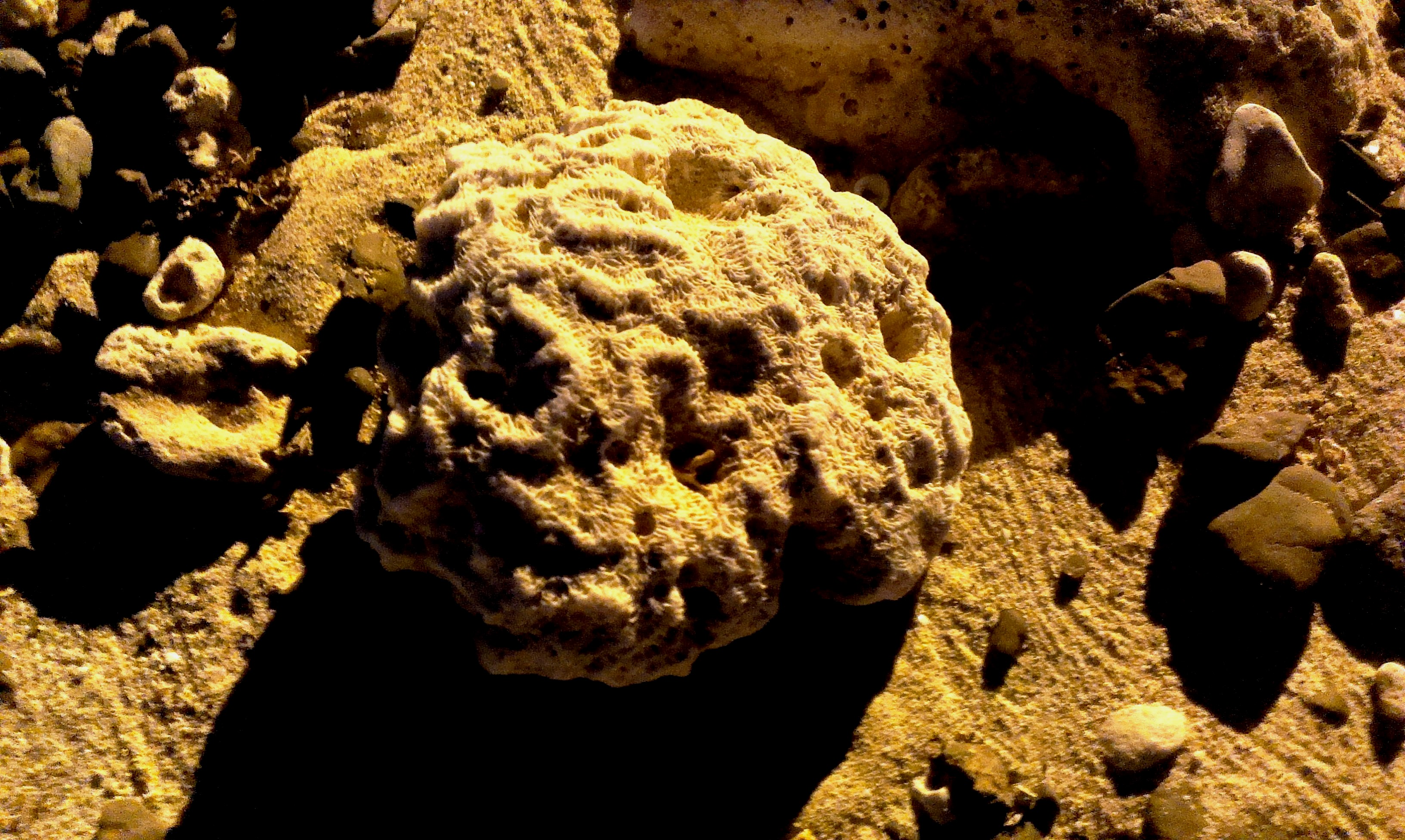
Some coral reefs are experiencing hypoxia which can lead to bleaching and mass coral die-offs

There has been a severe increase in mass mortality events associated with low oxygen causing mass hypoxia with an increase in reported events noted in the 1990s, 2000s and 2010s. The rise in water temperature leads to an increase in oxygen demand and the increase for ocean deoxygenation which causes these large coral reef dead zones. For many coral reefs, the response to this hypoxia is very dependent on the magnitude and duration of the deoxygenation. The symptoms can be anywhere from reduced photosynthesis and calcification to bleaching. Hypoxia can have indirect effects like the abundance of algae and spread of coral diseases in the ecosystems. While coral is unable to handle such low levels of oxygen, algae is quite tolerant. Because of this, in interaction zones between algae and coral, increased hypoxia will cause more coral death and higher spread of algae. The increase mass coral dead zones is reinforced by the spread of coral diseases. Coral diseases can spread easily when there are high concentrations of sulfide and hypoxic conditions. Due to the loop of hypoxia and coral reef mortality, the fish and other marine life that inhabryter, and some enter a phase of metabolic and ventilatory depression. Invertebrates migrate out of their homes to the surface of substratum or move to the tips of arborescent coral colonies.

Around 6 million people, the majority who live in developing countries, depend on coral reef fisheries. These mass die-offs due to extreme hypoxic events can have severe impacts on reef fish populations. Coral reef ecosystems offer a variety of essential ecosystem services including shoreline protection, nitrogen fixation, and waste assimilation, and tourism opportunities. The continued decline of oxygen in oceans on coral reefs is concerning because it takes many years (decades) to repair and regrow corals.

=== Disease ===
Disease is a serious threat to many coral species. The diseases of coral may consist of bacterial, viral, fungal, or parasitic infections. Due to stressors like climate change and pollution, coral can become more vulnerable to diseases. Some examples of coral disease are Vibrio, white syndrome, white band, rapid wasting disease, and many more. These diseases have different effects on the corals, ranging from damaging and killing individual corals to wiping out entire reefs.

In the Caribbean, white band disease is one of the primary causes for the death of over eighty percent of Staghorn and Elkhorn coral (Reef Resilience). It is a disease that can destroy miles of coral reef fast.

A disease such as white plague can spread over a coral colony by a half an inch a day. By the time the disease has fully taken over the colony, it leaves behind a dead skeleton. Dead standing coral structures are what most people see after disease has taken over a reef.

Recently, the Florida Reef Tract in the United States has been plagued by a stony coral tissue loss disease. The disease was first identified in 2014 and as of 2018 has been reported in every part of the reef except the lower Florida Keys and the Dry Tortugas. The cause of the disease is unknown but is thought to be caused by bacteria and be transmitted through direct contact and water circulation. This disease event is unique due to its large geographic range, extended duration, rapid progression, high rates of mortality and the number of species affected.

=== Recreational diving ===
During the 20th century recreational scuba diving was considered to have generally low environmental impact, and was consequently one of the activities permitted in most marine protected areas. Since the 1970s diving has changed from an elite activity to a more accessible recreation, marketed to a very wide demographic. To some extent better equipment has been substituted for more rigorous training, and the reduction in perceived risk has shortened minimum training requirements by several training agencies. Training has concentrated on an acceptable risk to the diver, and paid less attention to the environment. The increase in the popularity of diving and in tourist access to sensitive ecological systems has led to the recognition that the activity can have significant environmental consequences.

Scuba diving has grown in popularity during the 21st century, as is shown by the number of certifications issued worldwide, which has increased to about 23 million by 2016 at about one million per year. Scuba diving tourism is a growth industry, and it is necessary to consider environmental sustainability, as the expanding impact of divers can adversely affect the marine environment in several ways, and the impact also depends on the specific environment. Tropical coral reefs are more easily damaged by poor diving skills than some temperate reefs, where the environment is more robust due to rougher sea conditions and fewer fragile, slow-growing organisms. The same pleasant sea conditions that allow development of relatively delicate and highly diverse ecologies also attract the greatest number of tourists, including divers who dive infrequently, exclusively on vacation and never fully develop the skills to dive in an environmentally friendly way. Low impact diving training has been shown to be effective in reducing diver contact to more sustainable levels. Experience appears to be the most important factor in explaining divers' underwater behaviour, followed by their attitude towards diving and the environment, and personality type.

=== Other issues ===
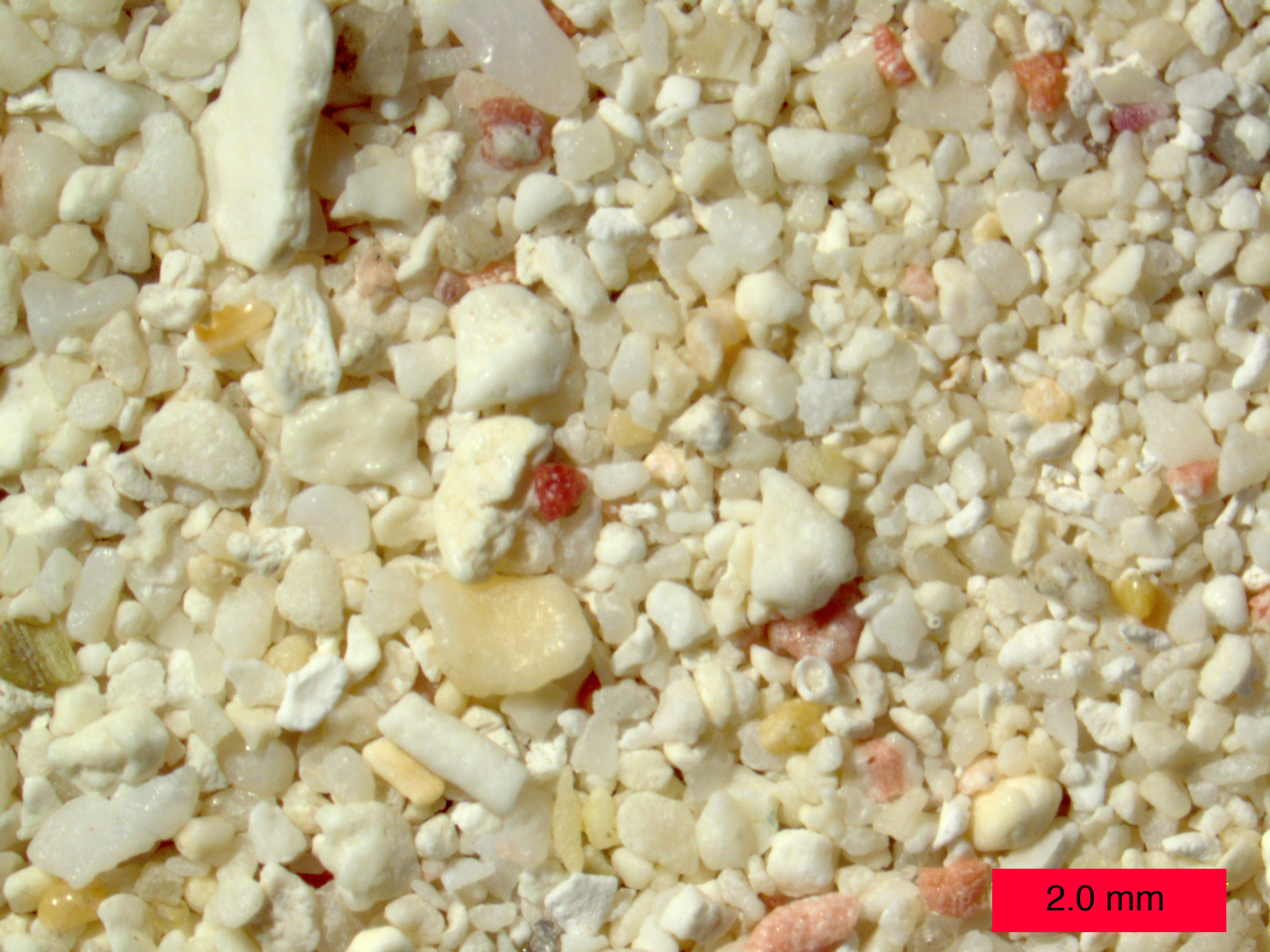
Coral sand from a beach on Aruba, Caribbean Sea.

Within the last 20 years, seagrass meadows and mangrove forests (which absorb large amounts of nutrients and sediment) have been destroyed. Both the loss of wetlands, mangrove habitats and seagrass meadows affect the water quality of inshore reefs.

Coral mining is another threat. Both small scale harvesting by villagers and industrial scale mining by companies are serious threats. Mining is usually done to produce construction material which is valued as much as 50% cheaper than other rocks, such as from quarries. The rocks are ground and mixed with other materials, like cement to make concrete. Ancient coral used for construction is known as coral rag. Building directly on the reef also takes its toll, altering water circulation and the tides which bring the nutrients to the reef. The pressing reason for building on reefs is simply lack of space, and because of this, some of the areas with heavily mined coral reefs have still not been able to recover. Another pressing issue is coral collecting. There are bountiful amounts of coral that are deemed so beautiful that they are often collected. The collected coral are used to make a handful of things, including jewelry and home decorations. The breakage of coral branches is unhealthy for the reefs; therefore, tourists and those who purchase such items contribute greatly to the already devastating coral reefs and climate change.

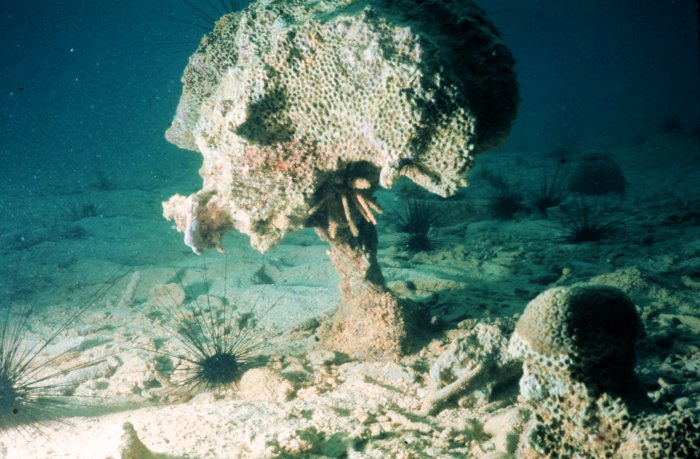
Eroded coral

Boats and ships require access points into bays and islands to load and unload cargo and people. For this, parts of reefs are often chopped away to clear a path. Negative consequences can include altered water circulation and altered tidal patterns which can disrupt the reef's nutrient supply; sometimes destroying a great part of the reef. Fishing vessels and other large boats occasionally run aground on a reef. Two types of damage can result. Collision damage occurs when a coral reef is crushed and split by a vessel's hull into multiple fragments. Scarring occurs when boat propellers tear off the live coral and expose the skeleton. The physical damage can be noticed as striations. Mooring causes damage which can be reduced by using mooring buoys. Buoys can attach to the seafloor using concrete blocks as weights or by penetrating the seafloor, which further reduces damage. Also, reef docks can be used to move over goods from large, seagoing vessels to small, flat-bottomed vessels.

Coral in Taiwan is being threatened by the influx of human population growth. Since 2007, several local environmental groups conducted research and found that much of the coral populations are being affected by untreated sewage, an influx of tourists taking corals for souvenirs, without fully understanding the destructive impact on the coral's ecological system. Researchers reported to the Taiwanese government that many coral populations have turned black in the southeast coast of Taiwan. Potentially, this could lead to loss of food supply, medicinal sources and tourism due to the breakdown of the food chain.

== Oil ==
Causes and effects of oil spills

The causes for oils spills can be separated into 2 categories: natural and anthropogenic causes.

Natural causes can be from oil that leaks out from the ocean floor into the water; erosion of the seafloor; or even climate change. The amount that naturally seeps into the ocean is 181 million gallons, which varies yearly.

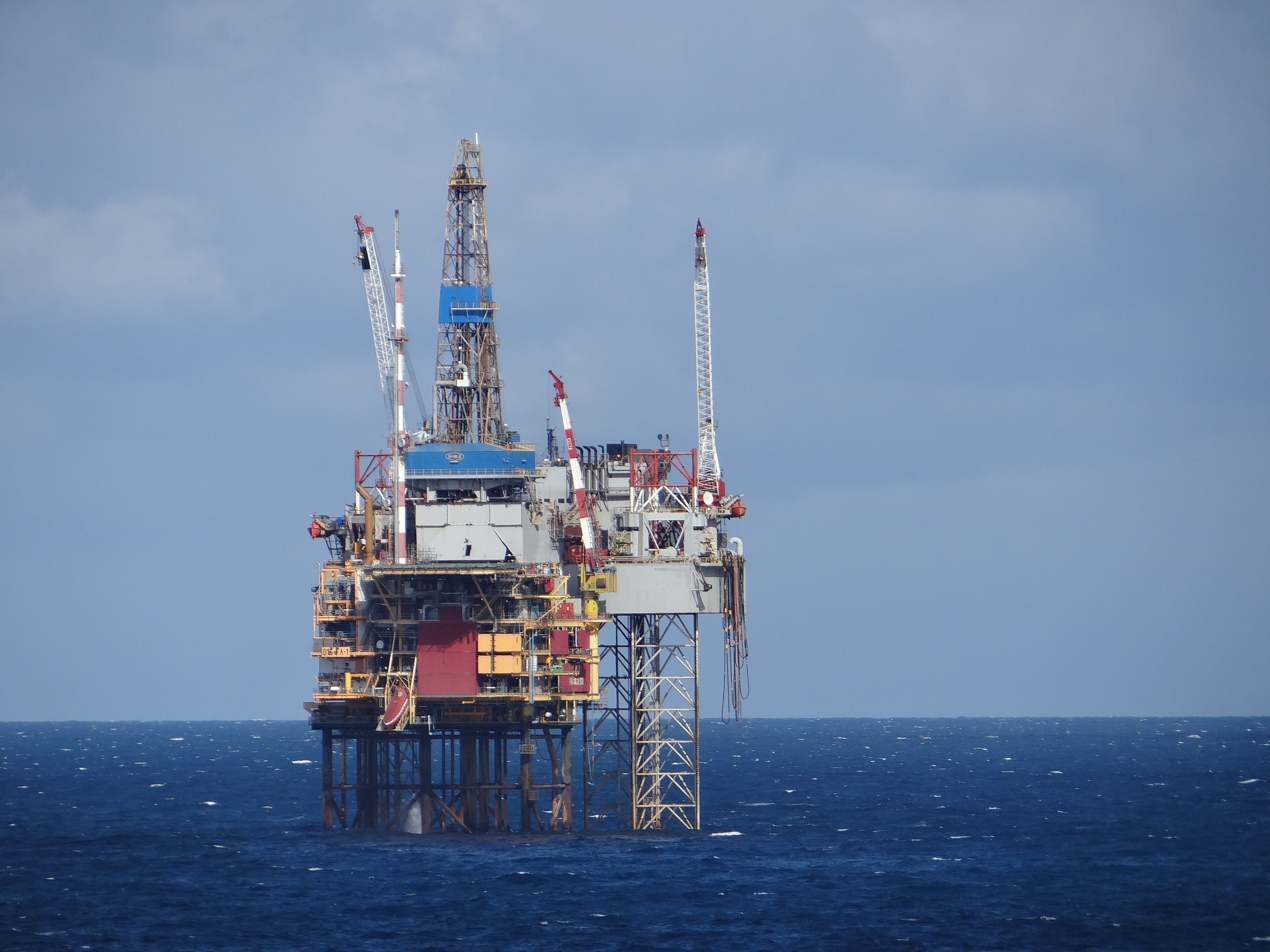
Oil Rig in the North Sea

Anthropogenic causes involve human activities and is how most oil enters the ocean. The ways oil spills anthropogenically in the ocean are because of drilling rigs, pipelines, refineries, and wars. Anthropogenic spills are more harmful than naturals spills, as unlike natural spills, they leak about 210 million gallons of petroleum each year. Also, anthropogenic spills cause abrupt changes to ecosystems with long-term effects and even longer remediations.

When oil spills occur, the affects can be felt in an area for decades and can cause massive damage to the aquatic life. For aquatic plant life an oil spill could affect how light, and oxygen is available for photosynthesis.

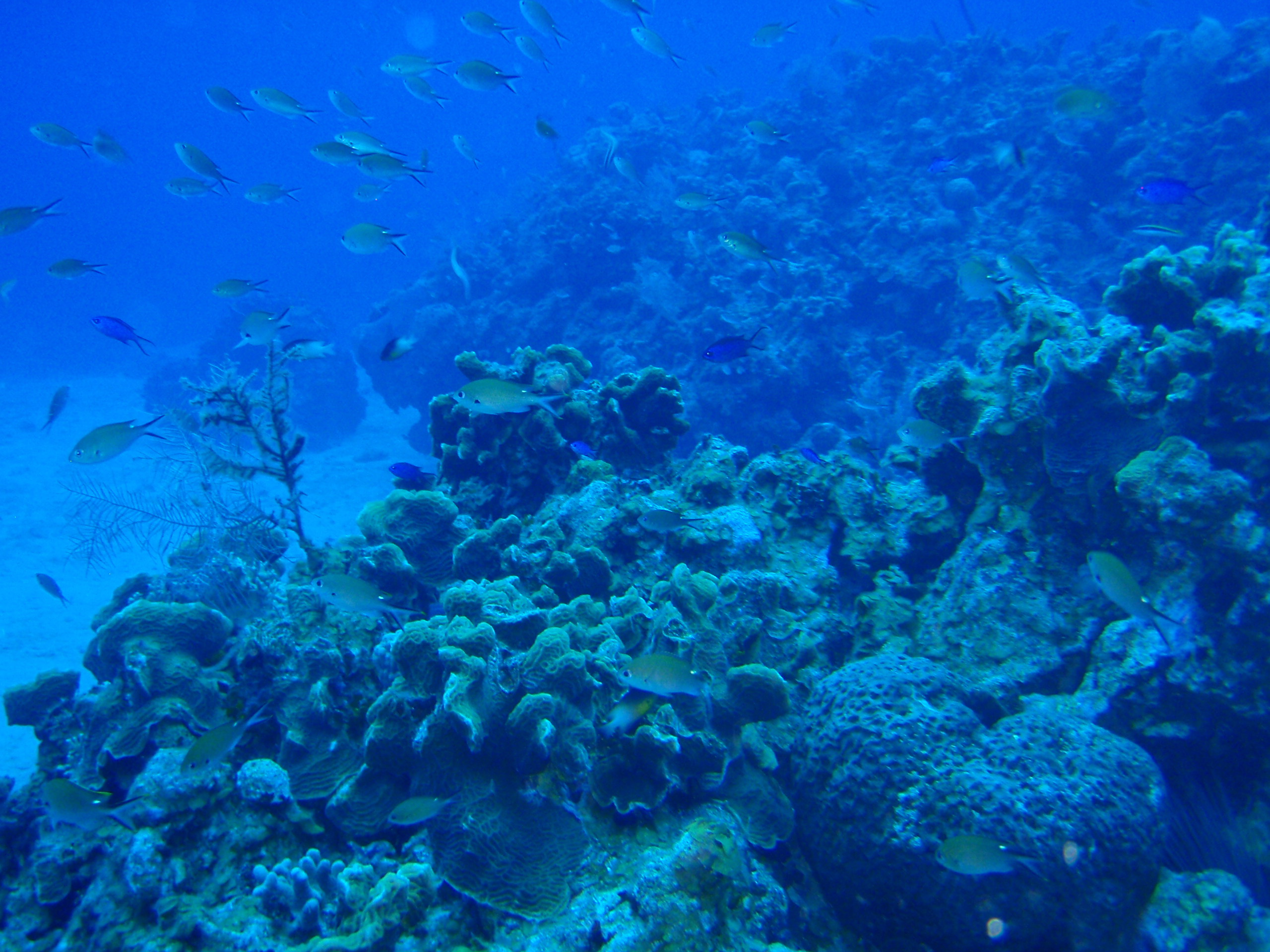
Coral Reef Community

Two other examples of the many ways oil harms wildlife are in the form of oil toxicity and fouling. Oil toxicity affects the wildlife when the toxic compounds oil is made up of enters the body doing damage to the internal organs, and eventually causes death. Fouling is when oil harms wildlife via coating itself on an animal or plant physically.

Oil impacts on coral reef communities

Oil pollution is hazardous to living marine habitats due to its toxic constituents. Oil spills occur due to natural seepage and during activities such as transportation and handling. These spills harm the marine and coastal wildlife. When the organisms have become exposed to these oil spills, it can lead them to suffer from skin irritation, decreased immunity and gastrointestinal damage.

When oil floats above the coral reef, it will have no effect on the coral below, it is when the oil starts to sink to the ocean floor when it becomes a problem. The problem is the physical effect from the oil-sediment particle which has been found to be less harmful than if the coral came in contact with the toxic oil.

When the oil comes into contact with corals, not only the reef system will be affected but fish, crabs and many more marine invertebrates. Just a few drops of oil can cause coral reef fish to make poor decisions. Oil will impact the thinking of the coral reef fish in a way that could be dangerous to the fish and the coral reef where they choose their home.

It can negatively affect their growth, survival, settlement behaviors, and increases predation. It has been found that larval fish who have been exposed to oil will eventually have heart issues and physical irregularities later in life.

=== Oil impacts on coral life and symbiotic relationships ===
Evidence for the damaging effects of oil spills on coral reef structures can be seen at a reef site a few kilometers southwest of the Macondo well. Coral at this site, which has been covered in crude oil chemicals and brown flocculent particles, were found dying just seven months after the Deepwater Horizon eruption.

Gorgonian Coral

Gorgonian octocorals (soft coral communities) are highly susceptible to damage from oil spills. This is due to the structure and function of their polyps, which are specialized in filtering tiny particles from the water.

Corals have a complex relationship with many different prokaryotic organisms, including probiotic microorganisms that protect the corals from harmful environmental pollutants. However, research has shown that oil spills damage these organisms, and weaken their ability to protect reef structures in the presence of oil pollution.

=== Oil clean up methods ===
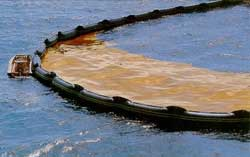
Oil Spill Containment Boom

Booms are floating barricades that are placed in an oil spreading area that restrict the movement of floating oil. Booms are often utilized alongside skimmers, which are sponges and oil absorbent ropes that collect oil from the water. Moreover, in situ-burning and chemical dispersion can be utilized during an oil spillage. In situ-burning refers to burning oil that has been collected to one location with a fire-resistant containment boom, however, the combustion from in situ-burning does not fully remove the oil but instead breaks it down into different chemicals which can negatively affect marine reefs.

Chemical dispersants consist of emulsifiers and solvents that break oil into small droplets and are the most common form of oil removal, however, these can reduce corals resilience to environmental stressors. Moreover, chemical dispersants can physically harm coral species when exposed. Dispersants have been also utilized to clean oil spills, however, they harm early stages of coral and reduces the settlement on reef systems and have since been banned. However, there is still one formulation of dispersants used, the Corexit 9427.

Microbial biosurfactants can be utilized to reduce the damage to reef ecosystems as an eco-friendly method, however, there are limitations to their effect. This method is still being studied and is not a certain method of oil clean up.

== Threatened species ==
The global standard for recording threatened marine species is the IUCN Red List of Threatened Species. This list is the foundation for marine conservation priorities worldwide. A species is listed in the threatened category if it is considered to be critically endangered, endangered, or vulnerable. Other categories are near threatened and data deficient. By 2008, the IUCN had assessed all 845 known reef-building corals species, marking 27% as Threatened, 20% as near threatened, and 17% as data deficient.

The coral triangle (Indo-Malay-Philippine archipelago) region has the highest number of reef-building coral species in threatened category as well as the highest coral species diversity. The loss of coral reef ecosystems will have devastating effects on many marine species, as well as on people that depend on reef resources for their livelihoods.

== Issues by region ==
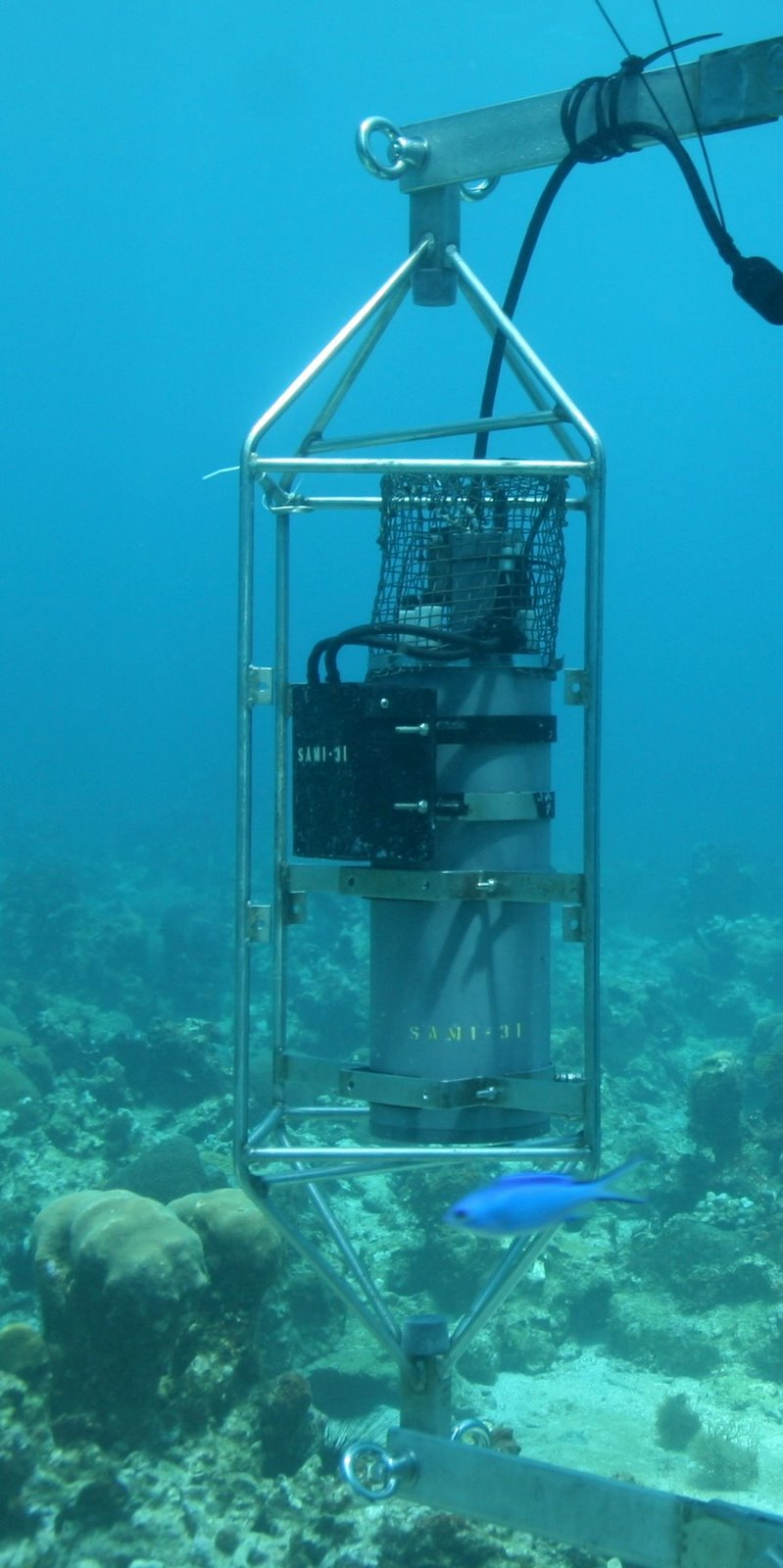
A NOAA (AOML) in situ pCO_{2} sensor (SAMI-CO2), attached to a Coral Reef Early Warning System station in Discovery Bay, Jamaica, utilized in conducting ocean acidification studies near coral reef areas

=== Australia ===
The Great Barrier Reef is the world's largest coral reef system. The reef is located in the Coral Sea and a large part of the reef is protected by the Great Barrier Reef Marine Park. Particular environmental pressures include surface runoff, salinity fluctuations, climate change, cyclic crown-of-thorns outbreaks, overfishing, and spills or improper ballast discharge. According to the 2014 report of the Government of Australia's Great Barrier Reef Marine Park Authority (GBRMPA), climate change is the most significant environmental threat to the Great Barrier Reef. As of 2018, 50% of the coral on the Great Barrier Reef has been lost.

=== Southeast Asia ===
Southeast Asian coral reefs are at risk from damaging fishing practices (such as cyanide and blast fishing), overfishing, sedimentation, pollution and bleaching. Activities including education, regulation and the establishment of marine protected areas help protect these reefs.

==== Indonesia ====
Indonesia is home to one-third of the world's coral reefs, with coral that covers nearly 85,000 square kilometres (33,000 sq mi) and is home to one-quarter of its fish species. Indonesia's coral reefs are located in the heart of the Coral Triangle and have fallen victim to destructive fishing, tourism and bleaching. Data from LIPI in 1998 found that only 7 percent is in excellent condition, 24 percent is in good condition and approximately 69 percent is in poor-to-fair condition. According to one source, Indonesia will lose 70 percent of its coral reef by 2050 if restoration action does not occur.

==== Philippines ====
In 2007, Reef Check, the world's largest reef conservation organization, stated that only 5% of Philippines 27,000 square kilometres (10,000 sq mi) of coral reef are in "excellent condition": Tubbataha Reef, Marine Park in Palawan, Apo Island in Negros Oriental, Apo Reef in Puerto Galera, Mindoro, and Verde Island Passage off Batangas. Philippine coral reefs is Asia's second largest.

==== Taiwan ====
Coral reefs in Taiwan are being threatened by human population growth. Many corals are affected by untreated sewage and souvenir-hunting tourists, not knowing that this practice destroys habitat and causes disease. Many corals have turned black from disease off Taiwan's southeast coast.

=== Caribbean ===
Coral disease was first recognized as a threat to Caribbean reefs in 1972 when black band disease was discovered. Since then diseases have been occurring with higher frequency.

It has been estimated that 50% of the Caribbean Sea coral cover has disappeared since the 1960s. According to a United Nations Environment Program report, the Caribbean coral reefs might face extirpation in next 20 years due to population expansion along the coast lines, overfishing, the pollution of coastal areas, global warming, and invasive species.

In 2005, the Caribbean lost about 50% of its reef in one year due to coral bleaching. The warm water from Puerto Rico and the Virgin Islands travelled south to cause this coral bleaching.

==== Mesoamerican Barrier Reef System ====
Located in the Caribbean Sea, the Mesoamerican Barrier Reef System is the second-largest coral reef system in the world. The reef faces an increasing number of threats from climate change. Coral bleaching is emerging as a significant driver of reef degradation. Recent research highlights the environmental stressors that contribute to coral bleaching in this region. The study, which analyzed data from 2015 to 2017, found that intermediate bleaching events were most prevalent in 2017. By examining 23 stress exposure and sensitivity metrics, the researchers identified key factors influencing bleaching severity, including thermal patterns such as seasonal warming rates and heat stress events. Their findings suggest that commonly used indices like Degree Heating Weeks may not fully capture the nuances of bleaching risk. Alternative metrics could help improve predictive models. In addition to thermal stress, the study revealed that deeper reefs with diverse coral species were more susceptible to bleaching than previously assumed. This challenges understanding that deeper reef areas serve as refuges from climate-related stress. The authors propose a new framework for assessing coral reef bleaching vulnerability using publicly accessible data, which could enhance existing monitoring systems and inform conservation strategies.

==== Jamaica ====
Jamaica is the third largest Caribbean island. The Caribbean's coral reefs will cease to exist in 20 years if a conservation effort is not made. In 2005, 34 percent of Jamaica's coral reefs were bleached due to rising sea temperatures. Jamaica's coral reefs are also threatened by overfishing, pollution, natural disasters, and reef mining. In 2009, researchers concluded that many of the corals are recovering very slowly.

==== United States ====
Southeastern Florida's reef track is 300 miles long. Florida's coral reefs are currently undergoing an unprecedented stony coral tissue loss disease. The disease covers a large geographic range and affects many species of coral.

In January 2019, science divers confirmed that the outbreak of stony coral tissue that extends south and west of Key West. In December 2018, Disease was spotted at Maryland Shoals, near the Saddlebunch Keys. By mid January 5 more sites between American Shoal and Eastern Dry Rocks were confirmed diseased.

Puerto Rico is home to over 5,000 square kilometers of shallow coral reef ecosystems. Puerto Rico's coral reefs and associated ecosystems have an average economic value of nearly $1.1 billion per year.

The U.S. Virgin Islands' coral reefs and associated ecosystems have an average economic value of $187 million per year.

=== Pacific ===
==== United States ====
Hawaii's coral reefs (e.g. French Frigate Shoals) are a major factor in Hawaii's $800 million a year marine tourism and are being affected negatively by coral bleaching and increased sea surface temperatures, which in turn leads to coral reef diseases. The first large-scale coral bleaching occurred in 1996 and in 2004 it was found that the sea surface temperatures had been steadily increasing and if this pattern continues, bleaching events will occur more frequently and severely.

== See also ==
- Marine cloud brightening
