= Bay du Nord =

Bay du Nord may refer to:

- Bay du Nord, Hermitage Bay, Newfoundland and Labrador, an abandoned community
- Bay du Nord series, a geologic formation in Newfoundland
- Bay du Nord River, in Newfoundland
- Bay du Nord property, 500km northeast offshore St. John's NL
- Bay du Nord Wilderness Reserve, in central Newfoundland
