= Joes =

Joes may refer to:

- Joes, Colorado, a settlement in the United States
- Joes Mountain, several mountains
- Jef Joes, or just Joes, an island in West Papua, Indonesia
- Joes, a term used for the banknotes of Demerary and Essequibo

== See also ==
- Joe (disambiguation)
