= YUS =

Yus refers to a group of archaic letters of the Cyrillic script.

Yus or YUS may also refer to:

- Pulau Yus (Yus Island), an island in West Papua
- Yus Rural LLG in Morobe Province, Papua New Guinea
- YUS Conservation Area, Papua New Guinea
- Yonge–University–Spadina line, a subway line in Toronto
- IATA code for Yushu Batang Airport, China

== See also ==
- Jus (disambiguation)
