= Sakam =

Sakam may be:

- Sakam language or Kutong, a Finisterre (Papuan) language of Papua New Guinea
- Sakam Tower or Fort Provintia, a Dutch fort in Tainan, Taiwan
