= Džo =

Džo is the cognate of Joe, and may refer to:

- Ljubisav Đokić
- Josip Šimunić
