= Joe =

Joe or JOE may refer to:

== Arts ==
=== Film and television ===
- Joe (1970 film), starring Peter Boyle
- Joe (2013 film), starring Nicolas Cage, based on the novel Joe (1991) by Larry Brown
- Joe (2023 film), an Indian film
- Joe (TV series), a British TV series airing from 1966 to 1971
- Joe, a 2002 Canadian animated short about Joe Fortes

=== Music and radio ===
- "Joe" (Inspiral Carpets song)
- "Joe" (Red Hot Chili Peppers song)
- "Joe", a song by The Cranberries on their album To the Faithful Departed
- "Joe", a song by PJ Harvey on her album Dry
- "Joe", a song by AJR on their album OK Orchestra
- Joe FM (disambiguation), any of several radio stations

== Computing ==
- Joe's Own Editor, a text editor for Unix systems
- Joe, an object-oriented Java computing framework based on Sun's Distributed Objects Everywhere project

== Media ==
- Joe (website), a news website for the UK and Ireland
- Joe (magazine), a defunct periodical developed originally for Kenyan youth

== Places ==
- Joe, North Carolina, United States, an unincorporated community
- Jõe, Saaremaa Parish, Estonia, a village
- Kaarma-Jõe, Estonia, a village
- Joe Island (Victoria), Australia
- Joe Island (Greenland)

== People ==
- Joe (given name), a given name (including a list of people and fictional characters with the name)
- Joe (surname)
- Joe (singer) (born 1973 as Joe Lewis Thomas), American singer, songwriter and record producer
- J.O.E., stage name of Alty George Nunes III (1986–2011), Jamaican reggae singer

== Other uses ==
- Jōe, a garment worn in Japanese religious ceremonies
- Joe (drink), slang for coffee
- Joe, a currency, see banknotes of Demerary and Essequibo
- Joensuu Airport, Liperi, Finland, by IATA airport code

== See also ==
- Joe 1, American codename for the first Soviet nuclear weapon test
- Joe 4, American codename for the first Soviet test of a thermonuclear weapon
- Joes (disambiguation)
- Joey (disambiguation)
- Jo (disambiguation)
