= Jo =

Jo, jo, JO, or J.O. may refer to:

== Arts and entertainment ==
- Jo (film), a 1972 French comedy
- Jo (TV series), a French TV series
- "Jo", a song by Goldfrapp from Tales of Us
- "Jo", a song by Mr. Oizo from Lambs Anger
- Jo a fictional character in the Star Wars franchise

== People ==
- Jo (given name)
- Jô, Brazilian footballer João Alves de Assis Silva (born 1987)
- Josiel Alves de Oliveira (born 1988), Brazilian footballer also known as Jô
- Jō (surname), a Japanese surname
- Cho (Korean name), a common Korean surname which can be romanized as Jo

== Codes ==
- JO, ISO 3166 country code for Jordan
- .jo, the Internet country code top-level domain for Jordan
- JO, IATA code for JALways, a subsidiary of Japan Airlines

== Other uses ==
- jō (杖), a wooden staff used in some Japanese martial arts
- jō (丈), a Japanese unit of length equivalent to the Chinese zhang
- jō (畳), a Japanese unit of area corresponding to the area of a standard tatami mat (1×½ ken or 18 square Japanese feet)
- JO, U.S. Navy rating-abbreviation for "journalist"
- Journal Officiel de la République Française, the official gazette of the Government of France
- Jo, a Vodun (deity) in the Fon pantheon.
- Jo people, ethnic group in India and Myanmar
- Jo language, a Duala language
- Ё, a letter of the Cyrillic alphabet
- , symbol for rapid services on the Sōbu Line and Yokosuka Line.

== See also ==
- Joe (disambiguation)
- Jojo (disambiguation)
