= Mount Sylvester =

Mountain in Newfoundland and Labrador, Canada

Coordinates: 48°10′37.62″N 55°04′39.66″W

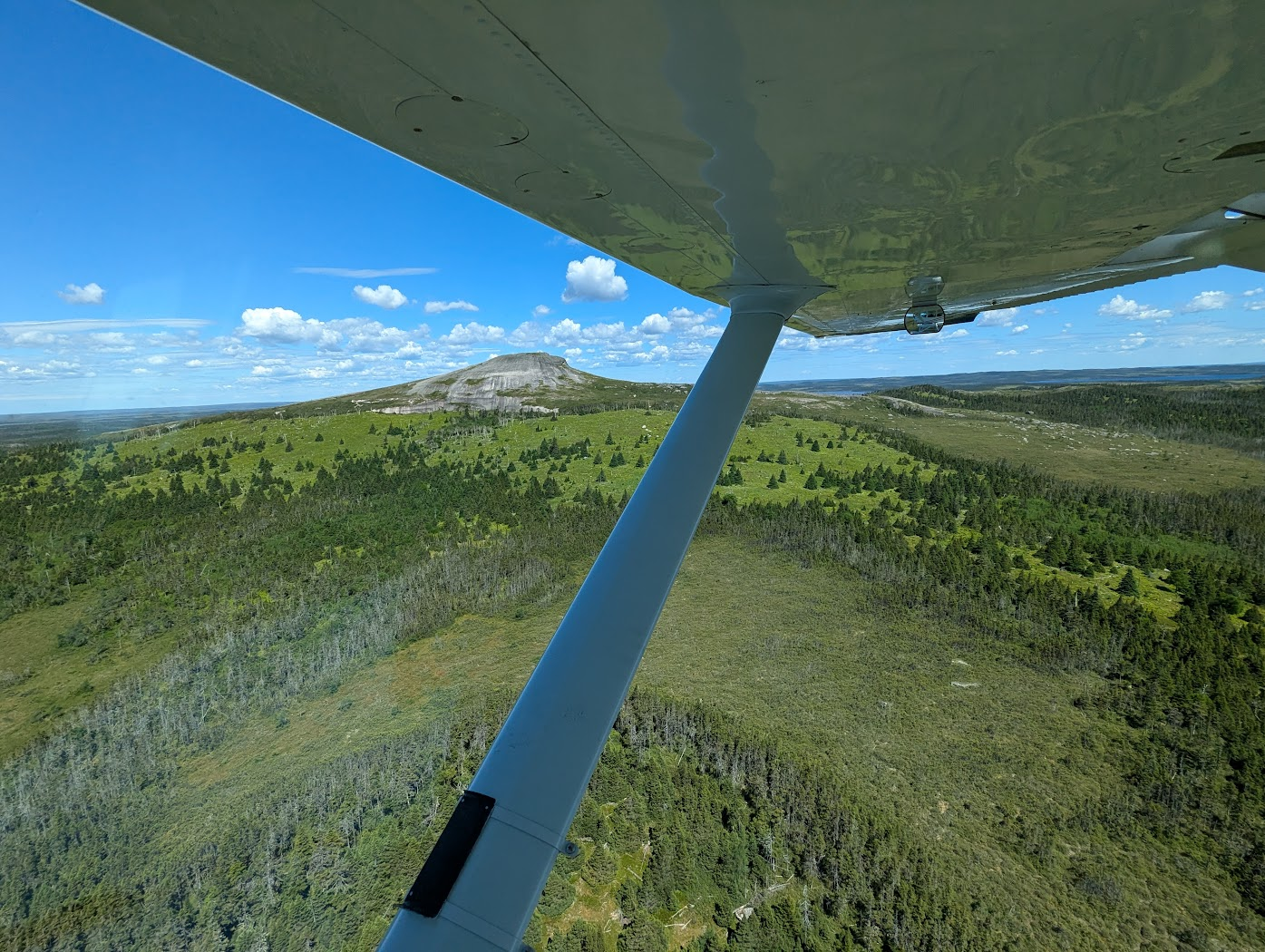
Aerial photo of Mount Sylvester

Mount Sylvester is a large formation of rock of the glacier period found in central portion of the Island of Newfoundland. The mountain lies within the boundary of the Bay du Nord Wilderness Reserve in the province of Newfoundland and Labrador, Canada.

== History ==
Sylvester Joe (unknown – 1839), hunter and explorer, born Bay d'Espoir, Newfoundland. Joe, a native Mi'kmaq of Newfoundland, was the noted hunter from the south-west coast of the island of Newfoundland who was engaged by William Cormack to guide him on his trek across Newfoundland, the first European Canadian to do so.

== Geography ==
The area which makes up Mount Sylvester is known as an Inselberg, a rock tower produced by chemical weathering and further modified by glaciation.
