= Sylvester Joe =

Newfoundland hunter and explorer (fl. 1822–1839)

- Born: Bay d'Espoir, Newfoundland Colony
- Occupations: Hunter, explorer
- Years active: 1822–1839
- Known for: Guide for William Cormack

Sylvester Joe (fl. 1822–1839), also erreonously called Joseph Sylvester, was a Mi'kmaq hunter and explorer from Newfoundland. Best known as the guide for Scottish explorer and author William Cormack, he led Cormack's team across the interior of the island of Newfoundland. Joe is the namesake of Mount Sylvester.

== Biography ==
Outside of his voyage into Newfoundland's interior, very little is known about Joe's life. He was from Bay d'Espoir in the south coast of Newfoundland. In 1822, he was engaged by William Cormack to explore the interior of the island of Newfoundland, the first European colonizer to do so. In his writings, William Cormack refers to Joe as Joseph Sylvester, it would appear that he had reversed the name inadvertently, as Joe is a common surname among among Newfoundland Mi'kmaq while Sylvester is virtually unknown by comparison.

Joe can be credited for much of the success of Cormack's venture which began at Smith Sound, Trinity Bay and ended at St. George's Bay on the west coast of the Island. This cross island expedition was undertaken by just Joe and Cormack in search of the declining population of the native Beothuk and to also explore the interior of the Island.

On September 10, 1822, five days into their journey, Cormack immortalized Joe by naming Mount Sylvester in his honour. When Joe realized the immensity of the task at hand, he suggested to Cormack that they abandon their expedition and head south to his home town of Bay d'Espoir. Cormack convinced him to continue by drawing up a new contract on September 14. The contract reads as follows:

I promise and agree with Joseph Silvester that if he accompanies me from St. John's to St. George's Bay by land ... besides what I may have already done for him, that after he takes me safe there, that I will on our return, give his mother one barrel of flour, one barrel of pork and anything else that may be found suitable, and further, that he is to go along with me to England or Scotland and stay there as long as I do, or if he likes he may return to St. John's with me next year, or if he likes I will give him passage ... to Portugal or Spain in order that it might do his health good. If Joe should ever go to Prince Edward Island I will give him a letter to my friends there to do what they can for him...

Despite the many hardships and their personal conflicts, the pair continued the cross-island journey and reached their destination on November 4, 1829. Joe spent the winter in St. George's. From then on, little is known of Sylvester Joe. In 1839, Geologist Joseph Jukes attempted to contact "Cormack's Indian" while travelling in the west coast of Newfoundland, but he was unsuccessful.
