= Canadian Heritage Rivers System =

The Canadian Heritage Rivers System (CHRS; French: Le réseau de rivières du patrimoine canadien) is a joint program administered by the federal, provincial, and territorial governments to conserve and protect the best examples of Canada's river heritage, to give them national recognition, and to encourage the public to enjoy and appreciate them. It is a cooperative program of the governments of Canada, nine provinces, and the three territories. A 14-member national board, created under the Parks Canada Agency Act, administers the program and approves the designation of specific rivers.

Individual jurisdictions can co-nominate and co-designate their respective rivers or river segments in accordance with guidance from the program Charter, and Strategic Plan, and the Principles, Procedures and Operational Guidelines (PPOG).

== History ==
The Canadian Heritage Rivers System was established in 1984. The first Canadian Heritage River was the French River in Ontario, designated in 1986.

By 1996 there were 29 designated rivers.

Quebec withdrew its participation in 2006. There are currently 42 designated, and one nominated river or river segments; with rivers designated in every province and territory except for Quebec.

The most recent designation under the Canadian Heritage Rivers System has been a 718-kilometre segment of the North Saskatchewan River in Alberta, which was originally nominated by Smoky Lake County in 2021, and finally designated in 2024 and extends the 49-kilometre portion within Banff National Park which was originally recognized in 1989.

== Designated rivers ==
The rivers currently designated as a Canadian Heritage River are:

River	Province/Territory	Year
Alsek River	Yukon	1986
Arctic Red River	Northwest Territories	1993
Athabasca River (Jasper National Park)	Alberta	1989
Bay du Nord River	Newfoundland	2006
Bloodvein River	Manitoba/Ontario	1987/1998
Bonnet Plume River	Yukon	1998
Boundary Waters	Ontario	1996
Clearwater River	Saskatchewan/Alberta	1987/2004
Cowichan River	British Columbia	2003
Detroit River	Ontario/Michigan	2001
Fraser River	British Columbia	1998
French River	Ontario	1986
Grand River	Ontario	1994
Hayes River	Manitoba	2006
Hillsborough River	Prince Edward Island	1997
Humber River	Ontario	1999
Kazan River	Nunavut	1990
Kicking Horse River (Yoho National Park)	British Columbia	1989
Main River	Newfoundland	2001
Margaree River	Nova Scotia	1998
Mattawa River	Ontario	1988
Missinaibi River	Ontario	2004
North Saskatchewan River (Banff National Park)	Alberta	1989
North Saskatchewan River (in Alberta, below Banff National Park)	Alberta	2024
Ottawa River	Ontario	2016
Red River	Manitoba	2007
Rideau Waterway	Ontario	2000
Saint John River	New Brunswick	2013
Seal River	Manitoba	1992
Shelburne River	Nova Scotia	1997
Soper River	Nunavut	1992
South Nahanni River	Northwest Territories	1987
St. Croix River	New Brunswick	1991
St. Marys River	Ontario	2000
Tatshenshini River	Yukon	2004
Thames River	Ontario	2000
Thelon River	Nunavut	1990
The Three Rivers	Prince Edward Island	2004
Upper Restigouche River	New Brunswick	1998
Yukon River (The Thirty Mile Section)	Yukon	1991

== Nominated rivers ==
River	Province/Territory	Year
Coppermine River	Nunavut	2002

== Quebec participation ==
Quebec is the only province or territory to not have a designated or nominated river. The province withdrew its participation in the Canadian Heritage Rivers System in 2006.

Quebec's lack of participation affects nominations and designations for rivers shared with other provinces. In 1998, the New Brunswick portion of the Restigouche River was designated (as "Upper Restigouche"), while the Quebec portion was not. The Ottawa River was nominated in 2007 and designated in 2016, but only the Ontario portion of the river was included. The federal government says it's working with Quebec "to establish recognition of the heritage value of Quebec's stretch of the Outaouais River".

== Recent program updates ==
Changes to the program's Principles, Procedures and Operational Guidelines, and the latest Strategic Plan have aimed to modernize the system.

Specifically, the 2020-2030 Strategic Plan identifies four priorities:

- Advancing Reconciliation on Canadian Heritage Rivers
- Strengthening the Canadian Heritage Rivers Network
- Excellence in River Management and Conservation
- Engaging Canadians in Celebrating and Stewarding Heritage Rivers

== Awards ==
The organization has two awards, the Heritage River Award and the Canadian River Stewardship Award. Previous recipients of the Heritage River Award include:

Heritage River Award
1994	Mr. Kirk Wipper, Founder of the Canadian Recreational Canoeing Association, Toronto
1998	Mr. Bill Reid, Haida Artist and Sculptor, Vancouver
2001	Mr. Pierre Elliot Trudeau, former Prime Minister of Canada, Montreal
2004	Elder William Commanda, Algonquin Nation of the Kitigan Zibi Anishinabeg, Maniwaki, Quebec
2007	Mr. Hap Wilson, author, wilderness adventurer and artist, Temagami, Ontario
2009	Mr. Max Finkelstein, paddler, author and river advocate, Ottawa
2013	Mr. Don Gibson, river conservation advocate and long-time National Manager of the CHRS program, Ottawa
2016	Professor Bruce and Carol Hodgins, wilderness canoe leaders, educators and operators of Camp Wahnapitae, Peterborough
2021	Bobbi Rose Koe, advocate for youth, river conservationist, watershed protector, Yukon

== See also ==
- American Heritage Rivers, America's counterpart to the Canadian Heritage Rivers System
