= Bay du Nord Wilderness Reserve =

Wilderness Reserve in Canada

- IUCN category Ib (wilderness area)
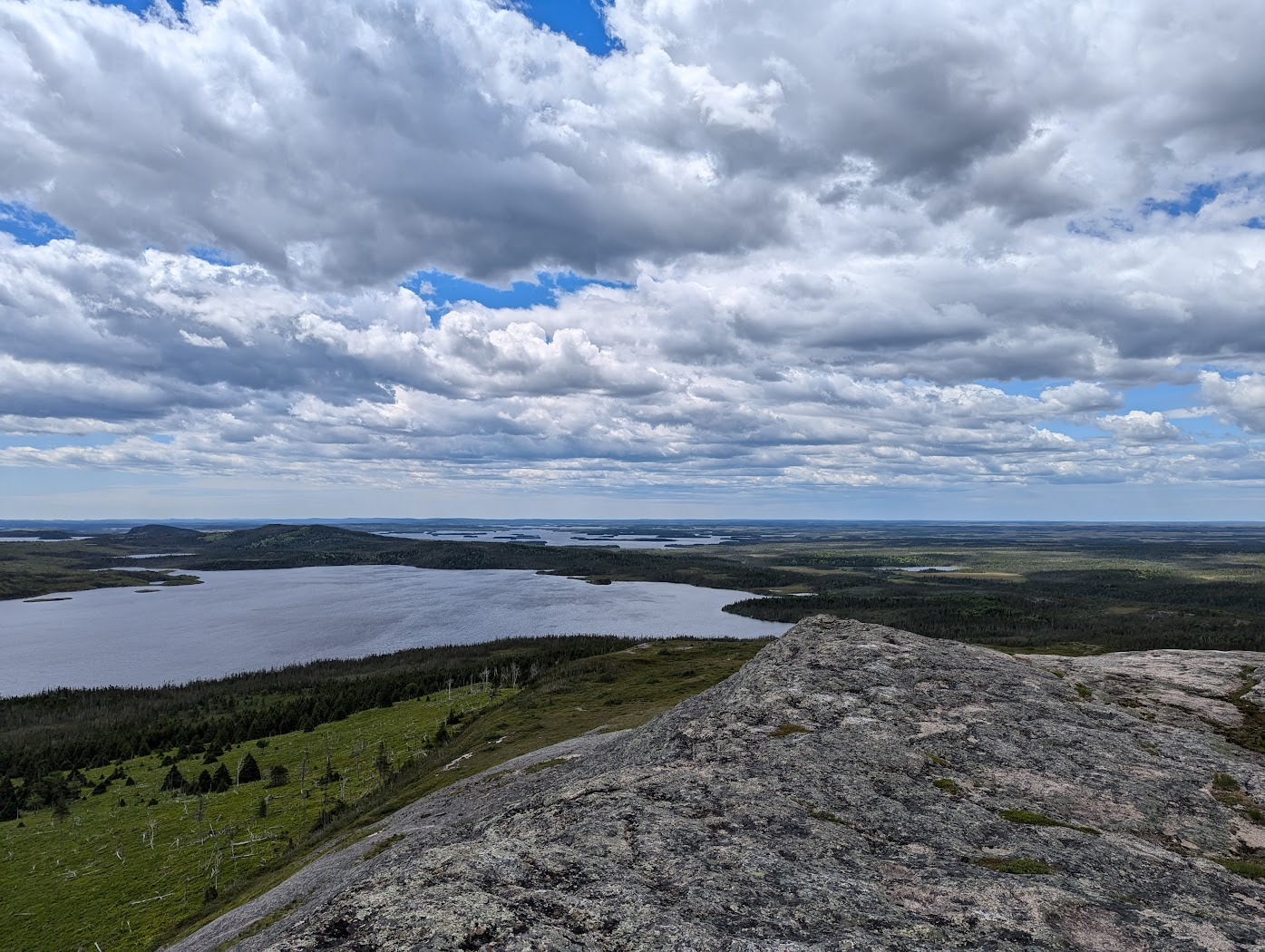
- Bay du Nord Wilderness Reserve from Mount Sylvester.
- Interactive map of Bay du Nord Wilderness Reserve
- Location: Island of Newfoundland in Newfoundland and Labrador, Canada
- Coordinates: 48.120°N 54.972°W
- Area: 2,895 km^{2} (1,118 sq mi)
- Max. elevation: 378 meters
- Min. elevation: 30 meters
- Established: 1990

Bay du Nord Wilderness Reserve is located in the central part of the island of Newfoundland in the province of Newfoundland and Labrador, Canada. It is the largest protected river system in the province, along with the largest goose habitat in Newfoundland.

== Geography ==
The reserve encompasses an area of 2,895 km^{2} (1,118 sq mi) and is considered one of the last remaining unspoiled areas of the province devoid of human habitat. It was officially created as a wilderness reserve in 1990. The reserve has no entrance roads, and is best accessed via air.

== Geology ==
The reserve contains the largest protected river system in the province. Bay du Nord River, from which the reserve takes its name, was nominated as a Canadian Heritage River in 1992. The reserve also includes Mount Sylvester, a monadnock formed during the last glacial period, as well as the Tolt. The area is also the winter calving ground for the province's largest caribou herd, and contains the largest Canada goose habitat on the island.

== History ==
Early visitors to the area included the Mi'kmaq and geologist James Patrick Howley, who was the first European to travel the entire river system. Howley had erected a cairn as a surveying aid in triangulation on the summit of Mount Sylvester. This cairn still stands.

== See also ==
- Avalon Wilderness Reserve, also on the Island of Newfoundland
