= Joe (surname) =

Joe is a surname. Notable people with the name include:

- Anthony Joe (born 1996), Australian badminton player
- Billy Joe (American football) (born 1940), American football player and coach
- Connor Joe (born 1992), American baseball player
- Isaiah Joe (born 1999), American basketball player
- Leon Joe (born 1981), American football player
- Rita Joe (1932–2007), Mi'kmaq poet and songwriter from Nova Scotia
- Sam Joe (born 1989), Australian rugby league footballer
- Sylvester Joe, 19th-century Mi'kmaq hunter and explorer in Newfoundland

== Fictional characters ==
- B.D Joe, a Crazy Taxi character
- Ellen Joe, a Zenless Zone Zero character

== See also ==
- Jō (surname)
- Joe (disambiguation)
