= Avalon Wilderness Reserve =

Canada Wilderness Reserve

Coordinates: 47°04′N 53°14′W

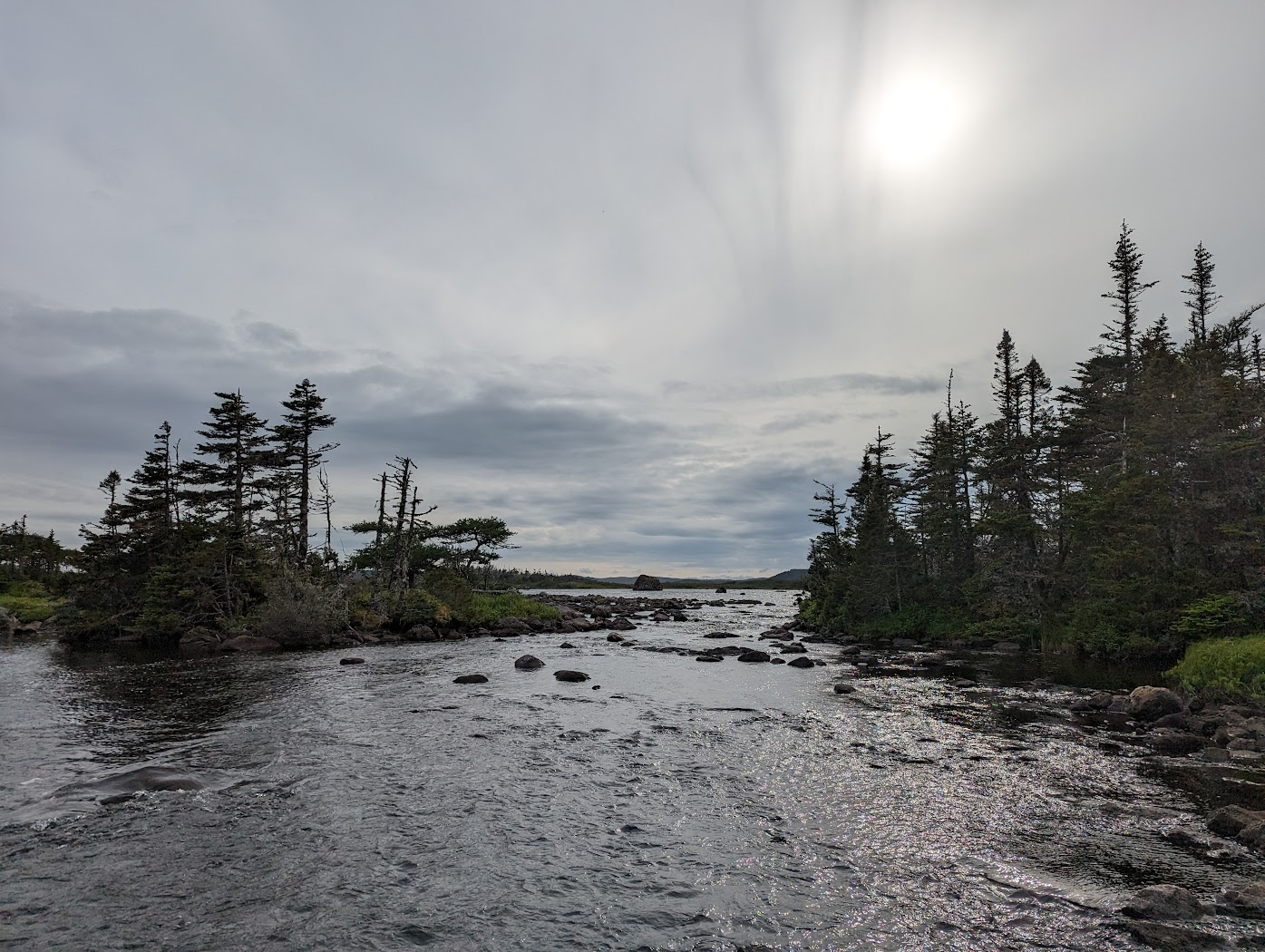
Middle Pond, Avalon Wilderness Reserve

The Avalon Wilderness Reserve is located in the center of the eastern half of the Avalon Peninsula on the Island of Newfoundland in the province of Newfoundland and Labrador, Canada.

Covering 1070 square kilometers, it is the second largest reserve on the island, following the Bay du Nord Wilderness Reserve. The Avalon Wilderness Reserve is one of the oldest protected areas in the province having been established by the Avalon Wilderness Act in 1964. The reserve protects the Avalon Migratory woodland caribou herd, the most southerly caribou herd in Canada.
