= Kutong language =

Finisterre language spoken in Papua New Guinea

Sakam
- Kutong
- Native to: Papua New Guinea
- Region: Morobe Province
- Native speakers: 1,000 (2011)
- Language family: Trans–New Guinea: Finisterre–Huon; Finisterre; Uruwa; Sakam

Language codes
- ISO 639-3: skm
- Glottolog: saka1292

Sakam, or Kutong, is one of the Finisterre languages of Papua New Guinea. It is the most divergent of its cluster, the Uruwa languages. It is spoken in Kamdaran, Makwa (6.180159°S 146.656241°E), Sakam (6.152909°S 146.677453°E), and Tamunat villages of Dinangat ward, Yus Rural LLG, Morobe Province.
