= Effects of oil exposure on wildlife =

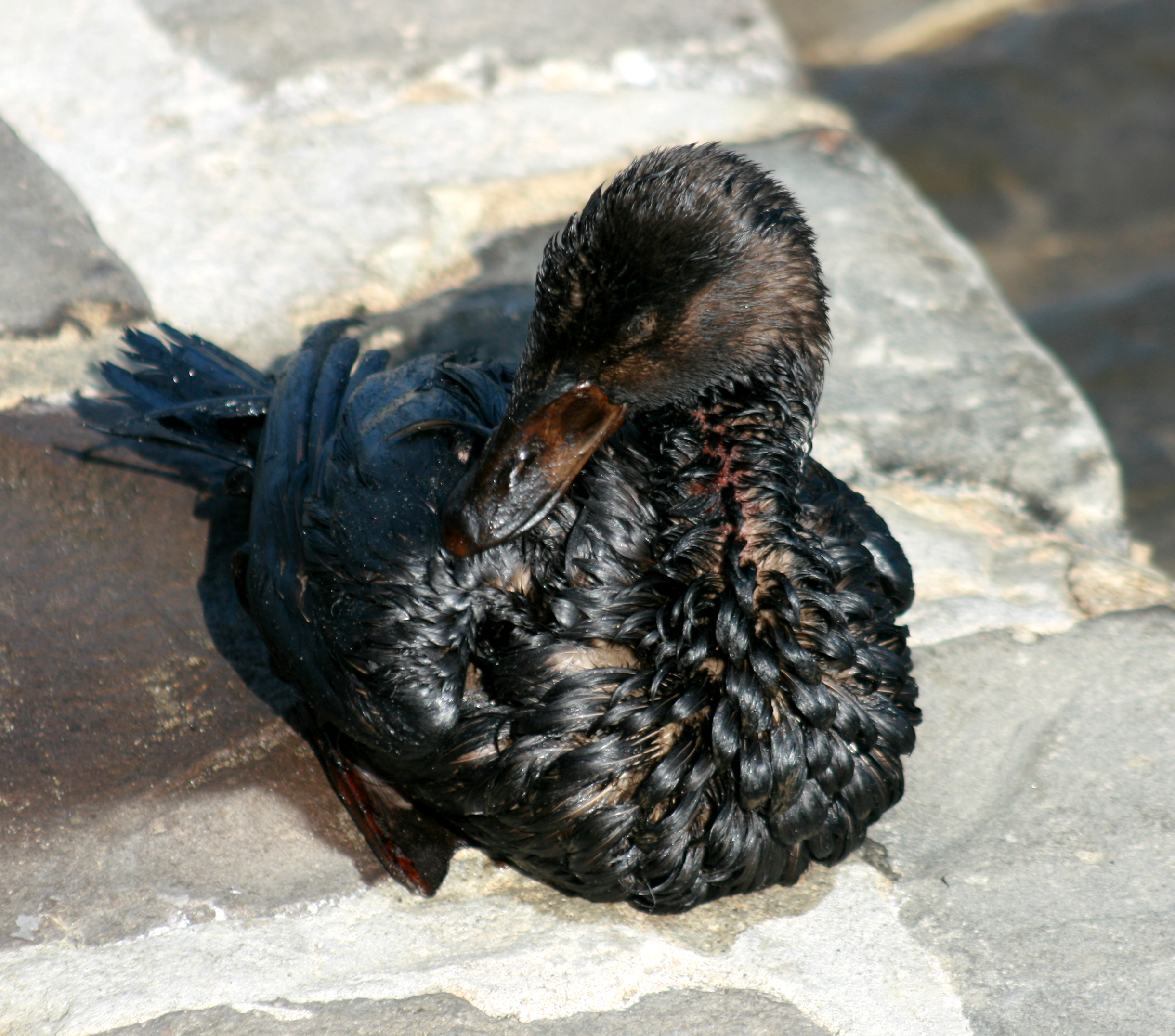
Surf scoter covered in oil as a result of the 2007 San Francisco Bay oil spill.

Exposure to oil (petroleum) can result in both external and internal damage to animals. It has the greatest impact on bird species, aquatic mammals, and other aquatic organisms. Affected wildlife can usually be identified via visual inspection, and can be treated if found early on. Major sources of such oil in the environment include accidental oil spills from off-shore sites, oil tankers, pipelines, and other facilities that store and process oil.

== Cause ==
The main cause of wildlife exposure to oil is oil spills. Oil spills occur most commonly near oil-shipping routes, pipelines, wells and refineries. Oil spills have a more drastic impact in the late winter and early spring months, because large populations of overwintering birds gather near shores. The Deepwater Horizon Oil Spill (also known as the BP Oil Spill) killed over 8,000 birds, sea turtles and marine mammals from April to September in 2010.

Animals come into direct contact with the oil, and may ingest, inhale or absorb it. Animals may also become contaminated by eating other contaminated animals.

== Species affected ==
Any animal can come into direct contact with an oil spill. However, marine species are more likely to be impacted by an oil spill.

=== Birds ===
Of the many species affected by direct exposure to oil, birds are usually the most severely affected. Birds that nest near the shoreline are most likely to be affected, including loons (Gavia spp.), grebes (Family: Podicipedidae), murres (Uria spp.), pelicans (Family: Pelecanidae), and penguins (Family: Spheniscidae). The species of bird and the type of oil can vary the effects of oil exposure. Birds affected often die from hypothermia, starvation, exhaustion, or drowning. Birds exposed to oil become more susceptible to other diseases due to a reduced immunologic function.

Birds can come into contact with oil through direct exposure, which leads to ingestion, inhalation, and absorption. Birds coated with oil lose the insulation and waterproofing properties of their feathers, and can also ingest oil during preening. Bird that are coated with oil lose the ability to thermo-regulate, fly, and float on water. Ingestion of oil can result in lung, liver and kidney damage, often leading to death. The oil can also affect the eggs laid by affected females, often resulting in embryonic death or low birth weight. 5-20 microliters of oil can kill embryos if the egg comes into contact. Eggs laid prior to an oil spill can also become damaged if an affected animal sits on the nest.

=== Mammals ===
Mammals are affected by oil spills in many of the same ways birds are, including organ damage, immune system suppression, skin irritation, and behavioral changes. It generally affects terrestrial mammals that feed on other affected animals that are directly exposed to oil. This includes scavengers, such as raccoons and skunks. It affects a variety of marine mammals, including sea otters (Enhydra lutris), whales (Order: Cetacea), dolphins (Suborder: Odontoceti), seals (Clade: Pinnipedia), and manatees (Trichechus spp.). Sea otters are among the most susceptible of marine mammals, because the oil interrupts their ability to trap air within their fur for insulation.

=== Other animals ===
Other species, such as marine turtles (Superfamily: Chelonioidea), fish, and shellfish can also be adversely affected by oil spills. Sea turtles may become affected when they return to shores to lay eggs. Fish are impacted by the oil that is taken in by their gills and digestive system. Many species of shellfish can survive exposure to oil, but accumulate high levels in containment in their bodies. Oil in water can contaminate algae, plankton, and fish eggs, which in turn contaminate fish that feed on them.

== Clinical signs ==
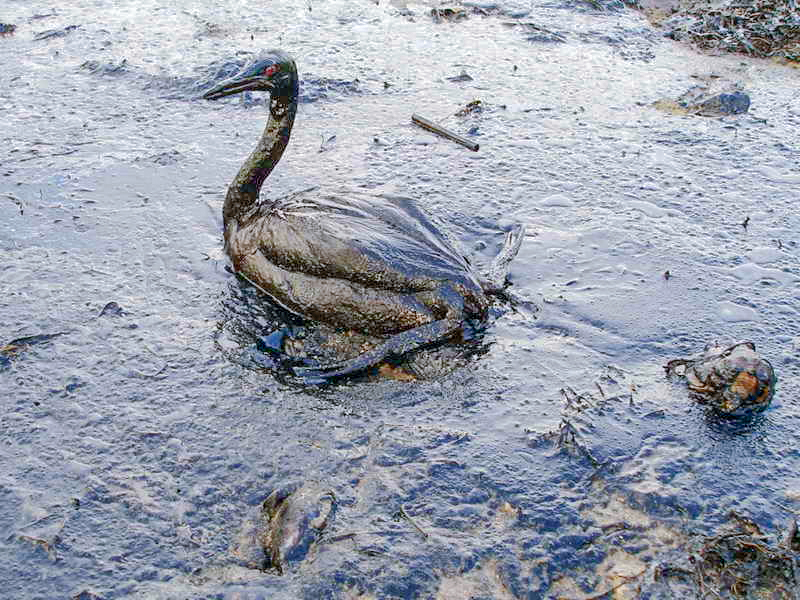
A bird covered in oil from the Black Sea Oil Spill.

Animals affected externally by oil can often be seen or found via the smell. In some light, transparent oils may be difficult to detect visually. Animals can also be internally diagnosed via necropsy by identifying petroleum hydrocarbons in their fat, liver, or kidney tissues For damage assessments, the death of the animal must have occurred after the oil spill.

The severity of damage directly correlates with the amount of oil spilled and the animal's exposure to oil. However, a small spill at a more sensitive season or environment may have more drastic impacts than a large spill in a less sensitive season or environment. External exposure to oil often leads to destroyed insulating fur or feathers, resulting in death from hypothermia. Contact with oil can also result in blindness, which impairs animals' ability to compete for food or to avoid predators.

The ingestion of oil can cause a variety of internal problems. These include anemia, reproductive impairment, and damage to the stomach and intestines. These animals can also suffer from dehydration and pneumonia, due to a decreased thermo-regulation.

== Treatment ==
Animals affected by oil should be cleaned and allowed to recover from stress. Animals should be kept in a quiet and warm environment while they recover. Direct contact with oil or oiled wildlife can be hazardous to human health, so it is recommended that treatment be performed by people who have received training.
