= Joe FM =

Joe FM may refer to:

- TV 38.9 KZHO-LD and 87.9 KJIB-LP JoeFM.net, and TV and radio station in Houston, Texas
- Joe FM (Belgium), a nationwide commercial radio station in Belgium
- 97.3 Joe FM or WMJO, a radio station licensed to Essexville, Michigan, United States
- CKNG-FM, a radio station licensed to Edmonton, Alberta, Canada, previously known as Joe FM
- Joe FM
