= Bay du Nord River =

Coordinates: 47°42′47.67″N 55°25′01.85″W

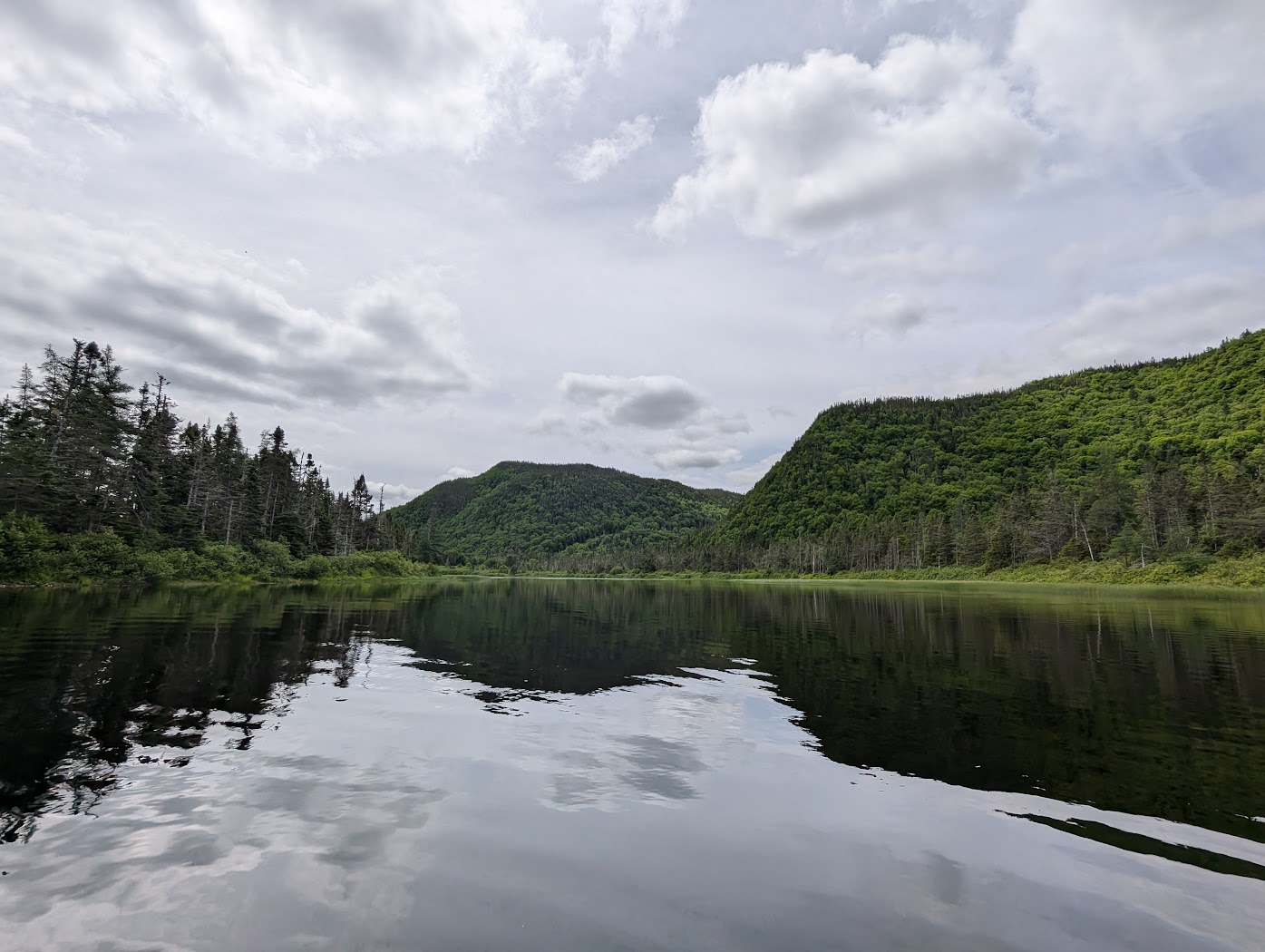
Bay du Nord River

Mouth of the Bay du Nord River

The Bay du Nord River is located on the south coast of the Island of Newfoundland in the Canadian province of Newfoundland and Labrador. Much of the drainage basin is contained within the Middle Ridge Wildlife Reserve and the Bay du Nord Wilderness Reserve of central Newfoundland.

The river empties into the Gulf of St. Lawrence at Fortune Bay, just north of the community of Pool's Cove on Newfoundland's Connaigre Peninsula.

The river was nominated as a Canadian Heritage River in June 1992 and designated in 2006.

== See also ==
- List of rivers of Newfoundland and Labrador
