= Yus Rural LLG =

Local-level government in Papua New Guinea

- Location within Papua New Guinea
- Coordinates: 6.054°S 146.755°E
- Country: Papua New Guinea
- Province: Morobe Province
- Time zone: UTC+10 (AEST)

Yus Rural LLG is a local-level government (LLG) of Morobe Province, Papua New Guinea.

== Wards ==
- 01. Yawan Worin
- 02. Sugan
- 03. Boksawin
- 04. Dinangat (Kutong language speakers)
- 05. Gorgiok
- 06. Bungawat
- 07. Mek Nolum
- 08. Urop Isan
- 09. Wadabong
- 10. Nokopo
- 11. Gua Gangulut
- 12. Kumbul Taps
- 13. Mengan Numbo
