= Joes Mountain =

Joes Mountain may refer to:

- Joes Mountain (Montana), a mountain in Lewis and Clark County, Montana
- Joes Mountain (South Carolina)

== See also ==
- Joe Devel Peak
