= Joey =

Joey may refer to:

== People ==
- Joey (name)

== Animals ==
- Joey (marsupial), an infant marsupial
- Joey, a blue-fronted Amazon parrot who was one of the Blue Peter pets

== Film and television ==
- Joey (1977 film), an American film directed by Horace Jackson
- Joey (1985 film), a German horror film directed by Roland Emmerich
- Joey (1986 film), an American film directed by Joseph Ellison
- Joey (1997 film), an Australian film directed by Ian Barry
- Joey (TV series), a spin-off of the Friends television series

== Music ==
- Joey (album), 2014 album by Danish singer Joey Moe
- "Joey" (Bob Dylan song), from the 1976 album Desire
- "Joey" (Concrete Blonde song), a song by Concrete Blonde from their 1990 album Bloodletting
- "Joey" (Sugarland song), by Sugarland from their 2008 album Love on the Inside
- "Joey", a 1954 song by Betty Madigan
- "Joey", a song by Bon Jovi from their 2002 album Bounce

== Sports ==
- Joey, a type of return in pickleball
- Australia national under-17 football team, nicknamed The Joeys

== Other uses ==
- Nickname of a Britten-Norman Trislander aircraft (registration G-JOEY) - see Aurigny
- JOEY-DTV, callsign for Ehime Asahi Television
- Joey (restaurant), a Western Canadian restaurant chain
- Joey, a name for Continental Rummy
- Joey's Seafood Restaurants, a chain in Canada
- Nickname of the British predecimal threepence coin
