= Yefyus =

Island in Indonesia

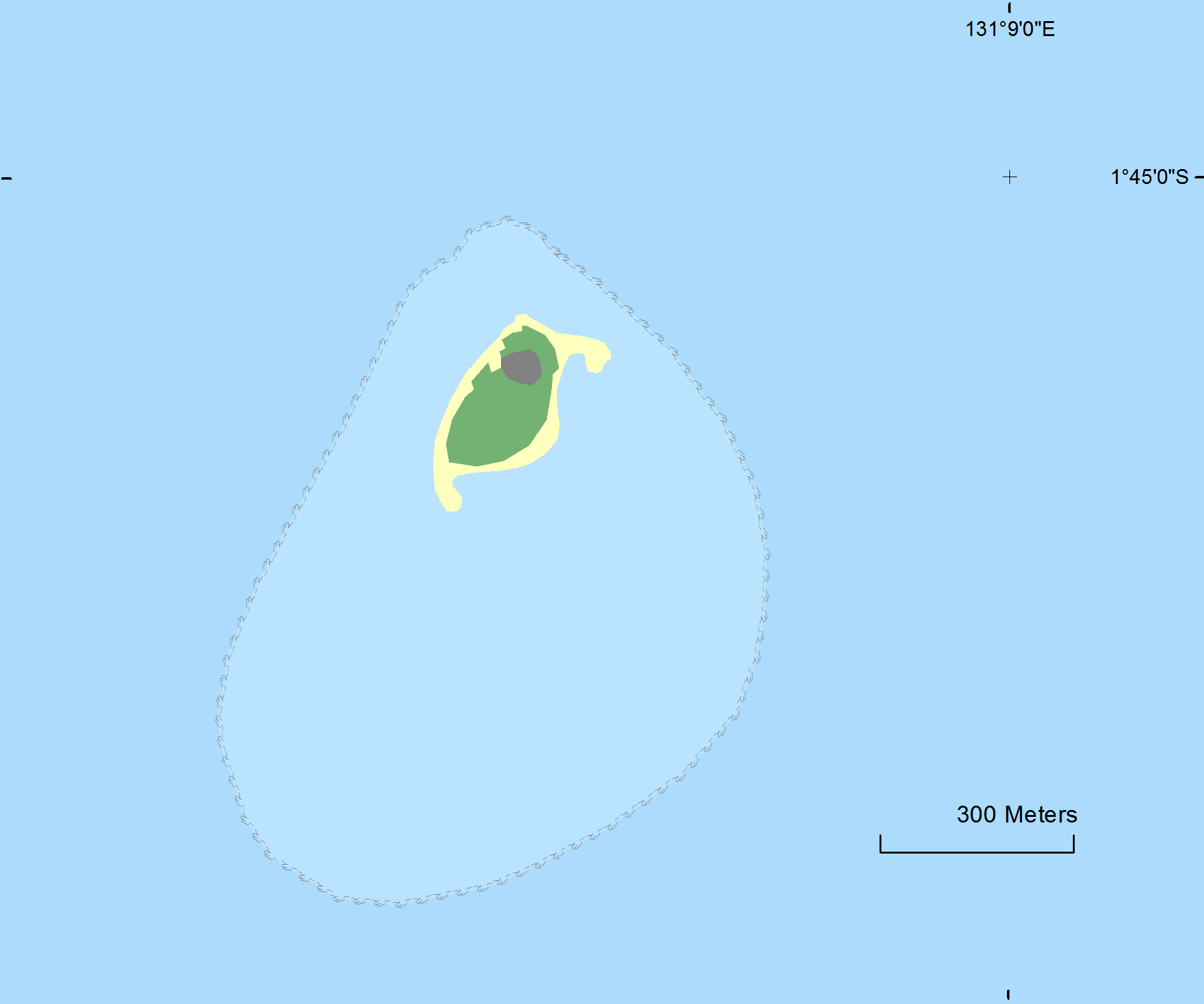
- The island of Yefyus surrounded by a coral reef

Geography
- Coordinates: 1.753082°S 131.142914°E

Administration
- Indonesia

Location of Yefyus to the southwest of the New Guinea mainland and to the east of the island of Misool

Yefyus is a small island in the shallow sea south of the Bird's Head Peninsula of New Guinea. It is known in Indonesian as Pulau Yus (transl. Yus Island), and its name was previously spelt using the Dutch orthography as Jef Joes. It is located 27 kilometres (17 mi) south-southwest of the promontory of Tanjung Wamonket in the northwest of the Bird's Head mainland, 35 kilometres (22 mi) east-southeast of the isolated island of Yefyal, and 45 kilometres (28 mi) northwest of the islands of Efkasya in the archipelago off Misool.

Yefyus is about 300 meters long and 150 meters wide, and is in the middle of a coral reef. The land is covered by a patch of forest, which is surrounded by beaches of coral sand. There is a tower with a light on the island, and on the edge of the reef a shipwreck.

== Sources ==
- Sailing directions (enroute) : New Guinea (PDF). National Geospatial-intelligence Agency. 2018. p. 117. Archived from the original (PDF) on 2019-08-21.
