= Hap Wilson =

David "Hap" Wilson is a Canadian naturalist, canoe tripper, author, illustrator and photographer. He has published numerous Canadian canoe-route guides and books about wilderness life.

== Works ==
- Grey Owl and Me, ISBN 9781554887323 with Dundurn Press
- Trails and Tribulations, ISBN 9781554883974 with Dundurn Press
- The Cabin, ISBN 9781897045053 with Dundurn Press
- Canoeing, Kayaking & Hiking Temagami, ISBN 1-55046-434-5
- Canoeing and Hiking Wild Muskoka, ISBN 1-55046-339-X
- Riviere Dumoine, ISBN 0-9693258-0-0
- Rivers of the Upper Ottawa Valley, ISBN 1-55046-438-8
- Missinaibi: Journey to the Northern Sky, ISBN 1-895465-08-7
- Wilderness Rivers of Manitoba
- Wilderness Manitoba: Land Where the Spirit Lives
