= Coral sand =

Carbonate sand formed in warm oceans

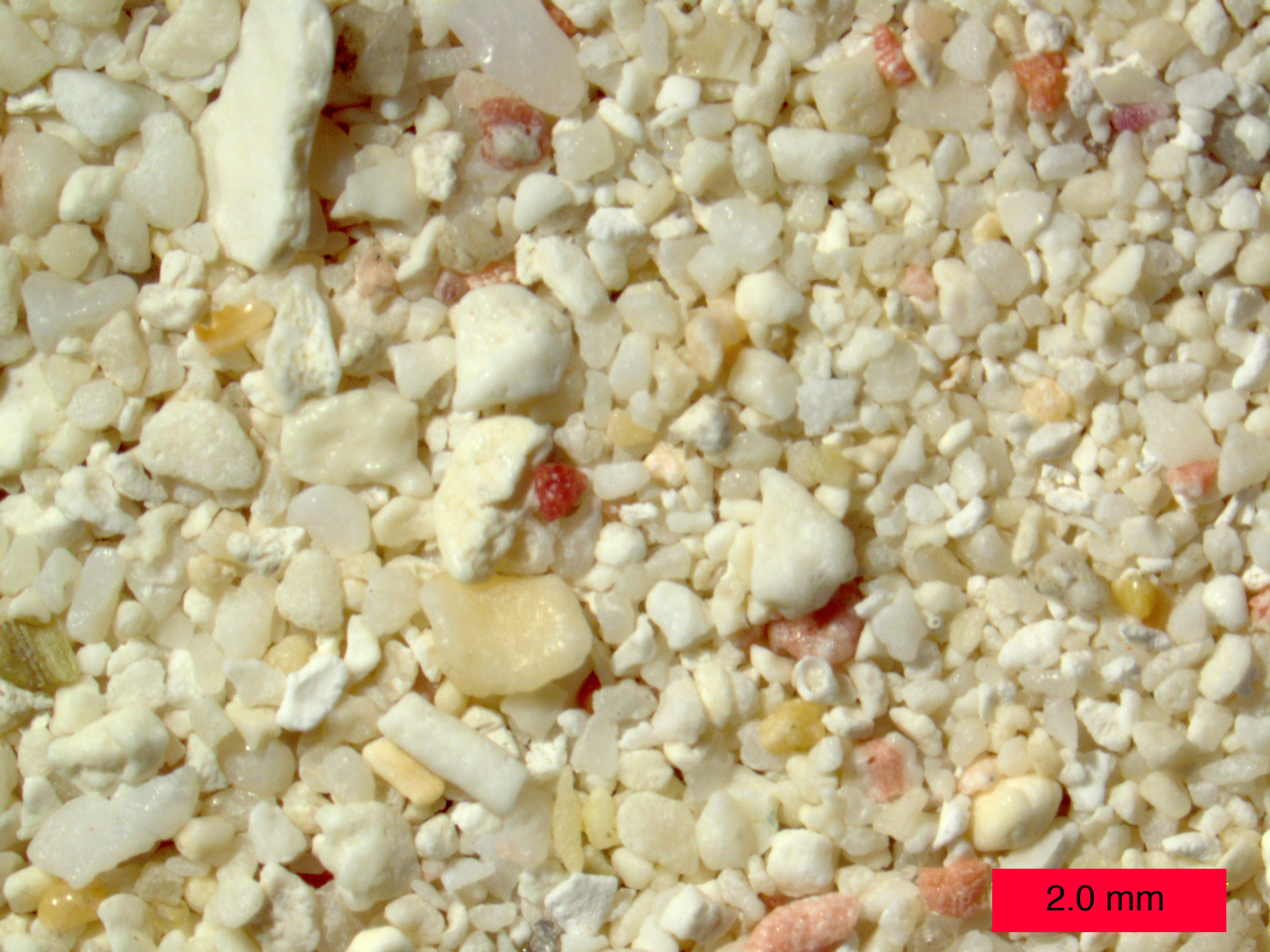
Coral sand from a beach on Aruba

Coral sand is a form of aragonite sand particles originating in tropical and sub-tropical marine environments primarily from bioerosion of limestone skeletal material of marine organisms. Often, this is due to corallivores, such as parrotfish, which excrete sand after digestion. However, the term "coral" in coral sand is used loosely in this sense to mean limestone of recent biological origin; corals are not the dominant contributors of sand particles to most such deposits. Rather, coral sand is a mix of coral and/or remnant skeletal fragments of foraminifera, calcareous algae, molluscs, and crustaceans . Because it is composed of limestone, coral sand is acid-soluble.

== Environmental issues ==
Coral sand mining is a significant industry in some areas, and can have damaging environmental effects. Over 500,000 tons of coral sand were mined annually from Mauritius until being banned in October 2001. Many Comoros beaches have been scarred by sand mining. Over 250 tons of shells and corals were exported from Tanzania in 1974. Exploitive collection has moved from the depleted areas off Tanzania and Kenya to the islands of Zanzibar and Mafia.

Such extensive mining can be very harmful to reef ecosystems and beaches. It is estimated that, at the current rate of consumption, the supply of living coral rock from inner atoll ‘faros’ in North Malé will be exhausted within 30 years.

== See also ==
- Coral rag
