= Newfoundland and Labrador Route 360 =

Highway in Newfoundland and Labrador, Canada

Route 360
- Bay d'Espoir Highway
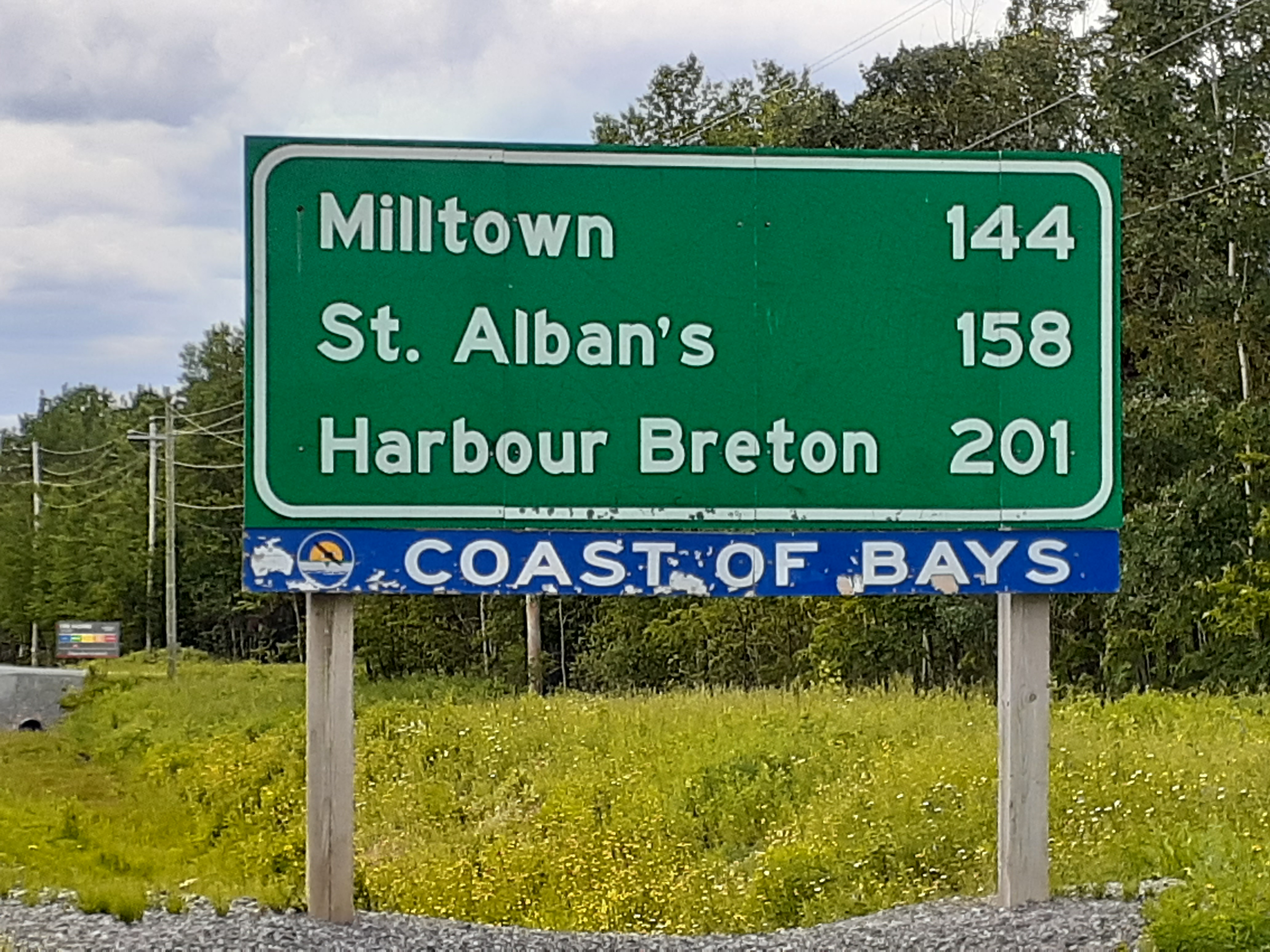

Route information
- Maintained by Newfoundland and Labrador Department of Transportation and Infrastructure
- Length: 204 km (127 mi)

Major junctions
- South end: Harbour Breton
- Route 364 north of Harbour Breton; Route 362 west of Pool's Cove; Route 365 east of Morrisville; Route 361 east of Milltown–Head of Bay d'Espoir
- North end: Route 1 (TCH) in Bishop's Falls

Location
- Country: Canada
- Province: Newfoundland and Labrador

Highway system
- Highways in Newfoundland and Labrador
← Route 352	→ Route 361

Route 360, also known as Bay d'Espoir Highway, is a provincial highway in Newfoundland and Labrador. It runs from the Bishop's Falls area to Bay d'Espoir and Harbour Breton. The road is very isolated for at least 140 kilometres (87 mi), where there are no communities or stops to refuel. Bishop's Falls and Harbour Breton are the only two settlements of any size along the entire length of Route 360, with other towns and communities being along the other highways it intersects.

Cell phone reception along Route 360 is severely limited. In 2022, Route 360 was voted the second Worst Road in Atlantic Canada by the Canadian Automobile Association's Worst Roads list.

== Route description ==
Route 360 begins as Southside Drive in Harbour Breton at a dead end along the coast of Fortune Bay. It winds its way west through neighbourhoods before bypassing downtown along Canada Drive. The highway now leaves Harbour Breton and winds its way northward up the entire length of the Connaigre Peninsula to have an intersection with Route 364 (Hermitage River Road). Route 360 heads up the Hermitage River Valley to pass by Hardy's Cove and have an intersection with Route 362 (Belleoram Road) before winding its way through remote, scenic, and hilly terrain for the next several kilometres. The highway now passes by Jipujijkuei Kuespem Provincial Park and has intersections with Route 365 (Conne River Road) and Route 361 (St. Alban's Road), where it crosses the Conne River before heading through remote wilderness for the next 140 kilometres (87 mi), where the highway crosses the Northwest Gander River. Route 360 now enters the outskirts of Bishop's Falls, where the comes to an end at an intersection with Route 1 (Trans-Canada Highway).

== Major intersections ==
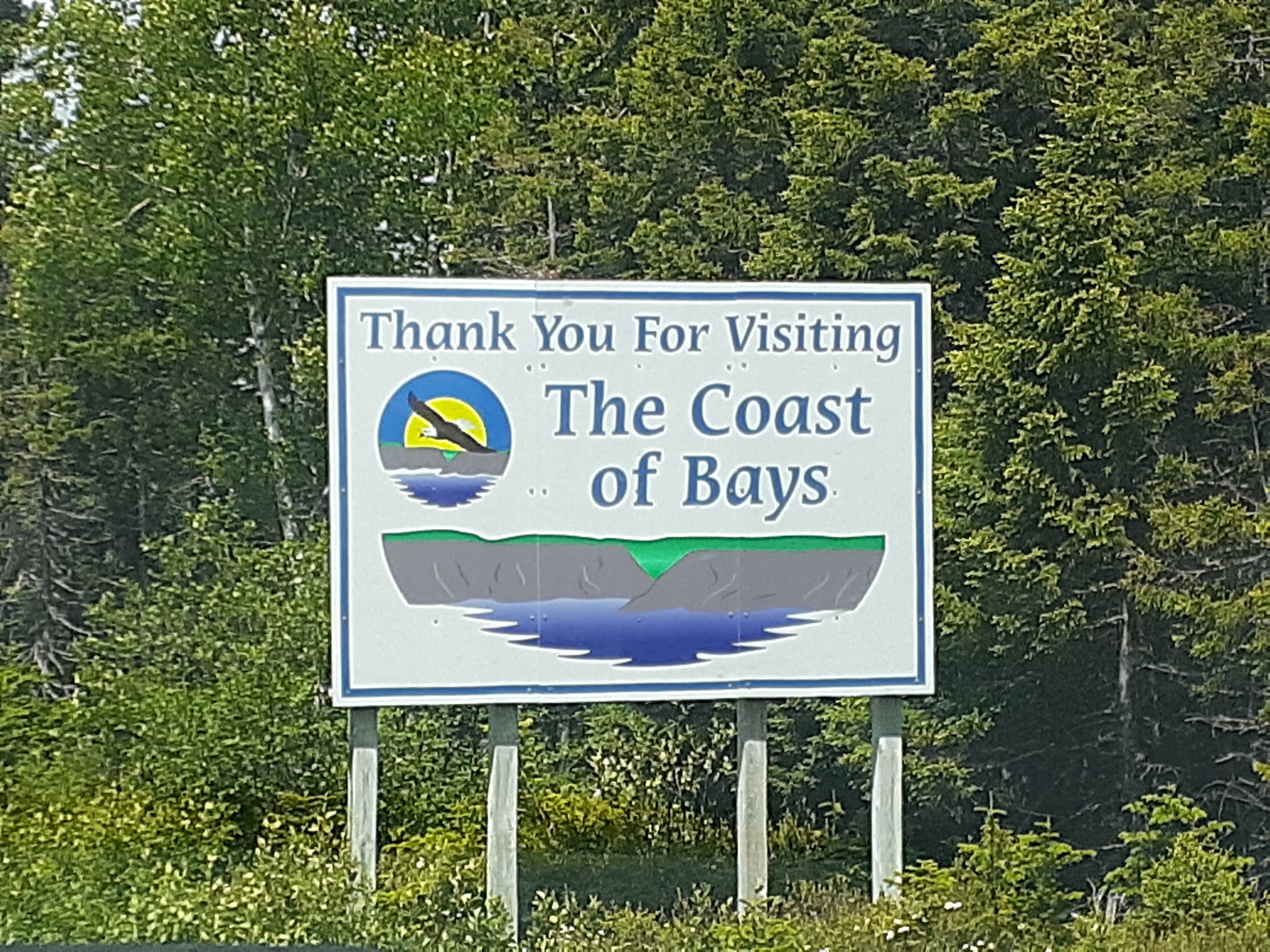
Coast of Bays is a major region on Newfoundland's South Coast

Location	km	mi	Destinations	Notes
Harbour Breton	0.0	0.0	Dead End	Southern terminus
	29.3	18.2	Route 364 south (Hermitage River Road) – Hermitage, Seal Cove	Northern terminus of Route 364; provides access to the Gaultois and McCallum passenger-service Ferry
Hardy's Cove	34.5	21.4	Hardy's Cove Road - Hardy's Cove	
	42.2	26.2	Route 362 south (Belleoram Road) – Pool's Cove, Belleoram	Northern terminus of Route 362; provides access to Rencontre East passenger-service Ferry at Pool's Cove
	71.1	44.2	Jipujijkuei Kuespem Provincial Park main entrance	Access road into park
	73.3	45.5	Route 365 south (Conne River Road) – Conne River, Miawpukek First Nation	Northern terminus of Route 365
	77.0	47.8	Route 361 west (St. Alban's Road) – Milltown, St. Alban's	Eastern terminus of Route 361
Bishop's Falls	204	127	Route 1 (TCH) – Grand Falls-Windsor, Gander	Northern terminus
1.000 mi = 1.609 km; 1.000 km = 0.621 mi

== See also ==
- Bay d'Espoir
- Connaigre Peninsula
- Miawpukek First Nation
- List of Newfoundland and Labrador highways
