= Newfoundland and Labrador Route 364 =

Highway in Newfoundland and Labrador, Canada

Route 364
- Hermitage River Road

Route information
- Maintained by Newfoundland and Labrador Department of Transportation and Infrastructure
- Length: 37.4 km (23.2 mi)

Major junctions
- South end: Seal Cove
- North end: Route 360 north of Harbour Breton

Location
- Country: Canada
- Province: Newfoundland and Labrador

Highway system
- Highways in Newfoundland and Labrador
← Route 363	→ Route 365

Route 364, also known as Hermitage River Road, is a 37.4-kilometre-long (23.2 mi) north–south highway on the Connaigre Peninsula of the island of Newfoundland. It connects the towns of Seal Cove and Hermitage-Sandyville with Route 360 (Bay d'Espoir Highway).

== Route description ==
Route 364 begins on the coast of Hermitage Bay in Seal Cove, where the road continues west as a gravel road to the former townsites of Grole and Pass Island. It winds its way northeast along the coastline to enter Hermitage-Sandyville, where it passes through Dawson's Cove (Sandyville) before passing through Hermitage, where it has an intersection with Main Street, which provides access to ferries leading to Gaultois and McCallum. The highway travels northeast and farther inland through hilly terrain for several kilometres, where it has an intersection with a local road leading to Furby's Cove. Route 364 continues northeast for several kilometres before coming to an end at an intersection with Route 360. As with most highways in Newfoundland and Labrador, the entire length of Route 364 is a two-lane highway.

== Major intersections ==
Location	km	mi	Destinations	Notes
Seal Cove	0.0	0.0	Pass Island Road - Pass Island, Grole	End of provincial maintenance; southern terminus
Hermitage-Sandyville	15.7	9.8	Main Street - Downtown Hermitage, Gaultois and McCallum Ferry	Francois, another isolated community, can also be accessed via McCallum through the Francois – Grey River – Burgeo ferry route.
	26.1	16.2	Furby's Cove Road - Furby's Cove	
	37.4	23.2	Route 360 (Bay d'Espoir Highway) to Route 1 (TCH) – St. Alban's, Harbour Breton	Northern terminus
1.000 mi = 1.609 km; 1.000 km = 0.621 mi
