= Newfoundland and Labrador Route 365 =

Highway in Newfoundland and Labrador, Canada

Route 365
- Conne River Road

Route information
- Maintained by Newfoundland and Labrador Department of Transportation and Infrastructure
- Length: 17.5 km (10.9 mi)

Major junctions
- South end: Conne River
- North end: Route 360 near Morrisville

Location
- Country: Canada
- Province: Newfoundland and Labrador

Highway system
- Highways in Newfoundland and Labrador
← Route 364	→ Route 370

Route 365, also known as Conne River Road, is a 17.5-kilometre-long (10.9 mi) north–south highway on the island of Newfoundland in the Canadian province of Newfoundland and Labrador. It serves as the only road connection to the town of Conne River and the Miawpukek First Nation, connecting them with Route 360 (Bay d'Espoir Highway). It is a two-lane highway for its entire length and parallels the Conne River, the actual river, for the majority of its length, when its not following the banks of Bay d'Espoir.

== Major intersections ==
Location	km	mi	Destinations	Notes
Conne River	0.0	0.0	Dead End	Southern terminus
	17.5	10.9	Route 360 (Bay d'Espoir Highway) to Route 1 (TCH) – Bishop's Falls, Hermitage, Harbour Breton	Northern terminus
1.000 mi = 1.609 km; 1.000 km = 0.621 mi
