= St. Joseph's Cove, Newfoundland and Labrador =

St. Joseph's Cove may refer to:

- St. Joseph's Cove-St. Veronica's, Newfoundland and Labrador Bay D'Espoir
- St. Joseph's Cove, Bonne Bay, Newfoundland and Labrador
