= Newfoundland and Labrador Route 361 =

Highway in Newfoundland and Labrador

Route 361
- St. Alban’s Road

Route information
- Maintained by Newfoundland and Labrador Department of Transportation and Infrastructure
- Length: 30.0 km (18.6 mi)

Major junctions
- West end: St. Alban's
- East end: Route 360 near Milltown-Head of Bay d'Espoir

Location
- Country: Canada
- Province: Newfoundland and Labrador

Highway system
- Highways in Newfoundland and Labrador
← Route 360	→ Route 362

Route 361, also known as St. Alban's Road, is a 30.0-kilometre-long (18.6 mi) east–west highway on the island of Newfoundland in the Canadian province of Newfoundland and Labrador. It connects the communities along the western and northern sides of Bay d'Espoir with Route 360 (Bay d'Espoir Highway).

== Route description ==
Route 361 begins in downtown St. Alban's at an intersection between Beachside Drive, Gully Road, and Main Street. The highway winds its way north through town along Main Street before leaving and heading north through rural areas after crossing a river. It now runs along the west side of the northernmost reaches of the Bay as the road passes through St. Joseph's Cove and St. Veronica's, where it turns east to cross the bay via a Causeway/bridge and has an intersection with a local road leading to Camp Boggy and the Bay d'Espoir Hydroelectric Power Station. Route 361 winds its southeast along the shores of the bay to pass through Milltown-Head of Bay d'Espoir, where it heads through the Head of Bay d'Espoir portion of town to cross another river and has an intersection with a local road leading to Milltown and Morrisville. The highway now passes through rural wooded terrain for several kilometres before coming to an end at an intersection with Route 360. As with most highways in Newfoundland and Labrador, Route 361 is entirely a two-Lane highway.

== Major intersections ==
Location	km	mi	Destinations	Notes
St. Alban's	0.0	0.0	Main Street / Beachside Drive / Gully Road	End of provincial maintenance; western terminus; road continues as Main Street
St. Veronica's	12.9	8.0	Camp Boggy Road (Route 361-11) - Camp Boggy, Bay d'Espoir Hydroelectric Power Station	
Head of Bay d'Espoir	18.6	11.6	Main Street (Route 361-10) - Milltown, Morrisville	
	30.0	18.6	Route 360 (Bay d'Espoir Highway) to Route 1 (TCH) – Bishop's Falls, Hermitage, Harbour Breton	Eastern terminus
1.000 mi = 1.609 km; 1.000 km = 0.621 mi
