= Sandyville =

Sandyville may refer to:

- Sandyville, Iowa, United States
- Sandyville, Newfoundland and Labrador, Canada
- Sandyville, Ohio, United States
- Sandyville, West Virginia, United States
