= Pass Island, Newfoundland and Labrador =

Community in Newfoundland and Labrador, Canada

Coordinates: 47°29′23″N 56°11′43″W

Pass Island is a resettled community located on the Southern Shore of Newfoundland and Labrador, Canada. Many remnants from previous settlements are still visible across the ocean separating it from the community of Seal Cove, Fortune Bay. Many of the settlers from previously existent insular communities of Pass Island, were resettled to the communities of Hermitage-Sandyville and Harbour Breton.
