= Minnie White (musician) =

Canadian musician (1916–2002)

- Birth name: Mary Agnes Hoskins
- Born: 1916; St. Alban's, Dominion of Newfoundland
- Died: 2002 (aged 85–86)
- Genres: Folk
- Occupation: Musician
- Instrument: Accordion

Minnie White CM (1916 – 2002) was a traditional Newfoundland musician who became known as the "First Lady of the Accordion" in the 1960s and 1970s.

== Biography ==
White was born Mary Agnes Hoskins, in St. Alban's, Bay d'Espoir, on the southeast coast of what was then the Dominion of Newfoundland. She was introduced to music by her father, Samuel Hoskins, who played mouth organ, fiddle and accordion. White could play the accordion by the time she was 8 years old, and at 16, when her family moved to the Codroy Valley, she played piano to accompany fiddlers at community dances.

In 1937, she married Richard White and they settled in the community of Tompkins. After starting a family, White gave up regular performing for many years. She played piano and organ, but it wasn't until the 1960s that she returned to the accordion. In addition to playing the tunes she'd learned as a child, she began to compose her own songs, and for 13 years played a regular Sunday afternoon gig at the Starlite Lounge in Tompkins. White composed and arranged music, hired backing bands, and performed on accordion and mandolin.

In 1973, Minnie White recorded her first album, Newfoundland's First Lady of the Accordion. She toured Newfoundland and Nova Scotia, and made television appearances on shows such as The Root Seller and Canadian Express, becoming part of the Newfoundland traditional music revival of the 1960s and 1970s. She recorded four albums, including Newfoundland Accordion & Mandolin Favourites (1974), Homestead Reels (1978) and The Hills of Home (1994).

White was awarded the Order of Canada in 1993. In 1994 she was inducted into the Newfoundland and Labrador Arts Council Hall of Honour, and in 1995 nominated for Instrumental Artist of the Year at the East Coast Music Awards. During the summer of 1998 the community of Upper Ferry declared "Minnie White Day" in her honour.

White continued performing at festivals and special events until her death in 2002.
