= Noel Jeddore =

Noel Joseph Jeddore
- We’jitu

Mi’kmaq leader
- In office July 26, 1919 – 1924
- Preceded by: Saqamaw Lupe'n Reuben Lewis, Olibia Chief of the Newfoundland Mi'kmaq from 1900 - 1919

Saqamaw Geodol (Jeddore)

Personal details
- Born: December 18, 1865 Indian Point, Bay d'Espoir
- Died: May 14, 1944 (aged 78) Eskasoni, Cape Breton
- Spouse: Dinah Morris Geodol (Jeddore)
- Children: Peter (Piet) Francis Jeddore (May 9, 1892 – May 18, 1970), 6 other children
- Parent(s): Nicholas Jeddore and Ann Benoit
- Known for: Saqmaw Chief, of the Mi’kmaq of Newfoundland Taqm
- Mother tongue: Lnu’isimk

Noel Joseph Jeddore We’jitu also Newell Jeddore Gietol, Geodol (December 18, 1865 – May 14, 1944) was Saqamaw "grand chief" of the Mi'kmaq at Miawpukek in Bay d'Espoir on the south coast of Newfoundland in the Coast of Islands region. Jeddore served as chief from July 26, 1919 until he was forced into exile to Eskasoni, Nova Scotia, in 1924. He was born at Indian Point, Bay d'Espoir and he died at Eskasoni, Cape Breton.

== Saqamaw ==
The name "Jeddore" can be traced back to We’jitu Isidore, (ca. 1656 – ca. 1769) who "was a Kji-Saqamaw or grand chief of the Mi’kmaq of the provinces of New Brunswick, Newfoundland and Labrador, Nova Scotia and Quebec." Prior to the passage of the 1876 Indian Act, the Mi'kmaq were governed by the Grand Council - Santé Mawiómi - made up of representatives from the seven district councils in Mi'kma'ki. The chief of the Newfoundland Mi'kmak was Reuben Lewis, who was elected as probationary chief in 1900 following the death of Joe Bernard. In June 1907 Reuben Lewis was to "go in state with the principal men of Conn River to Sydney to be invested with the full right of chieftainship and the possession of the gold medal which is the badge of office." As chief, Noel Jeddore was given guardianship of the gold medal first given to the previous district Chief Maurice Lewis by the Grand Council. Maurice Lewis came to Miawipukek originally from Cape Breton in 1815. When he left Miawpukek Jerrold hung the medal on the statue of St. Anne near the Catholic Church. The priest, St. Croix, who deposed Chief Noel Jeddore in 1924 "was also responsible for dismantling traditional governing structures in the community."

Lewis as chief made settled disputes about territorial trapping areas and his decisions were final. Noel Jeddore was known as Saqamaw Jeddore or Geodol to the Mi'kmaq of Miawpukek/Conne River. In a 1907 publication Newfoundland and It's Untrodden Ways by Millais (1865 – 1931) the author included his favourable observations of the Jeddore family and other Conne River Mi'kmaq during his visits to Newfoundland in "two short hunting seasons in 1905-1906." Millais observed that in the absence of a Catholic priest Conne River at Christmas time, Joe Jeddore was "high priest."

== Miawpukek ==
Miawpukek was a summer camp until Jeannot Pequidalouet - the eastern Mi'kmaq chief of Cape Breton, who had previously overwintered in Newfoundland - began to create a permanent settlement in Miawpukek from in the 1760s. In his MA thesis Butler citing Jackson described how under the leadership of Jeddore, the Mi’kmaq in the Bay D’Espoir "lived in greater isolation and so were able both to retain their language well into the twentieth century and to continue their traditional practices of living as hunter-gatherers and commercial trappers." Jackson described how, the "uninhabited wilderness of the southern interior offered an abundant variety of small game: fox, muskrat and beaver. Thousands of woodland caribou roamed the bush and barrens." Prior to the early nineteenth century Mi'kmaq lived a nomadic life moving in cycles and seasons between Newfoundland and Cape Breton. In the late eighteenth or early nineteenth century they made a transition to semi-sedentary life as hunter-gatherers living "on the country" on Newfoundland itself in permanent communities lime St. George's Bay and Miawpukek in Bay d'Espoir. In a 1907 publication Newfoundland and It's Untrodden Ways by John Guille Millais' (1865 – 1931) the author included his favourable observations of the Jeddore family and other Conne River Mi'kmaq during his visits to Newfoundland in "two short hunting seasons in 1905-1906." Like William Cormack who had undertaken an expedition in 1822 to the interior of Newfoundland with his Mi'kmaq guide Joseph Sylvester, a young Mi'kmaq hunter from Miawpukek, Bay d'Espoir, he provided details on the lives of the Newfoundland Mi'kmaq.

Newfoundland Governor William MacGregor visited Bay d'Espoir in September 1908. In his report he described how the lives of Mi'kmaq on the reserve were becoming more difficult with the encroachment of the railway, a mill and settlers which contributed to the depletion of natural resources on their traditional hunting lands. MacGregor described how the Mi'kmaq there were "hunters and trappers, and are ignorant alike of agriculture, of seamanship, and of fishing... They pay 60 to 70 cents a pound for their tobacco, 20 to 30 cents for gunpowder, and 10 cents for shot. They sell their fur locally where they make their small family purchases." Although he acknowledged that they were healthy and free of tuberculosis, resourceful, self-sufficient, "easy to govern", "seldom quarrel", with "no intoxicating liquor and seldom obtain any", he predicted that their future on the reserve was bleak. The only two cows on the reserve were owned by the Jeddore brothers. MacGregor explained that the Chieftainship was "not hereditary, but is conferred, when a vacancy occurs, on the man the people prefer."

== Controversy ==
The Mi'kmaq at Bay d'Espoir had converted to Catholicism when an early French missionary came to the area and continued to be devout Catholics. They built the first chapel in Bay d’Espoir, Conne River in the 1870s even though there was never a regular parish priest. As chief of the Mi'kmaq, Noel Jeddore was the guardian of a prayer book watermarked in 1807 that he used for Sunday mass and other religious services - deciphering the Komqwej wi’kasikl - Mi'kmaq hieroglyphics. The prayer book which was "originally given by the missionaries and was in Mi’kmaq" - was used "firstly within the wigwam, then the village chapel and later at [St. Anne's Roman Catholic Church]."

According to Noel Jeddore's son, Peter Jeddore (May 9, 1892 – May 18, 1970), his father was exiled because of a misunderstanding with the Catholic priest, Father Stanislaus (Stanley) St. Croix, who arrived in 1916 and was based in St. Alban's as parish priest and school administrator and priest. Ethnographer Doug Jackson - who "began research in [Miawpukek] in 1976 and lived there until 1981" - observed that St. Croix - who forbid the use of traditional language in the church and in the school, was the primary force behind the acceleration of the loss of the Mi'kmaw language in the early twentieth century. St. Croix "told teachers to strictly enforce the use of English in the classroom. Children were to be strapped if they reverted to Micmac, and he banned the use of Micmac in church.". Jackson wrote that Mi'kmaw Rod Jeddore indicated that, "the impact of intermarriage, economic climate, and Fr. St. Croix's ban on language" were "the primary reasons for the decline of Mi'kmaw language in the area and by the 1980s the language had largely disappeared." "These acts together with other forces of change (including the opening of the interior of the island and increased intermarriage with Europeans) left only three fluent speakers of Mi’kmaq in the community by the mid-1980s."

When the first regular priest Father Stanislaus St. Croix arrived in 1916 he wanted the Mi'kmaq to join his parish in St. Albans instead of holding services in their own church. St. Croix wanted the Mi'kmaq to stop saying their prayers - particularly in the church - in Mi'kmaq as he thought it "mocked God." During an impassioned community meeting in 1923 Noel Jeddore said that "if we stopped speaking Mi’kmaq in the church, there would be murder in our hearts." When community members reported this to St. Croix he interpreted it to mean that Jeddore was threatening murder. He called the RCMP and Jeddore was given the choice of going to jail or exile. He along with some community members chose to go to a Mi’kmaq reserve in Eskasoni, Cape Breton with very close ties to the Conne River community. Noel Jeddore appointed his son as Chief in the 1920s but his son refused. According to American anthropologist and University of Pennsylvania professor Frank Speck, one of his older Mi'kmaq informants described in detail how the Mi'kmaq made the sixty mile voyage across the Cabot Strait between Cape Ray on the south-western coast of Newfoundland and Cape North, Cape Breton in two days by birch bark canoes.

According to the Miawpukek First Nation, Jeddore said: "One time before they became Christians, Mi’kmaw were very strong, not even bullets could hurt them. But when they became Christian, they turned into a very weak people".
