= Bay d'Espoir Academy =

Coordinates: 47.9199°N 55.7441°W

Information
- Established: 2003; 22 years ago
- Grades: K-12

Bay d'Espoir Academy is a K-12 school in St. Alban's, Newfoundland and Labrador, Canada that serves the Bay d'Espoir region of the south coast in Central Newfoundland. The principal is Steven Buffet and the vice-principal is Rebecca Parsons-Burden. The school operates under the Newfoundland and Labrador English School District.

In 2003-2004, Greenwood Academy and Holy Cross High were consolidated to form Bay d’Espoir Academy.

The original school was located in the neighboring community of Milltown, until 2017. In January 2017, Bay d'Espoir Academy, along with the local RCMP detachment and Milltown Town Hall/Fire Department, was set ablaze in an act of arson. The gymnasium, main offices, and primary and elementary sections of the building were completely lost in the fire while the high school section suffered extensive smoke and water damage. The staff and their approximately 250 students had to relocate to another building in the neighbouring town of St. Alban's. A new school was built on a parcel of land in St. Alban's with construction scheduled to be completed by 2021–2022. The new school opened in October 2021.
