= Hurricane Matthew =

Category 5 Atlantic hurricane in 2016

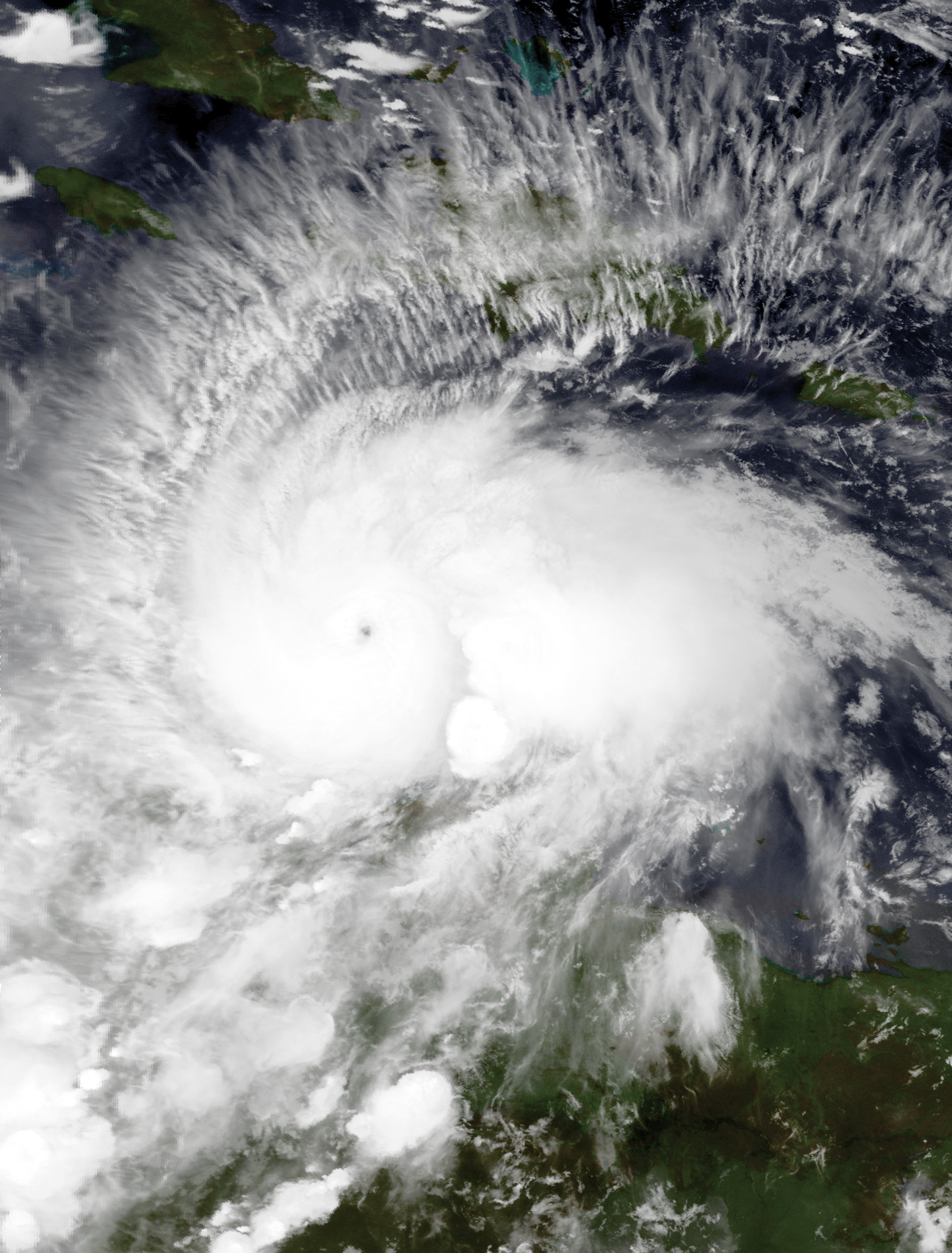
- Matthew at its initial peak intensity just north of Colombia early on October 1

Meteorological history
- Formed: September 28, 2016
- Extratropical: October 9, 2016
- Dissipated: October 10, 2016

Category 5 major hurricane
- 1-minute sustained (SSHWS/NWS)
- Highest winds: 165 mph (270 km/h)
- Lowest pressure: 934 mbar (hPa); 27.58 inHg

Overall effects
- Fatalities: 731 total
- Damage: $16.5 billion (2016 USD)
- Areas affected: Windward Islands, Leeward Antilles, Venezuela, Colombia, Greater Antilles, Lucayan Archipelago, Southeastern United States, Atlantic Canada
- IBTrACS
- Part of the 2016 Atlantic hurricane season
- History: Meteorological history; Effects: Florida; Haiti; Other wikis: Commons: Matthew images

Hurricane Matthew was a powerful and devastating tropical cyclone which caused catastrophic damage and a humanitarian crisis in Haiti, as well as widespread devastation across Cuba, the Bahamas, and the southeastern United States. The deadliest Atlantic hurricane since Hurricane Stan in 2005, and the first Category 5 Atlantic hurricane since Felix in 2007, Matthew was the thirteenth named storm, fifth hurricane and second major hurricane of the 2016 Atlantic hurricane season. It caused extensive damage to landmasses in the Greater Antilles, and severe damage in several islands of the Bahamas which were still recovering from Joaquin, which had pounded the archipelago nearly a year earlier. Matthew also approached the southeastern United States, but stayed just offshore, paralleling the Florida coastline.

Originating from a tropical wave that emerged off Africa on September 22, Matthew developed into a tropical storm just east of the Lesser Antilles on September 28. It became a hurricane north of Venezuela and Colombia on September 29, before undergoing explosive intensification, ultimately reaching Category 5 intensity on October 1 with peak 1-minute sustained winds of 165 mph. This strength was attained at just 13.4°N latitude – the lowest latitude ever recorded for a storm of this intensity in the Atlantic basin, breaking the record set by Hurricane Ivan in 2004. Matthew weakened slightly and fluctuated in intensity while making a northward turn toward the Greater Antilles, remaining a strong Category 4 hurricane as it made its first landfall over Haiti's Tiburon Peninsula early on October 4, and then a second one in Cuba later that day. Matthew weakened somewhat but re-intensified as it tracked northwest, making landfall in the northern Bahamas. The storm then paralleled the coast of the southeastern United States over the next 36 hours, gradually weakening while remaining just offshore before making its fourth and final landfall over the Cape Romain National Wildlife Refuge near McClellanville, South Carolina as a Category 1 hurricane on the morning of October 8. Matthew re-emerged into the Atlantic shortly afterward, eventually completing its transition into an extratropical cyclone as it turned away from Cape Hatteras, North Carolina on October 9. The remnants of Matthew continued to accelerate towards Canada where it was absorbed by a cold front.

Widespread effects were felt from Matthew across its destructive path, however, the most significant impacts were felt in Haiti, with US$2.8 billion in damage and 674 deaths, making Matthew the worst disaster to affect the nation since the 2010 earthquake. The combination of flooding and high winds disrupted telecommunications and destroyed extensive swaths of land; around 80% of Jérémie sustained significant damage. Four people were killed in Cuba due to a bridge collapse, and total losses in the country amounted to US$2.58 billion, most of which occurred in the Guantánamo Province. Passing through the Bahamas as a major hurricane, Matthew spread damage across several islands. Grand Bahama was hit directly, where most homes sustained damage in the townships of Eight Mile Rock and Holmes Rock. Preparations began in earnest across the southeastern United States as Matthew approached, with several states declaring states of emergencies for either entire states or coastal counties; widespread evacuations were ordered for extensive areas of the coast because of predicted high wind speeds and flooding, especially in the Jacksonville Metropolitan Area. In Florida, over 1 million lost power as the storm passed to the east, with 478,000 losing power in Georgia and South Carolina. While damage was primarily confined to the coast in Florida and Georgia, torrential rains spread inland in the Carolinas and Virginia, causing widespread flooding.

== Meteorological history ==
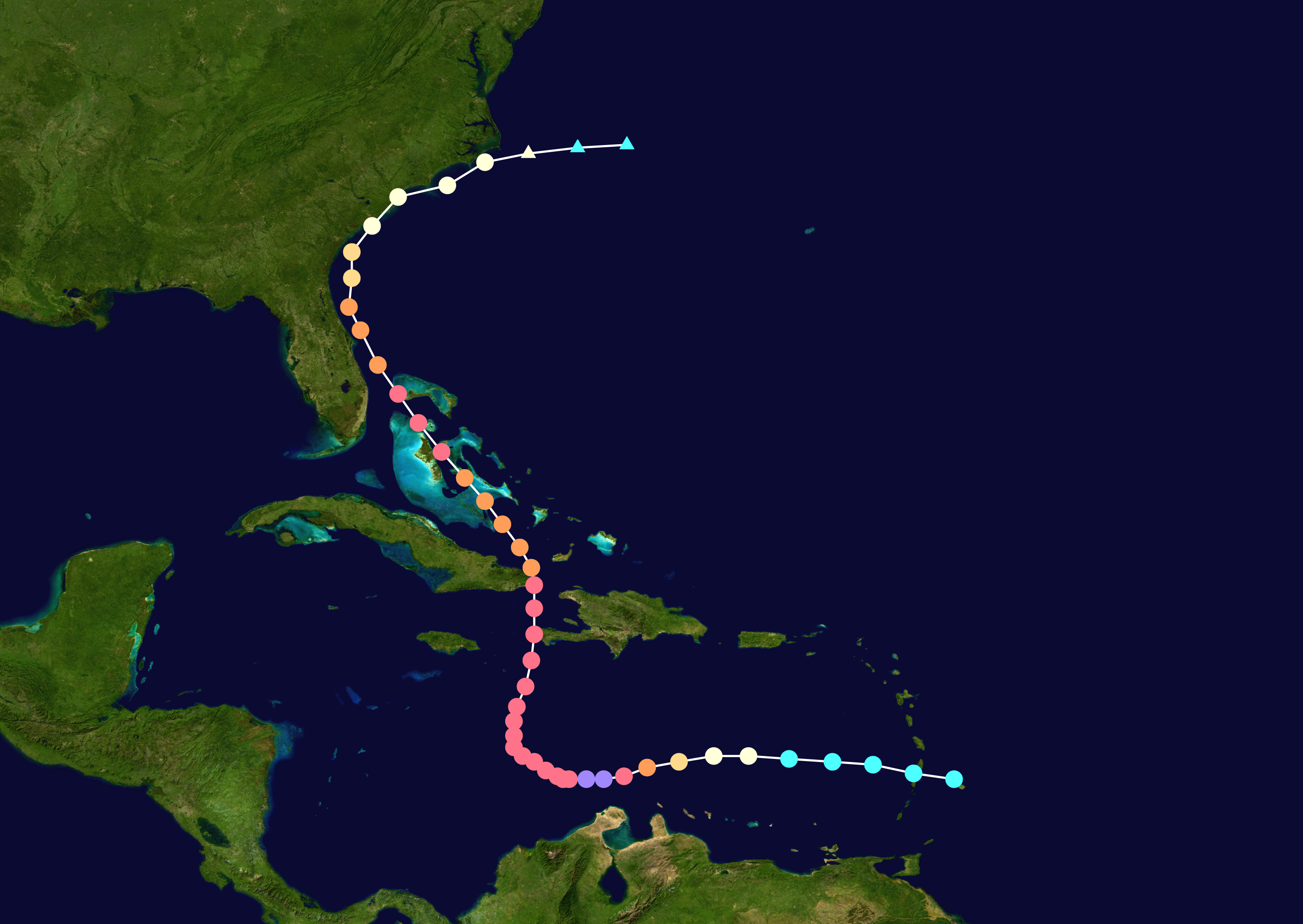
Map plotting the storm's track and intensity, according to the Saffir–Simpson scale Map key Saffir–Simpson scale Tropical depression (≤38 mph, ≤62 km/h) Tropical storm (39–73 mph, 63–118 km/h) Category 1 (74–95 mph, 119–153 km/h) Category 2 (96–110 mph, 154–177 km/h) Category 3 (111–129 mph, 178–208 km/h) Category 4 (130–156 mph, 209–251 km/h) Category 5 (≥157 mph, ≥252 km/h) Unknown Storm type Tropical cyclone Subtropical cyclone Extratropical cyclone, remnant low, tropical disturbance, or monsoon depression

A vigorous tropical wave moved off the coast of Africa on September 22 and moved rapidly across the Atlantic, being monitored by the National Hurricane Center (NHC) for possible tropical cyclogenesis. Despite possessing tropical-storm winds as it approached the Lesser Antilles on September 27, the wave could not initially be classified as a tropical cyclone, as reconnaissance aircraft could not find a closed center. However, by 12:00 UTC on September 28, the wave developed a closed circulation while located near Barbados, hence becoming a tropical storm, and was assigned the name Matthew. Continuing westward under the influence of a mid-level ridge, the storm steadily intensified to attain hurricane intensity by 18:00 UTC on September 29. The effects of southwesterly wind shear unexpectedly abated late that day, and Matthew began a period of explosive intensification; during a 24-hour period beginning at 00:00 UTC on September 30, the cyclone's maximum winds more than doubled, from 80 to 165 mph (129 to 266 km/h), making Matthew a Category 5 hurricane, the first since Felix in 2007; the rate of intensification has only been exceeded a few times in the Atlantic since records began. Due to upwelling of cooler waters, Matthew weakened to a Category 4 hurricane later on October 1, before attaining a secondary peak intensity with winds of 155 mph (249 km/h) late on October 2.

Slowly rounding the ridge, Matthew fluctuated in intensity within the Category 4 range from October 1–5. Intensification resumed again late on October 3 and culminated when Matthew made landfall near Les Anglais, Haiti, around 11:00 UTC on October 4 with winds of 150 mph (240 km/h) and a pressure of 934 millibars (27.6 inHg), making it the strongest to hit Haiti since Cleo in 1964. Continuing northward, the hurricane struck Maisí in Cuba early on October 5 as a slightly weaker storm. Cuba's and Haiti's mountainous terrain weakened Matthew to Category 3 status, as it began to accelerate northwestwards through the Bahamas. Restrengthening occurred as Matthew's circulation became better organized, with the storm becoming a Category 4 hurricane again while passing Freeport. However, Matthew began to weaken again as an eyewall replacement cycle took place. The storm significantly weakened while closely paralleling the coasts of Florida and Georgia, the western portion of the outer eyewall came ashore in Florida as a Category 3 hurricane, while the inner eyewall remained just offshore. Matthew weakened to a Category 2 hurricane late on October 7 and then to a Category 1 hurricane by 12:00 UTC on October 8.

Hurricane Matthew as observed by NASA aboard the International Space Station on October 3.

Around 15:00 UTC on October 8, the hurricane made landfall at Cape Romain National Wildlife Refuge, near McClellanville, South Carolina, with winds of 85 mph (137 km/h) and a central pressure of 963 mbar (28.4 inHg), which made it the strongest to strike the United States in terms of pressure since Irene in 2011, and the first hurricane to make landfall north of Florida in October since Hurricane Hazel in 1954. (Note: Although Hurricane Sandy was significantly deeper and made landfall much farther north in late October 2012, it was an extratropical cyclone at the time of landfall.) Convection became displaced from the center as Matthew pulled away from land due to increasing wind shear, with the NHC declaring the system an extratropical cyclone about 200 mi (320 km) east of Cape Hatteras, North Carolina, on October 9. The remnants persisted for another day, before they were absorbed by a cold front.

=== Records ===
Matthew set several records during its long and destructive journey. Matthew intensified into a Category 5 hurricane at a latitude of 13.4 degrees north, breaking the record set by Ivan in 2004, which had reached that intensity at a latitude of 13.7 degrees north. Matthew also maintained at least Category 4 status for the longest duration on record for the month of October, according to Phil Klotzbach of Colorado State University, doing so for roughly 5 days.

== Preparations ==
=== Windward Islands and South America ===
Water vapor loop of Matthew passing over the Windward Islands and entering the Caribbean Sea on September 28

On September 27, prior to Matthew becoming a tropical cyclone, LIAT began cancelling flights across the Windward Islands in anticipation of squally weather. Schools and businesses were closed for the duration of Matthew's passage on September 27 and 28 on Grenada, St. Vincent and St. Lucia; schools in Dominica suspended classes until October 3. Hewanorra International Airport and George F. L. Charles Airport on St. Lucia were closed on September 28. Six shelters were opened across the island; 133 sought refuge in them. Upon the formation of Matthew as a tropical cyclone on September 28, governments across the Windward Islands issued tropical storm warnings in anticipation of gale-force winds.

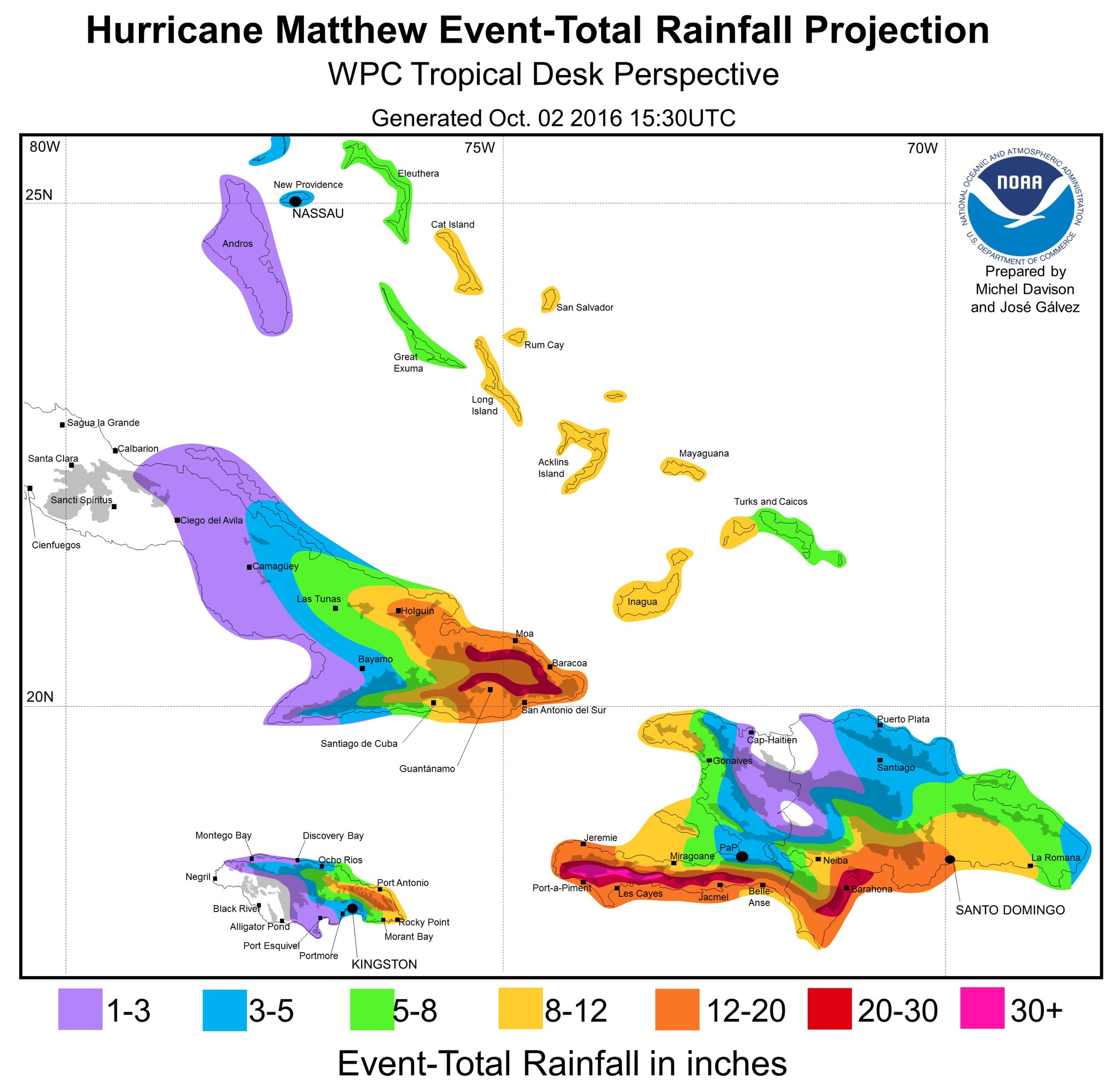
A map of forecast rainfall totals from Hurricane Matthew for the Greater Antilles and the Bahamas. Peak accumulations in excess of 30 in (760 mm) were expected along the southern coast of Haiti's Tiburon Peninsula.

The storm's unusual south track prompted the issuance of tropical storm watches on September 28 for Aruba, Bonaire, Curaçao, and the northern coast of Colombia from the Colombia–Venezuela border to Riohacha. North Atlantic hurricanes affecting South America are uncommon. The watch in Colombia was later upgraded to a warning on September 30 as Matthew continued on a west-southwest track near the country. Residents across the ABC Islands were advised to board their homes and stock up on supplies, leading to long lines at supermarkets and gas stations. Curaçao's government postponed the 2016 general election until October 5. Government offices in Aruba closed for September 30. A local sporting event, the Kingdom Tournament, was canceled in Aruba. Schools across the Guajira Peninsula of Colombia suspended activities for September 30. Officials opened shelters and closed beaches across the peninsula.

=== Jamaica ===
With Matthew posing a significant threat to Jamaica, emergency officials ordered all fishermen on the nation's cays and banks to evacuate to the mainland on September 29. The following day, Prime Minister Andrew Holness held an emergency meeting regarding the hurricane and placed the government on high alert. A hurricane watch was issued for the country on September 30, and later upgraded to a warning on October 1. Officials in Trelawny Parish placed 60 shelters on stand-by on October 2. Supermarkets were overwhelmed with residents stocking up on supplies, and many reported empty shelves and low supplies of bread, kerosene, and candles. Many people boarded up their homes and protected their property with sand bags. One hundred female prisoners were relocated from a facility in St. Catherine Parish to another in Kingston. Toll fees along Highway 2000 were to be waived during the hours before Matthew's arrival. Service at both Norman Manley International Airport and Sangster International Airport was scheduled to be suspended during the evening of October 2 or by the morning of October 3. The Jamaica Urban Transit Company scheduled to suspend services beginning at 6:00 p.m. local time. The Jamaica Public Service informed residents that the power grid might be shut off during the storm if conditions became severe. Members of the Jamaica Defence Force were deployed nationwide in advance of the hurricane in order to more swiftly deal with its aftermath.

Schools and government offices suspended operations starting on October 3. A total of 900 shelters opened across Jamaica and the Urban Transit Company provided buses to evacuate people from Kingston to the National Arena. Local Minister Desmond McKenzie warned that the infrastructure of Kingston would be unable to handle the magnitude of rainfall expected. Prime Minister Andrew Holness warned residents that Matthew could be more severe than Hurricane Gilbert which devastated the nation in 1988.

=== Haiti ===
The animation shows Hurricane Matthew from September 28 to October 2, and 3-dimensional radar data from GPM's DPR instrument.

Though forecast to pass over Jamaica at the time, the large extent of tropical storm-force winds prompted the issuance of a tropical storm watch for Haiti's Tiburon Peninsula toward the border with the Dominican Republic. Following an eastward shift in Matthew's predicted track, a hurricane watch was issued for much of Haiti on October 1, encompassing areas from Môle-Saint-Nicolas south to the Dominican Republic border; this was upgraded to a warning just hours later. The warning eventually encompassed the entire country by the afternoon of October 2. Residents on outlying islands of Haiti were evacuated to the mainland. Life-threatening rainfall was forecast to affect much of the nation, with accumulations averaging 15 to 25 in (38 to 64 cm) along the southern coast with isolated peaks up to 40 in (100 cm). Although government officials held meetings on storm preparation, Radio France Internationale reported that Haiti does not have the logistical capability to handle a large-scale disaster. Only 576 shelters, with a collective capacity of 90,000 people, were listed for all of southern Haiti. According to the International Organization for Migration, 55,107 internally displaced persons remained in camps or hosting sites without adequate protection from the hurricane.

Provisional President of Haiti Jocelerme Privert addressed the nation on October 2, urging those living along the coast and in poorly constructed homes to evacuate and comply with authorities. Despite pleas from officials, many residents refused to leave their homes. Schools were closed for October 3–4, though government offices remained open. Nationwide, a total of 1,300 shelters were readied with a total capacity of 390,000 people. More than 18,000 volunteers and members of the Red Cross, community intervention teams, municipal committees, and local emergency services were readied to assist residents. At least 500 people were evacuated from Jérémie. Although civil protection officials took to the streets to warn people, many residents were unaware that Matthew was even approaching the country a day before its expected landfall. Evacuations continued through the hurricane's landfall with the total number of people in shelters reaching 9,280 by 2:00 a.m. local time on October 4.

On October 5, the Electoral Provisional Council postponed the presidential election, the second round of the legislative elections and the first round of the Senate elections until November 20.

=== Dominican Republic ===
On the morning of October 2, a tropical storm warning was raised for the southern coast of the Dominican Republic from Barahona west to the Haitian border, and a tropical storm watch was issued for the northern coast from Puerto Plata west to the Haitian border. At least 8,500 people were evacuated in southwestern areas of the country by the morning of October 3.

=== Cuba and the Bahamas ===
Annotated animation of Hurricane Matthew moving through the Bahamas on October 5–6

The Meteorological Service of Cuba raised hurricane watches for all of southeastern Cuba on October 1, encompassing the provinces of Camagüey, Las Tunas, Granma, Holguín, Santiago de Cuba, and Guantánamo. This was subsequently upgraded to a warning on October 2 for all provinces except Camagüey. Non-essential personnel in the United States' Guantanamo Bay Naval Base began evacuations that day. Evacuations of more than 1 million people across Cuba started that morning, including 252,000 in Santiago de Cuba, and 230,000 from Las Tunas with priority placed on those along the coast. Across Santiago de Cuba, which suffered extensive damage from Hurricane Sandy in 2012, 218 shelters were opened and officials placed extra attention on Socapa, Caracoles, and Cayo Granma. Emergency personnel, primarily doctors, were dispatched to high-risk areas and supplies were stockpiled.

The Government of the Bahamas began issuing hurricane watches on October 2 for southeastern islands as well as the Turks and Caicos. Flights across southern islands were cancelled and schools suspended operations beginning the following day.

=== United States ===
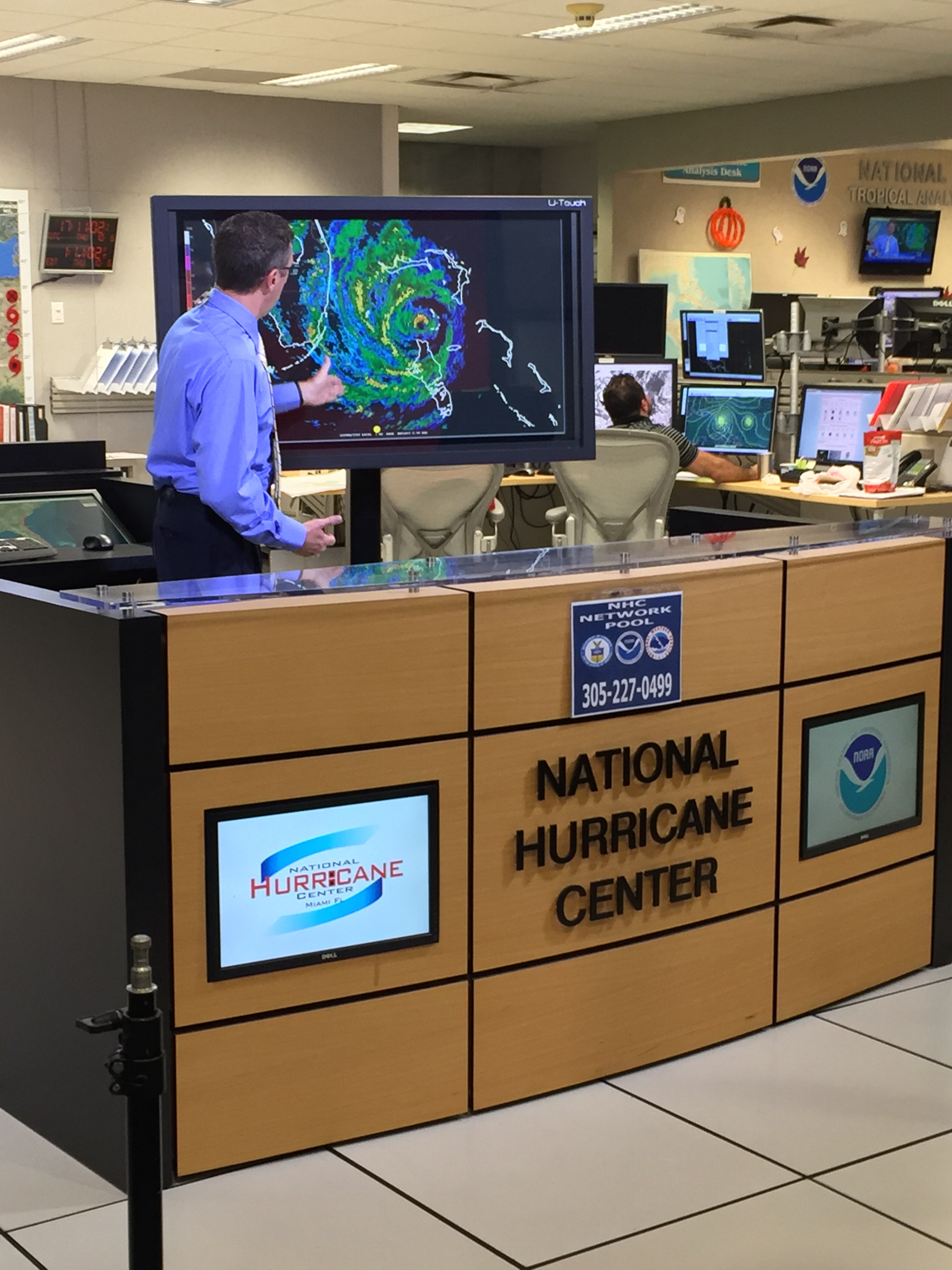
National Hurricane Center Director Richard Knabb (pictured) regularly filmed briefings on the forecast and expected impacts of Hurricane Matthew in the United States.

On October 3, the governors of Florida and North Carolina declared a state of emergency. The next day, South Carolina governor Nikki Haley ordered an evacuation for those residents living within one hundred miles (160 km) of the coast. Interstate 26 in South Carolina eastbound between the coast and Columbia was reversed on Wednesday to facilitate movement away from the Lowcountry and Charleston areas. Evacuations of Cape Lookout National Seashore in North Carolina began this day as well. By October 4, North Carolina Governor Pat McCrory had ordered that evacuation be mandatory. A state of emergency was also declared for 13 counties in eastern Georgia.

On October 5, Port Canaveral was closed by the U.S. Coast Guard, the first closure since 2004. Eight cruise ships and four cargo ships were scheduled to visit the port between October 5–9. On Cape Canaveral, home to both civilian and military spaceflight facilities, no rockets or spacecraft were in vulnerable positions; at the time of Matthew's approach, the next launch was scheduled for November 4. The Kennedy Space Center began preparations of the facilities on October 5. Older buildings at the KSC were designed to withstand winds of 105–125 mph (169–201 km/h); buildings constructed after 1992, when Category 5 Hurricane Andrew struck the Miami area, are built to withstand 130 mph (210 km/h) winds. At Cape Canaveral Air Force Station, the U.S. Air Force's 45th Space Wing began disconnecting electric power to non-essential facilities on October 4.

Enhanced infrared satellite loop of Matthew passing east of Florida on October 7

For the fourth time in its 45-year history, the Walt Disney World Resort closed. Its theme parks, Magic Kingdom, Epcot, Disney's Hollywood Studios and Disney's Animal Kingdom, as well as water parks Disney's Blizzard Beach, Disney's Typhoon Lagoon, and Disney Springs, were closed at 5:00 p.m. Eastern Daylight Time on October 6, and remained closed on October 7. This was the first time since 2004 that the parks have closed, all instances due to hurricanes. Other Orlando-area theme parks, including Universal Orlando resort and SeaWorld Orlando, also closed.

The Southeastern Conference football game between LSU and Florida, scheduled for October 8 in Gainesville, was cancelled, while the SEC football game between Georgia and South Carolina, scheduled for October 8 in Columbia, was moved to October 9. The hurricane washed out NASCAR racing at Charlotte Motor Speedway on October 7 and 8, with the Drive for the Cure 300 race in the Xfinity Series originally scheduled for October 7 and the Bank of America 500 race in the Sprint Cup Series originally scheduled for October 8 both postponed until October 9.

On October 6, U.S. President Barack Obama declared a federal state of emergency for Florida, later extending to include Georgia and South Carolina. Florida's governor Rick Scott urged over 1.5 million people to evacuate, with Hurricane Matthew expected to make landfall by the evening of that day. Several news anchors also issued dire warnings urging Floridians to evacuate.

That same day, Georgia governor Nathan Deal ordered a mandatory evacuation for all areas of the state east of Interstate 95, and the Georgia Department of Public Safety reversed the eastbound lanes on a portion of Interstate 16 effective until the following day.

==== Online response ====
On October 6, the conservative news aggregator Drudge Report—run by Matt Drudge—headlined a five-word comment on Matthew: "Storm Fizzle? Matthew Looks Ragged!" which linked to a Miami Herald article. Drudge later used Twitter to claim that the National Hurricane Center was lying to the public about the intensity of the storm, stating that measurements from Nassau, Bahamas, did not match the 165 mph (266 km/h) gusts listed in public advisories. The tweets implied that the hurricane was not as dangerous as it seemed and that politicians were trying to "blame mankind," referring to a blog posting about Hillary Clinton. This came on the heels of radio talk show host Rush Limbaugh's claims of the conspiracy to "sell" climate change. The claims of conspiracy were posted as Matthew posed a dire threat to Florida's east coast and when residents across the state were being urged to evacuate immediately. Drudge's commentary was quickly met with sharp condemnation and criticism from meteorologists and public officials. Democratic Representative Keith Ellison called the comments "irresponsible" and urged people to "not listen to this man." Jason Samenow of The Washington Post described it as an "incredible and offensive accusation", and stated that it "may have introduced enough doubt to lead [residents] into a decision they will regret."

== Impact ==
Deaths and damage by country
Country	Fatalities			Damage (2016 USD)	Ref(s)
Country	Total	Direct	Indirect	Damage (2016 USD)	Ref(s)
The Bahamas	0	0	0	$580 million	
Canada	0	0	0	$74 million	
Colombia	1	1	0	—N/a	
Cuba	4	0	4	$2.58 billion	
Dominican Republic	4	4	0	$434 million	
Haiti	674	674	0	$2.8 billion	
Saint Vincent and the Grenadines	1	1	0	—N/a	
United States	47	34	13	$10 billion	
Totals:	731	714	17	$16.5 billion	

=== Windward Islands ===
On St. Vincent, heavy rains caused landslides and flooding across the island. One person was killed in the town of Layou when a boulder broke loose. In nearby Buccament Bay, a river overtopped its banks, prompting at least 25 people to evacuate to emergency shelters. The Hermitage River rose by at least 3.6 ft (1.1 m) in one hour, and as a precautionary measure, the Central Water and Sewage Authority shut off all water service. Flooding also took place in Vermont, South Rivers, sections of Kingstown, Campden Park, Arnos Vale, and Langley Park. Debris deposited by flooded rivers rendered many roads impassable.

Strong winds in excess of 60 mph (97 km/h) downed many trees and power lines on St. Lucia, leaving roughly 70 percent of the island without power. Landslides and flooding, the result of more than 10 in (250 mm) of rain accompanying the storm, damaged many homes and roads. Rainfall at Hewanorra International Airport amounted to 13.19 in (335 mm). The nation's banana crop suffered significant damage; 85 percent of farms reported losses. Two homes were destroyed, one in Bisee, and one in Gros Islet; several others were damaged. Roads in Castries, Gros-Islet, Dennery, and Soufriere became impassible from debris or landslides. Some damage was also reported on Dominica, temporarily leaving many people without water and electricity. Heavy rainfall in Grenada disrupted the water supply in multiple communities.

In Martinique strong winds, which gusted up to 89 mph (143 km/h) in Saint-Pierre, wreaked havoc on the power grid; roughly 55,000 people lost electricity. Numerous trees downed by the winds blocked roadways while heavy rains led to flooding. The main road from Fort-de-France to southern towns was rendered impassable during the storm. Approximately 4,000 people lost their water supply. Three people sustained minor injuries.

=== ABC islands and South America ===
The effects of Matthew across the ABC islands were relatively limited despite its proximity. Some street flooding occurred on Aruba and Curaçao. Heavy winds were also experienced. There was some damage to cars after street flooding occurred. Outdoor bars and restaurants were damaged. The Guajira Peninsula of Colombia saw its first heavy rain event in three years, leading to widespread flash flooding. One person drowned in a swollen river in Uribia; 1.29 in (32.8 mm) of rain fell in 30 minutes in the town. Rainfall in Cartagena reached 8.7 in (222 mm) during a 24-hour span and Santa Marta saw 5.5 in (140 mm). Along coastal areas of the peninsula, large swells damaged buildings, prompting the evacuation of 380 people in Manaure. Roughly 70 percent of Tucurinca flooded when the Magdalena River overtopped its banks; a nearby bridge collapsed, isolating some communities. Approximately 73,000 people were affected by the floods. The dangerous conditions produced by Matthew prevented thousands of people from voting in a peace agreement referendum.

=== Jamaica ===
Jamaica suffered relatively minor effects, characteristic of tropical storm conditions. Along the coast, rip currents and beach erosion was reported, with additional flooding due to rainfall occurring. Strong wind gusts tore at the island's vegetation, causing minor damage.

=== Haiti ===
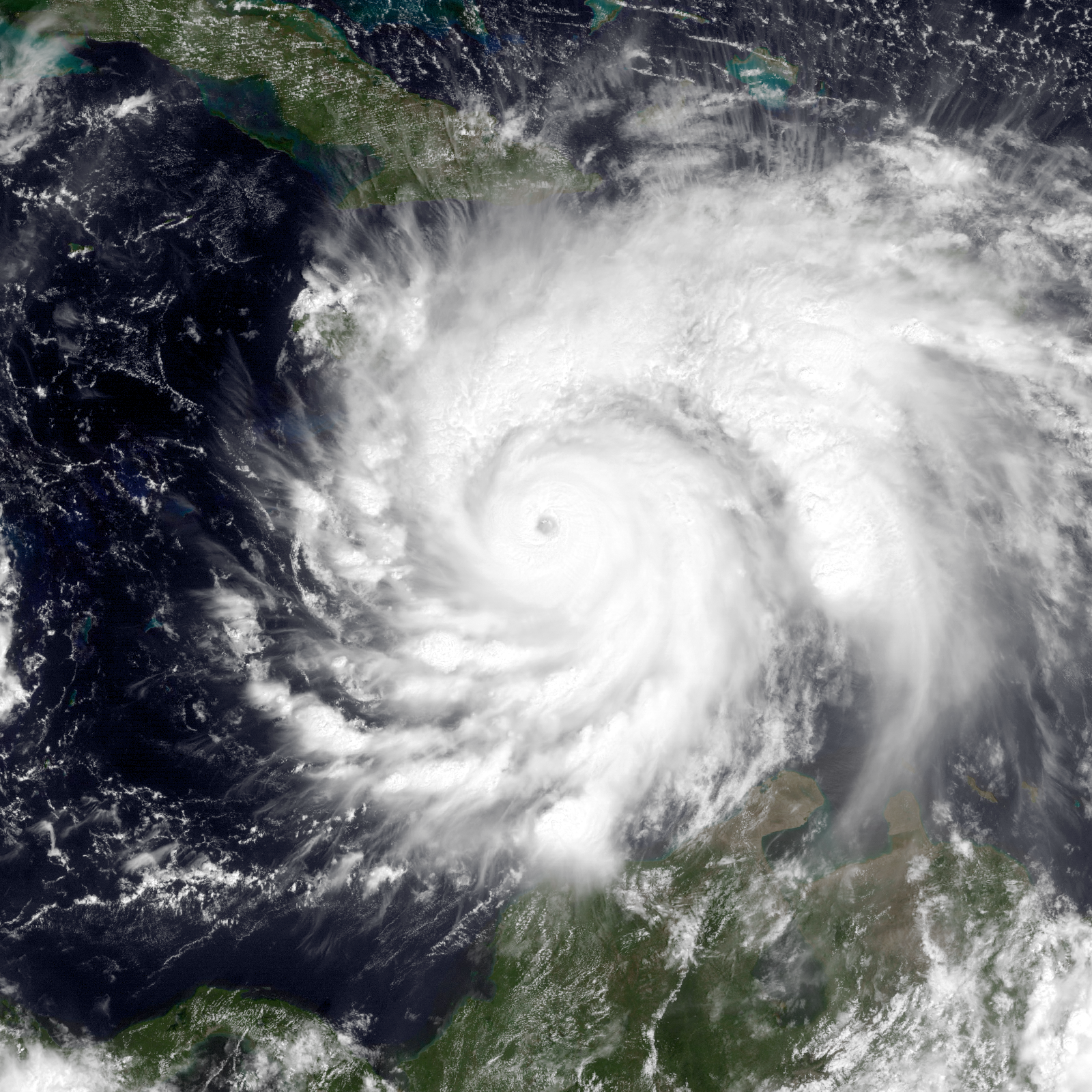
Hurricane Matthew approaching Jamaica, Haiti, and Cuba on October 3

Matthew making landfall in Haiti

Large swells reached the outlying Haitian island of Île-à-Vache on October 2, prompting the evacuation of 89 people. Despite boating bans, many fishermen continued work in rough conditions. Consequently, two fishermen went missing on the morning of October 3: one near Saint-Jean-du-Sud and the other near Aquin; one was later found dead. Antecedent rainfall associated with the outer bands of Matthew triggered flooding in several towns in southern Haiti and the Dominican Republic. A person was killed when a tree fell on his home in Port-Salut, while a 26-year-old man drowned while trying to rescue a child from a rushing river.

Striking the Tiburon Peninsula as a Category 4 hurricane on the morning of October 4, Matthew was the strongest storm to directly impact Haiti since Hurricane Cleo in 1964. An anemometer at Antoine-Simon Airport in Les Cayes, east of where Matthew made landfall, measured a gust of 107 mph (172 km/h) before the station went offline. Gusts in the nation's capital city of Port-au-Prince reached 60 mph (97 km/h). Communications with areas in the direct path of Matthew were lost, and tens of thousands of people became isolated as roads and bridges were destroyed. A major bridge connecting parts of Grand'Anse to the rest of the country collapsed during a flash flood. 80% of Jérémie, along the north shore of the Tiburon Peninsula, suffered tremendous damage; homes were flattened and medical facilities suffered major damage. A radio host in Port-au-Prince stated that Jérémie was "pretty much wiped out from the seaboard all the way to the cathedral".

Officially, 546 deaths were attributed to the storm in Haiti, however local governments believed the death toll to be over 1,000; this value may have been overestimated. According to the nation's Civil Protection Directorate, the death toll was 546 as of October 14, with 128 people missing and 439 injured. The government initially estimated damages at around 124 billion gourdes (US$1.9 billion), but later research found that the actual damages were up to $2.8 billion. Approximately 2.1 million people were affected by the storm, of whom 1.4 million (12 percent of Haiti's population) were left in need of assistance. Furthermore, roughly 175,000 people were left homeless.

=== Dominican Republic ===
The Dominican Republic reported significant rainfall and coastal flooding due to Matthew. An automated weather station in Cabo Rojo measured 8.43 in (214 mm) of rain by the afternoon of October 3. Four people died after a house collapsed on top of them. Damage of the flooding were about RD$20 billion (US$434 million).

=== Cuba ===
Costliest Cuban hurricanes
Rank	Hurricane	Season	Damage	Refs.
1	Irma	2017	$13.2 billion	
2	Ike	2008	$7.3 billion	
3	Matthew	2016	$2.58 billion	
4	Gustav	2008	$2.1 billion	
5	Michelle	2001	$2 billion	
5	Sandy	2012	$2 billion	
7	Dennis	2005	$1.5 billion	
8	Ivan	2004	$1.2 billion	
9	Rafael	2024	$1.08 billion	
10	Charley	2004	$923 million	

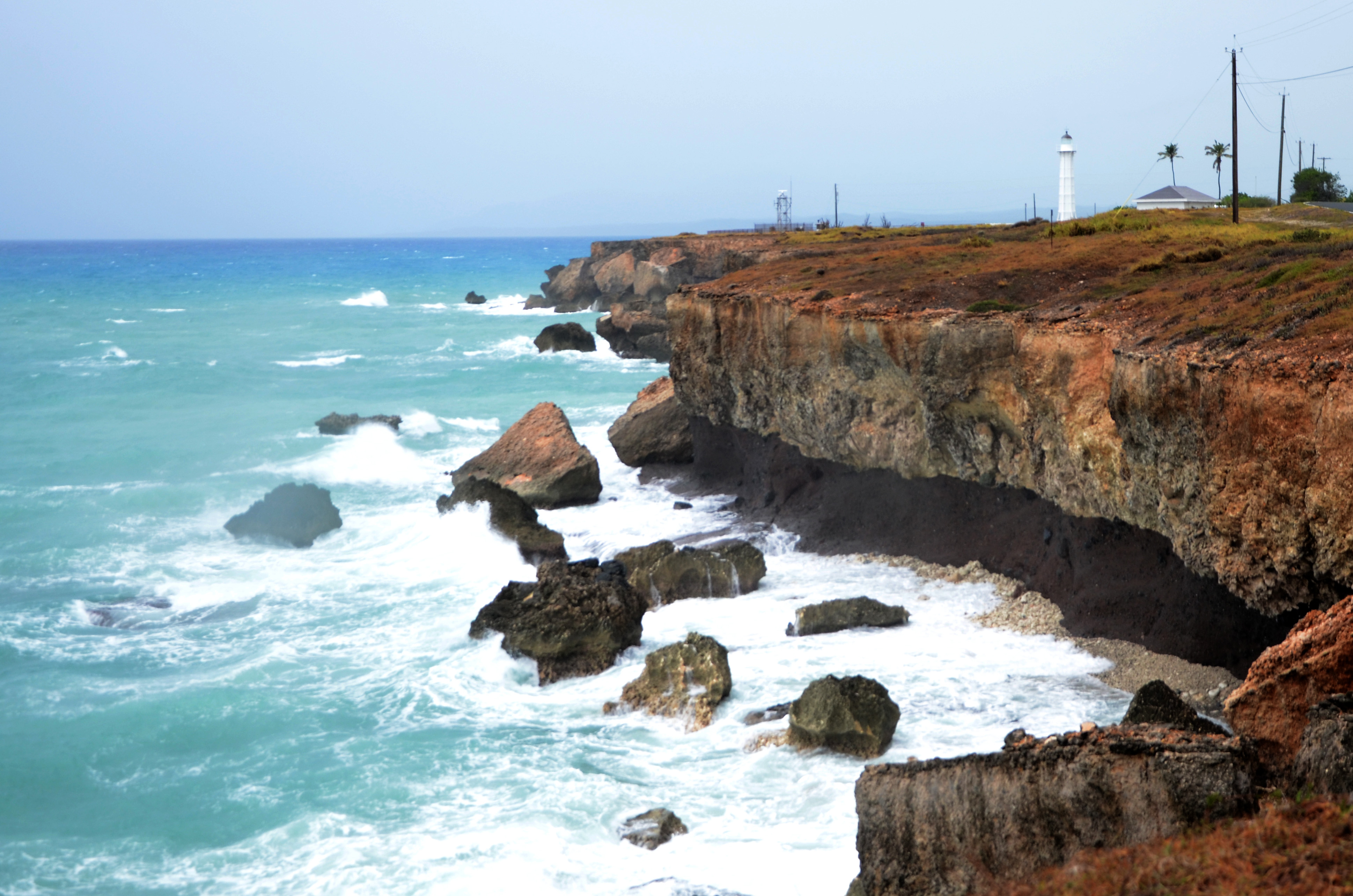
View of cliff erosion a day after Hurricane Matthew hit Naval Station Guantanamo Bay

Coastal flooding began in Granma Province, Cuba, on October 2, affecting three towns along the Sierra Maestras. Hurricane Matthew struck the easternmost province of Cuba during the evening of October 4 as a Category 4, causing tremendous damage. The coastal city of Baracoa suffered widespread damage from violent winds, and storm surge, the latter of which gutted countless buildings. Despite the severity of damage, no fatalities were reported in the city. A communication tower in Majayara collapsed during the storm and a bridge spanning the Toa river was destroyed; several communities left isolated as a result. Damages in Cuba amounted to US$2.58 billion; most of which occurred in the Guantánamo Province.

Nearly two months later, on November 22, a municipal bridge in the city of Moa that was damaged by Hurricane Matthew collapsed, killing four employees of Canadian mining company Sherritt International. The employees were undertaking repairs to restore access between Moa and a mining site.

=== Bahamas ===
Experiencing a direct hit from the eyewall of Matthew, Grand Bahama suffered extensive damage. An estimated 95 percent of homes in Eight Mile Rock and Holmes Rock sustained severe damage. Numerous trees and power lines were toppled by the storm's high winds, rendering roads impassable. Flooding-induced by the backside of the storm affected much of the western half of the island. Total losses from Matthew in the Bahamas are estimated to be around $580 million.

=== United States ===
Deaths and damage by U.S. state
State	Deaths	Damage	Ref
Florida	12	$2.77 billion	
Georgia	3	$90 million	
North Carolina	26	$1.6 billion	
South Carolina	4	$249.6 million	
Virginia	2	$58.14 million	

In total, the storm killed 47 people in the US, including 26 in North Carolina, 12 in Florida, 3 in Georgia, 4 in South Carolina, and 2 in Virginia. According to the National Centers for Environmental Information, damage from Matthew across the United States reached approximately $10 billion. This ranked it the costliest national disaster in the country for 2016 alongside record floods in Louisiana.

==== Florida and Georgia ====
As Hurricane Matthew traveled rapidly towards the southeastern region of the United States, it hit closely to the coasts of Florida, South Carolina, Georgia, and North Carolina. On October 7 in Fernandina Beach, Florida, there was a peak surge of 9.88 ft (3.01 m) above normal. Additionally, in the St. Augustine area, water was reported to be 2.5 ft (0.76 m) above ground.

As Matthew tracked parallel to the Florida coast, it left over one million people without power across the state of Florida. In Jacksonville it caused major sand dune damage and flooding in the St. Johns River. It also destroyed many properties and knocked out power for nearly 250,000 electrical customers. In Indialantic, Florida, firefighters exposed themselves to the storm's winds to put out a fire, which reportedly destroyed a greenhouse. In Florida, one woman died due to a heart attack; she had called for aid, but medical services were not able to arrive due to Matthew's high winds. Another two women were killed by falling trees. In the Flagler Beach area, a portion of Florida State Road A1A was washed away. At Kennedy Space Center, winds reached 80 mph (130 km/h) at ground level while a gust of 136 mph (219 km/h) was observed atop a 500 ft (150 m) tower. The facility suffered several million dollars' worth of damage, though overall impacts were less than anticipated. The roof of Operations Support Building II broke, and rainwater damaged the interior. Air conditioning was lost throughout Launch Complex 39 as well. The planned launches of GOES-R, NOAA's next generation weather satellite, and CYGNSS, a cluster of smaller satellites which study hurricanes, were delayed due to the suspension of operations during Matthew.

Over 250,000 customers were left without power in Georgia after Hurricane Matthew affected the area. Roads were also blocked in the Brunswick, Georgia, area, where all access points to St. Simons Island were rendered impassable.

==== North and South Carolina ====
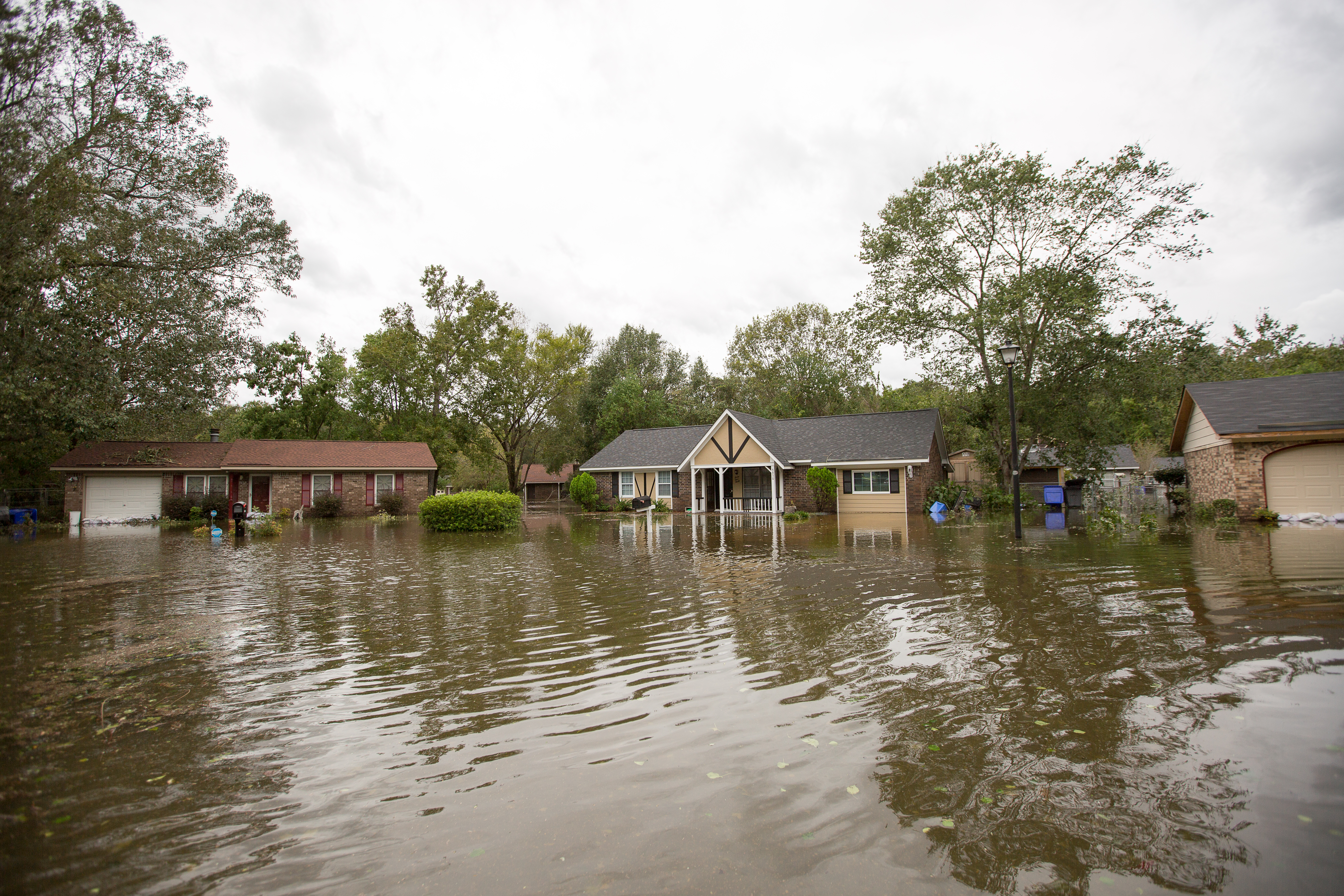
Flooding in Charleston, South Carolina on October 8.

Across South Carolina, at least 600,000 individuals lost power, where significant flooding was reported to have occurred in Charleston after a seawall was breached. Hilton Head Island experienced widespread water, sewer and power outages for several days, and the only road onto the island was not re-opened to residents until October 11. It is estimated that over 120,000 trees were downed on the island, causing extensive tree-strike damage to residences and businesses. Over 2.1 million cubic yards of vegetative debris generated by the storm was collected. The Waccamaw River crested in Conway at 17.9 ft (5.5 m), breaking a record set by the 1928 Okeechobee hurricane. The Little Pee Dee River reached a record crest of 17.1 ft (5.2 m) at Galivant's Ferry, also breaking a 1928 record.

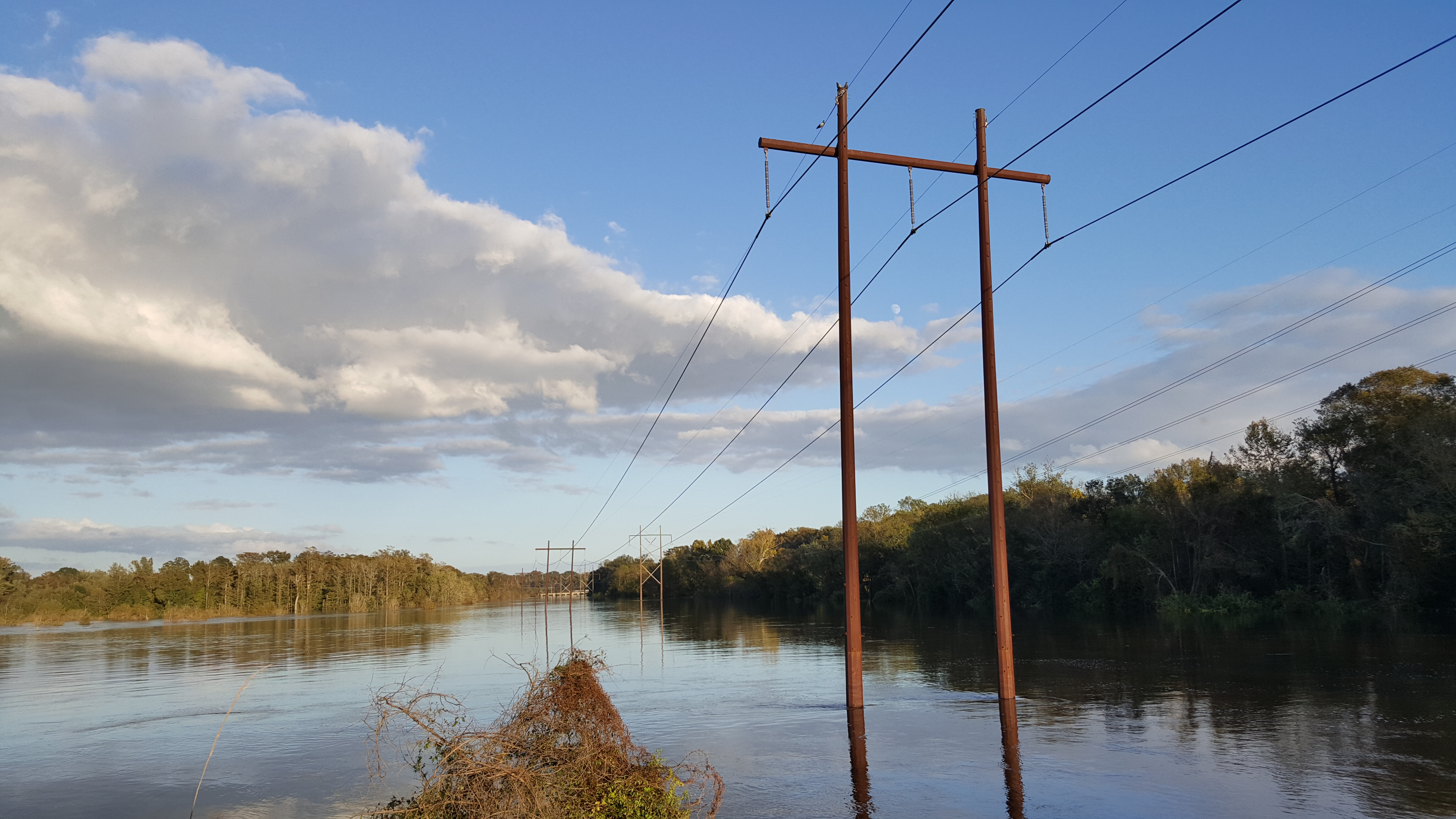
The Tar River overflowing its banks near Pitt–Greenville Airport on October 12; it later crested at 24.5 feet (7.5 m).

Twenty-six people died in storm-related incidents across North Carolina. 680,000 in North Carolina were without power at one point. Sections of Interstate 95 in South Carolina and in North Carolina had to be shut down as a result of hurricane flooding. The North Carolina section reopened October 17. After 10 in (25 cm) of rain fell in Cumberland, Harnett, Hoke, Moore and Robeson Counties on September 28 causing flooding, Matthew dumped another 10 to 14 in (25 to 36 cm). As a result, the Lumber River reached a record 24 ft (7.3 m) in the south end of Lumberton, breaking the record of 20.5 ft (6.2 m) feet. Robeson County schools did not reopen until October 31. In Smithfield, the Neuse River crested at 29.09 ft (8.87 m), 2 ft (0.61 m) higher than after Hurricane Fran. In Kinston, the Neuse crested at 28.31 ft (8.63 m), a foot (300 mm) higher than the record set by Hurricane Floyd. In Greenville, the Tar River crested at 24.5 ft (7.5 m). Preliminary estimates indicate that roughly 100,000 structures were flooded across the state and damage reached US$4.8 billion.

==== Virginia and the Northeast ====
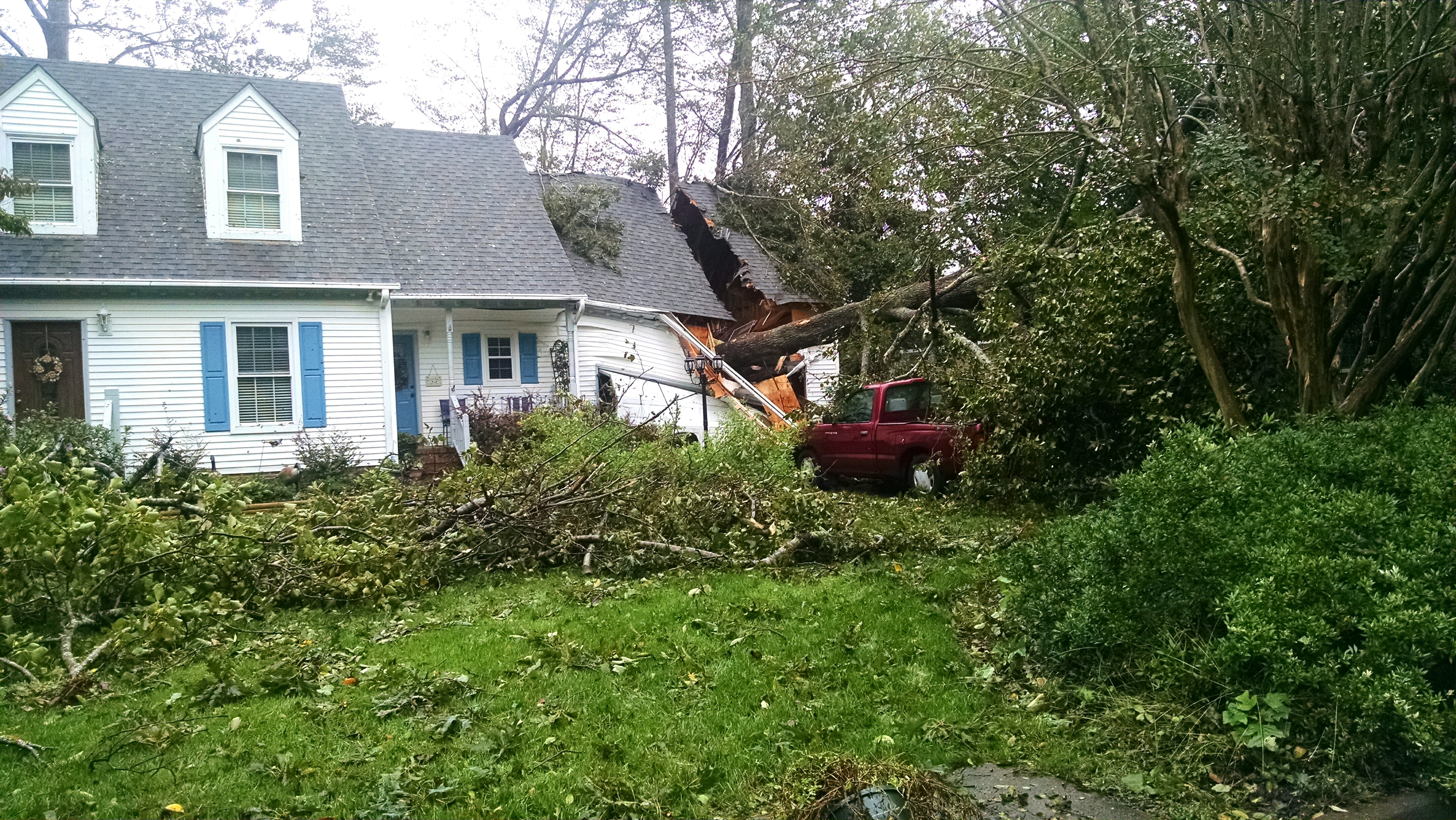
Heavy rains and high winds resulted in trees falling and record flooding in Lago Mar, Virginia Beach, Virginia.

When the hurricane hit Virginia, Matthew caused two deaths. Heavy wind gusts of up to 68 mph and more than 11 inches of rain led to hundreds of downed trees and severe street flooding in southern Virginia Beach. The Northeast received heavy rain and minor flooding throughout the days of October 9 and 10. Game 2 of the 2016 National League Division Series between the Washington Nationals and Los Angeles Dodgers was postponed due to rain from the hurricane.

=== Canada ===
Satellite image loop from October 6, when Matthew was a hurricane, to October 11, when it had joined a mid-latitude storm sweeping across eastern Canada.

Matthew's post-tropical remains were absorbed into a frontal zone off the coast of North Carolina. The humidity of the tropical system was drawn into the storm that was formed then. The latter gave heavy rain and strong winds in Nova Scotia, Prince Edward Island and Newfoundland from October 10 to 11.

In Nova Scotia, rain amounts were recorded from east to west as 8.85 in (224.8 mm) in Sydney (Cape Breton Island), 5.09 in (129.2 mm) in Port Hawkesbury, 4.50 in (114.4 mm) in Chéticamp, 4.05 in (102.8 mm) in Halifax, 3.263 in (82.88 mm) in Kentville, and 1.94 in (49.2 mm) in Yarmouth. Heavy rains and strong winds caused flooding and dangerous conditions, particularly in the counties of Pictou, Antigonish, Guysborough and Cape Breton. Several roads were closed to heavy trucks, including Halifax Harbour bridges and the Confederation Bridge between New Brunswick and Prince Edward Island.

Newfoundland was even more affected with accumulations generally ranging from 3.9 to 5.9 in (100 to 150 mm) in the central, southern and western areas. Steady rain fell sometimes at a rate of 0.39 to 0.79 in (10 to 20 mm) per hour, and even 1.7 in (42 mm) per hour in Burgeo. A private station in that community recorded a total of 9.23 in (234.4 mm), while the official station of the Gander International Airport signaled 6.45 in (163.8 mm).

The rain caused numerous landslides and swollen rivers cut roads. The state of emergency was declared in Lewisporte, St. Alban's and Little Burnt Bay. The town of St. Alban's, a community of about 1,200, was cut off from the surrounding communities when the main bridge in town was carried by the waters and a nearby community (Conne River) provided a boat to transport people to St. Alban's and out of the community. The highway to Burgeo, on the south coast of Newfoundland, was also flooded and had to be closed.

The winds of over 56 mph (90 km/h) also caused many fallen trees and electric power outages. The official maximum winds were recorded in Port aux Basques at 80 mph (128 km/h) and informally in Green Island, Fortune Bay, at 81 mph (130 km/h). Insurance loss across Atlantic Canada were in excess of C$100 million (US$74 million).

== Aftermath ==
=== Lesser Antilles ===
In Martinique, Électricité de France requested additional crews from Guadeloupe and French Guiana to help restore power. Members of the military and Forces françaises aux Antilles were deployed to assist in clearing debris from roadways. The St. Lucia Red Cross distributed non-food items to 270 people affected by the storm.

=== Haiti ===
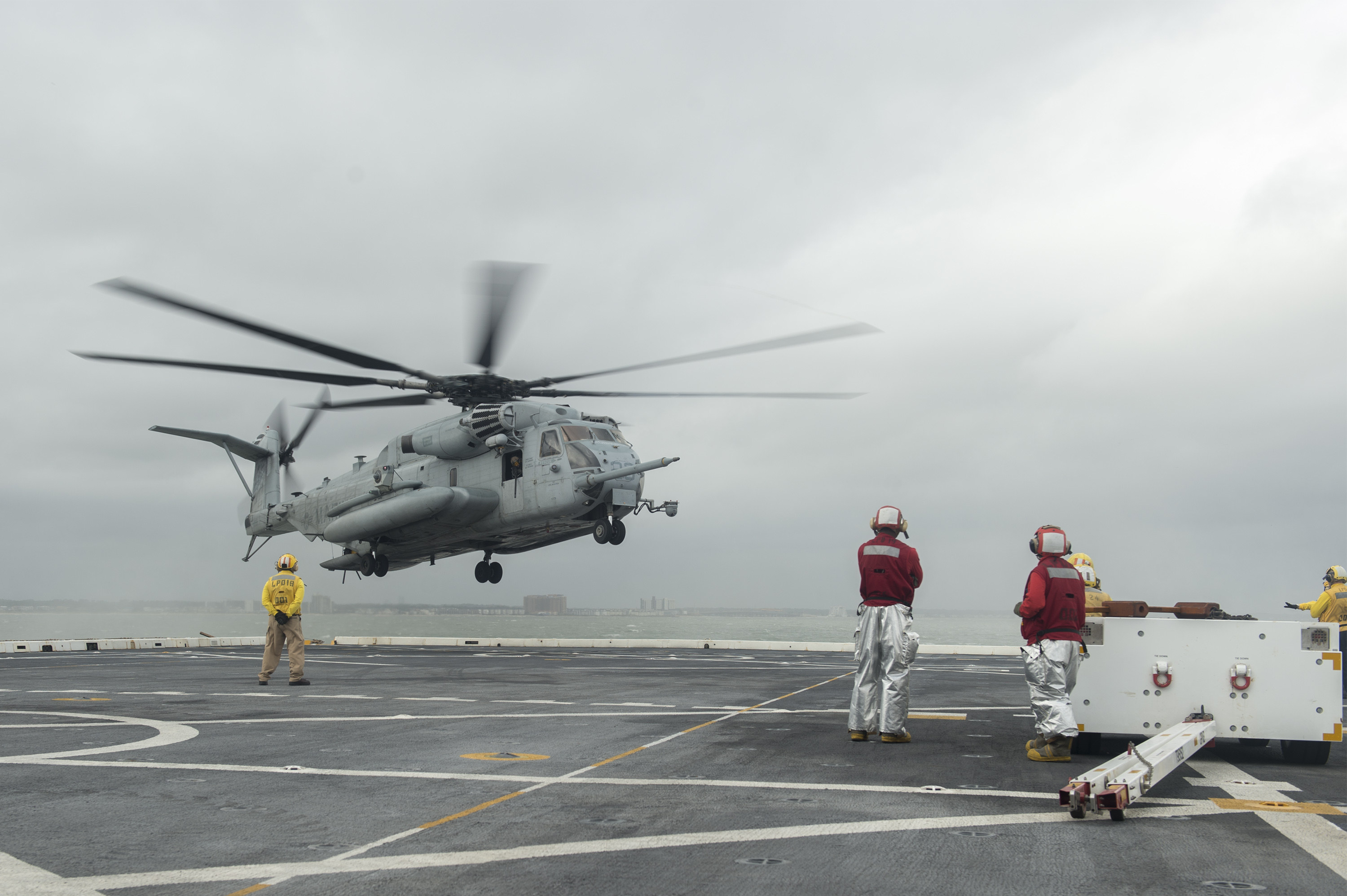
A CH-53E Sea Stallion helicopter assigned to the 24th Marine Expeditionary Unit, lands on the flight deck of the amphibious transport dock ship USS Mesa Verde. It is underway in preparation to support humanitarian assistance and disaster relief efforts in Haiti in response to Hurricane Matthew

On October 4, the United States prepared the aircraft carrier, the hospital ship USNS Comfort—which previously aided thousands in the wake of the 2010 Haiti earthquake—and the transport dock for relief operations in Haiti. USS Mesa Verde and USS George Washington were later relieved by USS Iwo Jima, along with the 24th Marine Expeditionary Unit. United States Southern Command also deployed 100 troops with 9 helicopters to the Cayman Islands to prepare for relief work. Initial estimates indicated at least 350,000 people were in need of assistance.

The bridge between the south and Port-au-Prince was destroyed. As a result, aid agencies reported they were having difficulty getting around to the most damaged and storm-affected parts of Haiti.

The commander of U.S. forces in the Caribbean reported that troops and 6 helicopters from Joint Task Force-Bravo had been deployed to Haiti for the aftermath, and were expected to arrive on October 6. These are expected to help with search-and-rescue missions as well as providing medical assistance. In addition to his, a one-star navy admiral will also travel to lead the task force involved in the operations. More than 300 military personnel will most likely travel to Haiti, with 300 Marines on board on the ships sent out for aid from the U.S.

A number of aid agencies deployed to Haiti to help with the aftermath:

- Action Aid reported that over 50,000 people were in immediate need of clean water and shelters.
- World Nation also sent out helicopters, reporting difficulties and their concern about young children and food. They will be providing water and sanitation for over 50,000 people.
- The UN's World Food Program arranged for enough food to feed up to 300,000 people for a month. A further 34 tonnes are ready in Miami to be used if needed.
- UNICEF will be providing life-saving aid for 10,000 people.
- UN's Food and Agricultural Organisation said it would be helping farmers rebuild their businesses by providing seeds.
- The US Agency for International Development said it would provide $400,000 for aid to Jamaica and Haiti on October 3.
- Red Cross launched a campaign to raise $9.6 million to provide water, shelter, and food for 50,000 people. They also sent a large number of local volunteers to the south.
- Direct Relief delivered a large emergency medical aid airlift to Haiti. The organization used a 757 plane, donated by FedEx, that contained 16.7 tons of medicine and medical supplies.

=== Cuba ===
The World Food Programme coordinated with the Government of Cuba to provide food to approximately 180,000 people in need across eastern provinces. The operation would span six months and cost US$4 million.

=== Dominican Republic ===
The EU Caribbean Investment Facility and a €50 million loan from the European Investment Bank will finance the reconstruction of housing, but also other essential infrastructure lost including roads, bridges and urban infrastructure. Climate resilience will be improve through infrastructure being built to higher standards and through flood prevention and better use of land. Around 1,000 new houses will be built for between 4,000 and 5,000 people with priority given to more economically vulnerable people.

=== United States ===
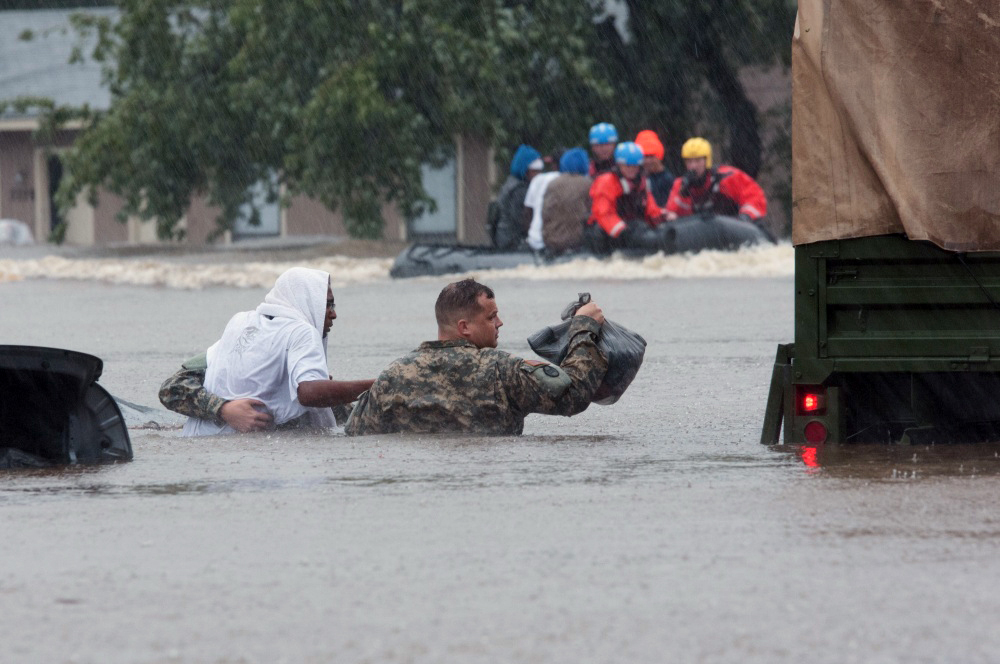
North Carolina National Guard assisting with high-water rescues in Fayetteville, North Carolina

In Georgia, the Governor retracted previous evacuations later, emphasizing that their lives could not be endangered for those who chose not to leave. 1,000 members of the National Guard were deployed for help later.

In North Carolina, nearly 900 people had been rescued by boat crews by the morning of October 9. In April 2017, North Carolina Governor Roy Cooper requested $929 million in federal funds. The following month, the Trump administration denied more than 99 percent of this request and only provided $6.1 million to the state.

=== Retirement ===
Because of the extensive damage and loss of life the storm caused in multiple countries along its track, the name Matthew was retired in March 2017 by the World Meteorological Organization, and will never again be used to name an Atlantic tropical cyclone. It was replaced with Martin for the 2022 Atlantic hurricane season.

== See also ==
- List of Cuba hurricanes
- List of Florida hurricanes (2000–present)
- List of North Carolina hurricanes (2000–present)
- List of South Carolina hurricanes
- Hurricane Hazel (1954) – Took a similar track through the Caribbean, and struck North Carolina as a Category 4 hurricane.
- Hurricane David (1979) – Made landfall in the Dominican Republic as a Category 5 hurricane before skirting the eastern coast of Florida.
- Hurricane Tomas (2010) – Traced a slightly similar path in the Caribbean, but stayed out to sea rather than curving towards the United States after impacting Hispaniola.
- Hurricane Joaquin (2015) – Stalled in the Central Bahamas roughly a year before Matthew.
- Hurricane Dorian (2019) – Struck the northeastern Caribbean, devastated the northern Bahamas, and took a similar track up the southeastern United States.
