= Morrisville, Newfoundland and Labrador =

Town in Newfoundland and Labrador, Canada

Morrisville
- Town
- Interactive map of Morrisville
- Coordinates: 47°52′58″N 55°46′02″W
- Country: Canada
- Province: Newfoundland and Labrador

Population (2021)
  - Total: 93
- Time zone: UTC-3:30 (Newfoundland Time)
  - Summer (DST): UTC-2:30 (Newfoundland Daylight)
- Area code: 709
- Highways: Route 361

Morrisville is a town in the Canadian province of Newfoundland and Labrador. It is located in the Bay d'Espoir, 169 km (105 mi) from Grand Falls-Windsor. As of the 2021 census, it had a population of 93.

In October 2016, the town, along with a few others in Atlantic Canada, was devastated from flooding related to Hurricane Matthew.

== Demographics ==
In the 2021 census conducted by Statistics Canada, Morrisville had a population of 93 living in 43 of its 46 total private dwellings, a change of −7.9% from its 2016 population of 101. With a land area of 14.09 km^{2} (5.44 sq mi), it had a population density of 6.6/km^{2} (17.1/sq mi) in 2021.

== See also ==
- Bay d'Espoir Hydroelectric Power Station
- Connaigre Peninsula
- List of cities and towns in Newfoundland and Labrador
