= Grole, Newfoundland and Labrador =

Settlement in Newfoundland and Labrador

Coordinates: 47.522°N 55.802°W

Location of Grole in Newfoundland and Labrador

Grole is a vacated settlement in the Canadian province of Newfoundland and Labrador. It is located 15km from the town of Hermitage and approximately 50km from Saint Pierre and Miquelon.
