= Milltown-Head of Bay d'Espoir =

- Town
- Interactive map of Milltown-Head of Bay d'Espoir
- Coordinates: 47°55′33″N 55°44′39″W
- Country: Canada
- Province: Newfoundland and Labrador

Population (2021)
  - Total: 669
- Time zone: UTC-3:30 (Newfoundland Time)
  - Summer (DST): UTC-2:30 (Newfoundland Daylight)
- Area code: 709
- Highways: Route 361

Milltown-Head of Bay d'Espoir is a town in the Canadian province of Newfoundland and Labrador. The town had a population of 669 in the Canada 2021 Census.

In January 2017, Bay d'Espoir Academy, along with the local RCMP detachment and Milltown Town Hall/Fire Department, was set ablaze in an act of arson. The original school was located in Milltown. A new school was built on a parcel of land in St. Alban's with construction completed in October 2021.

== Demographics ==
In the 2021 Census of Population conducted by Statistics Canada, Milltown-Head of Bay d'Espoir had a population of 669 living in 320 of its 358 total private dwellings, a change of −10.7% from its 2016 population of 749. With a land area of 24.95 km^{2} (9.63 sq mi), it had a population density of 26.8/km^{2} (69.4/sq mi) in 2021.

== See also ==
- Bay d'Espoir
- Bay d'Espoir Hydroelectric Power Station
- List of cities and towns in Newfoundland and Labrador
