= Peter Jeddore =

Peter Francis Jeddore (native name Saqamaw Piel; May 9, 1892 – May 18, 1970) was the fourth child of Noel Jeddore. Accepted by the Mi'kmaq of Miawpukek as Saqamaw, after his uncle Joseph Jeddore's death, although never "officially appointed" as such, he served his people from 1954 until his death in 1971. He made many prominent public defences of the Miawpukek Mi’kmaq’s rights to land and resources. Saqamaw Piel also served overseas with the Royal Newfoundland Regiment during World War I, first in the 9th Regiment, later in the British 29th Division.
