= St. Joseph's Cove, Bonne Bay, Newfoundland and Labrador =

Human settlement in Canada

Coordinates: 49.4875127°N 57.925479°W

Location of St. Joseph's Cove in Newfoundland and Labrador

St. Joseph's Cove is an abandoned community in Bonne Bay, Newfoundland and Labrador. It had a population of 52 in 1921 and 35 in 1945.

St. Joseph's Cove was abandoned sometime prior to 1955 as part of the Resettlement program.
