= St. Joseph's Cove-St. Veronica's, Newfoundland and Labrador =

St. Joseph's Cove-St. Veronica's
- Local service district / designated place
- Location of St. Joseph's Cove-St. Veronica's St. Joseph's Cove-St. Veronica's (Canada)
- Coordinates: 47.932°N 55.808°W
- Country: Canada
- Province: Newfoundland and Labrador
- Region: Newfoundland
- Census division: 3
- Census subdivision: D

Government
  - Type: Unincorporated

Area
  - Land: 25.71 km^{2} (9.93 sq mi)

Population (2021)
  - Total: 85
- Time zone: UTC−03:30 (NST)
  - Summer (DST): UTC−02:30 (NDT)
- Area code: 709
- Highways: Route 361

St. Joseph's Cove-St. Veronica's is a local service district and designated place in the Canadian province of Newfoundland and Labrador.

== Geography ==
St. Joseph's Cove-St. Veronica's is in the Bay d'Espoir region of Newfoundland within Subdivision D of Division No. 3.

== Demographics ==
As a designated place in the 2021 Census of Population conducted by Statistics Canada, St. Joseph's Cove-St. Veronica's recorded a population of 85 living in 41 of its 52 total private dwellings, a change of −27.4% from its 2016 population of 117. With a land area of 25.71 km^{2} (9.93 sq mi), it had a population density of 4.6/km^{2} (11.8/sq mi) in 2016.

== Government ==
St. Joseph's Cove-St. Veronica's is a local service district (LSD) that is governed by a committee responsible for the provision of certain services to the community. The chair of the LSD committee is Pat Organ.

== See also ==
- List of communities in Newfoundland and Labrador
- List of designated places in Newfoundland and Labrador
- List of local service districts in Newfoundland and Labrador
