= Dawson's Cove =

Coordinates: 47°32′05″N 55°55′57″W

Dawson's Cove, also known as Sandyville, is a small settlement, about 2 km away from the small outport community of Hermitage, that is a neighborhood of the town of Hermitage-Sandyville. Located on the southern shore of Newfoundland, Dawson's Cove is in Connaigre Bay, a finger-like projection of Newfoundland's Fortune Bay.

The town currently has an approximate population of around 60. The Dawson's Cove Post Office closed on September 13, 1966.

== See also ==
- List of communities in Newfoundland and Labrador
