= St. Alban's, Newfoundland and Labrador =

St. Alban's
- Town
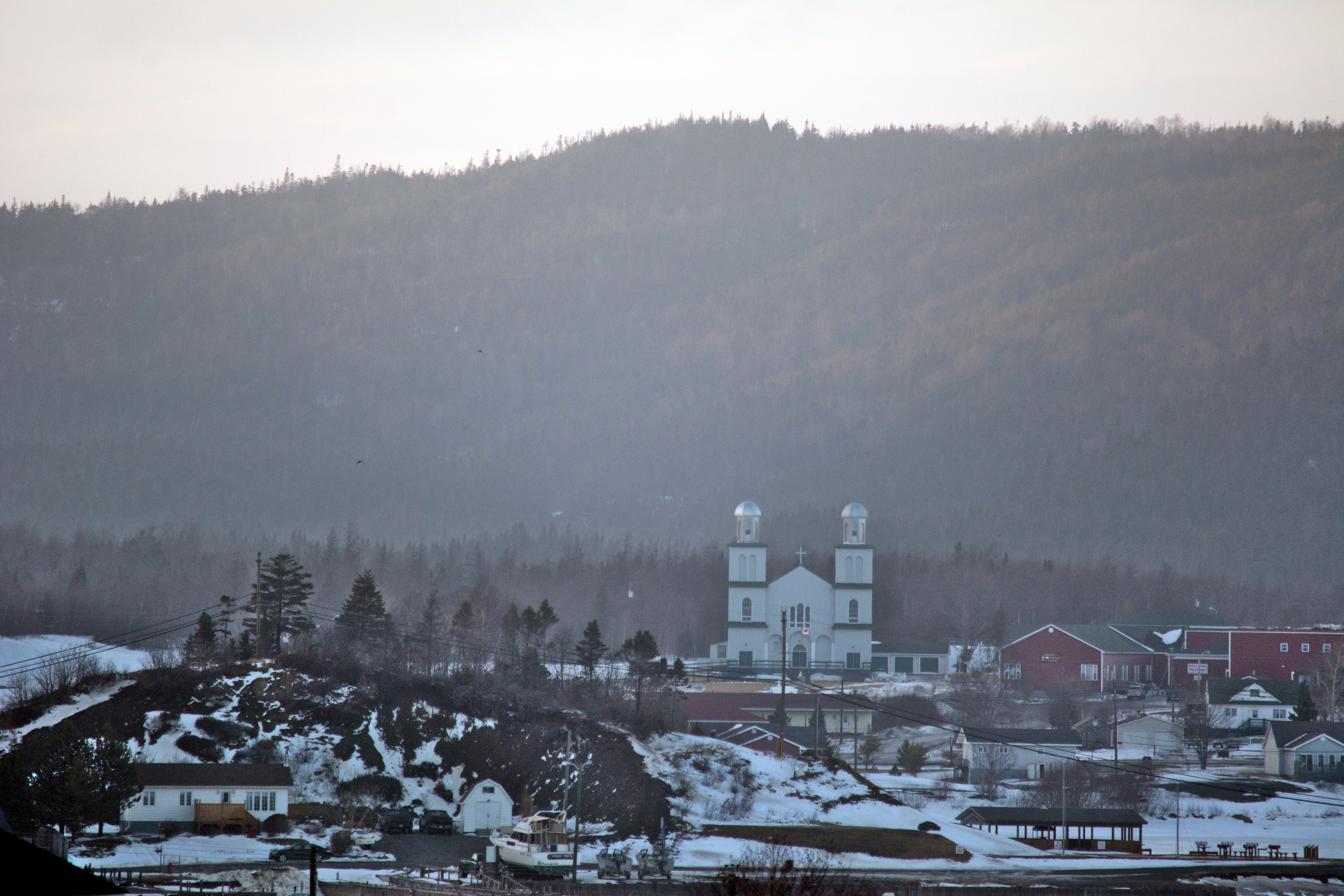
- St. Alban's overlooking St. Ignatius Parish
- Interactive map of St. Alban's
- Coordinates: 47°52′31″N 55°50′29″W
- Country: Canada
- Province: Newfoundland and Labrador
- Incorporated (town): 1953

Government
  - Mayor: Gerard Murphy
  - MHA: Elvis Loveless (LIB)

Population (2021)
  - Total: 1,189
- Time zone: UTC-3:30 (Newfoundland Time)
  - Summer (DST): UTC-2:30 (Newfoundland Daylight)
- Area code: 709
- Highways: Route 361
- Website: www.stalbans.ca

St. Alban's is a town in Bay d'Espoir, an arm of Hermitage Bay on the south coast of Newfoundland, Canada. It had a population of 1,189 in 2021 and is the largest community in Bay d'Espoir. It is 180 kilometres (110 mi) south of Grand Falls-Windsor.

== History ==
=== Early settlement ===
In the 17th century, French migratory fishermen began frequenting the eastern arm of Bay d'Espoir, with English fishermen following later. They travelled into the bay to obtain timber, which was used to repair fishing schooners and construct temporary shelters.

In 1765, British naval surveyor Captain James Cook visited Ship Cove, the site of present-day St. Alban's, while surveying the south coast of Newfoundland aboard the brig Grenville. After the vessel was damaged earlier in the surveying season, Cook put Grenville ashore at Ship Cove in late September for repairs. The ship remained there for approximately two weeks before departing on 9 October. Cook subsequently prepared charts and sailing directions covering Bay d'Espoir and surrounding portions of Newfoundland's south coast.

By the 1830s, logging crews were working seasonally in the area, while fishing families from communities near the mouth of Bay d'Espoir increasingly frequented the area during the following decades. Some eventually settled permanently. The Collier and Hoskins families are reported to have settled in Ship Cove in 1851, followed by the Organ family in 1853. Ship Cove was first recorded in the Newfoundland census in 1869, with a population of 39.

During the 1880s and 1890s, additional families moved to Ship Cove, many from the Roman Catholic community of Great Jervis. These included the Crant, Farrell, Howse, McDonald, Morris and Willcott families.

The early economy was based on subsistence agriculture, fishing, hunting, trapping and forestry. Residents grew crops and raised livestock, while fishing, hunting, trapping and logging supplemented household food and income.

=== Early to mid 20th century ===
Migration from surrounding communities continued into the early 20th century. Mi'kmaq families from communities such as Bay du Nord settled in Ship Cove and other nearby settlements, encouraged by the local Catholic priest to move closer to the church and school.

In 1915, Ship Cove was renamed St. Alban's to avoid confusion with other Newfoundland communities of the same name. The name honours Saint Alban, an English Christian martyr, and reflected the community's predominantly English Roman Catholic population.

Forestry played an increasingly important role in the local economy. In 1917, Father Stanislaus St. Croix established a parish sawmill, which became the basis for the St. Alban's Co-operative Society founded under his leadership in 1922. Members supplied logs to the co-operative in exchange for store credit. The organization also operated weaving and knitting equipment and shipped pulpwood to markets outside Newfoundland. Economic difficulties and the loss of markets caused it to suspend operations in 1932. The co-operative was later revived on a smaller scale, but a fire destroyed its store in 1947, and it ceased operations in 1955.

Commercial logging also became an important source of employment. Bowater's Newfoundland Pulp and Paper Mills began operating in the Bay d'Espoir region in the 1940s, employing workers from St. Alban's and nearby communities. Bowater's Bay d'Espoir operations ended in 1958, causing a significant economic setback in the region.

=== Hydroelectric development ===
Construction of the Bay d'Espoir Hydroelectric Power Station during the 1960s brought renewed economic activity to St. Alban's. Work began in 1964, and the town became a major supply centre for the project. With continuing resettlement from smaller communities in Bay d'Espoir and an influx of construction workers, the population of St. Alban's exceeded 2,000 by the mid-1960s. The project provided employment in the region, while the construction of the Bay d'Espoir Highway connected St. Alban's to Newfoundland's road network, reducing its reliance on coastal transportation. Mail and medical services had previously depended heavily on steamers, rowboats and other watercraft..

=== Aquaculture ===
In 1985, the Bay d'Espoir Development Association established a salmon hatchery near the Bay d'Espoir Hydroelectric Power Station. The hatchery used warmer water from the generating facility to increase the growth rate of the fish. The industry subsequently expanded, primarily farming Atlantic salmon and steelhead trout. By the early 2000s, a fish processing plant in St. Alban's employed more than 100 people, while other businesses provided services to the industry including cage construction, diving, site assessment and transportation.

In 2009, Cold Ocean Salmon registered plans for a new hatchery at Swanger Cove in St. Alban's. Designed to produce up to three million salmon smolts annually for marine grow-out operations along the south coast of Newfoundland, the facility represented a substantial expansion of the industry's hatchery capacity. The hatchery was completed as part of an expansion of salmonid hatchery capacity in the province by 2011.

In July 2011, the provincial government opened the $8.8-million Centre for Aquaculture Health and Development in St. Alban's. The centre provides diagnostic testing and other aquatic animal health services in support of the province's aquaculture industry.

=== 2016 flooding ===
St. Alban's, along with much of the island of Newfoundland, was severely affected by Hurricane Matthew in October 2016. Road access to the town was temporarily cut off by flooding washing away the main bridge. The nearby town of Conne River provided boat rides into the community while the road was being repaired.

== Economy ==
The major industries in the town and area include hydroelectric generation and aquaculture. As the largest community in Bay d'Espoir, St. Alban's serves as a centre for employment and services in the region.

St. Alban's is regarded as a hub for the aquaculture industry and the Newfoundland Aquaculture Industry Association (NAIA) maintains an office in the town. St. Alban's is also home to an Aquaculture Development Centre and Aquatic Fish Health Laboratory, a 58,000 square foot fish hatchery, aquaculture manufacturing and service firms, processing plant, and many offices that support these facilities. The aquaculture industry in the town and area in 2013 exceeded a production value of $200 million (nearly 20% of the total value of the seafood industry of Newfoundland and Labrador).

The Hydro Generation Site in the area is the largest on the island of Newfoundland and provides 2,650 GWh annually. The seven generating units produce a rated output of 604 MW.

== Demographics ==
In the 2021 Census of Population conducted by Statistics Canada, St. Alban's had a population of 1,189 living in 560 of its 650 total private dwellings, a change of 0.3% from its 2016 population of 1,186. With a land area of 20.48 km^{2} (7.91 sq mi), it had a population density of 58.1/km^{2} (150.4/sq mi) in 2021.

== Notable people ==
- Minnie White, accordionist

== See also ==
- Bay d'Espoir Academy
- Bay d'Espoir Hydroelectric Power Station
