= Furby's Cove =

Ghost town in Newfoundland and Labrador, Canada

Coordinates: 47.601°N 55.833°W

Location of Furby's Cove in Newfoundland and Labrador

Furby's Cove was a settlement in Newfoundland and Labrador, Canada, near Seal Cove. Like nearby Pass Island, it was one of the last of the 'resettled' communities on the island. Its last census entry was the 38 recorded in 1971, this down from the 58 people recorded five years earlier.
