= Gaultois =

- Town
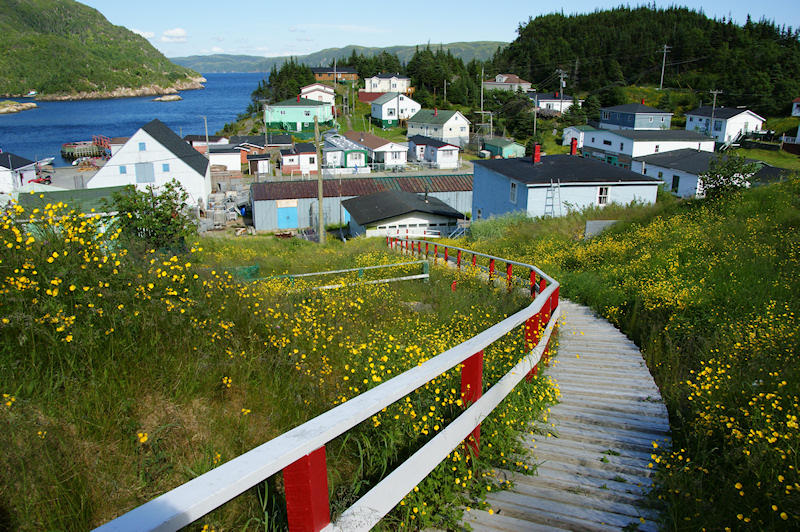

- Location of Gaultois in Newfoundland
- Coordinates: 47°36′N 55°55′W
- Country: Canada
- Province: Newfoundland and Labrador

Government
  - Mayor: Gordon Hunt

Area
  - Land: 4.33 km^{2} (1.67 sq mi)

Population (2021)
  - Total: 100
  - Density: 31.4/km^{2} (81/sq mi)
- Time zone: UTC-3:30 (Newfoundland Time)
  - Summer (DST): UTC-2:30 (Newfoundland Daylight)
- Area code: 709
- Highways: Passenger Ferry to Hermitage-Sandyville

Gaultois (/ˈɡɔːltæs/) is a small settlement in the Coast of Bays area in Newfoundland and Labrador, Canada. Gaultois had a population of 100 people in the 2021 census. The town has a K-12 school called Victoria Academy (as of 2022-23, there are 4 students enrolled), as well as a fire department, public library, Lion's Club, and town hall. The town is only accessible by ferry or helicopter. The provincial government ferry runs from the nearby town of Hermitage several times daily and the crossing takes approximately 20 minutes. This ferry also services the more remote community of McCallum once to twice daily with a crossing time of around one hour and fifteen minutes. In 2015, Gaultois voted against resettlement. Gaultois considered resettlement again in 2023 but it failed.

Before confederation with Canada in 1949, Gaultois was the customs town for those wishing to travel to the islands of Saint Pierre and Miquelon. Prior to resettlement, the population had declined to 107 in 1956 from a peak of 252 five years earlier. After resettlement in 1966 Gaultois population rose to 594 with the fish plant and its draggers as the main employer of the town. The first Waymaster in 1877, was Richard Bradshaw.

A fishing community, Gaultois went into a decline when the Lake Group first announced the closure of its fish plant in 1981 and again in 1990 when Fishery Products International closed the plant. The Gaultois fish plant permanently closed in 2010. As of 2017, the population has plunged by 80 percent since the 1990s.

Though small, Gaultois has four distinct areas:

1. The Room near the wharf where salt fish was traditionally dried on flakes for market.
2. The Valley up the hill a little then surrounded by high rock faces, home to about 10 homes.
3. The Point across the harbour from the Room. The most populated part of town. The Point and the Room are joined by a wooden boardwalk at the base of the rock face.
4. The Bottom up the hill and down the other side from the Point. The most isolated part of town.

== Demographics ==
In the 2021 Census of Population conducted by Statistics Canada, Gaultois had a population of 100 living in 45 of its 74 total private dwellings, a change of −26.5% from its 2016 population of 136. With a land area of 4.23 km^{2} (1.63 sq mi), it had a population density of 23.6/km^{2} (61.2/sq mi) in 2021.

== See also ==
- Connaigre Peninsula
- List of cities and towns in Newfoundland and Labrador
- Newfoundland outport
