= Seal Cove, Fortune Bay, Newfoundland and Labrador =

Seal Cove
- Town
- Location of Seal Cove in Newfoundland
- Coordinates: 47°29′05″N 56°03′41″W
- Country: Canada
- Province: Newfoundland and Labrador
- Incorporated (town): 1972

Population (2021)
  - Total: 215
- Time zone: UTC-3:30 (Newfoundland Time)
  - Summer (DST): UTC-2:30 (Newfoundland Daylight)
- Area code: 709
- Highways: Route 364

Seal Cove is a town in the Canadian province of Newfoundland and Labrador, located on Fortune Bay. The town had a population of 215 in the 2021 Census. The population of Seal Cove, Fortune Bay has fallen to approximately 215 largely due to outmigration for education and work-related pursuits. The town was incorporated in 1972. The town is 230 kilometres (140 mi) southwest of Grand Falls-Windsor.

Historically, residents earned a living by fishing and logging for the large pulp and paper companies located in Central and Western parts of the province. In recent years there has been a greater dependency on work in the construction industry.

== Demographics ==
In the 2021 Census of Population conducted by Statistics Canada, Seal Cove had a population of 215 living in 49 of its 66 total private dwellings, a change of −11.2% from its 2016 population of 242. With a land area of 2.03 km^{2} (0.78 sq mi), it had a population density of 49.3/km^{2} (127.6/sq mi) in 2021.

== Notable residents ==
Marissa Mullins (palaeontologist)

== See also ==
- List of cities and towns in Newfoundland and Labrador
- Newfoundland outport
