= Miawpukek First Nation =

- Band No. 47
- People: Miꞌkmaq
- Headquarters: Samiajij Miawpukek
- Province: Newfoundland and Labrador

Land
- Other reserve: Samiajij Miawpukek
- Land area: 28.39 km^{2} (10.96 sq mi)

Population (2023)
- On reserve: 836
- On other land: 2
- Off reserve: 2263
- Total population: 3101

Government
- Chief: Brad Benoit
- Council: Vice Chief Frank Benoit

Website
- mfngov.ca

Samiajij Miawpukek
- Indian reserve
- Samiajij Miawpukek Indian Reserve
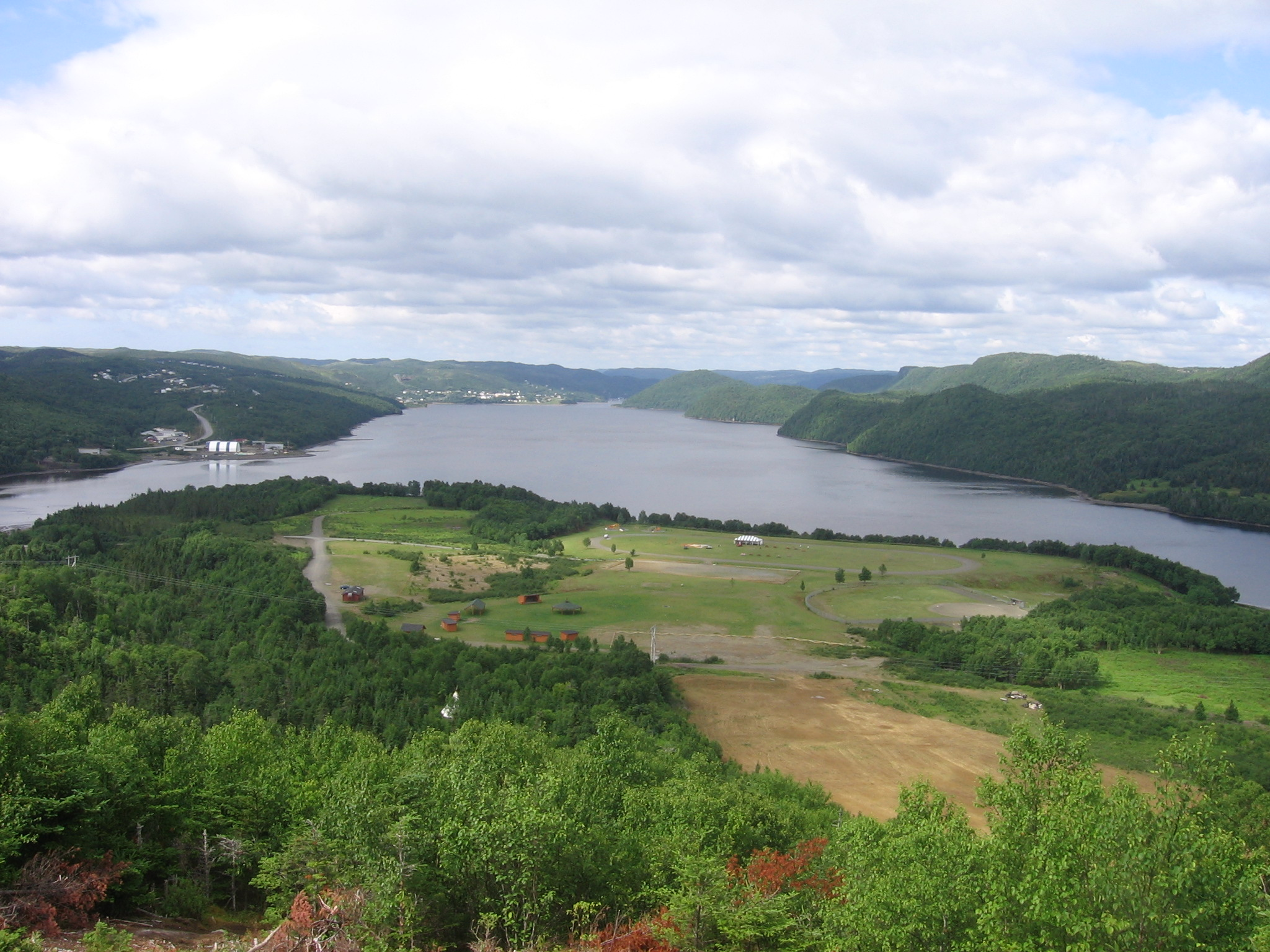

- Location within Newfoundland and Labrador
- Coordinates: 47°52′0″N 55°44′37″W
- Country: Canada
- Province: Newfoundland and Labrador
- Settled: 1822
- Recognition under the Indian Act: 1987

Government
  - Chief: Brad Benoit
  - Federal MP: Clifford Small (CPC)
  - Provincial MHA: Elvis Loveless (LIB)

Population (2023)
  - Total: 836
- Time zone: UTC-3:30 (Newfoundland Time Zone)
- Area code: 709
- GNBC Code: ACPWX
- Highways: Route 365

Miawpukek First Nation is a Mi'kmaq First Nations band government in Conne River, Newfoundland and Labrador, Canada; the band has a registered population of 836 living on-reserve as of May 2023, with another 2,265 living off-reserve. They control the reserve of Samiajij Miawpukek in Bay d'Espoir on the island of Newfoundland. It was formerly known as Conne River Indian Reserve until the mid-1980s. Samiajij Miawpukek was established as a federal Indian reserve in 1987, the first in Newfoundland and Labrador. In 1991, Miawpukek was one of the poorest communities in Atlantic Canada. Due in part to increased education of its members, it has gone on to become the most well-off First Nation in Atlantic Canada after Membertou.

== Attractions ==
The powwow, started in 1996, is held every year.

In 2019, the Miawpukek First Nation opened the "Cannabis Boutique", which they claim is "the first Indigenous-owned and -operated marijuana store in Newfoundland".

== See also ==
- List of communities in Newfoundland and Labrador
- List of Indian reserves in Canada
- Noel Jeddore
- Peter Jeddore
