= Hermitage-Sandyville =

- Town
- Location of Hermitage-Sandyville in Newfoundland
- Coordinates: 47°33′N 55°56′W
- Country: Canada
- Province: Newfoundland and Labrador

Government
  - Mayor: Steven Crewe
  - MHA: Elvis Loveless (LIB)

Population (2021)
  - Total: 404
- Time zone: UTC-3:30 (Newfoundland Time)
  - Summer (DST): UTC-2:30 (Newfoundland Daylight)
- Area code: 709
- Highways: Route 364
- Website: http://www.hermitage-sandyville.ca/

Hermitage-Sandyville is a small town on the south coast of Newfoundland, Canada, with a population of 404 people in the 2021 Census. The main source of income for the community is provided by the aquaculture industry, the local salmon plant and fishing. The town is 215 kilometres (134 mi) southwest of Grand Falls-Windsor.

The school in Hermitage is John Watkins Academy, where students of both Hermitage-Sandyville and Seal Cove attend. The school mascot is the JWA Rebels. Students in this school (currently 23 students) range from Kindergarten to Grade 12.

Hermitage is the location of the ferry port for servicing the isolated outports of Gaultois and McCallum. The community is 50km Northwest of Harbour Breton.

== Name ==
Channel Island settlers noted the resemblance of an offshore island to Hermitage Rock, a tidal island off the coast of Saint Helier, Jersey. This rock was the supposed location of Saint Helier's hermitage. Both the town and the bay are named after that rock.

== Demographics ==
In the 2021 Census of Population conducted by Statistics Canada, Hermitage-Sandyville had a population of 404 living in 189 of its 219 total private dwellings, a change of −4.3% from its 2016 population of 422. With a land area of 29.14 km^{2} (11.25 sq mi), it had a population density of 13.9/km^{2} (35.9/sq mi) in 2021.
