= Bay d'Espoir =

Bay in Newfoundland and Labrador, Canada

Coordinates: 47°40′26″N 56°06′27″W

Location of Bay d'Espoir in Newfoundland

Bay d'Espoir (/ˌbeɪdəsˈpɛər/ BAY-dəs-PAIR) is an estuarine fjord and arm of Hermitage Bay in the Gulf of Saint Lawrence, located on the south coast of Newfoundland. Communities in Bay d'Espoir include: Milltown-Head of Bay d'Espoir, Morrisville, St. Alban's, St. Joseph's Cove, St. Veronica's and Miawpukek. The Miawpukek First Nation reserve of Samiajij Miawpukek (Conne River) is located in Bay d'Espoir.

== Name ==
The name appears in printed form with many different spellings, some of which are: Bay D' Espoir/e, Bay of Despair, Bay Despoir/e, Baie D' Espoir/e, Baie Despair and Baie Despoir/e.

Bay d'Espoir is often translated locally either as Bay of Hope or Bay of Despair. The name Bay of Despair may be an English corruption of the French name Baie d'Espoir. However, the French cartographer Bellin referred to the bay as "Baie du Desespoir" on his 1743 map "Carte de l'Isle de Terre-Neuve". Therefore, the actual sequence may have been from "Baie du Desespoir" to the English literal translation "Bay of Despair", which appears as early as 1733 on a Henry Popple map, and then to a French corruption of this, namely "Baie d'Espoir". The English name "Bay of Despair" can also be found in a navigation guide written by James Cook.

Another proposed origin is the French Baie des Esprits ("Bay of Spirits"). Toponymist William B. Hamilton states that this was the original French name and that it was later anglicized as "Bay Despair", before the Newfoundland government adopted Bay d'Espoir ("Bay of Hope"). Historian Olaf Uwe Janzen disputes Hamilton's interpretation, arguing that the French name was instead Baie de Désespoir ("Bay of Despair").

== In popular culture ==
Bay d'Espoir is the feature location of Farley Mowat's 2006 autobiography "Bay of Spirits", in which Mowat chronicles his time living on the southwest coast of the island of Newfoundland.

It is the birthplace of the actress Joanne Kelly of Warehouse 13 fame.

== See also ==
- Bay d'Espoir Academy
- Bay d'Espoir Hydroelectric Power Station
- List of communities in Newfoundland and Labrador
