= Index of Saint Pierre and Miquelon–related articles =

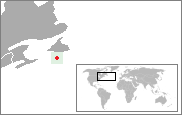
The location of the French territorial collectivity of Saint Pierre and Miquelon

The following is an alphabetical list of topics related to the French territorial collectivity of Saint Pierre and Miquelon.

== 0–9 ==
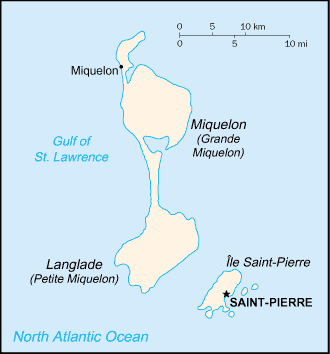
A map of Saint Pierre and Miquelon

- .pm – Internet country code top-level domain for Saint Pierre and Miquelon

== A ==
- Air Saint-Pierre
- Airports in Saint Pierre and Miquelon
- Americas
  - North America
    - Northern America
      - North Atlantic Ocean
        - Golfe du Saint-Laurent (Gulf of Saint Lawrence)
          - Cabot Strait
            - Islands of Saint Pierre and Miquelon
- Archipelago Tomorrow
- Atlantic Jet
- Atlantic Ocean
- Atlas of Saint-Pierre and Miquelon

== C ==
- Canada

The Coat of arms of Saint Pierre and Miquelon

- Canada–France relations
- Canada–France Maritime Boundary Case
- Capital of Saint Pierre and Miquelon: Saint-Pierre on Île Saint-Pierre
- Categories:
  - Category:Saint Pierre and Miquelon
    - Category:Buildings and structures in Saint Pierre and Miquelon
    - Category:Communications in Saint Pierre and Miquelon
    - Category:Culture of Saint Pierre and Miquelon
    - Category:Economy of Saint Pierre and Miquelon
    - Category:Education in Saint Pierre and Miquelon
    - Category:Environment of Saint Pierre and Miquelon
    - Category:Geography of Saint Pierre and Miquelon
    - Category:History of Saint Pierre and Miquelon
    - Category:Saint Pierre and Miquelon people
    - Category:Politics of Saint Pierre and Miquelon
    - Category:Saint Pierre and Miquelon-related lists
    - Category:Society of Saint Pierre and Miquelon
    - Category:Sport in Saint Pierre and Miquelon
    - Category:Transport in Saint Pierre and Miquelon
  - commons:Category:Saint Pierre and Miquelon
- Cities of Saint-Pierre and Miquelon
- Coat of arms of Saint Pierre and Miquelon
- Collectivité territoriale de Saint-Pierre-et-Miquelon (French territorial collectivity of Saint Pierre and Miquelon)
- Communications in Saint Pierre and Miquelon

== D ==
- Demographics of Saint Pierre and Miquelon
- La Dune

== E ==
- Economy of Saint Pierre and Miquelon
- Elections in Saint Pierre and Miquelon

== F ==
The Flag of Canada

- Flag of Canada

The Flag of France

- Flag of France
- Flag of Saint Pierre and Miquelon
- Franc
- France
- French America
- French colonization of the Americas
- French language
- French Republic
- French territorial collectivity of Saint Pierre and Miquelon (Collectivité territoriale de Saint-Pierre-et-Miquelon)
- French Republic (République française)

== G ==
- Geography of Saint Pierre and Miquelon
- Golfe du Saint-Laurent
- Grand Barachois
- Grand Colombier
- Gross domestic product
- Gulf of Saint Lawrence

== H ==
- History of Saint Pierre and Miquelon

== I ==
- International Organization for Standardization (ISO)
  - ISO 3166-1 alpha-2 country code for Saint Pierre and Miquelon: PM
  - ISO 3166-1 alpha-3 country code for Saint Pierre and Miquelon: SPM
- Internet in Saint Pierre and Miquelon
- Islands of Saint Pierre and Miquelon
  - Grand Colombier
  - Île de Langlade
  - Île de Miquelon
  - Île Saint-Pierre
  - L'Île-aux-Marins
  - L'Île-aux-Vainqueurs
  - La Dune

== L ==
- Lists related to Saint Pierre and Miquelon:
  - List of airports in Saint Pierre and Miquelon
  - List of cities in Saint-Pierre and Miquelon
  - List of countries by GDP (nominal)
  - List of islands of Saint Pierre and Miquelon
  - List of mammals in Saint Pierre and Miquelon
  - List of people from Saint Pierre et Miquelon
  - List of political parties in Saint Pierre and Miquelon
  - List of rivers of Saint Pierre and Miquelon
  - List of Saint Pierre and Miquelon-related topics
  - Topic outline of Saint Pierre and Miquelon
- Langlade Island
- L'Île-aux-Marins

== M ==
- Mammals of Saint Pierre and Miquelon
- Miquelon Airport
- Miquelon-Langlade
- Miquelon Island
- Miquelon, Miquelon-Langlade
- Municipal governments in Saint Pierre and Miquelon

== N ==
- Newfoundland and Labrador, Saint Pierre and Miquelon's neighbour
- Eugène Nicole
- North America
- North Atlantic Ocean
- Northern America
- Northern Hemisphere

== P ==
- Pointe aux Cannon Battery
- Political parties in Saint Pierre and Miquelon
- Politics of Saint Pierre and Miquelon
- Postage stamps and postal history of St. Pierre and Miquelon
- Prefect of Saint Pierre and Miquelon

== R ==
- République française (French Republic)
- Rivers of Saint Pierre and Miquelon
- Roman Catholic Vicariate Apostolic of Iles Saint Pierre and Miquelon

== S ==
- Saint-Pierre on Île Saint-Pierre – Capital of Saint Pierre and Miquelon
- Saint-Pierre Airport
- Saint Pierre and Miquelon (Saint-Pierre-et-Miquelon)
- Saint Pierre and Miquelon national football team
- Saint Pierre and Miquelon Satellite Station
- SPM Ferries
- SPM Telecom
- Saint-Pierre Cathedral
- Saint Pierre Island
- Saint-Pierre-et-Miquelon's 1st constituency
- Scouting in Saint Pierre and Miquelon
- Stade John Girardin

== T ==
- Territorial Council of Saint Pierre and Miquelon
- Topic outline of Saint Pierre and Miquelon
- Transportation in Saint Pierre and Miquelon

== W ==
- Western Hemisphere
- The Widow of Saint-Pierre
- Wikimedia Atlas of Saint-Pierre and Miquelon
- Wikipedia:WikiProject Topic outline/Drafts/Topic outline of Saint Pierre and Miquelon

== See also ==
- List of international rankings
- Lists of country-related topics
- Topic outline of geography
- Topic outline of North America
- Topic outline of Saint Pierre and Miquelon
