= Outline of Saint Pierre and Miquelon =

Overview of and topical guide to Saint Pierre and Miquelon

The Flag of Saint Pierre and Miquelon

The Coat of arms of Saint Pierre and Miquelon

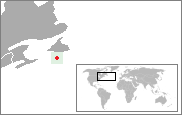
The location of Saint Pierre and Miquelon

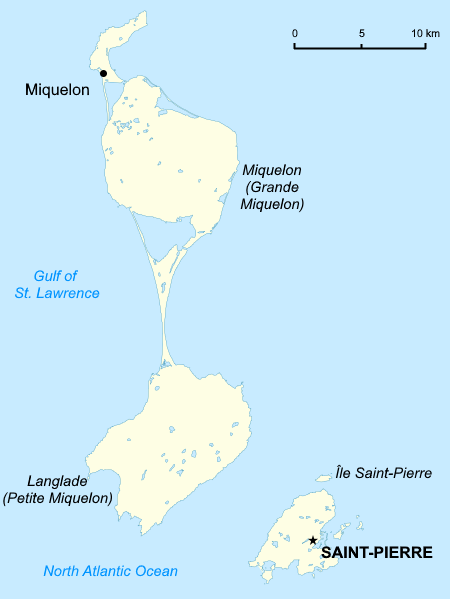
A detailed map of the French Territorial Collectivity of Saint Pierre and Miquelon

The following outline is provided as an overview of and topical guide to Saint Pierre and Miquelon:

The Territorial Collectivity of Saint Pierre and Miquelon (French: Collectivité territoriale de Saint-Pierre-et-Miquelon) is an overseas collectivity of France located in the North Atlantic Ocean about 30 kilometres (19 mi) south of the Canadian Island of Newfoundland. The collectivity comprises a group of small islands, the main ones being Saint Pierre and Miquelon.

The islands are part of France and the European Union but due to special immigration procedures, EU nationals who are not French citizens are not allowed to exercise free movement and business establishment in the archipelago.

The archipelago is the only remnant of the former colonial territory of New France that remains under French control.

== General reference ==
- Pronunciation: /ˌseɪnt piːˈɛər ... ˌmɪkəˈlɒn/; French: [sɛ̃ pjɛʁ e mikˈlɔ̃]
- Common English country name: Saint Pierre and Miquelon
- Official English country name: The French Territorial Collectivity of Saint Pierre and Miquelon
- Common endonym: Saint-Pierre et Miquelon
- Official endonym: Collectivité territoriale de Saint-Pierre-et-Miquelon
- Adjectival(s): Saint-Pierrais, Miquelonnais
- Demonym(s): Saint-Pierrais, Pierrois (older usage, particularly for residents of Saint Pierre Island), Miquelonais, French, Frenchman, Frenchwoman
- Etymology: Name of Saint Pierre and Miquelon
- ISO country codes: PM, SPM, 666
- ISO region codes: See ISO 3166-2:PM
- Internet country code top-level domain: .pm

== Geography of Saint Pierre and Miquelon ==
Geography of Saint Pierre and Miquelon

The Saint Pierre and Miquelon archipelago adjacent to Newfoundland (Island), Cabot Strait, and Cape Breton Island

- Saint Pierre and Miquelon is: an overseas collectivity of France
- Location: 46°47′N 56°12′W
  - Northern Hemisphere and Western Hemisphere
    - North America (though not on the mainland)
  - Atlantic Ocean
    - North Atlantic (south of Newfoundland, Canada)
  - Time zone: UTC-03, summer UTC-02
  - Extreme points of Saint Pierre and Miquelon
    - High: Morne de la Grande Montagne on Miquelon 240 m (787 ft)
    - Low: North Atlantic Ocean 0 m (0 ft)
  - Land boundaries: none
  - Coastline: North Atlantic Ocean 120 kilometres (75 mi)
- Population of Saint Pierre and Miquelon: 7,063 (2009 estimate)
- Area of Saint Pierre and Miquelon: 242 km^{2} (93 mi^{2})
- Atlas of Saint Pierre and Miquelon

=== Environment of Saint Pierre and Miquelon ===
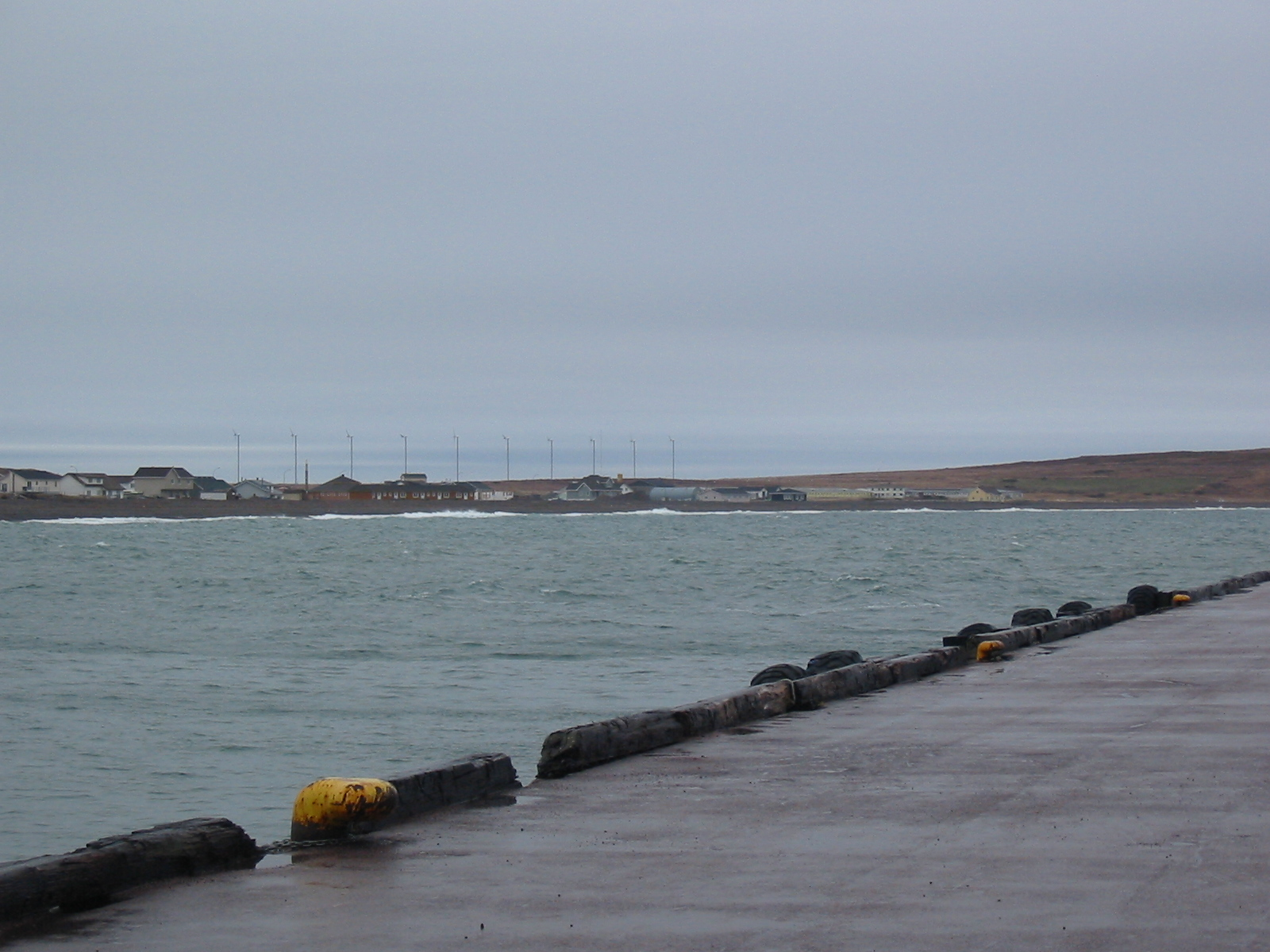
10 wind turbines provide power to the settlement of Miquelon, Miquelon-Langlade

- Climate of Saint Pierre and Miquelon
- Renewable energy in Saint Pierre and Miquelon
- Geology of Saint Pierre and Miquelon
- Protected areas of Saint Pierre and Miquelon
  - Biosphere reserves in Saint Pierre and Miquelon
  - National parks of Saint Pierre and Miquelon
- Wildlife of Saint Pierre and Miquelon
  - Fauna of Saint Pierre and Miquelon
    - Birds of Saint Pierre and Miquelon
    - Mammals of Saint Pierre and Miquelon

==== Natural geographic features of Saint Pierre and Miquelon ====
- Islands of Saint Pierre and Miquelon
- Rivers of Saint Pierre and Miquelon
- World Heritage Sites in Saint Pierre and Miquelon: None

=== Regions of Saint Pierre and Miquelon ===
- List of cities in Saint-Pierre and Miquelon

=== Demography of Saint Pierre and Miquelon ===
- Demographics of Saint Pierre and Miquelon
- Saint Pierre and Miquelon Islanders

=== Neighbours of Saint Pierre and Miquelon ===
Saint Pierre and Miquelon shares a maritime border with:

- Canada
  - Newfoundland and Labrador

== Government and politics of Saint Pierre and Miquelon ==
Politics of Saint Pierre and Miquelon

- Form of government:
- Capital of Saint Pierre and Miquelon: Saint-Pierre
- Elections in Saint Pierre and Miquelon
  - Legislative elections: 2000 - 2006
- Political parties in Saint Pierre and Miquelon

=== Branches of the government of Saint Pierre and Miquelon ===
Government of Saint Pierre and Miquelon

==== Executive branch of the government of Saint Pierre and Miquelon ====
- Head of state: President of France
- Head of government: Prefect of Saint Pierre and Miquelon
- Cabinet of Saint Pierre and Miquelon

==== Legislative branch of the government of Saint Pierre and Miquelon ====
- National:
  - Saint-Pierre-et-Miquelon's 1st constituency
  - 1 deputy in the National Assembly of France
  - 1 senator in the Senate of France
- Territorial:
  - Territorial Council of Saint Pierre and Miquelon

=== Foreign relations of Saint Pierre and Miquelon ===
==== International organization membership ====
The Territorial Collectivity of Saint Pierre and Miquelon is a member of:

- Universal Postal Union (UPU)
- World Federation of Trade Unions (WFTU)

=== Law and order in Saint Pierre and Miquelon ===
  - LGBT rights in Saint Pierre and Miquelon
- Law enforcement in Saint Pierre and Miquelon

=== Local government in Saint Pierre and Miquelon ===
Municipal governments in Saint Pierre and Miquelon

== Culture of Saint Pierre and Miquelon ==
Culture of Saint Pierre and Miquelon

- Languages of Saint Pierre and Miquelon
  - Saint Pierre and Miquelon French
- National symbols of Saint Pierre and Miquelon
  - Coat of arms of Saint Pierre and Miquelon
  - Flag of Saint Pierre and Miquelon
  - National anthem of Saint Pierre and Miquelon
- Public holidays in Saint Pierre and Miquelon
- Roman Catholic Vicariate Apostolic of Iles Saint Pierre and Miquelon
- World Heritage Sites in Saint Pierre and Miquelon: None

=== Art in Saint Pierre and Miquelon ===
- Art in Saint Pierre and Miquelon
- Cinema of Saint Pierre and Miquelon
  - The Widow of Saint-Pierre
- Literature of Saint Pierre and Miquelon
- Music of Saint Pierre and Miquelon
- Television in Saint Pierre and Miquelon
- Theatre in Saint Pierre and Miquelon

=== Sport in Saint Pierre and Miquelon ===
Sport in Saint Pierre and Miquelon

- Football in Saint Pierre and Miquelon
  - Saint Pierre and Miquelon national football team
- Saint Pierre and Miquelon at the Olympics

== Economy and infrastructure of Saint Pierre and Miquelon ==
Economy of Saint Pierre and Miquelon

- Economic rank, by nominal GDP (2007):
- Communications in Saint Pierre and Miquelon
  - Internet in Saint Pierre and Miquelon

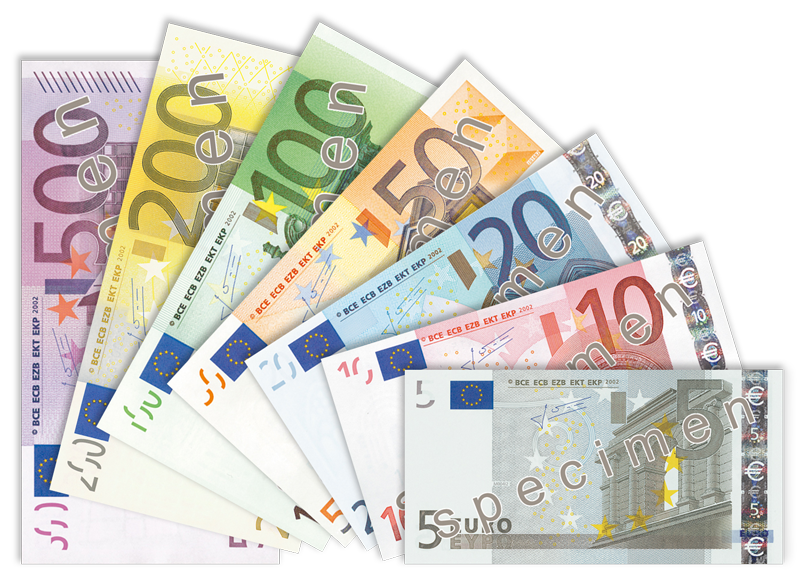
Euro banknotes

- Currency of Saint Pierre and Miquelon: Euro (see also: Euro topics)
  - ISO 4217: EUR
- Transport in Saint Pierre and Miquelon
  - Airports in Saint Pierre and Miquelon

== Education in Saint Pierre and Miquelon ==
Education in Saint Pierre and Miquelon

== See also ==
Saint Pierre and Miquelon

- Index of Saint Pierre and Miquelon-related articles
- List of international rankings
- Outline of France
- Outline of geography
- Outline of North America
