= List of islands of Saint Pierre and Miquelon =

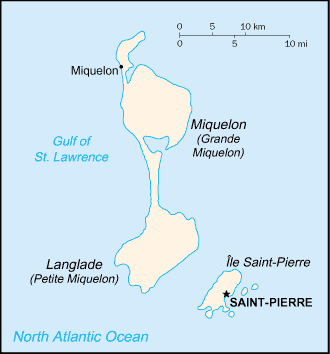
A map of the French territorial collectivity of Saint Pierre and Miquelon

The following is a list of the islands of the French territorial collectivity of Saint Pierre and Miquelon.

Saint Pierre and Miquelon was a colony of France. It became an overseas territory in 1946, an overseas department on 1976-07-19, and then a collectivité territoriale (territorial collectivity) on 1985-06-11. Saint Pierre and Miquelon has a department code of 975, which is an extension of the French system.

Saint Pierre and Miquelon is divided into two communes, which are Miquelon-Langlade and Saint-Pierre. Out of the two, Saint-Pierre is the most populous, even though it is the smaller commune in area.

== Islands ==
- Grand Colombier
- Chevaux
- Langlade
- Le Cap
- Île de Miquelon (the largest island by area in the territory)
- Saint-Pierre
- L'Île-aux-Marins
- L'Île-aux-Pigeons
- L'Île-aux-Vainqueurs
- La Dune

== Major Islands’ Areas Mixed With Population ==
The largest island in area is Miquelon, which has an area of 106 km^{2} (41 sq mi). However, it has a surprisingly low population around 580.

Langlade is the second largest island in terms of area, with 95km². Even though its size is pretty big compared to other islands around the Caribbean, the population is just around 10.

Saint Pierre comes in third by area, being 25km², and it is the largest island by population standards, with 6,000 people. The island houses the capital of the territory, Saint-Pierre, which comprises most of the population.

== See also ==
- Saint Pierre and Miquelon
  - Geography of Saint Pierre and Miquelon
  - List of Saint Pierre and Miquelon-related topics
- List of islands by area
- List of islands by highest point
- List of islands by population
