= Île aux Chevaux =

Island in Saint-Pierre and Miquelon

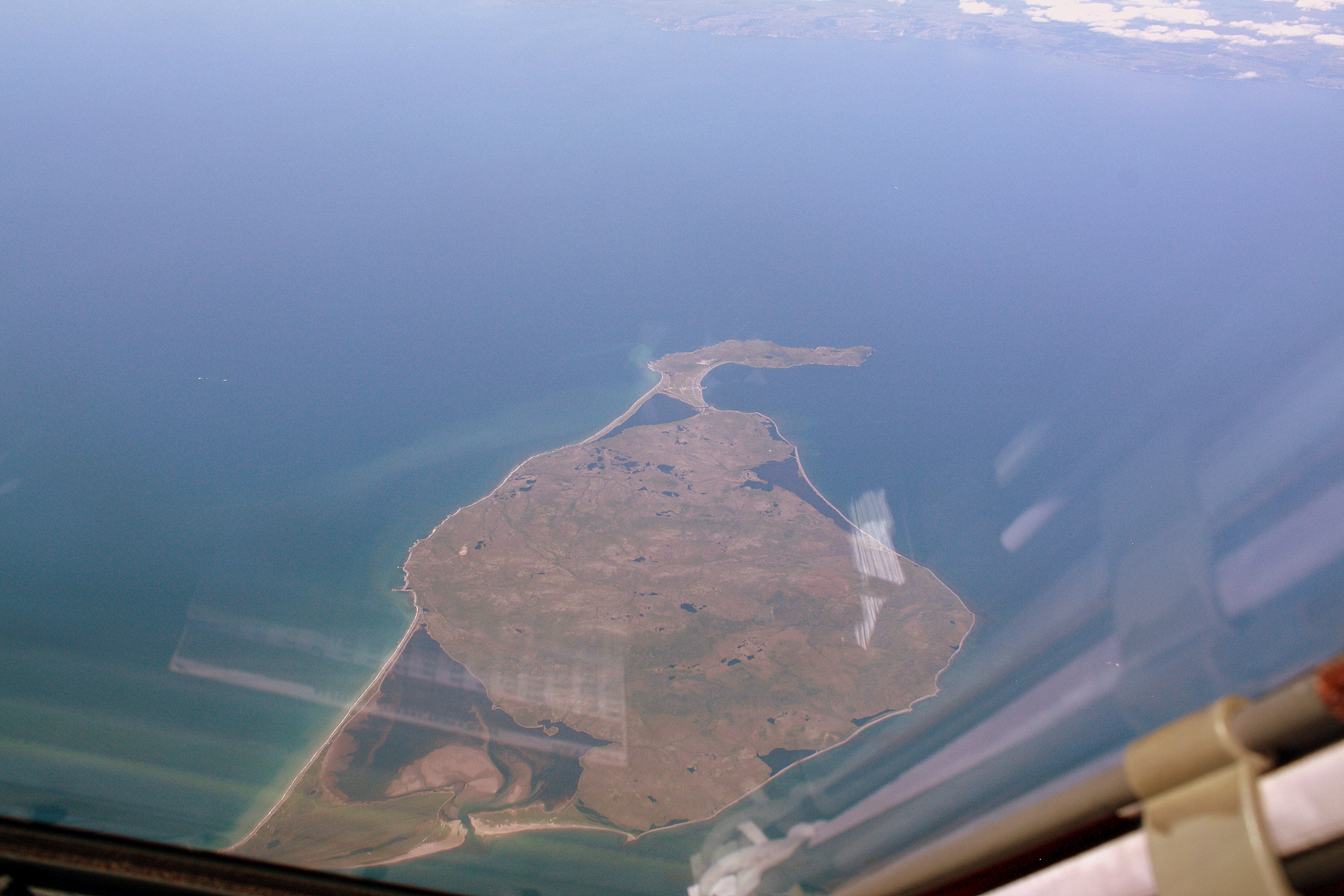
- Île aux Chevaux is in the north end of the Grand Barachois, a lagoon between the islands of Le Cap and Miquelon, fewer than 100 meters off the southern shores of the latter. Its spit comes about 40 meters east of an easterly spit off the Miquelon southern coast.

- Location within Saint Pierre and Miquelon

Geography
- Location: Atlantic Ocean
- Coordinates: 46°59′57.1″N 56°18′34.1″W
- Archipelago: Saint Pierre and Miquelon
- Adjacent to: Gulf of Saint Lawrence

Administration
- France
- Overseas collectivity: Saint Pierre and Miquelon

Demographics
- Languages: French

Additional information
- Official website: http://www.miquelon-langlade.com

Île aux Chevaux is an island in Saint Pierre and Miquelon, a French territory off the southern coast of Newfoundland, Canada.

== Location ==
Île aux Chevaux is in the north end of the Grand Barachois, a lagoon between the islands of Le Cap and Miquelon, fewer than 100 meters off the southern shores of the latter.

== See also ==
- Geography of Saint Pierre and Miquelon
- List of Saint Pierre and Miquelon-related topics
