= Geography of Saint Pierre and Miquelon =

Saint-Pierre and Miquelon
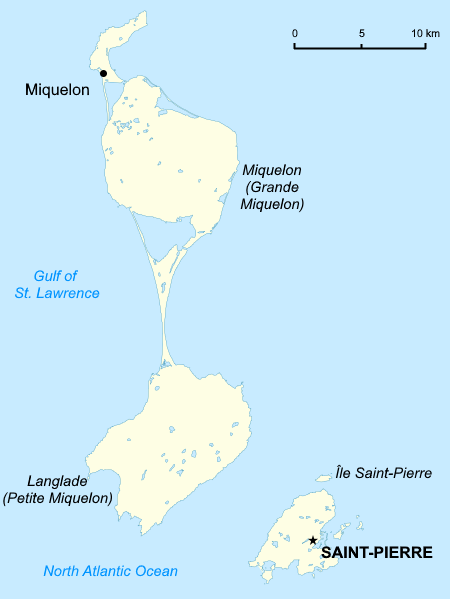
- Capital: Saint-Pierre; 46°47′N 56°11′W
- Largest city: Saint-Pierre

Area
  - Total: 242 km^{2} (93 sq mi)

Population
  - July 2007 census: 7,036
  - Density: 25/km^{2} (64.7/sq mi) (176th)

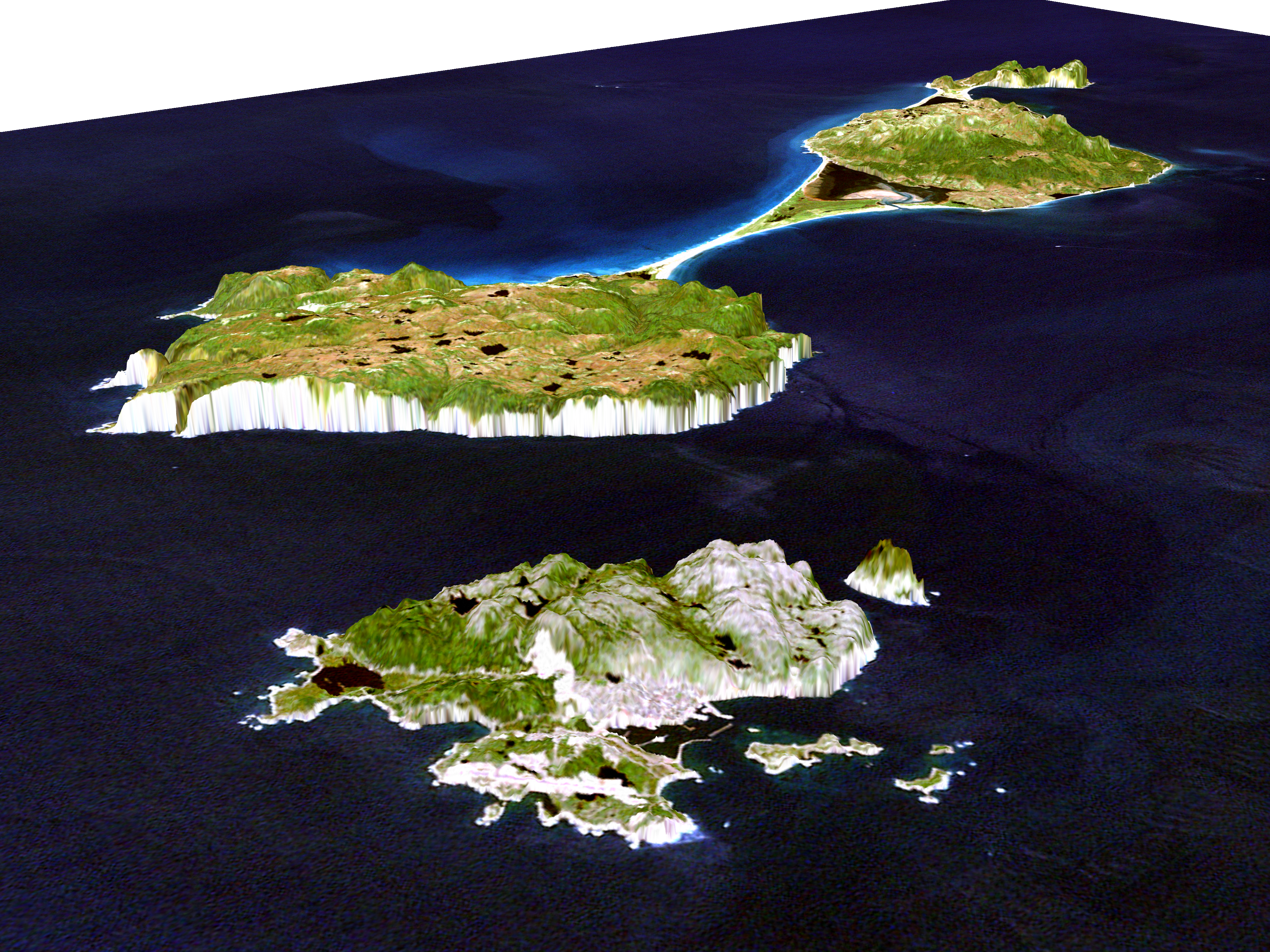
Simulated view of the islands by NASA

Saint Pierre and Miquelon is a French overseas collectivity in the Western Hemisphere and the Northern Hemisphere. It consists of an island archipelago, off the coast of Newfoundland, near North America. The collectivity shares a maritime boundary with Canada.

== Location ==
Saint Pierre and Miquelon is situated south of Newfoundland in the Gulf of Saint Lawrence in the North Atlantic Ocean. Its distance north–south from Newfoundland is 60 kilometres (32 nmi). The islands are even closer to the long Burin Peninsula, which is situated just 25 kilometres (13 nmi) to the east. In addition, Green Island, which belongs to Newfoundland, is located about halfway between the southern part of Miquelon-Langlade and Newfoundland at 46°52′44″N 56°05′21″W, only 10 kilometres (6 mi) from both Langlade and St. Pierre.

== Physical geography ==
Saint Pierre and Miquelon is an archipelago of eight islands, Saint-Pierre (25 km^{2}) and Miquelon-Langlade (216 km^{2}) being the major ones. Collectively the area of the islands is 242 km^{2}, which is about the size of Brooklyn in New York City. The total coastline is 120 km. The territory also includes the surrounding fishing areas in the North Atlantic Ocean.

=== Saint-Pierre ===
The island of Saint-Pierre is surrounded to the south-east by smaller dependencies, Petit Colombier, Île aux Marins, Île aux Pigeons and Île aux Vainqueurs, and Grand Colombier to the north. These islands have all been inhabited at one time or another. The settlement of Saint Pierre on Saint Pierre Island is the largest settlement in Saint Pierre and Miquelon.

St. Pierre is separated from Miquelon-Langlade by a 6 kilometres (3.2 nmi) strait with very fierce currents. Fishermen call this section of ocean "The Mouth of Hell". The waters around these islands are very treacherous, and there have been over 600 shipwrecks along the coasts of the islands. The terrain is also described as mostly barren rock.

=== Miquelon-Langlade ===
The island(s) of Miquelon-Langlade consists of three formerly separate islands Miquelon (110 km^{2}), Langlade (91 km^{2}) and Le Cap. In the 18th century, an isthmus of sand called La Dune was formed naturally between Miquelon and Langlade. The isthmus was reinforced by hand with sand and Quaternary deposits to what is now a 13-kilometre (8.1 mi) sand dune. Along the isthmus, there are over 500 wrecked ships.

What was originally the island Miquelon is now also called Grande Miquelon while Petite Miquelon refers to Langlade. The settlement of Miquelon lies at the junction of the northwest corner of Miquelon Island and Le Cap.

== Climate ==
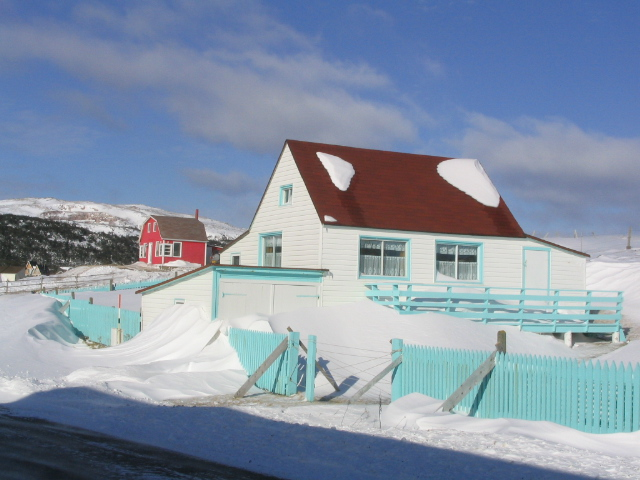
Winters in Saint-Pierre feature windswept snowfalls, 28 January 2005

The climate is very damp and windy and winters are harsh and long. The spring and early summer are foggy and cool. Late summer and early fall are sunny. Winds pick up during spring and autumn.

Comparison of local Meteorological data with other cities in France
Town	Sunshine (hours/yr)	Rain (mm/yr)	Snow (days/yr)	Storm (days/yr)	Fog (days/yr)
National average	1,973	770	14	22	40
Saint Pierre and Miquelon	1,427	1,323.5	99.0	6.6	100.8
Paris	1,661	637	12	18	10
Nice	2,724	767	1	29	1
Strasbourg	1,693	665	29	29	56
Brest	1,605	1,211	7	12	75

Climate data for St Pierre and Miquelon (1981–2010 averages, extremes 1941–present)
Month	Jan	Feb	Mar	Apr	May	Jun	Jul	Aug	Sep	Oct	Nov	Dec	Year
Record high °C (°F)	9.8 (49.6)	9.4 (48.9)	12.2 (54.0)	13.8 (56.8)	22.0 (71.6)	25.1 (77.2)	28.3 (82.9)	26.2 (79.2)	26.8 (80.2)	20.1 (68.2)	15.1 (59.2)	12.8 (55.0)	28.3 (82.9)
Mean daily maximum °C (°F)	−0.1 (31.8)	−0.7 (30.7)	1.0 (33.8)	4.3 (39.7)	8.5 (47.3)	12.5 (54.5)	16.7 (62.1)	18.7 (65.7)	16.0 (60.8)	11.2 (52.2)	6.8 (44.2)	2.7 (36.9)	8.2 (46.8)
Daily mean °C (°F)	−2.6 (27.3)	−3.2 (26.2)	−1.4 (29.5)	2.0 (35.6)	5.6 (42.1)	9.6 (49.3)	14.1 (57.4)	16.2 (61.2)	13.5 (56.3)	8.9 (48.0)	4.5 (40.1)	0.4 (32.7)	5.7 (42.3)
Mean daily minimum °C (°F)	−5.2 (22.6)	−5.7 (21.7)	−3.7 (25.3)	−0.4 (31.3)	2.8 (37.0)	6.7 (44.1)	11.5 (52.7)	13.8 (56.8)	11.0 (51.8)	6.6 (43.9)	2.3 (36.1)	−1.9 (28.6)	3.2 (37.8)
Record low °C (°F)	−17.4 (0.7)	−18.7 (−1.7)	−18.1 (−0.6)	−9.8 (14.4)	−4.5 (23.9)	0.8 (33.4)	4.9 (40.8)	5.8 (42.4)	1.7 (35.1)	−2.6 (27.3)	−9.2 (15.4)	−14.6 (5.7)	−18.7 (−1.7)
Average precipitation mm (inches)	102.3 (4.03)	101.0 (3.98)	100.8 (3.97)	97.6 (3.84)	102.6 (4.04)	103.7 (4.08)	99.5 (3.92)	93.3 (3.67)	141.4 (5.57)	135.9 (5.35)	133.9 (5.27)	114.7 (4.52)	1,326.7 (52.23)
Average rainy days	3.03	4.07	5.17	8.83	12.87	14.60	18.50	11.27	6.33	4.13	4.70	3.53	97.03
Average snowy days	22.63	19.00	15.25	7.36	0.89	0.04	0.0	0.0	0.0	1.00	4.40	3.20	73.77
Mean monthly sunshine hours	49.6	70.2	115.5	131.9	165.8	172.6	164.8	173.5	156.1	119.0	63.0	45.4	1,427.3
Source: Météo France (Averages are for the period 1981–2010.)

== Environment ==
Seals and other wildlife can be found in the Grand Barachois lagoon of Miquelon. Every spring, whales migrating to Greenland are visible off the coasts of Miquelon and St Pierre.

Trilobite fossils have been found on Langlade. There were a number of stone pillars off the island coasts called "L'anse aux Soldats" that have been eroded away and disappeared in the 1970s.

Saint-Pierre and Miquelon (off the coast of Newfoundland)

Maritime claims:
exclusive economic zone: 200 nautical miles (370.4 km; 230.2 mi)
territorial sea: 12 nautical miles (22.2 km; 13.8 mi)

Elevation extremes:
lowest point: Atlantic Ocean 0 m
highest point: Morne de la Grande Montagne 240 m

Natural resources: fish, deepwater ports

Land use:
arable land: 13%
permanent crops: 0%
permanent pastures: 0%
forests and woodland: 4%
other: 83% (1993 est.)

Natural hazards: persistent fog throughout the year can be a maritime hazard

Environment - current issues: The fishing beds have been overfished, and may or may not recover.

Geography - note: vegetation scanty

== See also ==
- Canada–France Maritime Boundary Case
- List of airports in Saint Pierre and Miquelon
- List of cities in Saint-Pierre and Miquelon
- List of islands of Saint Pierre and Miquelon
- List of rivers of Saint Pierre and Miquelon
- Appalachian Mountains Overview
