= List of rivers of Saint Pierre and Miquelon =

This is a list of rivers of Saint Pierre and Miquelon. Rivers are listed in clockwise order, starting at the north end of each island.

== Saint Pierre Island ==
- Ruisseau Patural

== Miquelon Island ==
- Ruisseau du Chapeau
- Ruisseau de la Carcasse de l'Est
- Ruisseau de Terre Grasse
  - Ruisseau du Trou Hangar
  - Petit Ruisseau
- Ruisseau à Blondin
- Ruisseau des Godiches
- Ruisseau de la Demoiselle
- Ruisseau à Sylvain
- Ruisseau de l' Étang de la Loutre
- Ruisseau du Nordet
- Ruisseau du Milieu
- Ruisseau de la Presqu'île
- Ruisseau de la Mère Durand
- Ruisseau de la Pointe au Cheval
- Ruisseau Creux
- Ruisseau du Renard
- Ruisseau de la Carcasse
  - Ruisseau du Foin au Curé
  - Ruisseau du Foin à Raymond
  - Ruisseau du Foin à Bancal
- Ruisseau des Eperlans
- Ruisseau du Petit Cap

=== Le Cap ===
- Ruisseau des Cosies
- Ruisseau Tabaron
- Ruisseau de l' Anse

== Langlade Island ==
- Belle Rivière
  - Ruisseau des Mats
  - Fourche Droite Ruisseau
  - Fourche Gauche Ruisseau
- Ruisseau de l’Anse aux Soldats
- Ruisseau de l’Anse
- Ruisseau du Trou à la Baleine
- Ruisseau du Cap aux Voleurs
- Dolisie Ruisseau
  - Le Canal Noir
- Deuxième Ruisseau Maquine
- Premier Ruisseau Maquine
  - Ruisseau de la Cascade
- Ruisseau Clotaire
- Ruisseau Dupont
- Ruisseau de Cap Sauveur
- Ruisseau de l' Ouest
- Ruisseau Debons
  - Ruisseau Mouton
- Ruisseau de la Goélette
