= 2000 Saint Pierre and Miquelon legislative election =

Legislative elections for the Territorial Council were held in Saint Pierre and Miquelon on 19 March 2000. A second round of voting was held in the Saint Pierre constituency on 26 March. They were won by the Defence of the Interests of the Archipeligo, which took 11 of the 19 seats.

== Results ==
Party	First round			Second round			Total seats
Party	Votes	%	Seats	Votes	%	Seats	Total seats
Defence of the Interests of the Archipeligo	1,267	37.45	0	1,524	45.90	11	11
Road to the Future	868	25.66	0	838	25.24	2	2
Experience and Innovation	868	25.66	0	958	28.86	2	2
Volonté Insulaire	173	5.11	3				3
Miquelon 2000	150	4.43	1				1
Rally of French Taxpayers	57	1.68	0				0
Total	3,383	100.00	4	3,320	100.00	15	19
Valid votes	3,383	93.97		3,320	97.68		
Invalid/blank votes	217	6.03		79	2.32		
Total votes	3,600	100.00		3,399	100.00		
Registered voters/turnout	4,606	78.16		4,100	82.90		
Source: Recueil
