= Pointe aux Cannon Battery =

Artillery battery in St. Pierre, St. Pierre and Miquelon

Pointe aux Canons Battery
- Saint Pierre Island, Saint Pierre and Miquelon
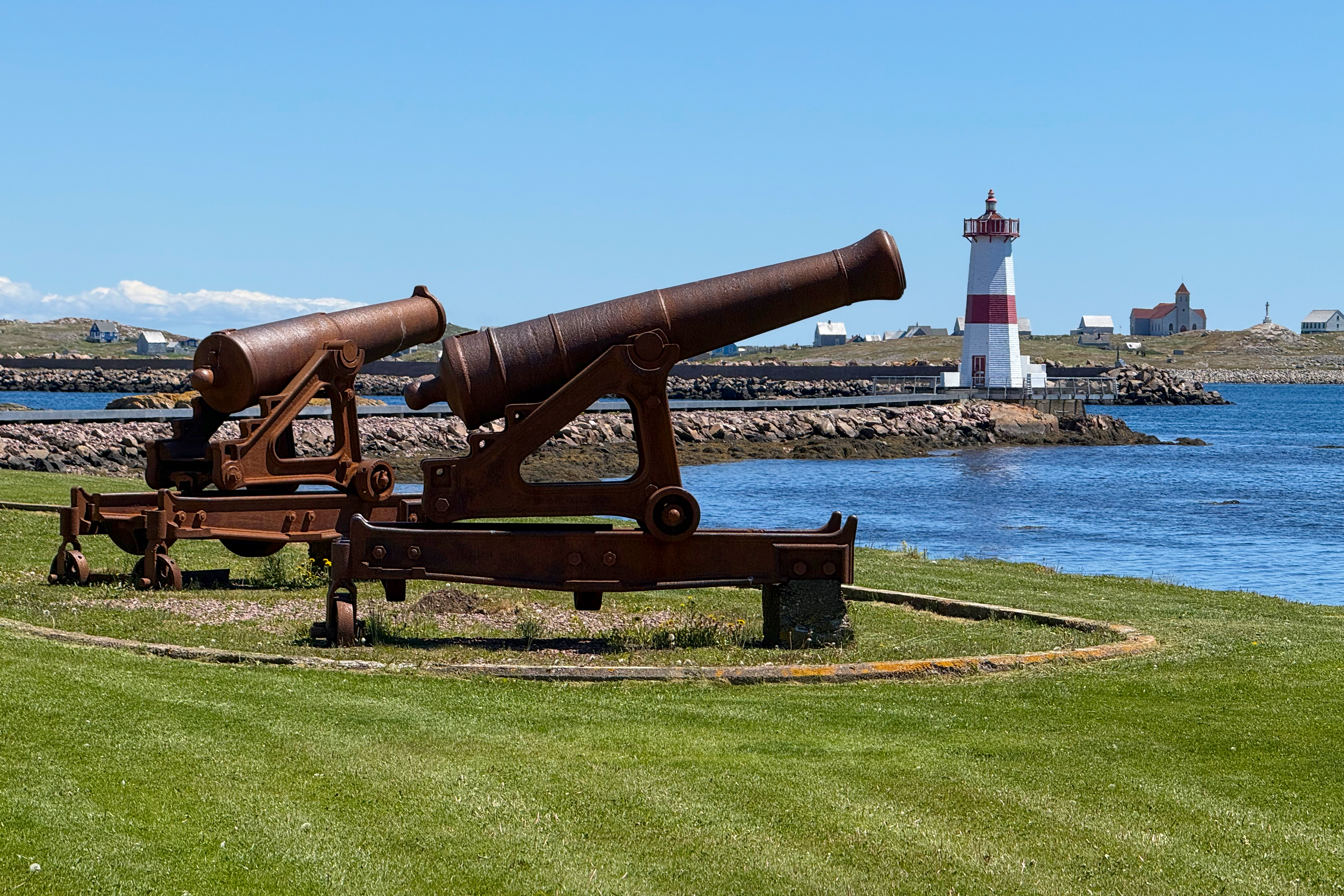
- Cannons at the fort in 2026

Site information
- Type: Fort
- Open to the public: Yes

Location
- Coordinates: 46.775163566°N 56.16833266°W

The Pointe aux Canons Battery (Batterie de la Pointe aux Canons) was a historic fort located on the island of Saint Pierre in the French territorial collectivity of Saint Pierre and Miquelon. It was built by the French to defend the islands from the British attacks in the late 17th century. It was destroyed by the British in 1702 CE, and was rebuilt later by the French in 1792. In the 19th century, a modern battery was established at the site as a precautionary measure during the Crimean War, but was never used in battle.

== History ==
French settlement in Saint Pierre began in 1670, with a small chapel built in 1689 and a military post was added in 1690. The military outpost at Saint Pierre, was developed into a fortified battery to defend the harbour against British raids during the reign of King William III (1689–1697) and Queen Anne (1702–1712) later. During the period, there were at least five British attacks on the islands and the six-gun battery was attacked and destroyed by the British in 1702 CE. While the fort was rebuilt, the French abandoned the settlement in 1708.

The Treaty of Utrecht of 1713 brought the Anglo-French wars to an end, with France ceding possession of Saint Pierre and Miquelon to Britain. While the British took formal possession of the island in 1714, and there is no information on the fort during the British occupation. The islands were subsequently returned to France by the Treaty of Paris in 1763 after the end of the Seven Years' War. The French planned to upgrade the defence for the harbour in 1784, but never carried it out. The fort was redeveloped by the French in 1792, and in May 1793, during the War of the First Coalition, a British force under Captain William Affleck captured the French garrison.

In the 19th century, a modern battery was established at the site as a precautionary measure during the Crimean War (1853–1856), replacing the older fort that had previously occupied the site.

== Location and display ==
The fort is situated near the Pointe aux Canons Lighthouse in the island. The site has four guns on iron carriages put on display to the public, while a 19th-century cannon is displayed next to the lighthouse. The cannons have never been used in active defence, and they are fired only to mark special events.
