= Geology of Saint Pierre and Miquelon =

The geology of Saint Pierre and Miquelon is part of the 680 to 550 million year old, late Proterozoic Avalon Zone, a part of the Canadian Appalachians. The oldest rocks are 615 million year old metasedimentary and metavolcanic rocks, intruded by diorite and trondhjemite in the Cap de Miquelon Group. The metamorphic rocks are descended from an earlier volcanic arc-marine platform, rather than more ancient basement rock from the Avalonia microcontinent. The St. Pierre Group formed 581 million years ago with felsic and pyroclastic flows. Together with mafic rocks and andesite, they are evidence of back arc environment. The late Neoproterozoic Belle-Riviere Group includes bimodal volcanic rocks such as basalt and rhyolite overlain by terrestrial sedimentary rock. Belle-Riviere Group rocks partially overlie the Tommotian Fortune Group and the early and middle Cambrian Langlade Group, which have fossiliferous limestone beds and siltstone. Discordant contact between older Precambrian rocks and Paleozoic sedimentary rocks as well as thrust faults indicate Acadian orogeny related deformation.

In the Mesozoic, the Orpheus Graben opened, widening into the St. Pierre Block and filled with thick sediments in the Jurassic, Cretaceous and Paleogene. Estimates in 1992 suggested 250 billion cubic meters of natural gas and up to 700 million barrels of oil. Analysis of glacial till suggests that the islands were covered by ice sheets from Newfoundland in the Pleistocene with the islands displaying marine edge deposits.
