= Belle River (Saint Pierre and Miquelon) =

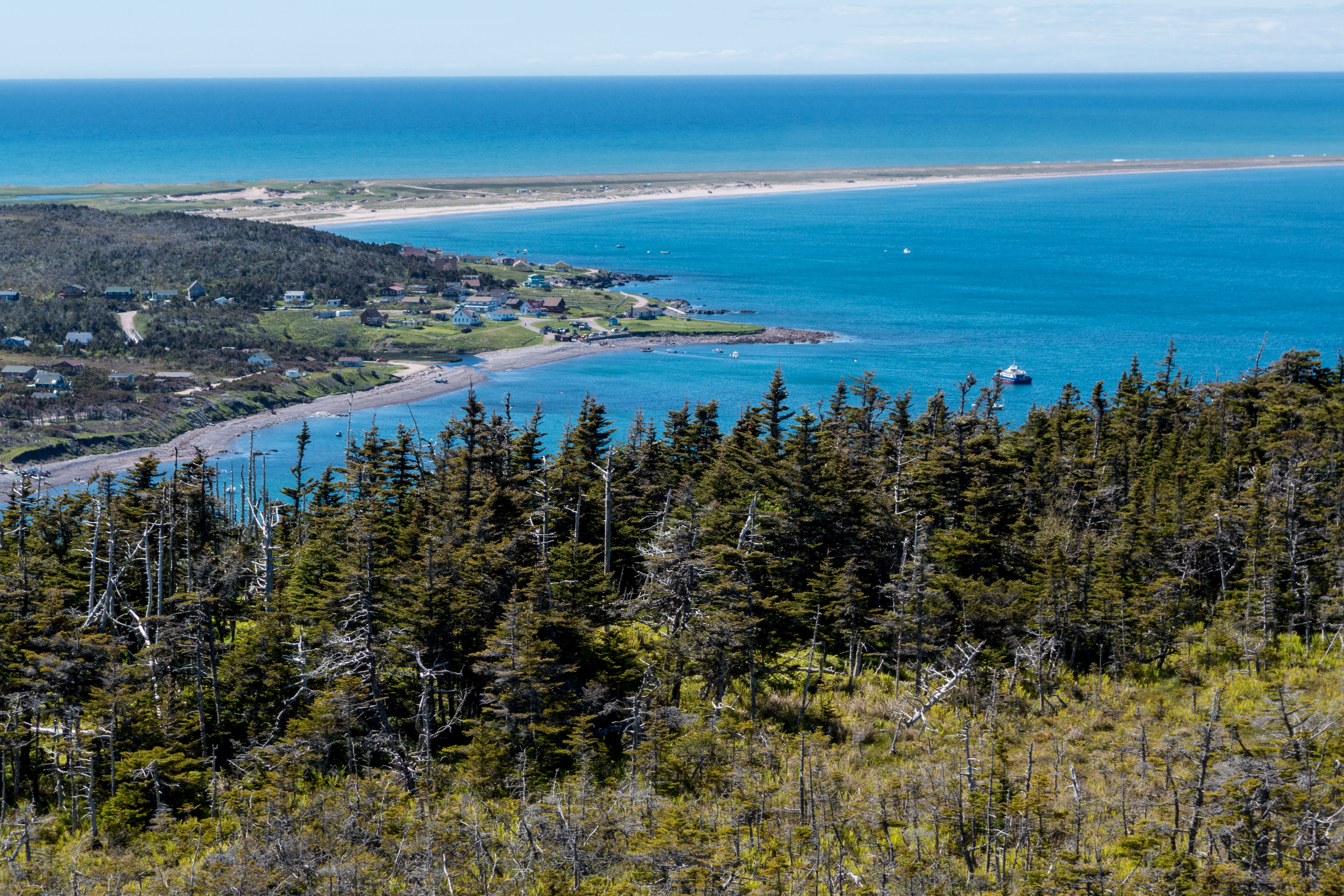
- The community of Anse du Gouverneur, with the mouth of the Belle River visible

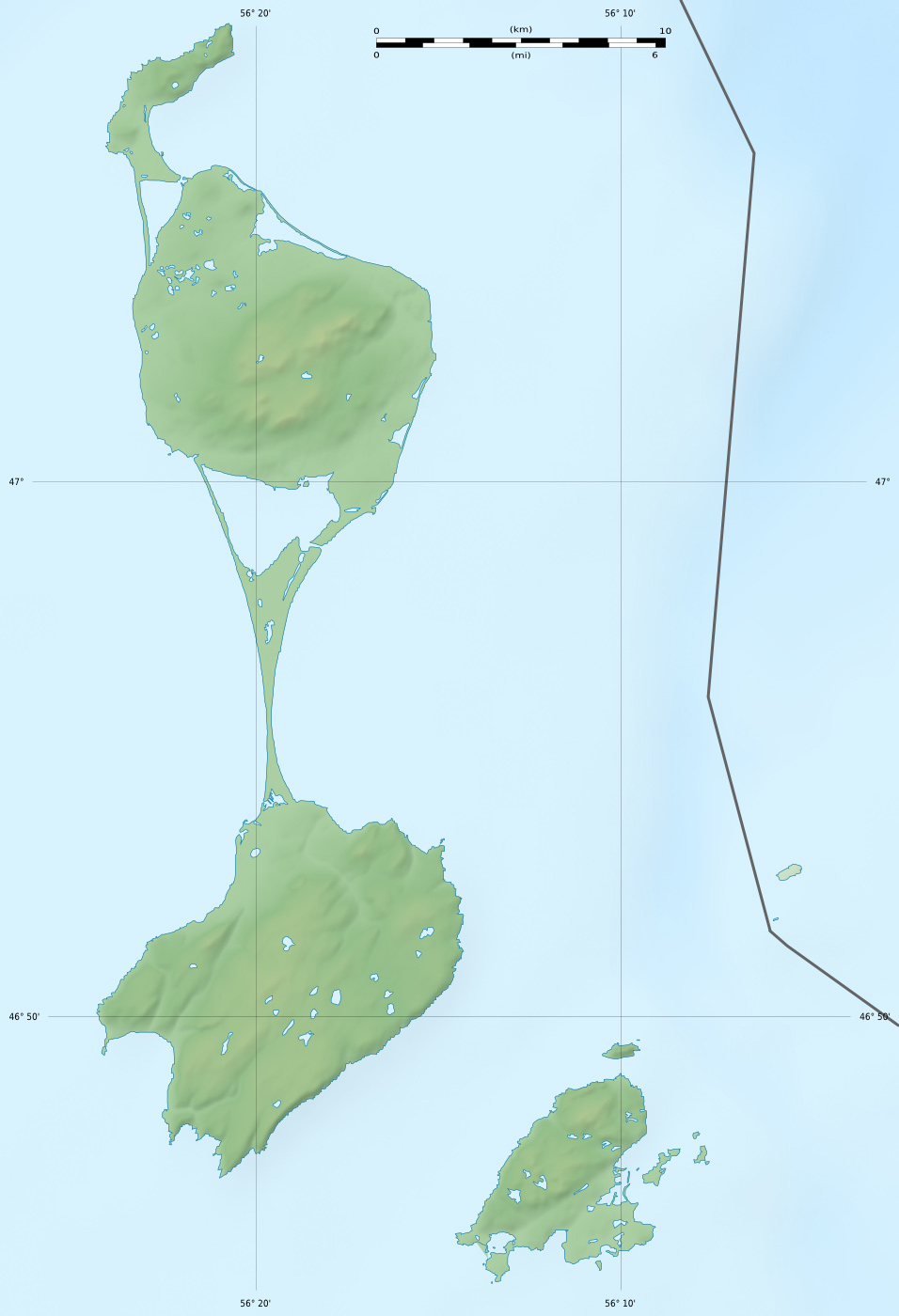
- Location of mouth

Location
- Country: France
- Territory: Saint Pierre and Miquelon

Physical characteristics
- Mouth
  - coordinates: 46°53′48″N 56°17′58″W

The Belle River is the largest river in the French overseas collectivity of Saint Pierre and Miquelon. The river flows through the archipelago's largest island of Miquelon-Langlade, which is formed by a thin strip of land called a tombolo that connects the northern and southern "islands" of Miquelon and Langlade, respectively. The river is fed by several streams and ponds on Langlade, and flows northwest for the majority of its length. The river's course turns northeast shortly before emptying into the sea on the eastern side of the island in the community of Anse du Gouverneur.
