= List of people from Saint Pierre and Miquelon =

This is a list of famous or notable people from the Saint Pierre et Miquelon

== Authors ==
- Françoise Enguehard

== Motion picture and television personalities ==
- Julien Kang – television actor and model

== Political and military figures ==
- George Alain Frecker – politician and academic administrator.
- Henry Hughes Hough – Rear Admiral of the United States Navy and one-time military Governor of the United States Virgin Islands

== Singers and musicians ==
- Alexandra Hernandez
- Paula Nenette Pepin – composer, pianist and lyricist

== Sportspeople ==
- Nicolas Arrossamena – professional ice hockey forward who plays for Anglet Hormadi Élite of the Ligue Magnus.
- Valentin Claireaux – ice hockey player for PSG Zlín and the French national team.
- Patrick Foliot – former ice hockey goaltender
- Denis Kang – professional mixed martial artist
