= Atlantic Jet =

Passenger ferry

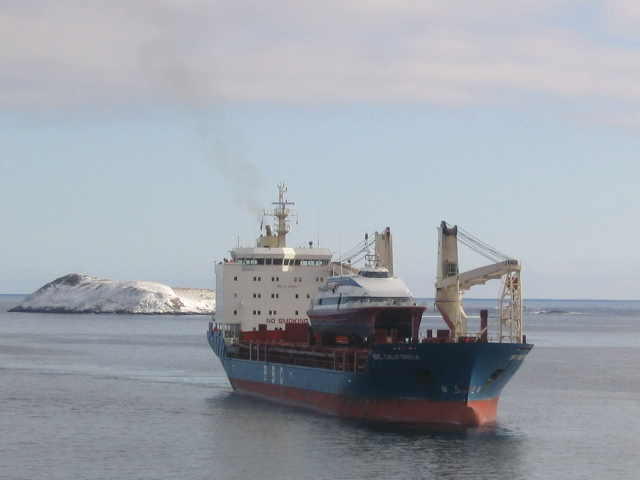
The fast catamaran arrives from Norway, 1 February 2005

Atlantic Jet was a passenger ferry service which operated between Fortune, Newfoundland, Canada and St. Pierre and Miquelon, an overseas collectivity of France. The service was operated by SPM Express SA, and used a high speed catamaran. The service was discontinued in 2009 due to an engine problem and was replaced by a traditional passenger-only ferry, the MV Arethusa.
