= List of cities in Saint-Pierre and Miquelon =

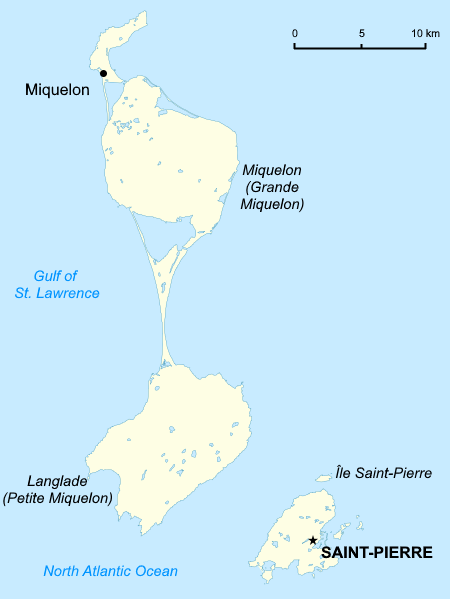
Miquelon on the left and Saint-Pierre on the right

This is a list of cities in Saint-Pierre and Miquelon. The communes are:

- Miquelon-Langlade
- Saint-Pierre

Historically L'Île-aux-Marins was a separate commune up until 1945 when it was annexed into the commune of Saint-Pierre.

Within each commune there are settlements:

- Miquelon, Miquelon-Langlade
- Saint-Pierre, Saint-Pierre
