= List of mammals of Saint Pierre and Miquelon =

This is a list of the mammal species recorded in Saint Pierre and Miquelon. There are two mammal species in Saint Pierre and Miquelon, both of which are dolphins. There is inadequate information to make an assessment of the risks to either species.

== Order: Cetacea (whales) ==
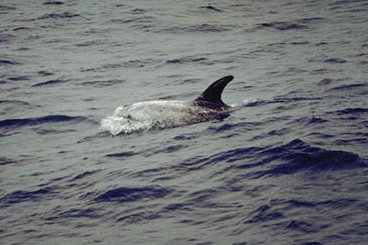
Risso's dolphin

The order Cetacea includes whales, dolphins and porpoises. They are the mammals most fully adapted to aquatic life with a spindle-shaped nearly hairless body, protected by a thick layer of blubber, and forelimbs and tail modified to provide propulsion underwater.

- Suborder: Odontoceti
  - Superfamily: Platanistoidea
    - Family: Delphinidae (marine dolphins)
        - Genus: Lagenodelphis
          - Fraser's dolphin, L. hosei DD
        - Genus: Grampus
          - Risso's dolphin, G. griseus DD

== See also ==
- List of chordate orders
- Lists of mammals by region
- List of prehistoric mammals
- Mammal classification
- List of mammals described in the 2000s
