= Langlade (island) =

Langlade Island
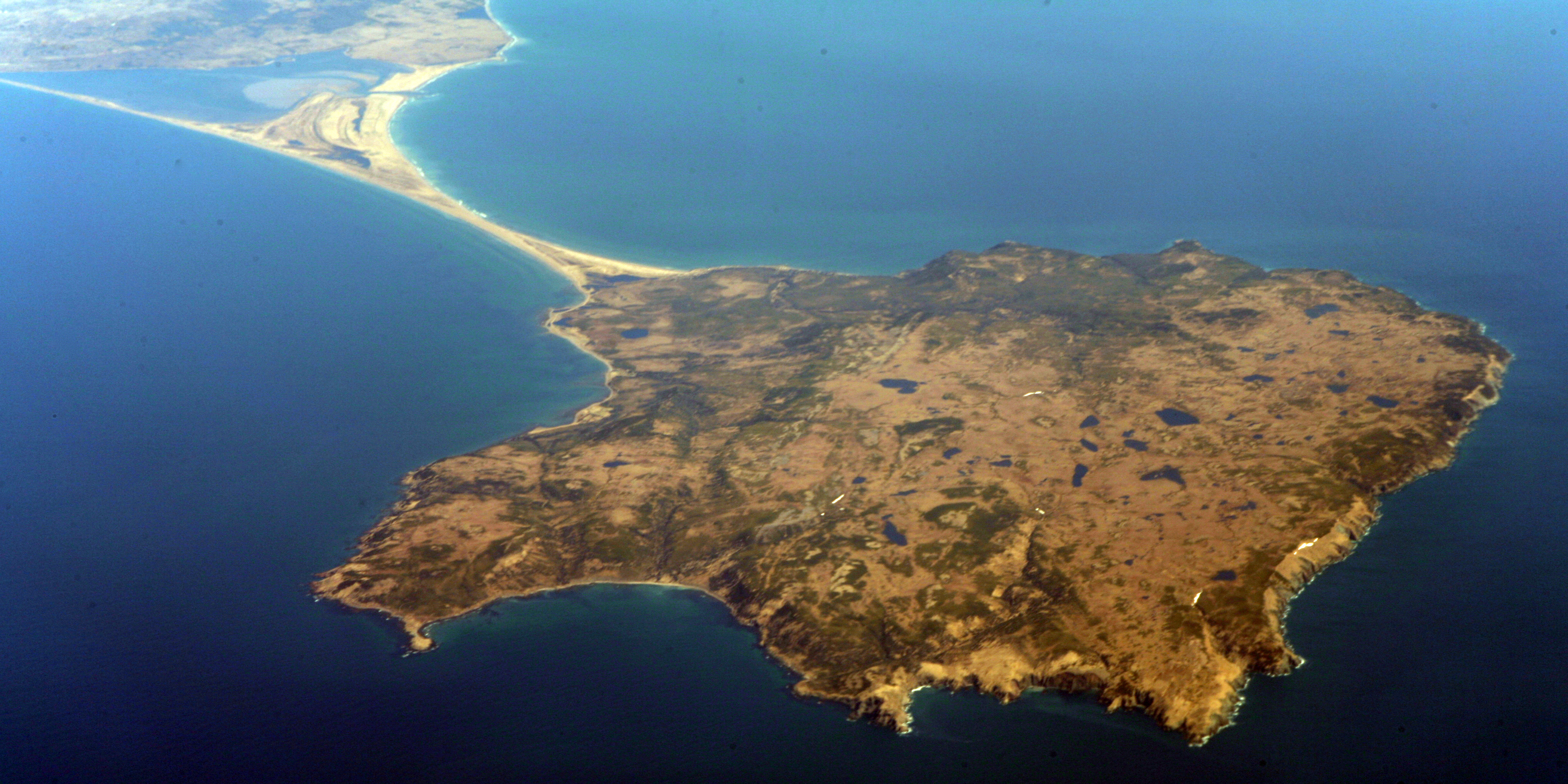
- Langlade

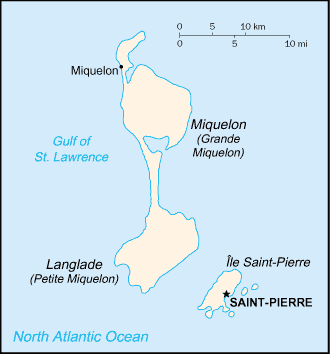

Geography
- Location: North Atlantic Ocean
- Coordinates: 46°51′N 56°19′W
- Archipelago: Saint Pierre and Miquelon
- Area: 91 km^{2} (35 sq mi)

Administration
- France
- Municipality: Miquelon-Langlade

Langlade Island, also referred to as "Little Miquelon", is an island of the French overseas collectivity of Saint-Pierre and Miquelon. It forms the southern part of the commune of Miquelon-Langlade. It lies to the west of Newfoundland in the North Atlantic Ocean. It is attached to the Miquelon Island by the isthmus of La Dune. The island does not have a permanent population since the passing of its last resident in 2006, but around 1000 visitors arrive every summer as it serves as a seasonal retreat.

== Geography ==
Langlade Island forms the southern part of the commune of Miquelon-Langlade in the French overseas collectivity of Saint-Pierre and Miquelon. It lies to the west of Newfoundland's Burin Peninsula in the North Atlantic Ocean and covers a land area of 91 km^{2} (35 sq mi). It is attached to the Miquelon Island by the sandy isthmus of La Dune, which was formed by the coastal currents in the 18th century. Located about 3 mi (4.8 km) west of Saint Pierre Island, Langlade is an ancient peneplain drained by numerous short rivers, including the Belle, the largest, which flows to the northwest. The coast of Langlade is lined with steep cliffs, except to the northwest. It is home to substantial wildlife, including grey and harbour seals, white tailed deer, horned lark, savannah sparrow, piping plover, and migratory shorebirds.

== Demographics and infrastructure ==
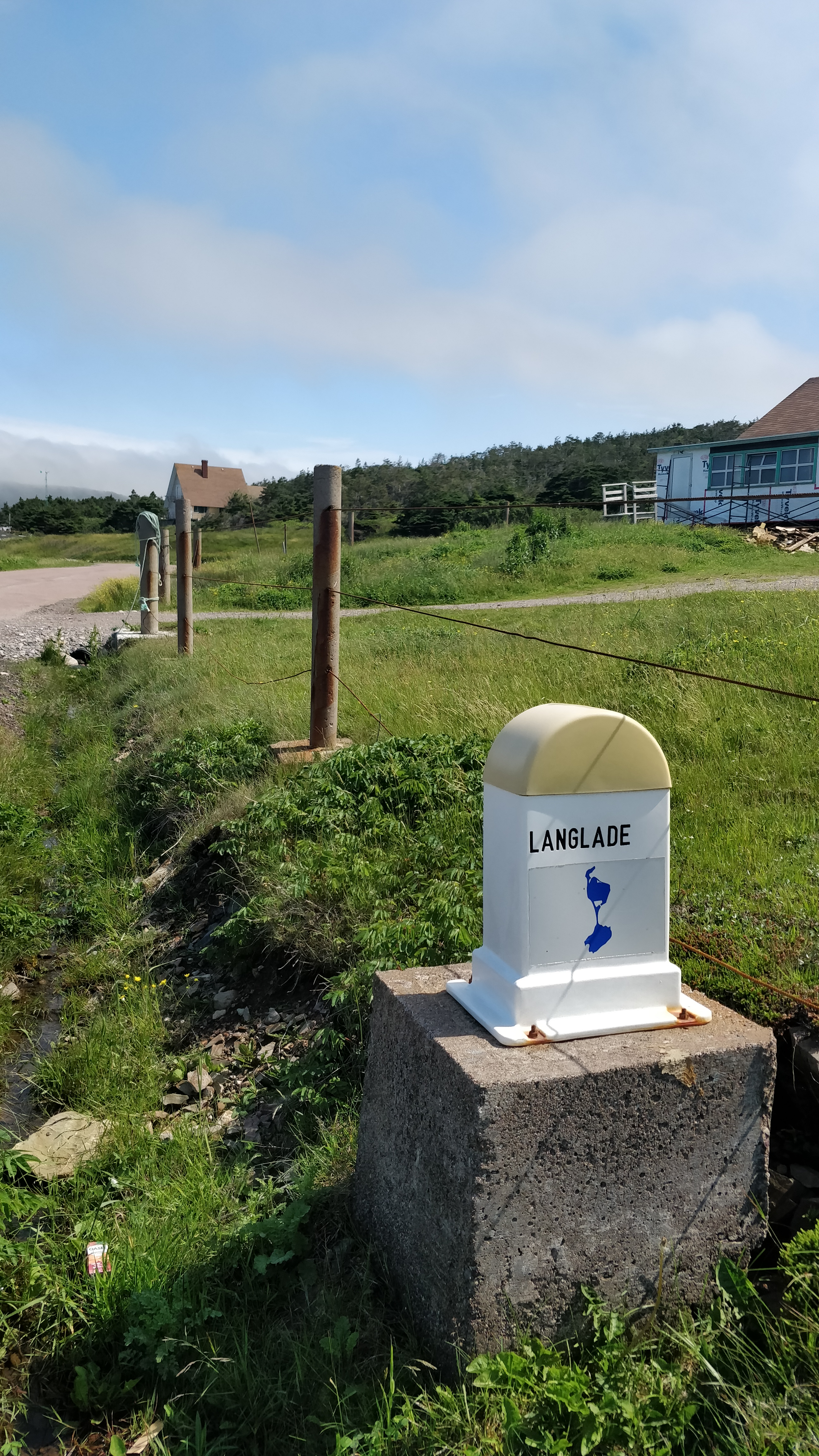
The road into Langlade from La Dune

The economy is based on seasonal tourism and nature-based recreation. The island is uninhabited in winter and receives seasonal visitors each summer. Seasonal facilities include a bar, a ferry station, a grocery store, a health care point, a restaurant, a Roman Catholic chapel, and a summer camp in the island. Langlade's only year-round inhabitant, Charles Lafitte, died in 2006, having lived there as a hermit for many years with his dogs.
