= Miquelon-Langlade =

Islands and commune in Saint Pierre and Miquelon

- Commune
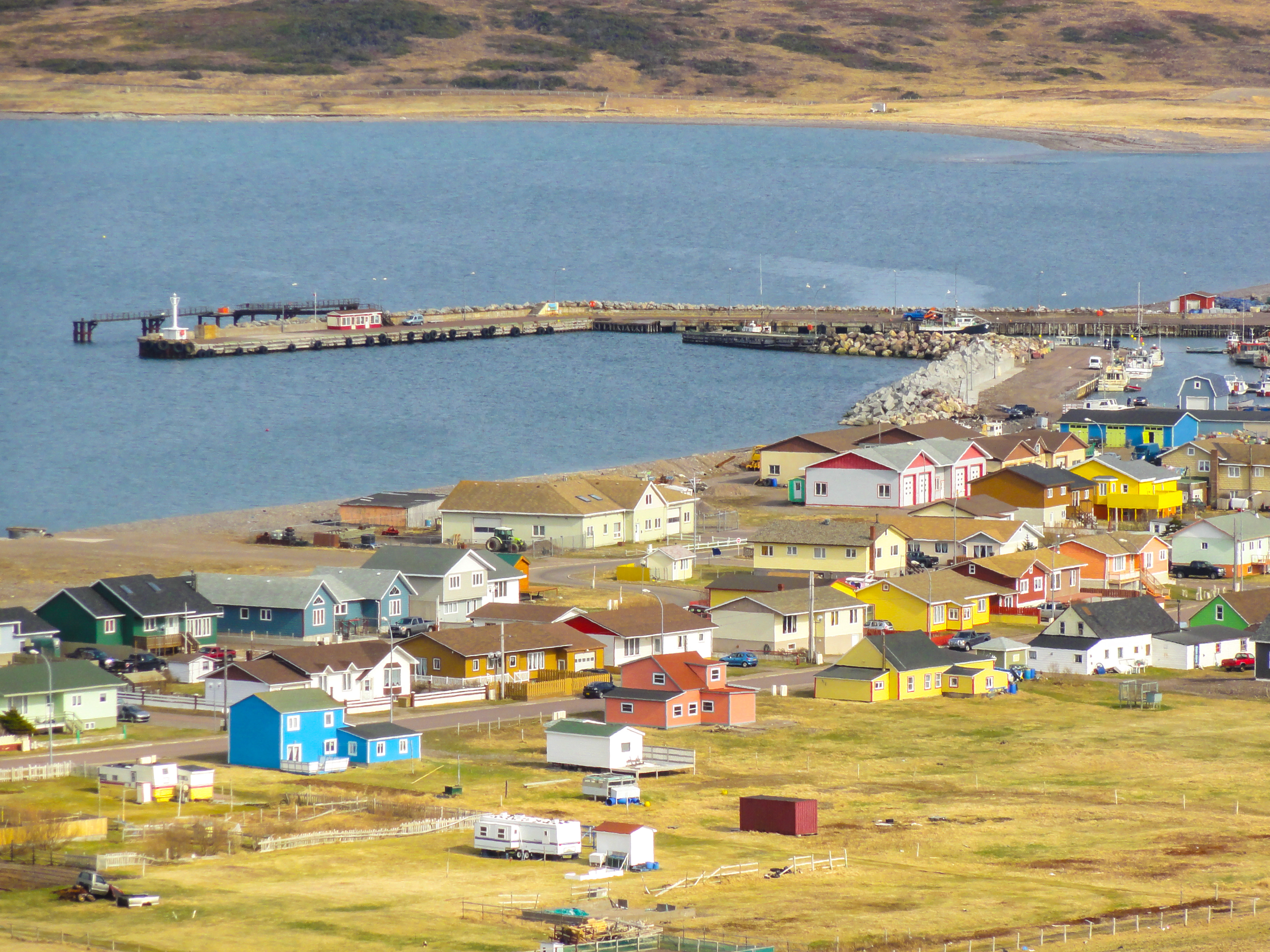
- Miquelon village

- Flag Coat of arms

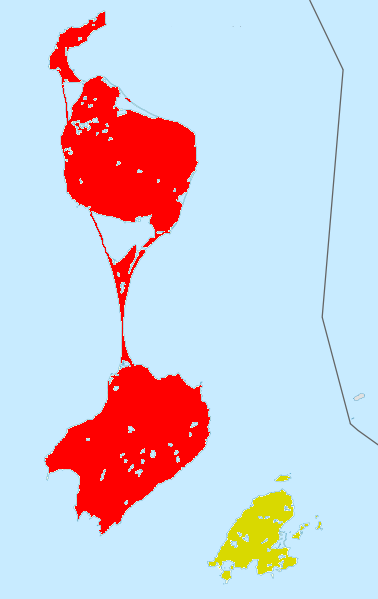
- Location of the commune (in red) within Saint Pierre and Miquelon
- Location of Miquelon-Langlade
- Coordinates: 47°06′00″N 56°22′45″W
- Country: France
- Overseas collectivity: Saint Pierre and Miquelon

Government
  - Mayor (2020–2026): Franck Detcheverry
- Area^{1}: 205 km^{2} (79 sq mi)
- Highest elevation: 240 m (790 ft)
- Lowest elevation: 0 m (0 ft)
- Population (2022): 596
  - Density: 2.91/km^{2} (7.53/sq mi)
- Time zone: UTC−03:00
  - Summer (DST): UTC−02:00
- INSEE/Postal code: 97501 /97500
- Website: http://mairiedemiquelonlanglade.fr/
- ^{1} French Land Register data, which excludes lakes, ponds, glaciers > 1 km^{2} (0.386 sq mi or 247 acres) and river estuaries.

Miquelon–Langlade
Native name: Miquelon–Langlade
- Interactive map of Miquelon–Langlade

Geography
- Location: Atlantic Ocean
- Archipelago: Saint Pierre and Miquelon
- Adjacent to: Gulf of Saint Lawrence
- Area: 110 km^{2} (42 sq mi)
- Highest point: Morne de la Grande Montagne (240 m (790 ft))

Administration
- France
- Overseas collectivity: Saint Pierre and Miquelon
- Largest Commune: Miquelon-Langlade

Demographics
- Demonym: Miquelonnais(e)(s)
- Population: 626 (2012)
- Pop. density: 5.69/km^{2} (14.74/sq mi)
- Languages: French

Miquelon-Langlade (French pronunciation: [miklɔ̃ lɑ̃ɡlad]) is the larger but less populated of the two communes (municipalities) making up the French overseas collectivity of Saint Pierre and Miquelon, located 22 km (14 mi) to the south of Newfoundland in the Gulf of St. Lawrence. It consists of three islands: Miquelon (also called Grande Miquelon), Langlade (Petite Miquelon) and Le Cap, connected by narrow tombolos (sandy isthmi). The communal seat is the settlement of Miquelon, on the northern tip, where the island's entire permanent population of 596 (as of 2022) is located. Miquelon Airport provides flights to nearby Saint-Pierre Airport.

== Names and etymology ==
The name Miquelon purportedly derived from a Basque nickname for "Michael" (Mikel). In 1579, the names Micquetõ and Micquelle appeared for the first time in French Basque mariner Martin de Hoyarçabal's maritime pilot. The name evolved over time into Miclon, Micklon, and finally Miquelon (Mikelune in Basque).

The residents are known as Miquelonnais(e)(s).

== Geography ==
Located in the Gulf of St. Lawrence, west of Newfoundland's Burin Peninsula, Miquelon-Langlade covers a total land area of 205 km^{2} (79 sq mi). It comprises three islands connected by tombolos: Le Cap in the north, Miquelon (Grand Miquelon) in the center, and Langlade (Petite Miquelon) in the south.

A tombolo sandspit called La Dune connects Miquelon and Langlade; it formed in the 18th century and is 12 km (7.5 mi) long and 6 to 100 m (20 to 328 ft) wide. In the eighteenth century it was still possible to sail a boat between Miquelon and Langlade, but by the end of that century La Dune had closed in to form an isthmus between the islands.

The tombolo connecting Miquelon and Le Cap is 3 km (1.9 mi) long and in places less than 100 m (330 ft) wide.

The island of Saint Pierre is across a treacherous and foggy 6 km (3.7 mi) strait that fishermen named "The Mouth of Hell" (French: La Gueule de L'Enfer) that has been the site of more than 600 shipwrecks.

=== Miquelon ===
Miquelon's coastline includes numerous sand and pebble beaches enclosing lagoons, as well as high rocky cliffs standing up to 25 m (82 ft) on the east coast. Its geology consists of slightly metamorphosed post-Ordovician volcanic rocks, mainly rhyolites with breccias, andesites and basalts. On the south of the Miquelon Island is the Grand Barachois, a large lagoon which is host to a large population of seals and other wildlife. Miquelon is also a well known destination for bird watching.

=== Langlade ===
Located at 3 mi (4.8 km) west of Saint Pierre Island, Langlade is an ancient peneplain drained by numerous short rivers, including the Belle, the largest, which flows to the northwest. The coast of Langlade is lined with steep cliffs, except to the northwest.

== Climate ==
The climate is typical of the North Atlantic and the Labrador Current, with frequent storms and winds that exceed 60 km/h (37 mph) for nearly six months of the year. The summers are cool and foggy. The average annual temperature is 5.5 °C (41.9 °F). Köppen–Geiger climate classification system classifies its climate as sub-Arctic (Dfc). Summers are mild while winters are cold. It receives precipitation all year.

Climate data for Miquelon-Langlade
Month	Jan	Feb	Mar	Apr	May	Jun	Jul	Aug	Sep	Oct	Nov	Dec	Year
Mean daily maximum °C (°F)	−0.1 (31.8)	−0.6 (30.9)	1.5 (34.7)	5.3 (41.5)	9.7 (49.5)	13.7 (56.7)	17.9 (64.2)	19.3 (66.7)	16.5 (61.7)	11.5 (52.7)	7.1 (44.8)	2.2 (36.0)	8.7 (47.6)
Daily mean °C (°F)	−3.5 (25.7)	−4.2 (24.4)	−1.7 (28.9)	2 (36)	5.7 (42.3)	9.6 (49.3)	13.9 (57.0)	15.4 (59.7)	12.5 (54.5)	7.8 (46.0)	4 (39)	−0.8 (30.6)	5.1 (41.1)
Mean daily minimum °C (°F)	−6.8 (19.8)	−7.7 (18.1)	−4.9 (23.2)	−1.2 (29.8)	1.8 (35.2)	5.6 (42.1)	10 (50)	11.6 (52.9)	8.5 (47.3)	4.1 (39.4)	0.9 (33.6)	−3.8 (25.2)	1.5 (34.7)
Average precipitation mm (inches)	124 (4.9)	106 (4.2)	101 (4.0)	102 (4.0)	101 (4.0)	105 (4.1)	98 (3.9)	109 (4.3)	118 (4.6)	137 (5.4)	137 (5.4)	132 (5.2)	1,370 (54)
Average rainy days (≥ 1 mm)	8	6	5	6	7	6	7	5	6	9	9	10	84
Source 1: Climate-Data.org (altitude: 1m)
Source 2: Storm247.com for rainy days

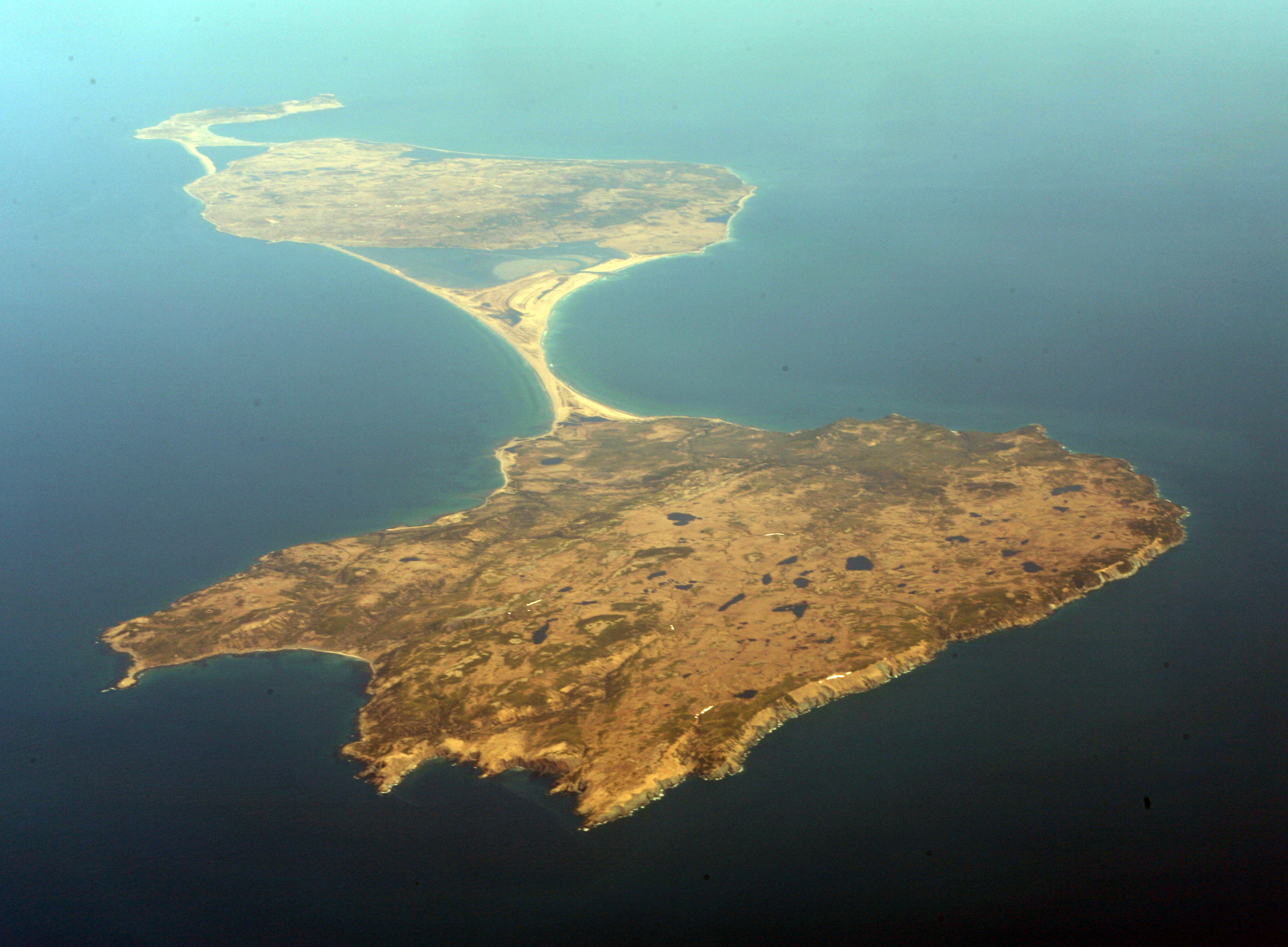
Miquelon Island at centre, south of Le Cap and north of Langlade Island

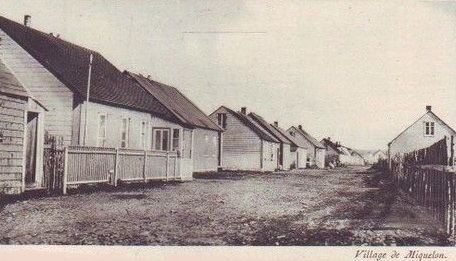
The village of Miquelon c. 1930

== Demographics ==
Miquelon-Langlade consists of the commune (also called Miquelon-Langlade), with a population of 596 in 2022. The majority of the residents live in the village of Miquelon, located in the north of the island near Le Cap, north of a shallow lagoon (barachois) and has a small harbour protected with constructed breakwaters along the eastern side of the isthmus.

On the northern coast of Langlade, there are settlements at the coves of Anse du Gouvernement, Anse aux Soldats and Le Ruisseau Debons, consisting mainly of holiday cottages.

The population of Miquelon-Langlade is mainly of Basque and Acadian ancestry.

== Transportation ==
Miquelon Airport is located adjacent to Miquelon village; Air Saint-Pierre operates regularly scheduled daily flights to Saint-Pierre Airport.

SPM Ferries provides service to and from Saint Pierre town from both Miquelon village and Anse du Gouvernement on Langlade. SPM also connects Miquelon town directly with Fortune, Newfoundland, Canada, once or twice weekly. A ferry service connects Miquelon town with Anse du Gouvernement on Langlade in summer months.

The main asphalt road runs from the capital along the western coast of Miquelon, across the Langlade tombolo and ending in Le Ruisseau Debons on Langlade.

== Facilities ==
At Miquelon village facilities include (as of 2024):

- The Centre Médical de Miquelon (basic medical care; more advanced services are available in Saint-Pierre and St. John's)
- Football (soccer) pitch Stade de l'Avenir ("stadium of the future") of the Association Sportive Miquelonnaise (Miquelon sports association)
- Police, fire and ferry stations, library, post office, public restrooms, tourist information office
- Government offices: mairie, prefecture, and délégation territoriale

=== Schools ===
- Ecole du socle de Miquelon, which houses: As of the 2014–2015 school year the junior high school had 25 students.
  - The private contracted nursery school/preschool Soeur Hilarion
  - Public elementary school Les Quatre Temps
  - Public junior high school Collège de Miquelon

The government high school/sixth-form programmes serving Miquelon are at Lycée-Collège d'État Émile Letournel on Saint-Pierre island.

=== Museums and activities ===
The Maison de la Nature et de L'Environnement ("Nature and Environment Center") provides self-guided tours of both the Cormorandière Valley and of the whole island. It hosts the art/craft vendor Art passion. Its Centre d'interprétation ("interpretation centre") features exhibits on geography, climate, biodiversity, and history through and interactive permanent axibilts that leads visitors through nature habitats.

The Musée de Miquelon ("museum of Miquelon") explains the origin of the island's people, including objects, customs and activities.

In summer, Saveurs Fermières ("farm flavours"), a goat farm, teaches about goats and cheesemaking, and offers tastings of local farm products.

There are numerous hiking routes: Le Chemin des Boeufs, Pointe Plate, Les Buttes dégarnies et la Grand Barachois, Belliveau, Le Cap de Miquelon, La Tête Pelé, and Les Trois Sapins. There is a nature observatory, Observatoire du Grand Barachois, and several camping areas.

=== At Anse du Gouvernement ===
At Anse du Gouvernement on Langlade as of 2024, there is a bar, ferry station, grocery store, health care point, public restroom and restaurant, as well as the Sainte-Thérèse Roman Catholic chapel and the Centre de vacances de Langlade summer camp.

== Landmarks ==
- Ampersand (&) sculpture

== Festivals and events ==
- Les 25 km de Miquelon ("the 25 km of Miquelon") half marathon race
- Bastille Day celebration with games, food, fireworks and dancing
- Le Festival des Produits de Mer (Seafood Festival)
- Le Dunefest music festival

== Gallery ==
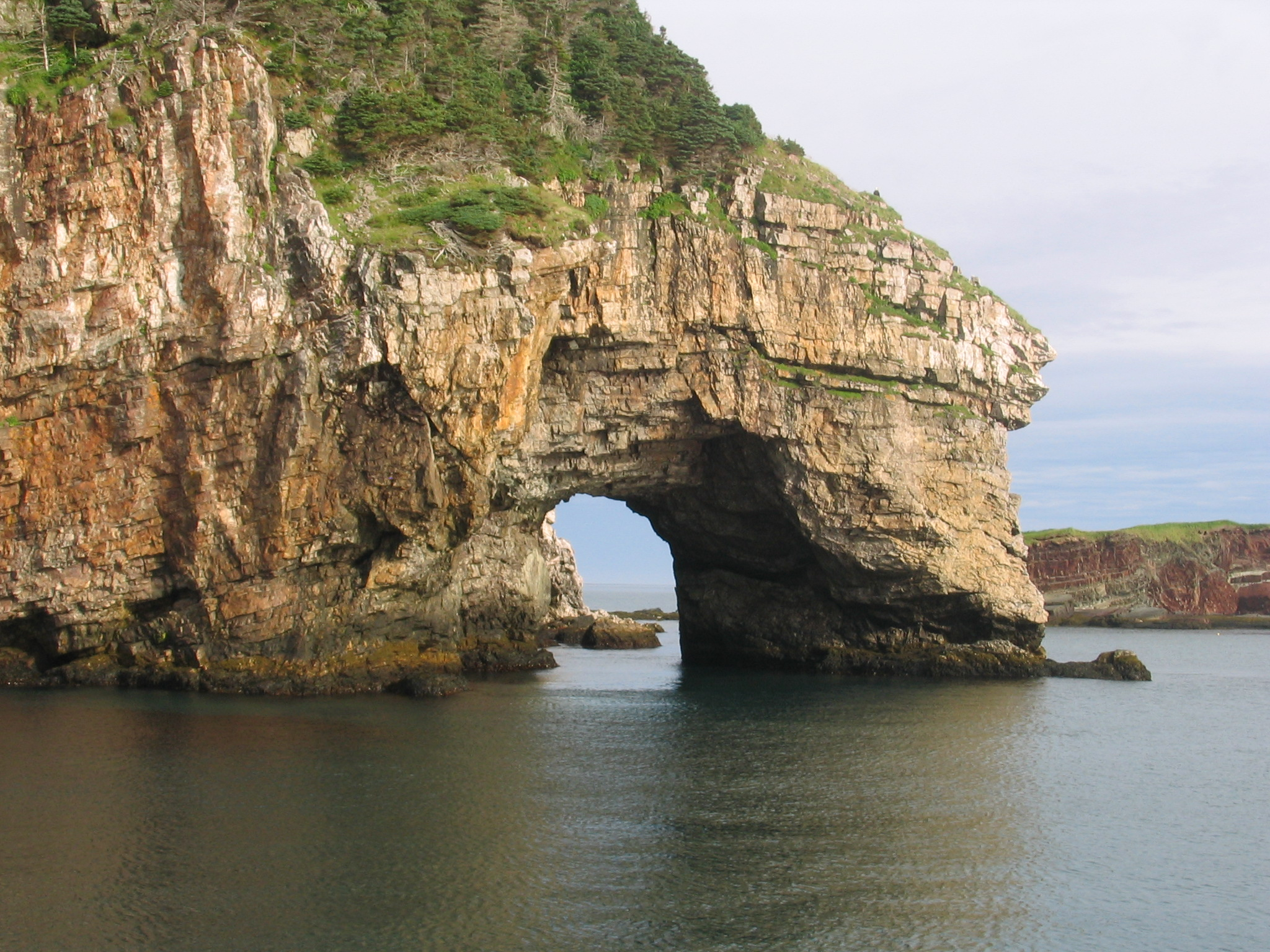
Miquelon shore

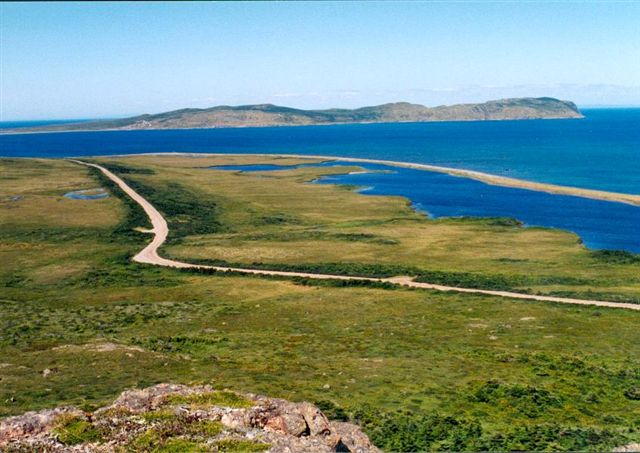
The north coast of Miquelon, next to Le Cap

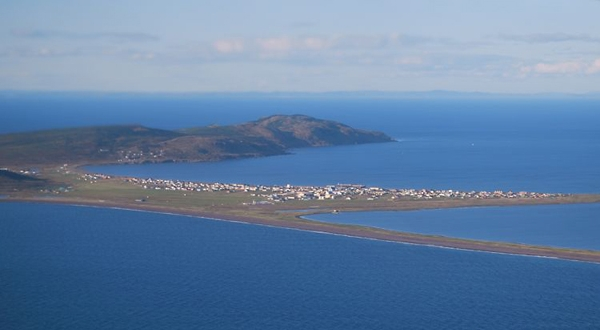
The village of Miquelon seen from the west

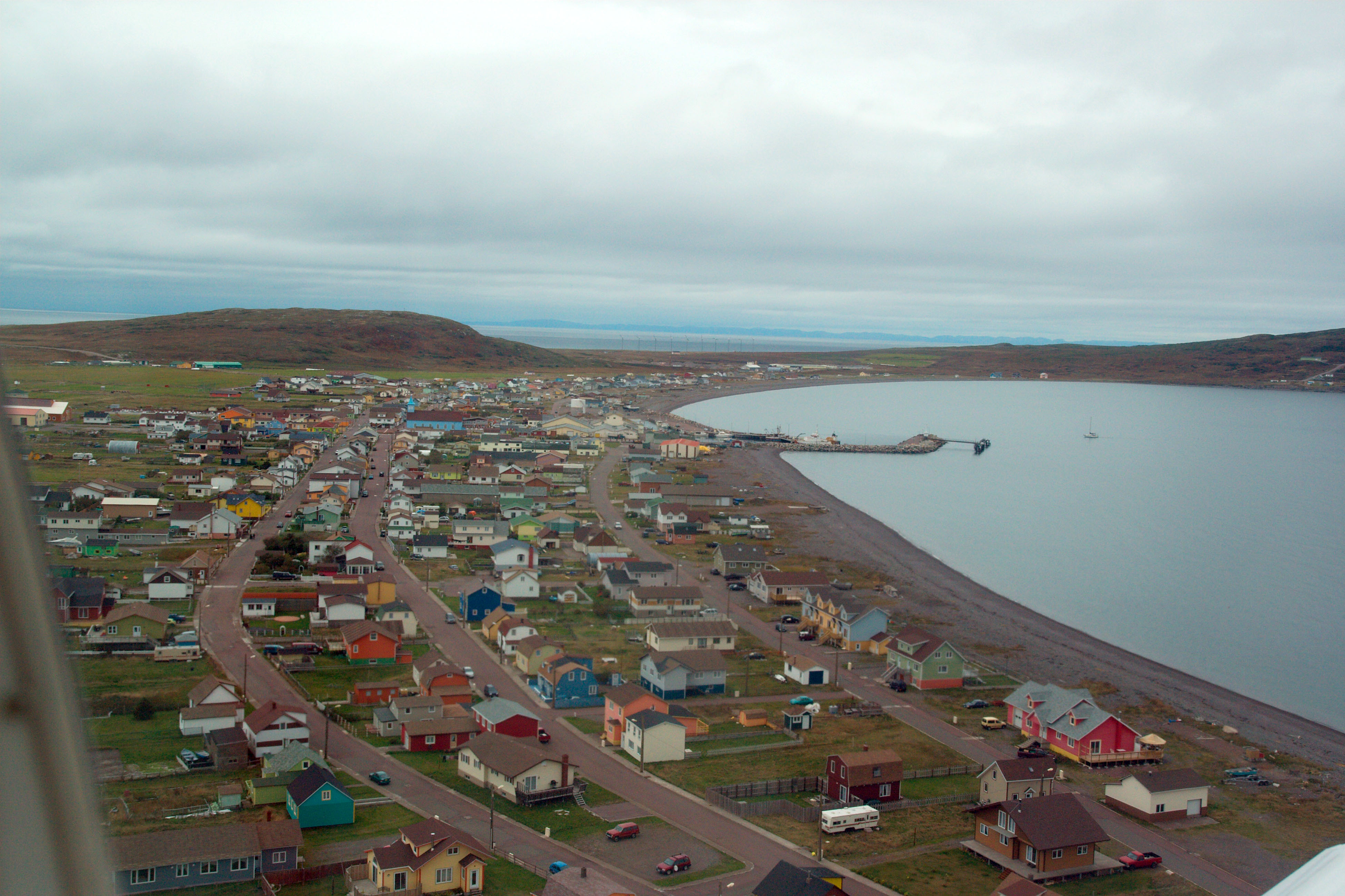
Aerial view of Miquelon village

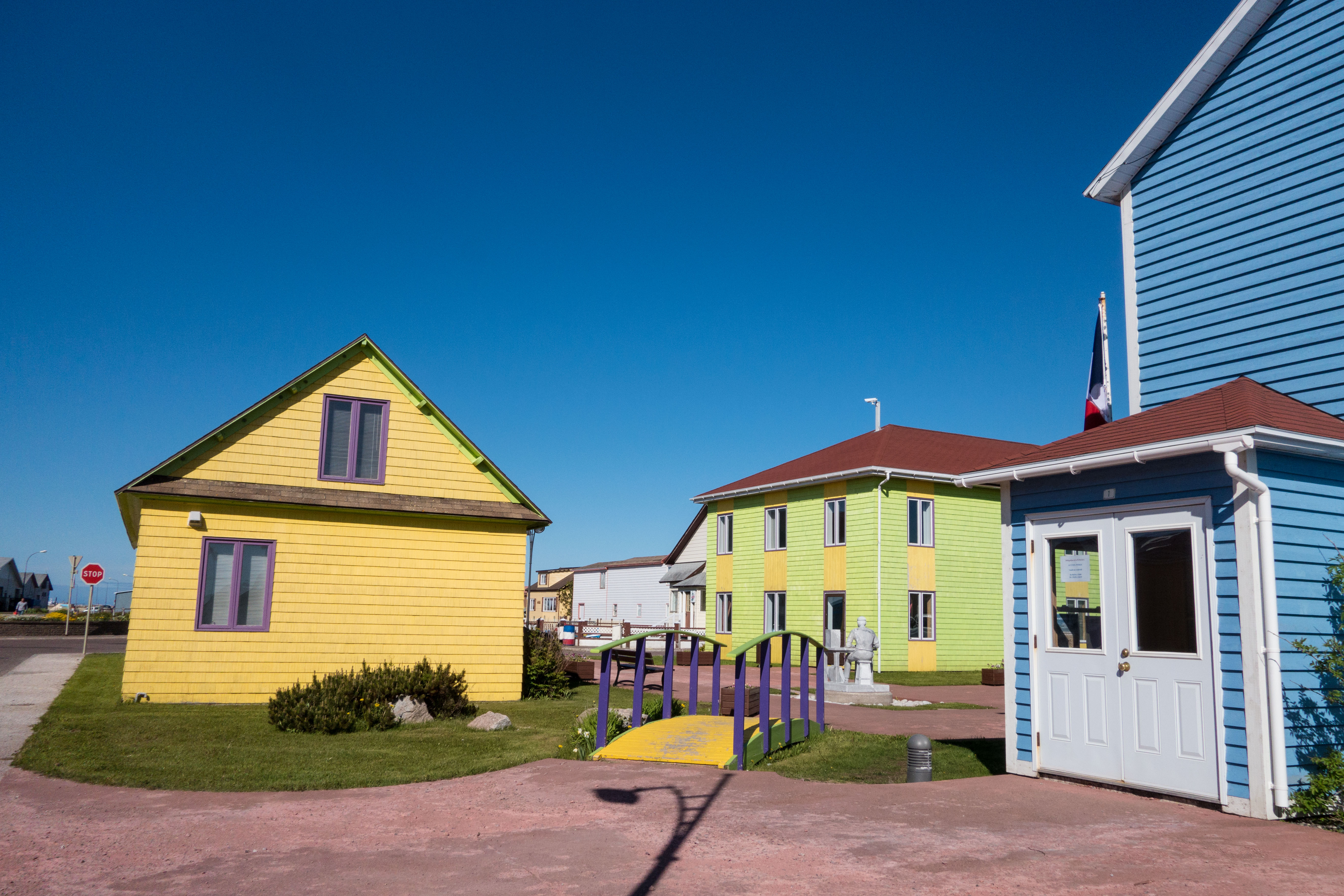
Houses in Miquelon village

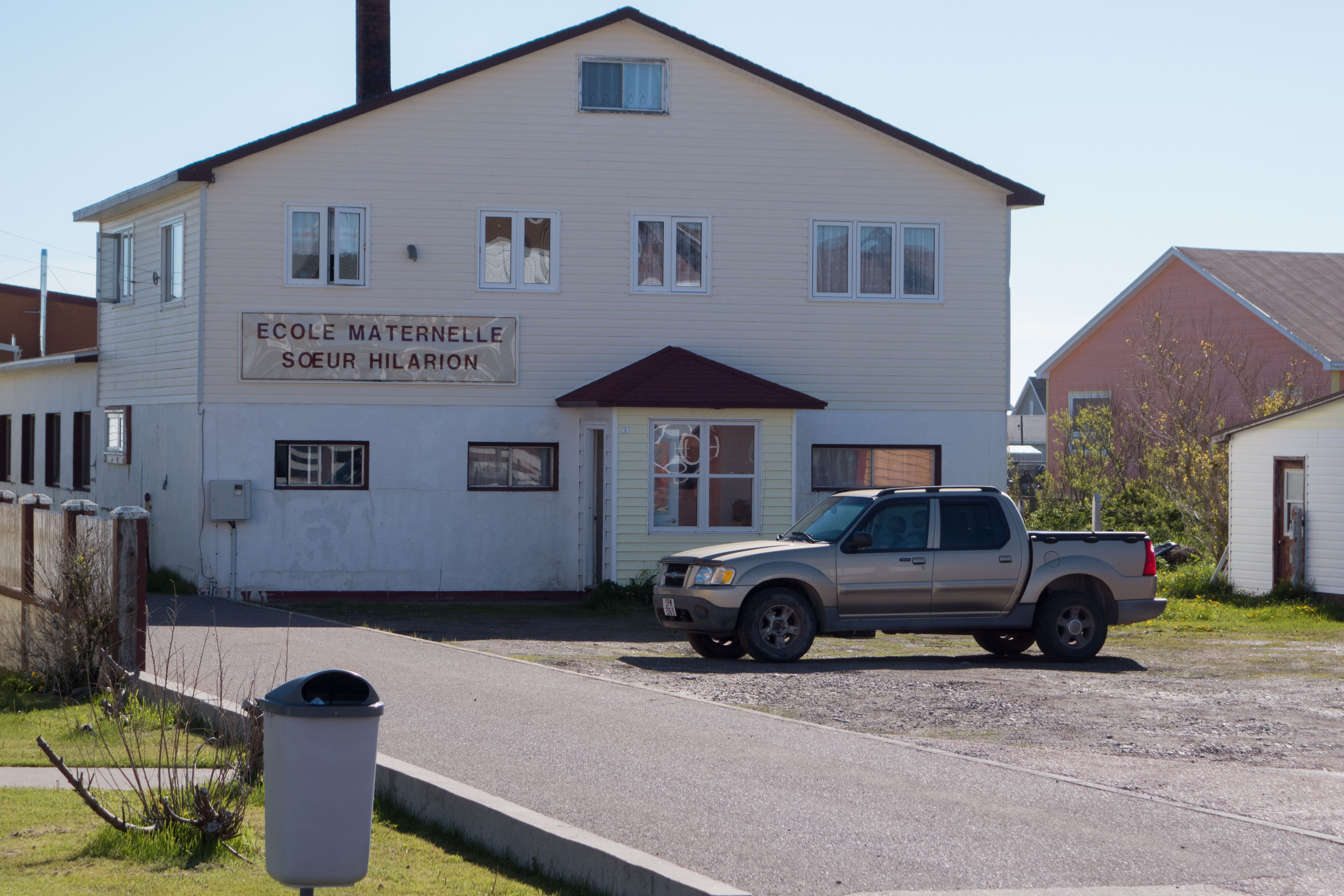
Miquelon's school building

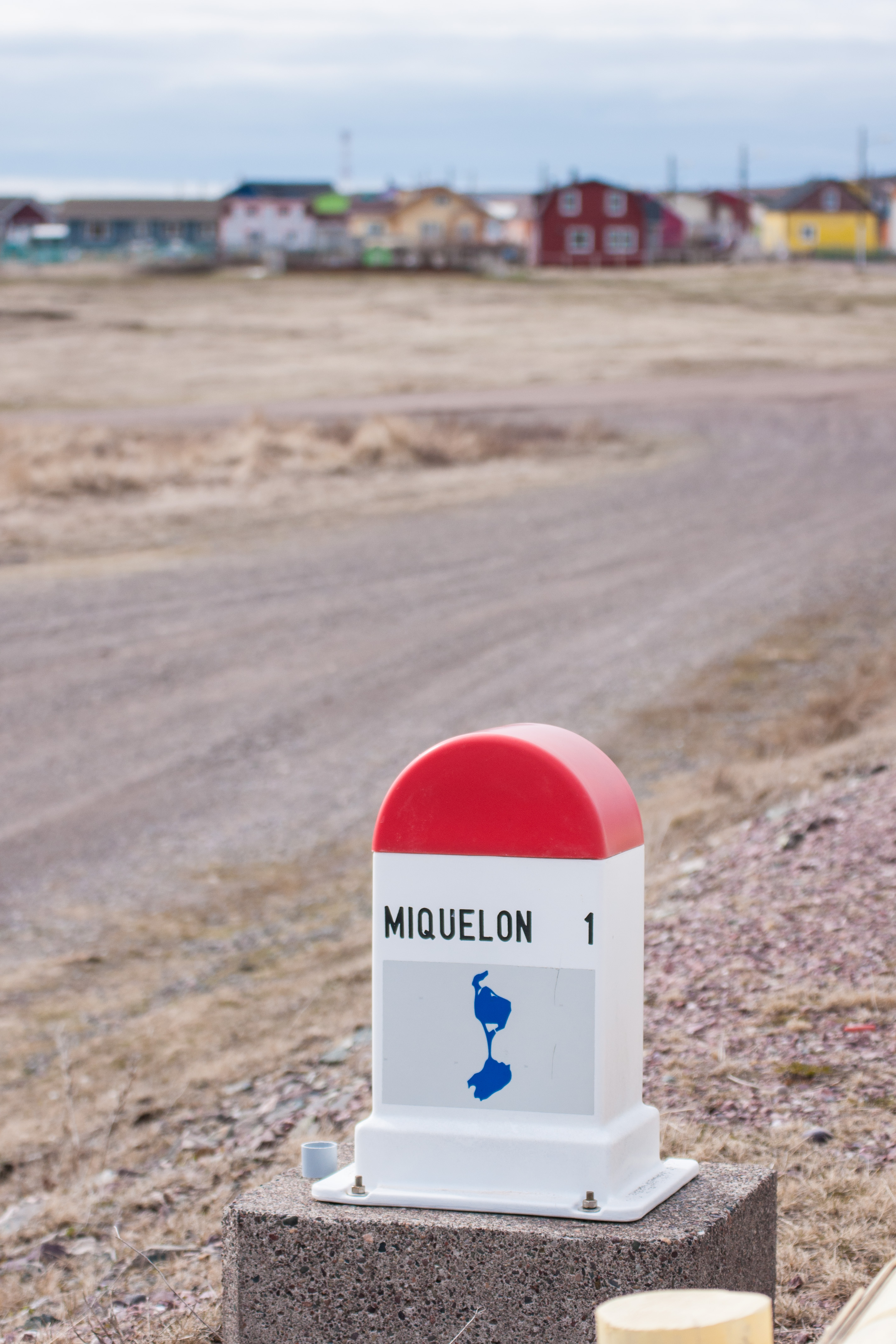
Milestone to Miquelon village

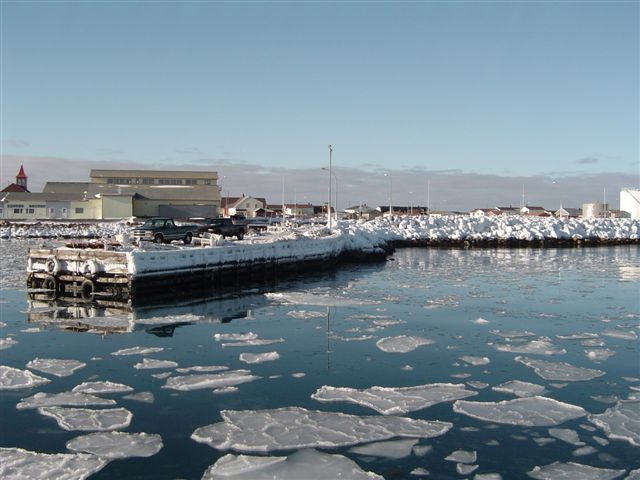
The port of Miquelon

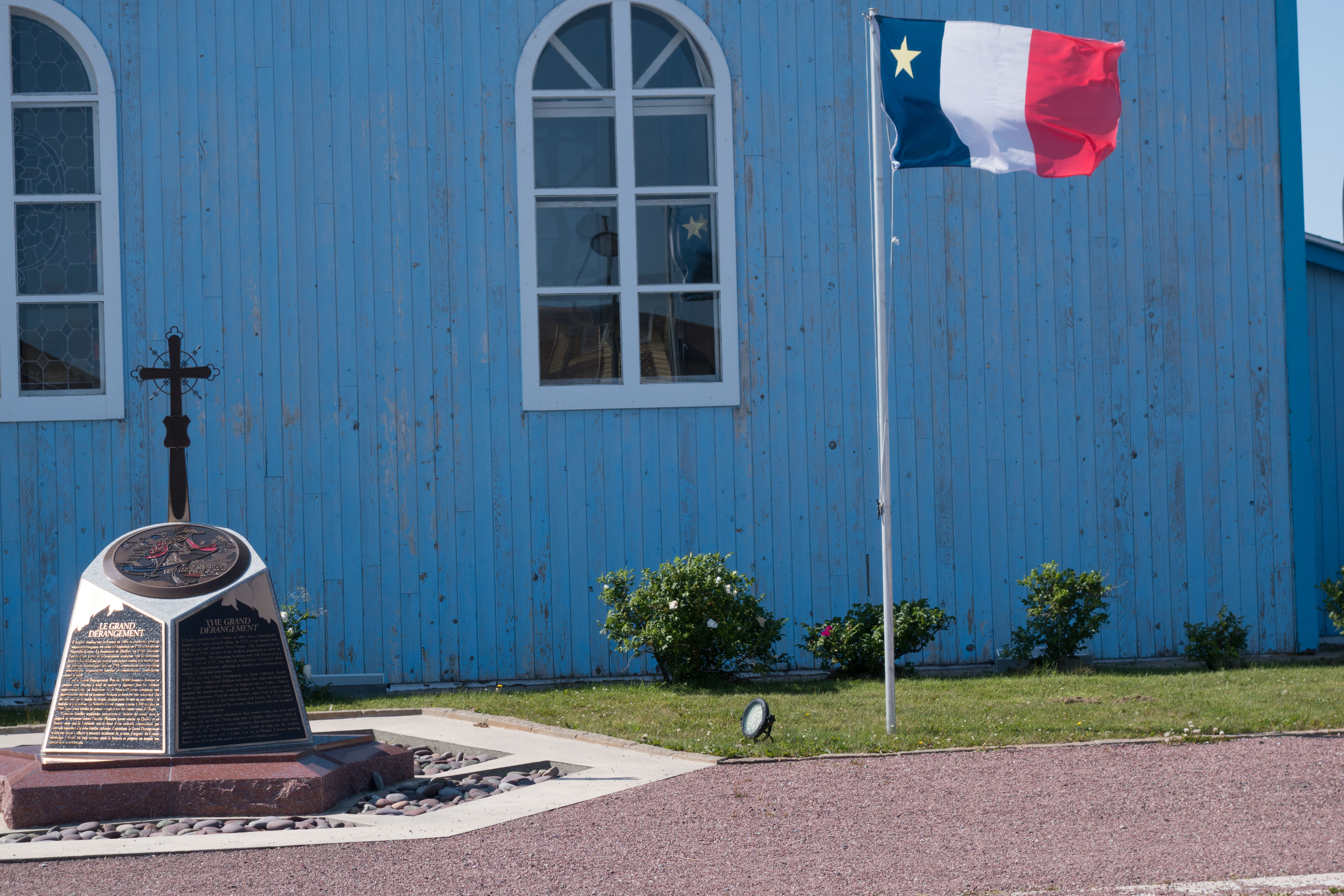
Acadien monument

Unofficial Flag of Miquelon–Langlade

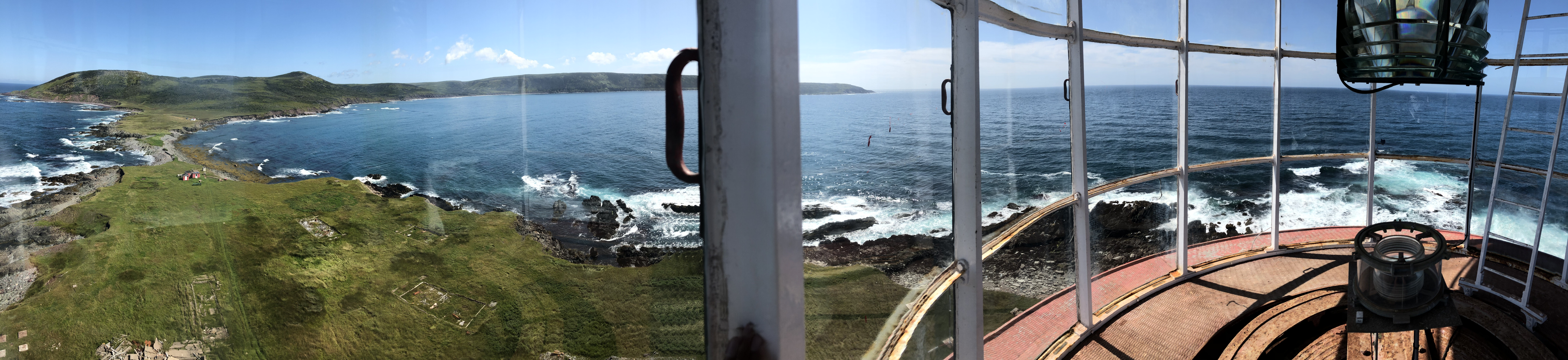
View from the Pointe Plate lighthouse on Langlade towards Miquelon

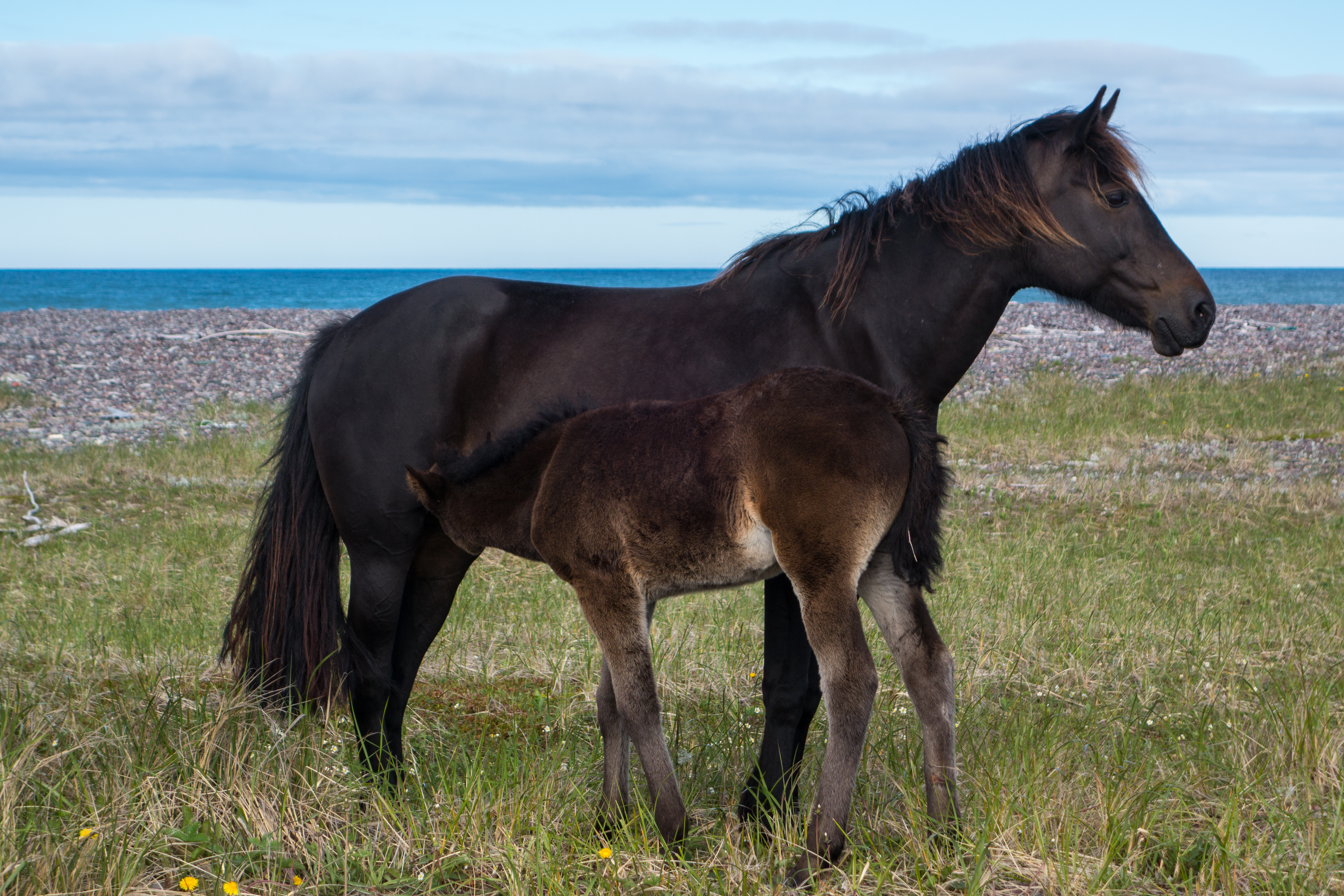
Horses on Langlade isthmus

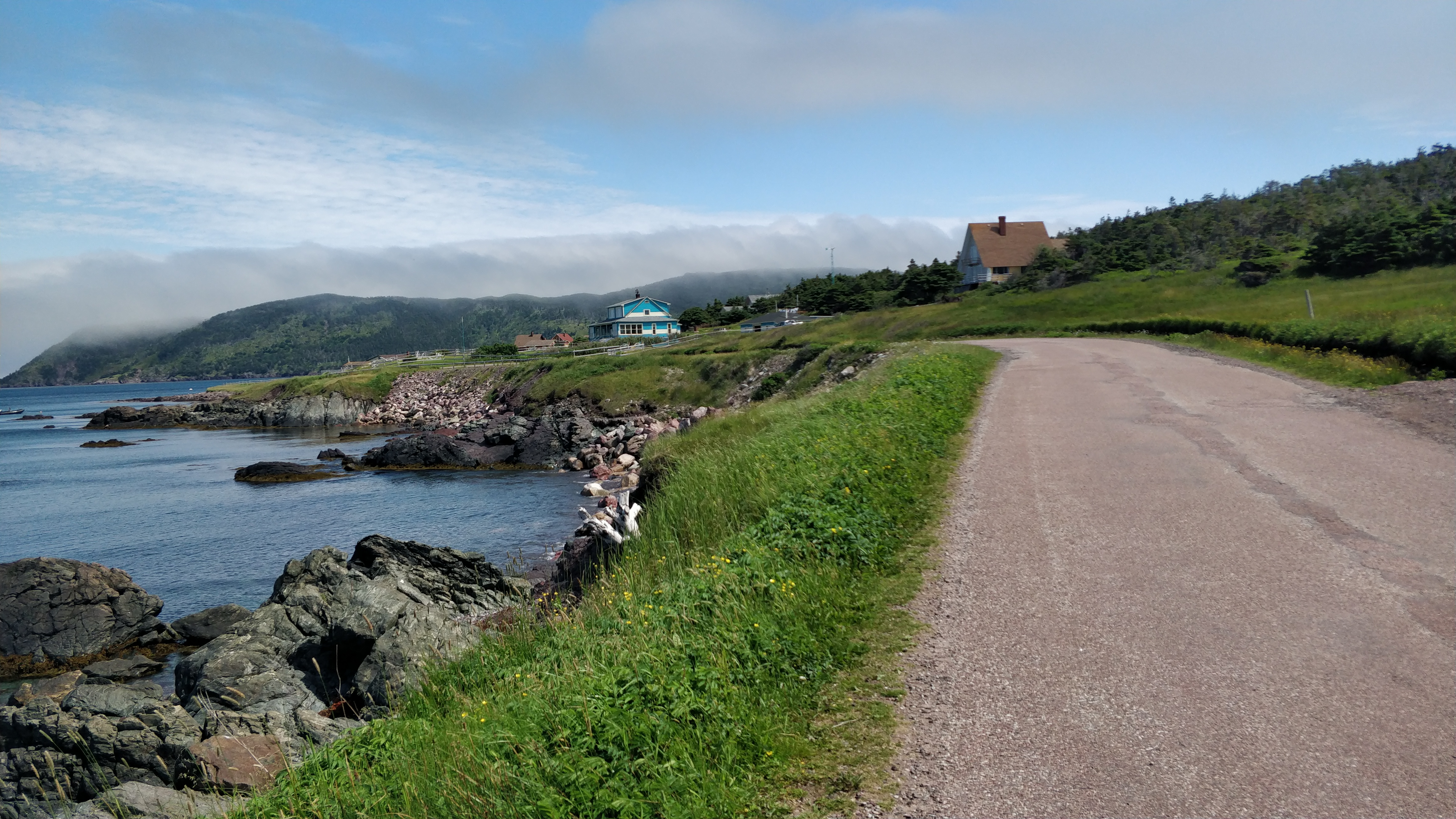
The road from Miquelon to Langlade

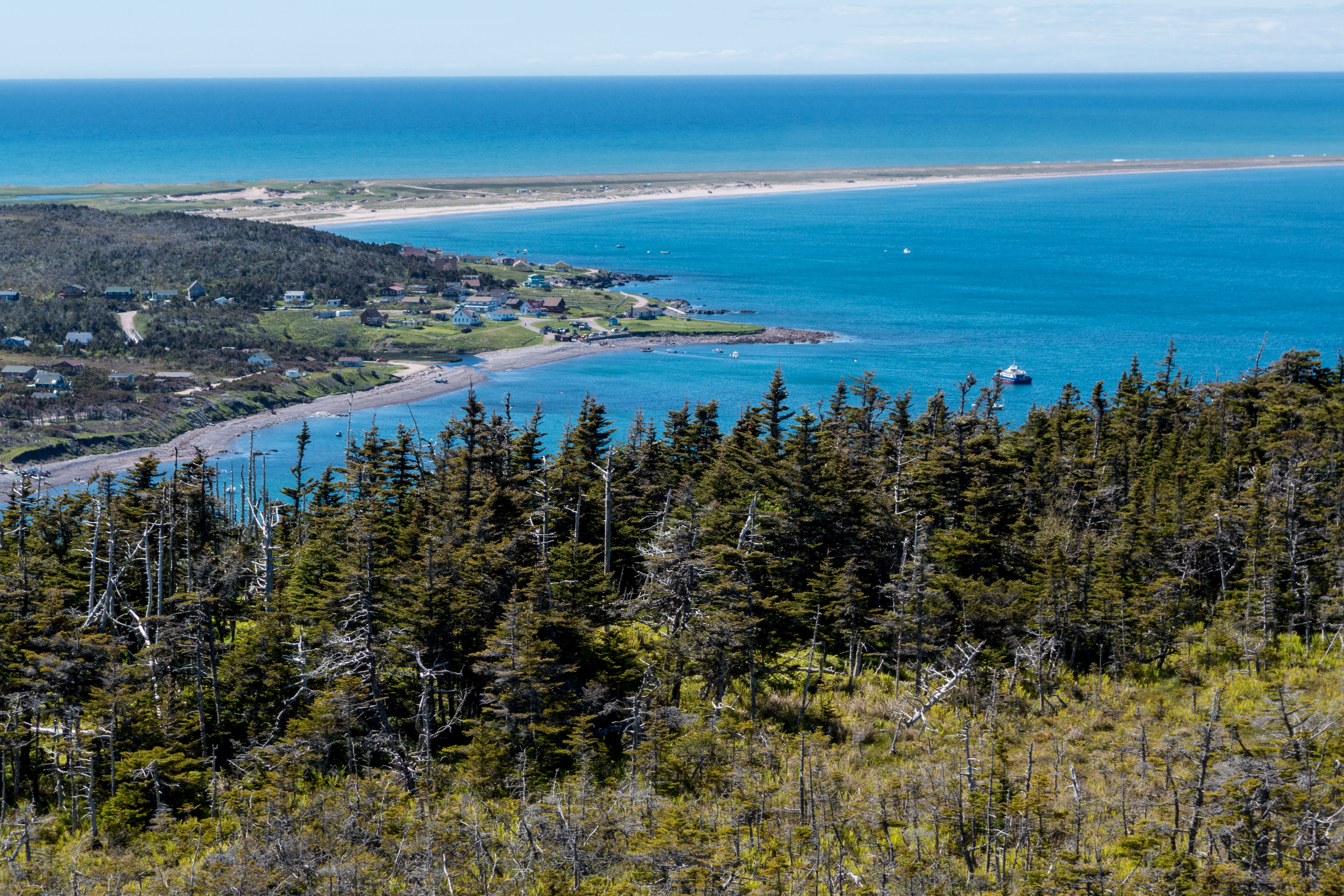
Langlade: Anse du Gouverneur cove

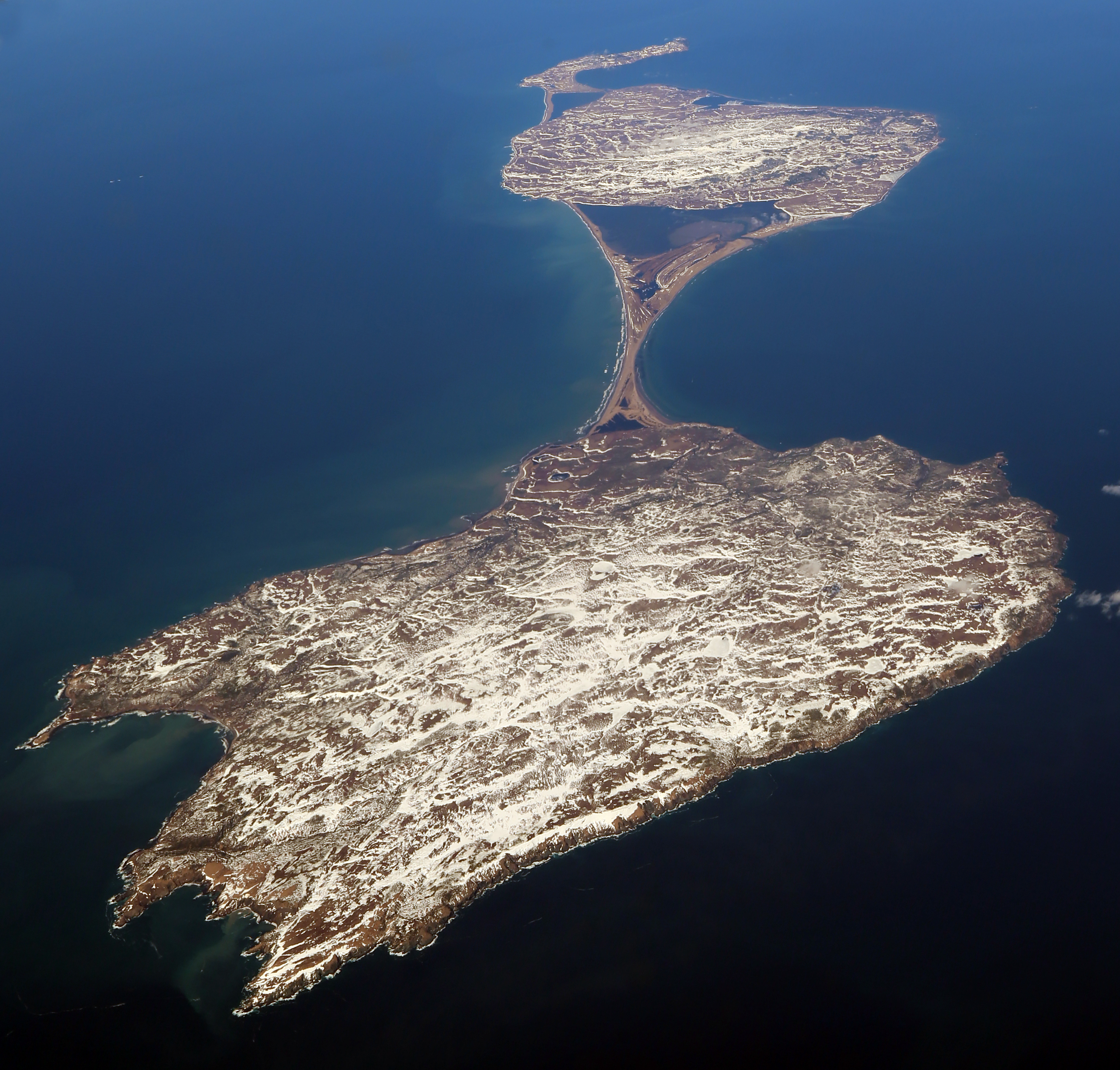
Snowcovered isthmus

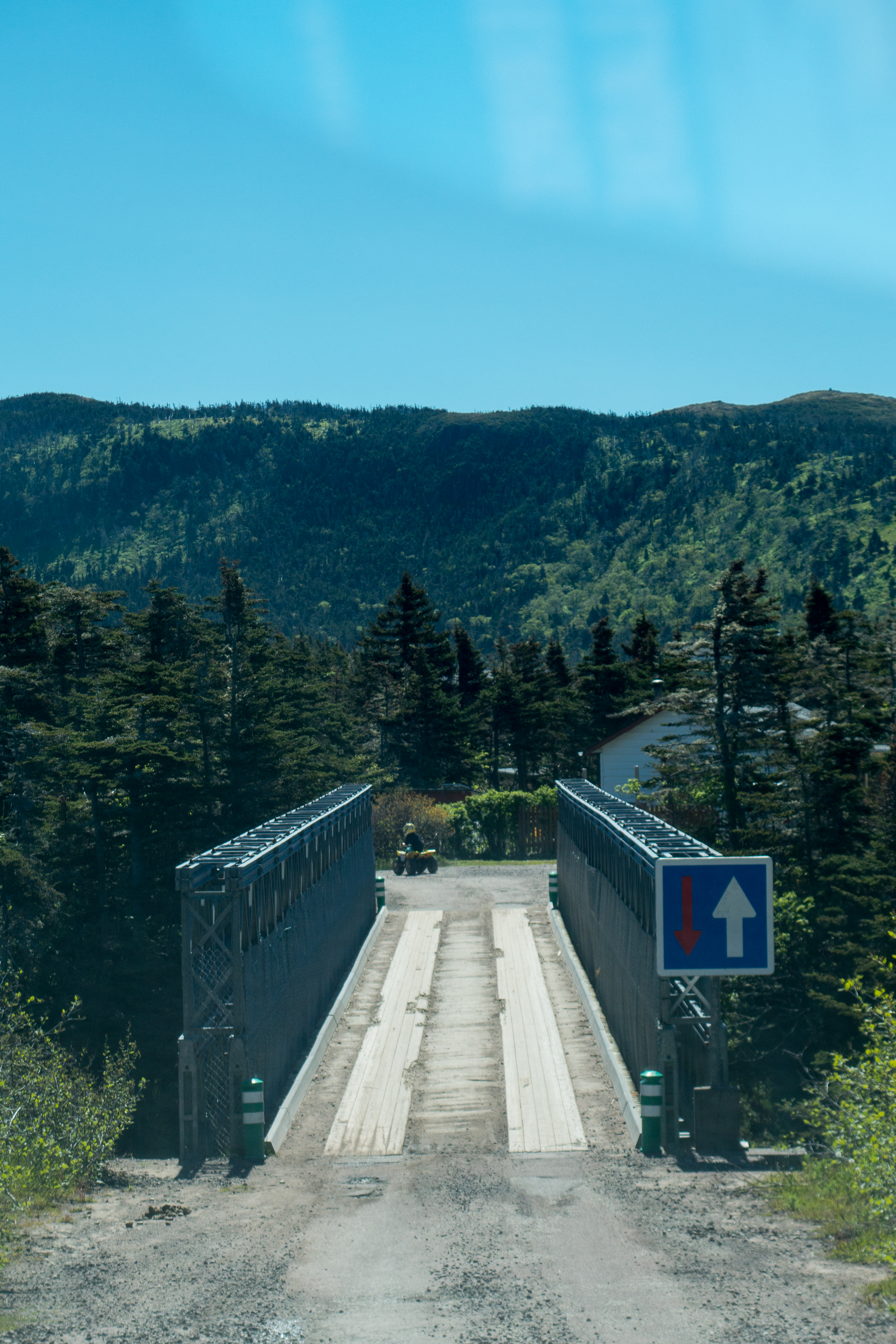
Bridge over the Belle Rivière (river)

== See also ==
- History of Saint Pierre and Miquelon
- List of islands in the Atlantic Ocean
- List of islands of France
- Municipal governments in Saint Pierre and Miquelon
- Saint Pierre
