= Saint Pierre Island =

Island in the Atlantic Ocean off the coast of Canada

Saint Pierre
Native name: Île Sainte-Pierre
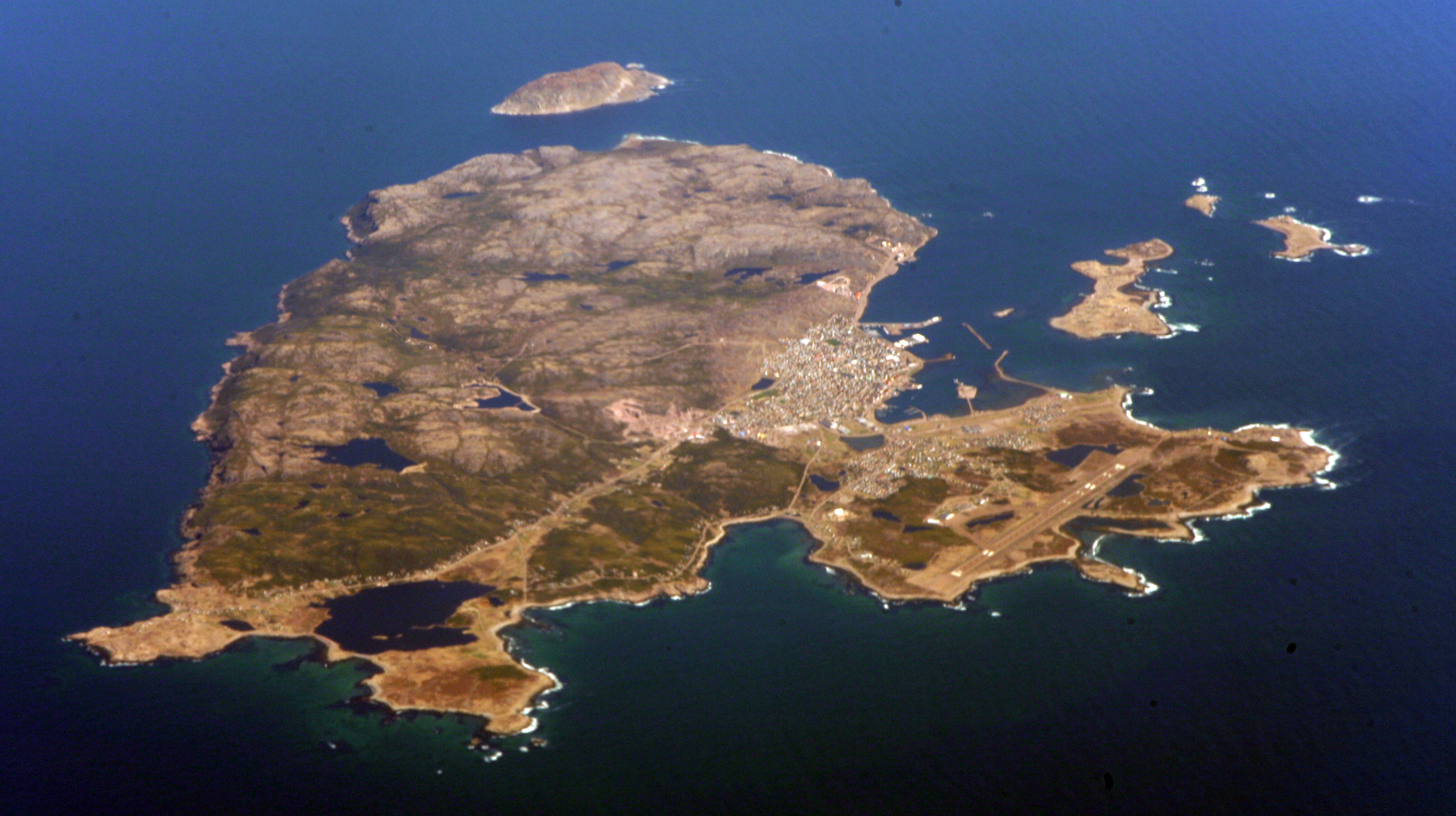
- Saint Pierre Island and its neighbouring islands in 2013

- Location within Saint Pierre and Miquelon

Geography
- Location: Atlantic Ocean
- Coordinates: 46°46′40″N 56°10′40″W
- Archipelago: Saint Pierre and Miquelon
- Adjacent to: Gulf of Saint Lawrence
- Area: 25 km^{2} (9.7 sq mi)
- Highest point: Le Trépied 207 m (679 ft)

Administration
- France
- Overseas collectivity: Saint Pierre and Miquelon
- Largest Commune: Saint-Pierre

Demographics
- Demonym: Saint-Pierrais
- Population: 5,888 (2011)
- Languages: French

Saint Pierre Island, also spelt as Saint-Pierre Island, is one of the three main islands of Saint Pierre and Miquelon. It contains the town of Saint-Pierre, which lies on the island's east coast and is the main population centre of the island group. It is part of an overseas collectivity of France, and is located near the Canadian province of Newfoundland and Labrador.

== Location ==
Saint Pierre Island is situated south of Newfoundland in the Gulf of Saint Lawrence in the North Atlantic Ocean. Its distance north–south from Newfoundland is 60 kilometres (32 nmi). The islands are even closer to the long Burin Peninsula, which is situated just 25 kilometres (13 nmi) to the east. In addition, Green Island, which belongs to Newfoundland, is located about halfway between the southern part of Miquelon-Langlade and Newfoundland at 46°52′44″N 56°05′21″W, only 10 kilometres (6 mi) from both Langlade and St. Pierre.

== Geography ==
Several smaller islands lie off the coast of Saint Pierre, notably L'Île-aux-Marins and L'Île-aux-Vainqueurs, both to the east, and Grand Colombier, which lies off Saint Pierre's northernmost point. Saint Pierre and its neighbouring islands form the Saint-Pierre commune, one of two communes in Saint Pierre and Miquelon (the other being Miquelon-Langlade). The island is accessible by ferry from Newfoundland and has immigration control for the country of France.

St. Pierre is separated from Miquelon-Langlade by a 6 kilometres (3.2 nmi) strait with very fierce currents. Fishermen call this section of ocean "The Mouth of Hell". The waters around these islands are very treacherous, and there have been over 600 shipwrecks along the coasts of the islands. The terrain is described as mostly barren rock.

The highest point of the island is Le Trépied at 207 m (679 ft) high.

== History ==
=== Colonial period ===
The Portuguese explorer João Álvares Fagundes is believed to have landed on the islands on 21 October 1520, naming them the 'Eleven Thousand Virgins' in honor of the feast day of Saint Ursula. French explorer Jacques Cartier claimed the islands for France in 1536, noting the presence of French and Breton fishing vessels. By the late 17th century, permanent French settlements had been established, with records indicating four inhabitants in 1670 and 22 by 1691.

Throughout the 18th century, Saint Pierre and Miquelon were contested between France and Britain, changing hands multiple times due to various treaties and conflicts. The Treaty of Utrecht in 1713 ceded the islands to Britain, but they were returned to France under the Treaty of Paris in 1763. During the American Revolutionary War, British forces again seized the islands in 1778, deporting French settlers. The islands were returned to France in 1783, only to be captured again by the British in 1793 during the French Revolutionary Wars. After several more exchanges, France permanently regained control in 1816.

=== 19th and 20th century developments ===
In the 19th century, the islands' economy thrived on the cod fishing industry, serving as a base for French fishermen. However, the late 1800s saw a decline due to overfishing and competition. During the Prohibition era in the United States (1920–1933), Saint Pierre and Miquelon became a hub for alcohol smuggling, temporarily boosting the local economy.

During World War II, the islands were under the control of Vichy France until December 1941, when Free French forces seized them, an action later endorsed by a local referendum. Post-war, the islands faced economic challenges due to the decline of the fishing industry. In 1946, Saint Pierre and Miquelon became overseas territory of France. They were designated as overseas departments in 1976 and later as a territorial collectivity in 1985, granting them a degree of administrative autonomy. Today, the islands maintain their French heritage while exploring economic diversification beyond fishing.

== Demographics ==
The residents are known as Saint-Pierrais and are citizens of France. The population of the island in 2011 was 5,888 people and the population was mainly French and Acadian.

== Gallery ==
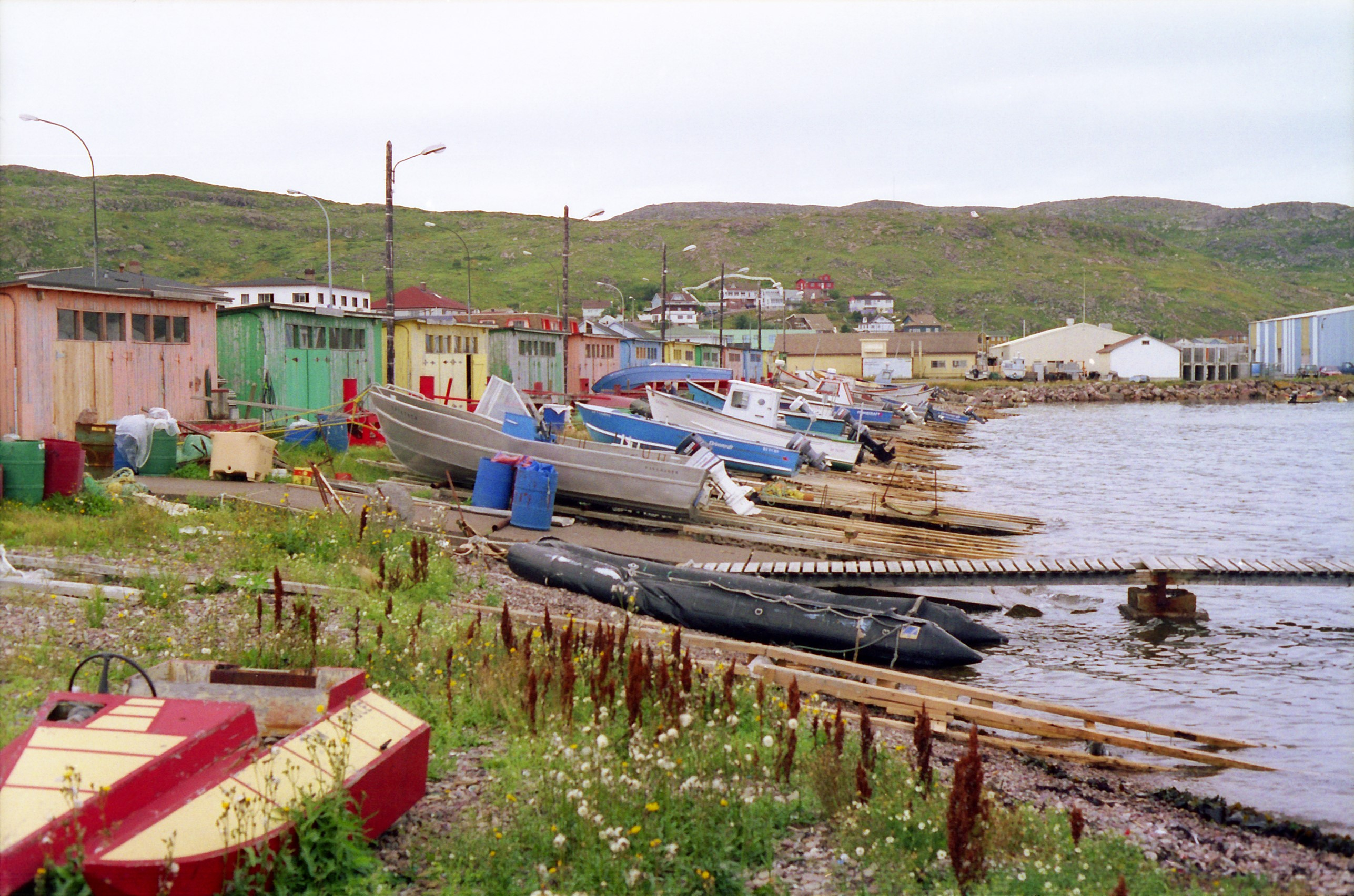
St. Pierre beached boats

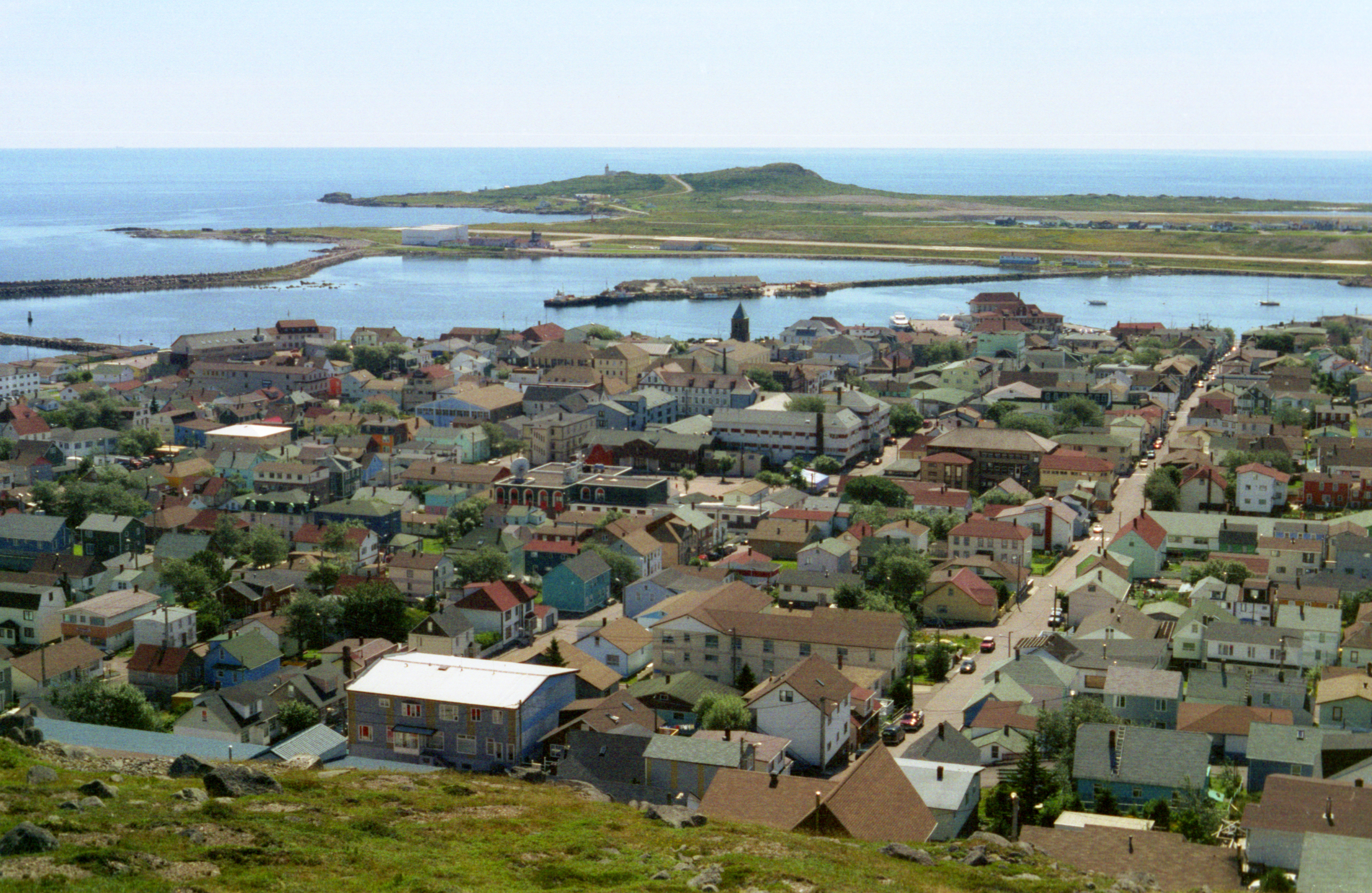
St. Pierre view from hilltop
