= SPM Telecom =

French telecommunications company

SPM Telecom S.A.S.
- Trade name: SPM Telecom, SPMT or SPM Ameris (and France Télécom)
- Company type: Private (Société par actions simplifiée)
- Industry: Telecommunications
- Founded: 1999; 27 years ago
- Founder: Charles Landry
- Headquarters: Saint-Pierre, Saint Pierre and Miquelon, France
- Area served: Saint Pierre and Miquelon
- Key people: Xavier Bowring (CEO)
- Owner: Orange S.A. (70%); Landry S.A.S. (30%)
- Parent: Orange Group
- Website: https://www.spmtelecom.com/

SPM Telecom is a Internet service cable provider and a mobile phone operator in the French territory of Saint Pierre and Miquelon in North America. Created on September 30, 1999, it covers the territory of the archipelago off Newfoundland in 2G and 4G. It has one store in Saint-Pierre and a second in Miquelon-Langlade. Its Internet network is based on a submarine cable between Halifax (Nova Scotia, Canada) and Lamaline (Newfoundland and Labrador, Canada), then on radio frequencies to a tower at Cap-à-l'Aigle on Saint Pierre Island.

It is 70% owned by the French multinational Orange S.A., through its subsidiary Orange Caraïbe, and 30% by the local Landry family group.

== History ==
On June 23, 1982, the first automatic telephone links were established between Saint-Pierre and mainland France, as well as several European countries.

In 2002, France Télécom, via its local subsidiary SPM Telecom, launched the “cheznoo.net” portal, featuring local events, classified ads and live webcams from the archipelago. Over the years, it has become an emblematic Saint Pierre and Miquelon website. That year, SPM Telecom had more than 2,200 subscribers to its mobile telephony services, while its Canadian competitor NewTel, now Bell Aliant, had only around one hundred.

In October 2014, Orange Group and SPM Telecom lost their cell phone monopoly in Saint Pierre and Miquelon with the arrival of local competitor Globaltel.

== Mobile coverage ==
SPM Telecom offers 2G and 4G coverage and does not offer 5G in all the territories it covers. According to the "Schéma directeur territorial d'aménagement numérique" (SDTAM) published in 2021, the operator does not appear to be transmitting information on its 2G and 4G coverage to Arcep, like its competitor Globaltel.

== See also ==
- Orange S.A.
- Mobile network operator
