= SPM Ferries =

Ferry company of Saint Pierre and Miquelon

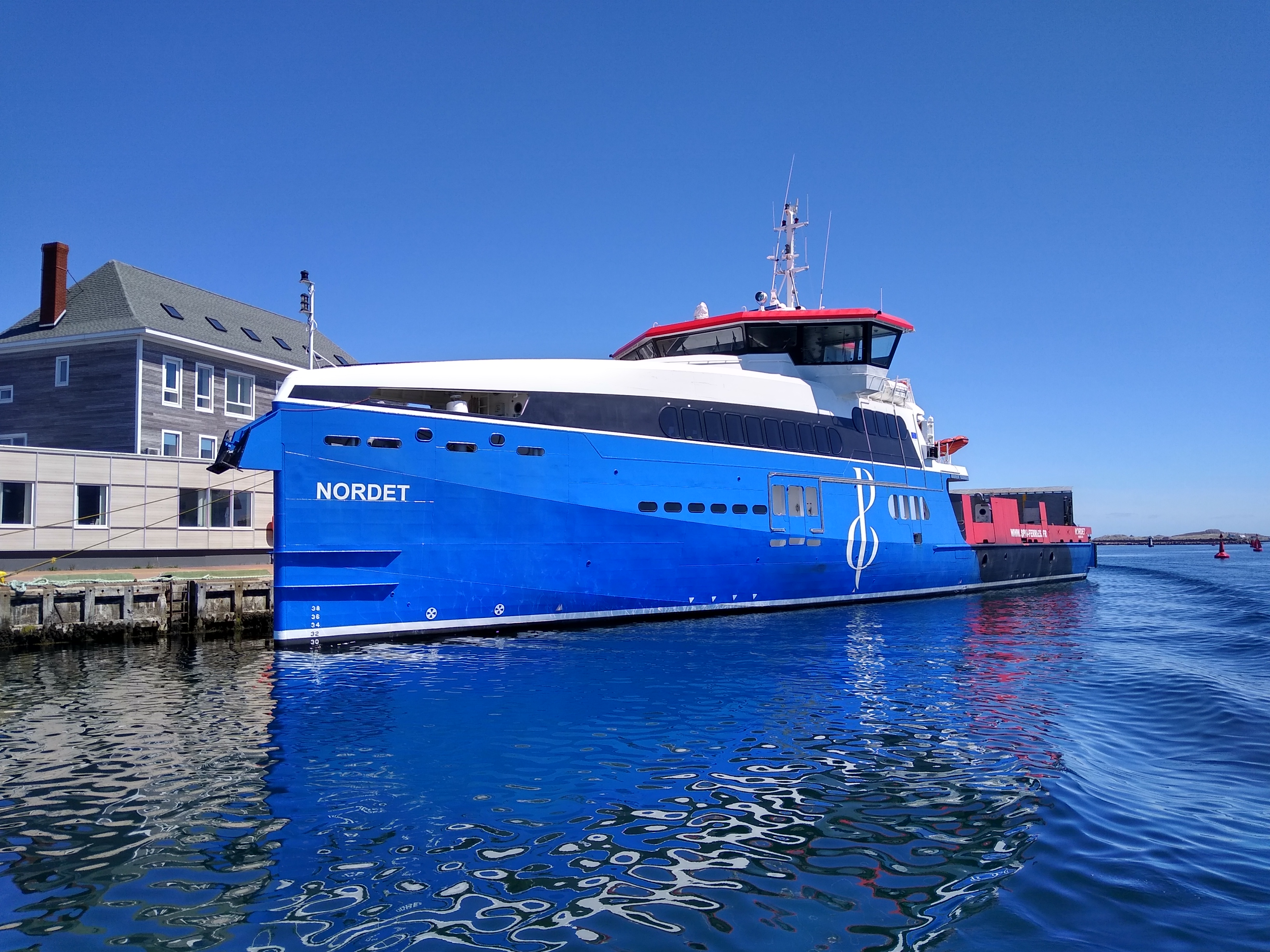
SPM Ferries' Nordet, serving the Fortune–Saint-Pierre route, in port at Saint-Pierre

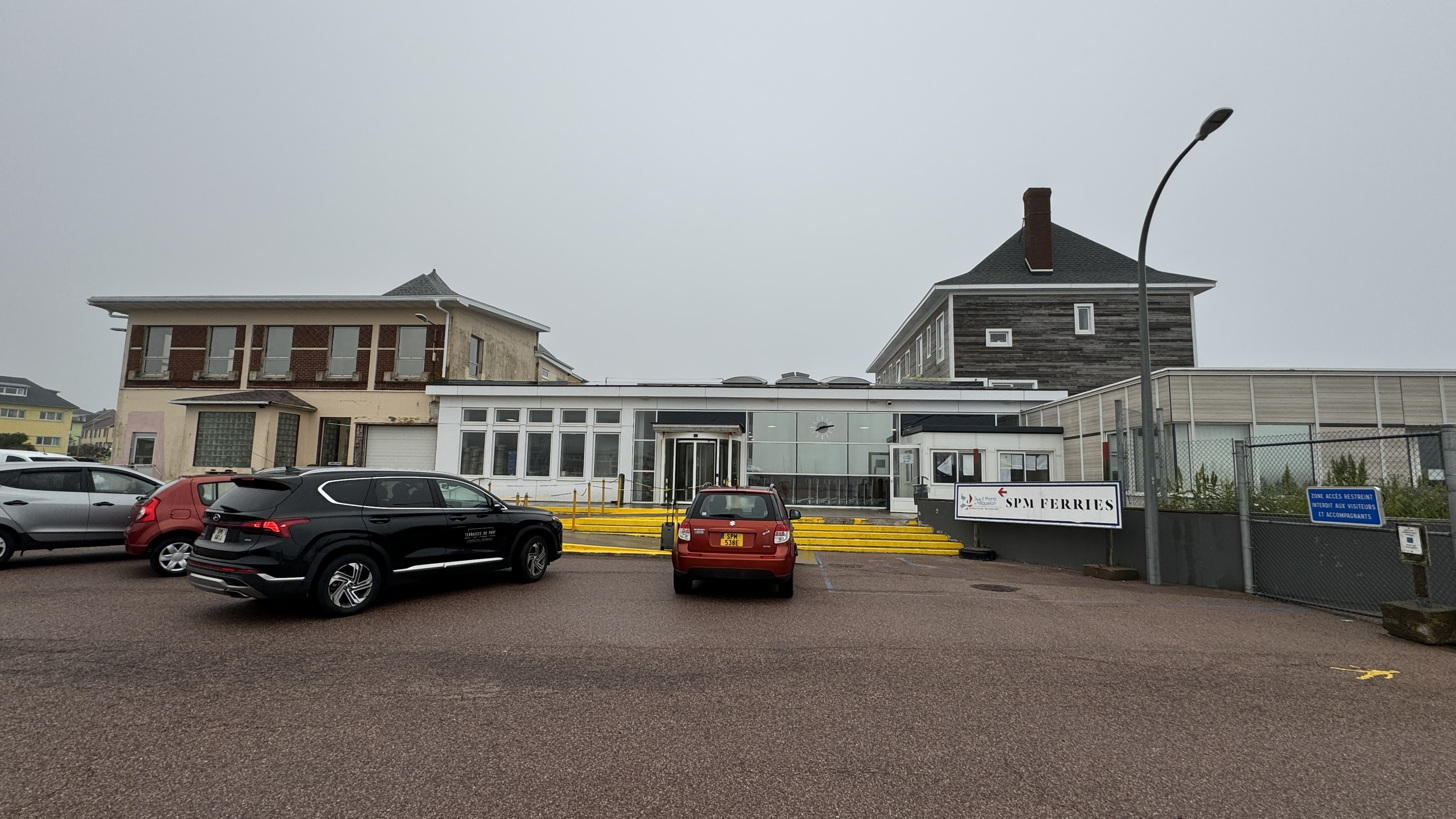
SPM Ferries ferry terminal in Saint-Pierre

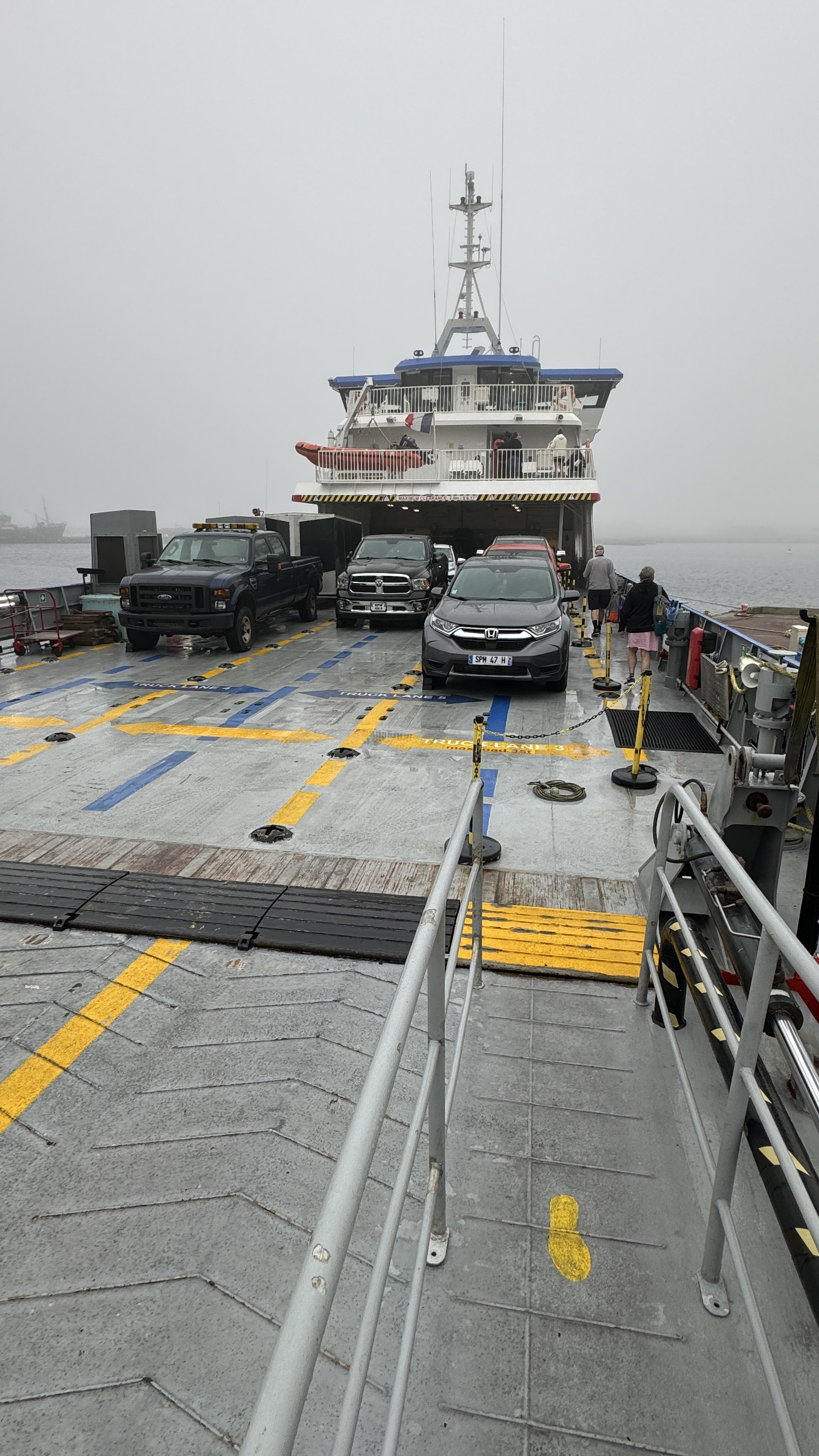
Car deck on a Newfoundland-to-Saint-Pierre ferry

SPM Ferries is a company that operates ferries between the islands of Saint Pierre and Miquelon-Langlade in Saint Pierre and Miquelon, an overseas collectivity of France, and the port of Fortune, on the island of Newfoundland, Canada. The organising authority is the Territorial Council of Saint Pierre and Miquelon. It operates three vessels:

- Nordet put into service in 2019
- Suroît put into service in 2019
- Jeune France

Nordet and Suroît replaced Cabestan which had previously provided service before 2019.

== History ==
Small package transport was discontinued in 2022.

SPM Ferries and its three ships and its management conducted large-scale exercises at sea on June 7 and 8, 2022, in partnership with Fulmar, the Canadian Coast Guard, and the SNSM vessel Jaro II. The company is a member of the SAREX 2022 program, which mandates the annual exercises following international and national regulations. The vessels practiced hoisting, towing, collision response, medical assistance, and firefighting.

In 2023, the company joined Green Marine Europe and received its certification for that program.

== Ports served ==
SPM Ferries operate at the ports of:

- Fortune (Newfoundland) 47.073597°N 55.8330229°W
- Saint-Pierre town 46.7786129°N 56.1763558°W
- Miquelon town (at l'Anse de Miquelon or Miquelon Cove) 47.102684°N 56.3779318°W
- Langlade, at Léonce Dupont quay in La Colo 47.1008109°N 56.3732957°W
  - At Langlade, as there is no wharf, passengers are transferred in a Zodiac Nautic inflatable boat to and from the ferry, which waits offshore.

== Routes ==
Routes vary by month, with frequencies varying between a maximum frequency in summer and minimum frequency in winter. As of 2024 the schedule was as follows:

Route		Frequencies per day each way (2024)														Crossing time	Adult fare (2024)	
Between...	...and...	Max.							Min.							Crossing time	One- way	Round trip
Between...	...and...	Su	M	Tu	W	Th	F	Sa	Su	M	Tu	W	Th	F	Sa	Crossing time	One- way	Round trip
Saint Pierre (town)	Fortune (Canada)	1	-	1	1	1	1	1	-	1	-	1	-	1	-	90 min.	€45	€73
Miquelon (town)	Fortune (Canada)	-	1	-	-	-	-	1	-	-	-	1	-	-	-	90 min.	€45	€73
Saint-Pierre (town)	Miquelon (town)	1	1	1	-	1	1	1	1	-	1	-	1	1	-	90 min.	€16	€24
Saint-Pierre (town)	Langlade (Léonce Dupont quay)	1	1	-	1	1	1	1	1	-	-	-	-	1	1	75 min.	€10	€17

== Fleet ==
The attributes of the ships are

Attribute	Nordet and Suroît (each)	Jeune France
Overall length	56.70 metres (186.0 ft)	19.25 metres (63.2 ft)
Width	10.8 metres (35 ft)	
Gross tonnage	768 UMS	75 UMS
Net tonnage	230 UMS	
Engines		Baudouin 6 S111 SRP
Propulsion mode	Diesel	
Propulsive power	4 x 1081 kW	2 X 300 CV
Auxiliary power	4 x 99 kW	
Propellers	4 fixed blade	2 fixed-pitch
Speed in use	20.5 knots	
Crew size	8	
Passengers transported (max.)	181–188	120
Cars transported (max.)	18	
Category of navigation	3rd	
