= Regional Joint Cooperation Commission =

- - French: Commission mixte de coopération régionale
- Atlantic Canada and Saint Pierre and Miquelon in North America.
- Headquarters: Moncton, New Brunswick and Saint-Pierre, Saint Pierre and Miquelon
- Official languages: English; French
- Type: Intergovernmental organization
- Membership: New Brunswick, Nova Scotia, Newfoundland and Labrador, Prince Edward Island and Saint Pierre and Miquelon

Leaders
  - Copresident: Laura Lee Langley (representative of ACOA)
  - Copresident: Bruno André (prefect of Saint Pierre and Miquelon)

Establishment
  - 1994 Franco-Canadian Agreement signed: 2 December 1994 (31 years ago)

Area
  - Total: 503,169 km^{2} (194,275 sq mi)
- Website www.canada.ca/en/atlantic-canada-opportunities/corporate/atlantic-canada-saint-pierre-miquelon.html

The Regional Joint Cooperation Commission (in French: Commission mixte de coopération régionale) is an intergovernmental organization created by Canada and France following the signing and implementation of the Franco-Canadian agreement of 2 December 1994 for the development of regional cooperation between the four Atlantic Canadian provinces and the territorial collectivité of Saint Pierre and Miquelon.

The Commission meets once a year, alternately in Saint Pierre and Miquelon and the Atlantic Canadian provinces.

== History ==
On December 2, 1994, the Federal Government of Canada and the Government of the French Republic signed the Agreement between the Government of Canada and the Government of the French Republic on the Development of Regional Cooperation between the Canadian Atlantic Provinces and the French Territorial Community of Saint-Pierre and Miquelon, creating a Joint Commission on Regional Cooperation. Its implementation is entrusted to the Atlantic Canada Opportunities Agency (ACOA) by the Canadian federal government and to the Préfecture of Saint-Pierre and Miquelon by the French government.

On October 13, 2016, Canadian Prime Minister Justin Trudeau and French Prime Minister Manuel Valls committed to a Canada-France enhanced cooperation program to "continue to support the integration of Saint-Pierre and Miquelon into its regional environment".

== See also ==
- Joint Rescue Coordination Centre Halifax
