= Saint Pierre and Miquelon =

Overseas collectivity of France

Saint Pierre and Miquelon Saint-Pierre-et-Miquelon (French) Saint-Pierre eta Mikelune (Basque)
- Overseas collectivity of France
- Territorial Collectivity of Saint Pierre and Miquelon; Collectivité territoriale de Saint-Pierre-et-Miquelon (French)
- Flag (unofficial) Coat of arms
- Motto: "A Mare Labor" (Latin) ("From the Sea, Work")
- Anthem: La Marseillaise ("The Marseillaise")
- Location of Saint Pierre and Miquelon in North America.
- Sovereign state: France
- Cession from the United Kingdom: 30 May 1814; 212 years ago
- Territorial status within the French Union: 27 October 1946; 80 years ago
- Collectivity status: 28 March 2003; 23 years ago
- Capital and largest city: Saint-Pierre; 46.7778°N 56.1778°W
- Official languages: French
- Common languages: Saint Pierre and Miquelon French
- Demonym(s): Saint-Pierrais; Miquelonnais; Pierrian
- Government: Devolved parliamentary local authority within French Republic
  - President of France: Emmanuel Macron
  - Prefect: Bruno André
  - President of the Collectivity: Bernard Briand
- Legislature: Territorial Council

French Parliament
  - Senate: 1 senator (of 348)
  - National Assembly: 1 seat (of 577)

Area
  - Total: 242 km^{2} (93 sq mi)
  - Water (%): negligible
- Highest elevation: 240 m (790 ft)

Population
  - 2023 census: 5,790
  - Density: 24/km^{2} (62.2/sq mi) (not ranked)
- GDP (nominal): 2015 estimate
  - Total: €240 million
  - Per capita: €39,778
- Currency: Euro (€) (EUR) (official); Canadian dollar (C$) (CAD) (widely accepted)
- Time zone: UTC−03:00
  - Summer (DST): UTC−02:00
- Date format: dd/mm/yyyy (AD)
- Driving side: Right
- Calling code: +508
- INSEE code: 975
- ISO 3166 code: PM; FR-PM
- Internet TLD: .pm
- Website: www.spm-ct975.fr

Map of Saint Pierre and Miquelon

Saint Pierre and Miquelon (/ˈmiːkəlɒn/, MEEK-ə-lon), officially the Territorial Collectivity of Saint Pierre and Miquelon (French: Collectivité territoriale de Saint-Pierre-et-Miquelon; pronounced [sɛ̃.pjɛ.ʁ‿e.mi.klɔ̃], Basque: Saint-Pierre eta Mikelune), is a self-governing territorial overseas collectivity of France in the northwestern Atlantic Ocean, located off the Canadian island of Newfoundland. Saint Pierre and Miquelon is an archipelago of eight islands, covering 242 km^{2} (93 sq mi) of land. It had an estimated population of 5,513 in 2026 and its residents are French citizens; they elect their own deputy to the National Assembly and participate in senatorial and presidential elections.

Saint Pierre and Miquelon is an overseas country and territory (OCT) of the European Union, although not an integral part of it. It is neither part of the Schengen area, nor of the European customs territory. On the other hand, the euro is the official currency in Saint Pierre and Miquelon, and its inhabitants have European Union citizenship. The territory is also part of the Regional Joint Cooperation Commission (Atlantic Canada Cooperation), the Halifax Search and Rescue Region and the Northwest Atlantic Fisheries Organization.

The islands are in the Gulf of St. Lawrence near the entrance of Fortune Bay, which extends into the southwestern coast of Newfoundland, near the Grand Banks of Newfoundland. St. Pierre is 19 kilometres (10 1/2 nautical miles) from Point May on the Burin Peninsula of Newfoundland and 3,819 kilometres (2,373 mi) from Brest, the nearest city in Metropolitan France. The tiny Canadian Green Island lies 10 kilometres (5 1/2 nmi) east of Saint Pierre, roughly halfway to Point May.

== Etymology ==
Saint-Pierre is French for Saint Peter, the patron saint of fishermen.

The present name of Miquelon was first noted in the form of Micquetô, Miqueton, or Micquellon in the French Basque sailor Martin de Hoyarçabal's 1579 navigational pilot for Newfoundland, Les voyages aventureux du Capitaine Martin de Hoyarsabal, habitant du çubiburu:

Lying on Cape Breton and the Pertuis de Miqueton east west, there are 42 l. [leagues] ... Lying the Dove of S. Pierre the pertuis de Micquellon north-northeast & south-southeast: there are 7 l. (Note: French: "Giſant le cap de Breton & le pertuis de Miqueton est oest, y a 42 l. ... Gisant la Colombe de S. Pierre le pertuis de Micquellon nord noroest & sud suest: y a 7 l.")

It has been claimed that the name Miquelon is a Basque form of Michael; Mikel and Mikels are usually named Mikelon in the Basque Country. Therefore, from Mikelon, it may have been written in the French way with a qu instead of a k.

The Basque Country is divided between Spain and France, and most Basques live south of the border. For that reason, Miquelon may have been influenced by the Spanish name Miguelón, an augmentative form of Miguel meaning "big Michael". The adjoined island's name of "Langlade" is said to be an adaptation of l'île à l'Anglais (Englishman's Island).

== History ==
=== Before 1900 ===
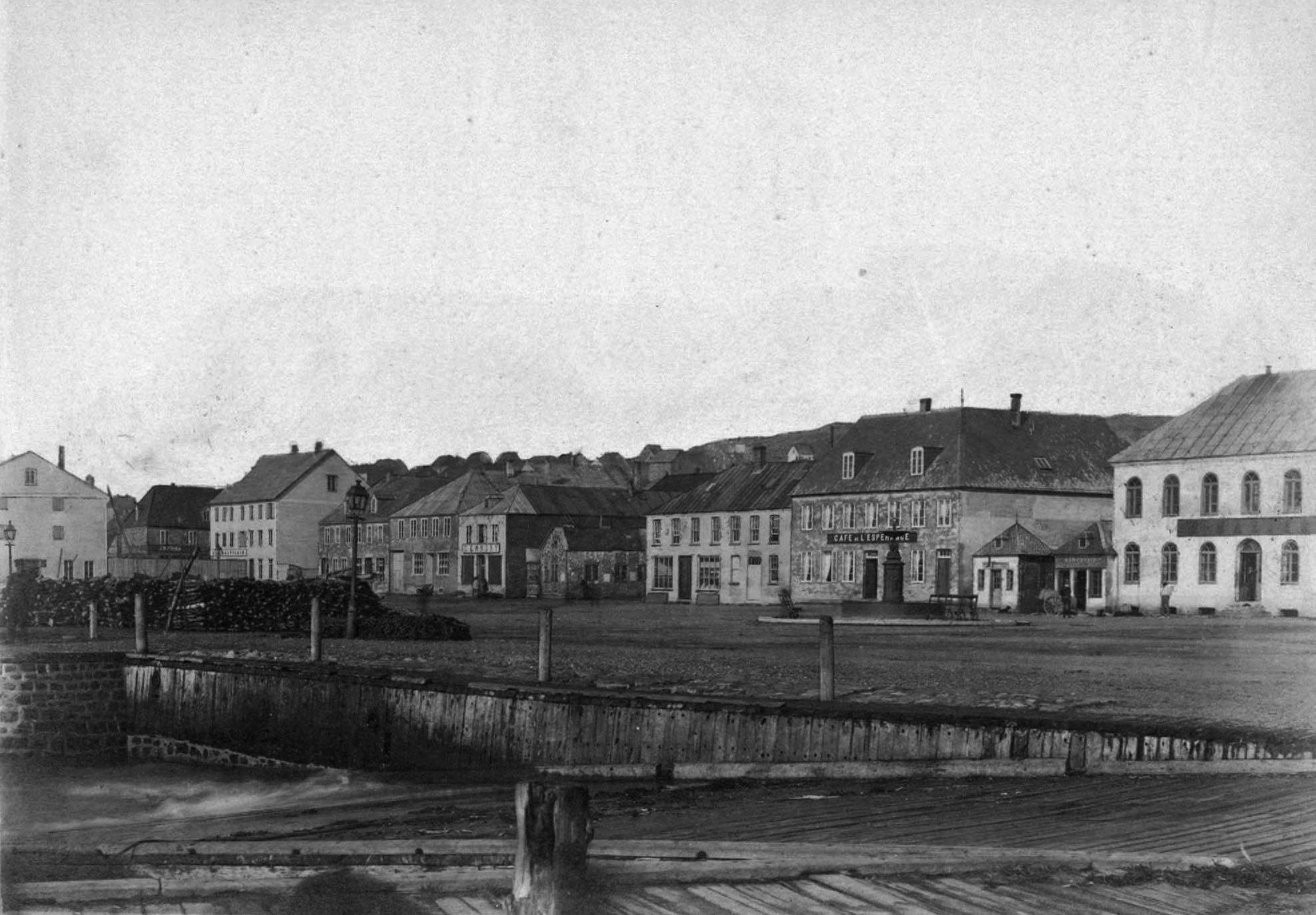
Quai La Roncière, Saint Pierre in 1887

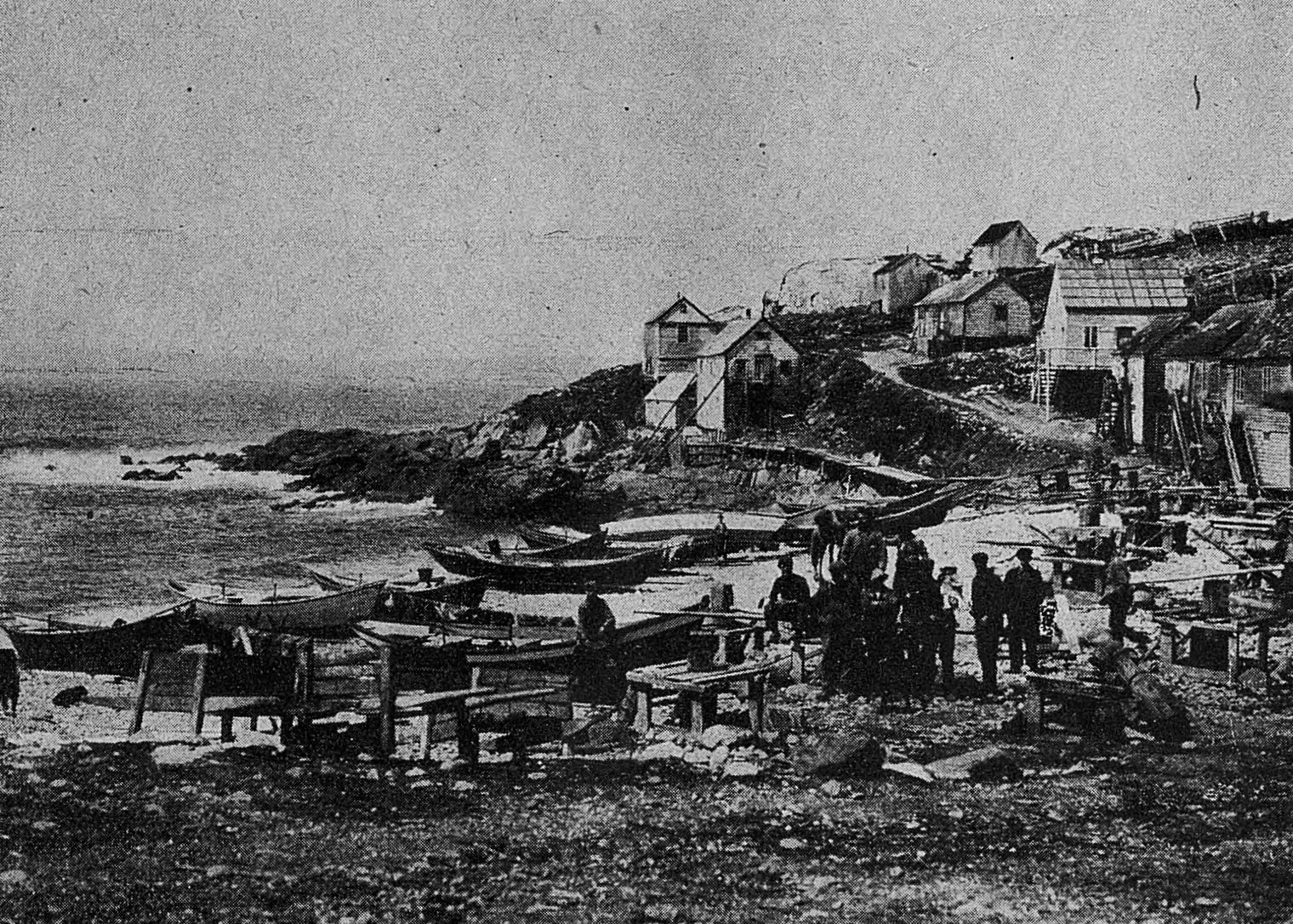
Saint Pierre in 1921

Archaeological evidence indicates that Indigenous peoples of Canada visited Saint Pierre and Miquelon in several distinct waves from c. 3000 BCE to about 1500 CE, shortly before Europeans arrived. The earliest inhabitants are classified as the archaic maritime culture, while the most recent are believed to be associated with the Beothuk. These Indigenous groups visited the islands as a seasonal hunting site and as a quarry for rhyolite stones used to make tools. However, there is no evidence of permanent or year-round Indigenous settlement on the islands.

On 21 October 1520, the Portuguese explorer João Álvares Fagundes landed on the islands and named the island group the "Eleven Thousand Virgins", as the day marked the feast day of Saint Ursula and her virgin companions. In 1536, the French explorer Jacques Cartier claimed the islands as a possession of France. Though already frequented by the Mi'kmaq and by Basque and Breton fishermen, the islands were not permanently settled until the end of the 17th century: four permanent inhabitants were counted in 1670, and 22 in 1691.

In 1670, during Jean Talon's second tenure as Intendant of New France, a French officer annexed the islands after he discovered 12 French fishermen encamped there, naming them Saint Pierre and Miquelon. During King William's War and Queen Anne's War, English forces launched multiple attacks against French colonial settlements on the islands, and by the early 18th century French colonists had abandoned Saint Pierre and Miquelon altogether. In the 1713 Peace of Utrecht, which ended the War of the Spanish Succession, France ceded the islands to Britain. The British renamed the island of Saint Pierre to Saint Peter, and small numbers of colonists from Britain and British America began to settle on the islands.

The 1763 Treaty of Paris, which ended the Seven Years' War, resulted in the French ceding all of New France to Britain and Spain, though the British granted fishing rights to French fishermen along the Newfoundland coast and returned Saint Pierre and Miquelon to France. In 1778, after France joined the American Revolutionary War against Britain, British forces under Vice-admiral John Montagu occupied Saint Pierre and Miquelon, burning all French settlements on the islands and deporting their inhabitants back to France. In 1793, another British force under Captain William Affleck occupied the islands during the War of the First Coalition; in the following year, the island's French colonists were deported and a British colony was established on Saint Pierre.

During the 1796 Newfoundland expedition, the nascent British colony was evacuated after the appearance of a French Navy squadron under Counter-admiral Joseph de Richery, which proceeded to burn the abandoned settlement. The 1802 Treaty of Amiens brought the islands back under French control, only for Britain to retake them after the Napoleonic Wars began the following year. They were returned to France once more under the 1814 Treaty of Paris, though the British briefly occupied the islands during the Hundred Days in 1815. When the French returned to the islands in 1816, they found that all of its colonial settlements had been destroyed or fallen into ruin. The islands were gradually resettled by Breton, Norman and Basque settlers, joined by various other peoples, particularly from Newfoundland. The colony's economy did not recover for another 35 years.

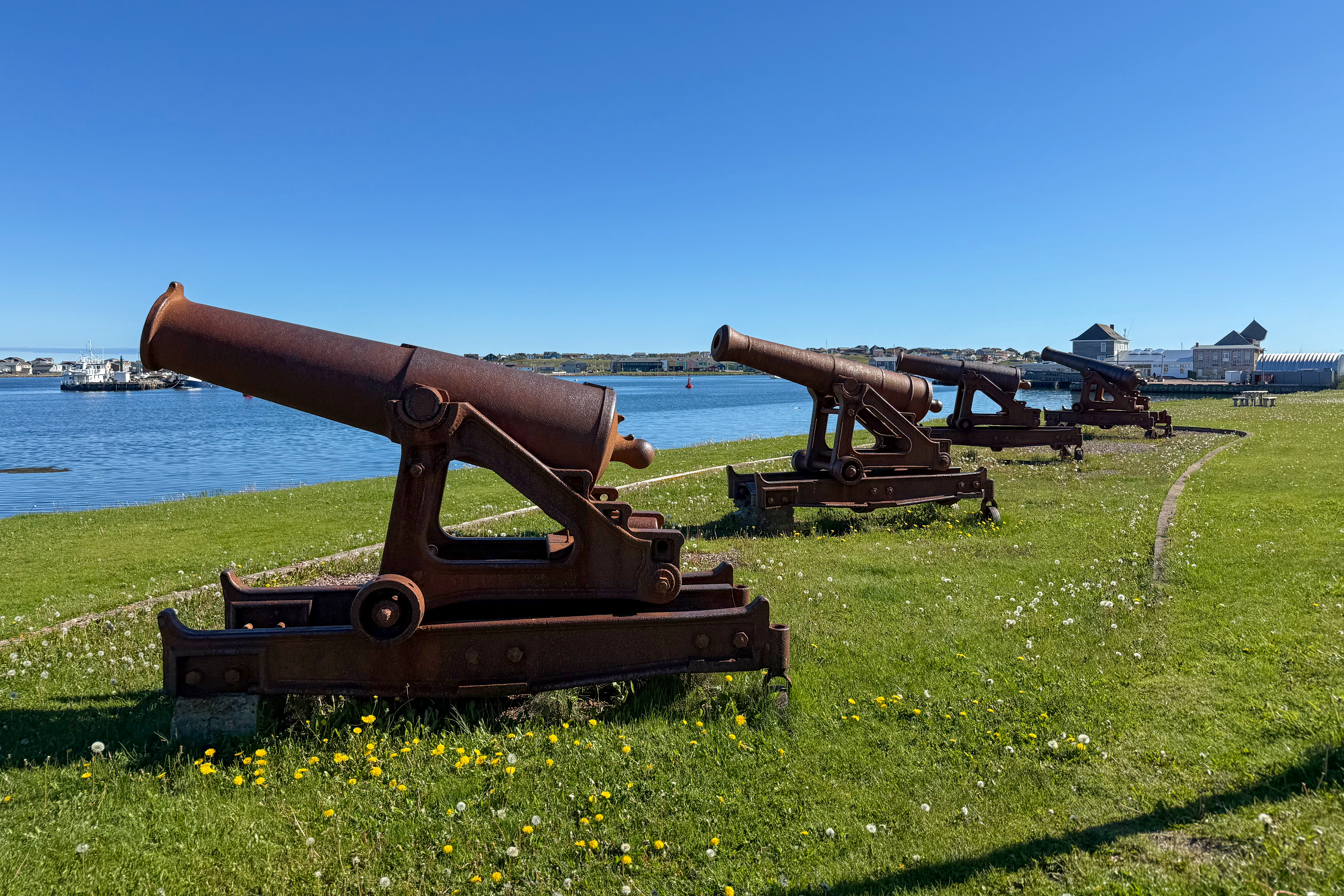
Cannons at Pointe aux Canons overlooking Saint Pierre Harbour

=== 1900–1945 ===
In 1903, the colony toyed with the idea of joining the United States, but nothing came of the idea. During the early 1910s, the colony suffered economic hardship as a result of unprofitable fisheries, and large numbers of its inhabitants emigrated to Nova Scotia and Quebec.

After the outbreak of World War I in 1914, the draft imposed by French authorities on all male inhabitants of conscription age crippled the fisheries, because their catch could not be processed by the older men or the women and children. About 400 men from the colony served in the French Armed Forces during the war, 100 of whom died. The increase in the adoption of steam fishing trawlers in the fisheries also contributed to the reduction in employment opportunities.

Smuggling had always been an important economic activity in the islands, but it became especially prominent with the institution of prohibition in the United States in January 1920. In 1931, The New York Times reported that the archipelago had imported 1,815,271 U.S. gallons (1,511,529 imperial gallons; 6,871,550 liters) of whisky from Canada in 12 months, most of which was smuggled into the United States. The end of prohibition in 1933 plunged the islands once more into economic depression.

During World War II, despite opposition from Canada, Britain, and the United States, Free French Forces seized the islands from Vichy France, to which the colony's administrator, Gilbert de Bournat, had pledged allegiance, on 24 December 1941. In referendums on both islands, the population endorsed Free France's takeover by over 98%.

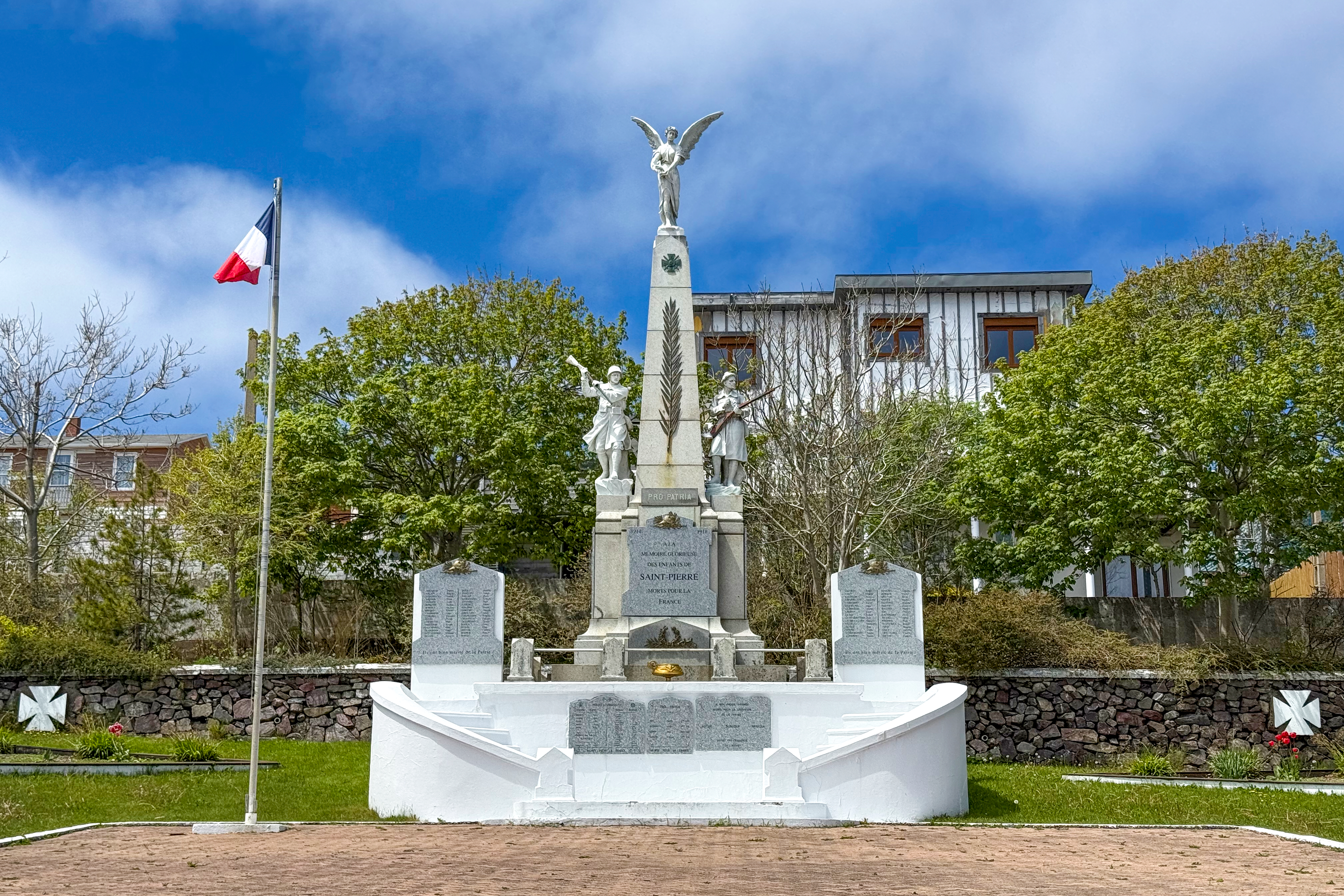
Saint Pierre war memorial, commemorating residents who died for France in both world wars

=== After 1945 ===
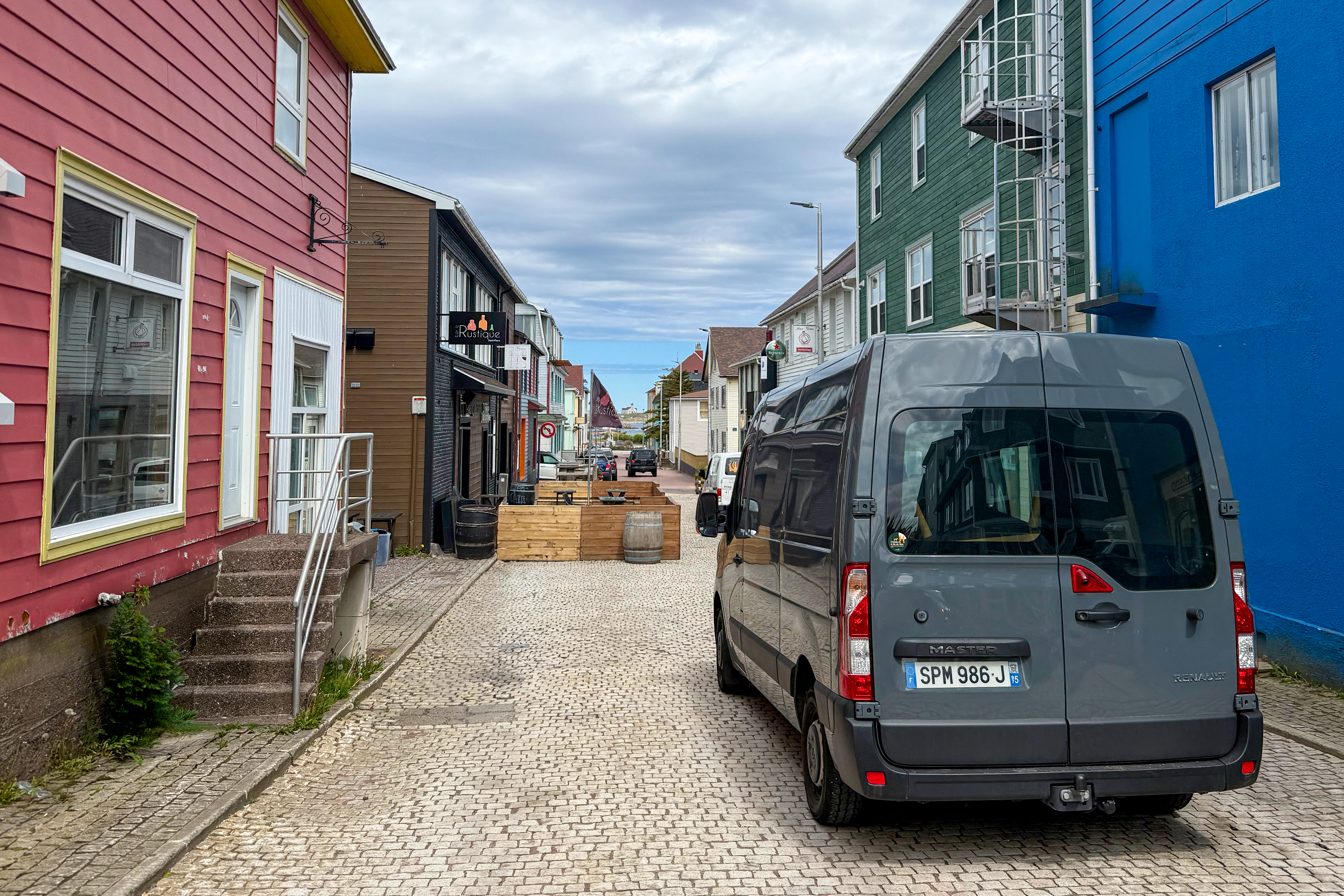
Rue Albert Briand in Saint Pierre, lined with bars and restaurants

The colony became a French overseas territory in 1946. After the 1958 French constitutional referendum, the territory of Saint Pierre and Miquelon was asked to choose one of three options: becoming fully integrated with France, becoming a self-governing state within the French Community, or preserving the status of an overseas territory; it decided to remain a territory. The archipelago became an overseas department on 19 July 1976, before acquiring the status of territorial collectivity on 11 June 1985, thus withdrawing from the European Communities.

== Geography ==
Located off the western end of the Newfoundland's Burin Peninsula, the archipelago of Saint Pierre and Miquelon comprises eight islands, totalling 242 square kilometres (93 mi^{2}); only two of the islands are inhabited. The islands are bare and rocky, with steep coasts, and only a thin layer of peat to soften the hard landscape. The islands, like Newfoundland, are geologically part of the northeastern end of the Appalachian Mountains.

Miquelon-Langlade, the largest island, is in fact composed of two islands; Miquelon Island (also called Grande Miquelon, 110 km^{2} or 42 mi^{2}) is connected to Langlade Island (Petite Miquelon, 91 km^{2} or 35 mi^{2}) by the Dune de Langlade (also known as the Isthme de Langlade), a 10-kilometre-long (6.2 mi) sandy tombolo. A storm severed them in the 18th century, separating the two islands for several decades, before currents reconstructed the isthmus. Morne de la Grande Montagne, the tallest point in the territory at 240 meters high, is located on Grande Miquelon. The waters between Langlade and Saint-Pierre were called "the Mouth of Hell" (French: Gueule d'Enfer) until about 1900, as more than 600 shipwrecks have been recorded in that point since 1800. In the north of Miquelon Island is the village of Miquelon-Langlade (710 inhabitants), while Langlade Island is almost deserted (only one inhabitant in the 1999 census).

Saint Pierre Island, whose area is smaller, 26 square kilometres (10 mi^{2}), is the most populous and the commercial and administrative center of the archipelago. Saint-Pierre Airport has been in operation since 1999 and is capable of accommodating long-haul flights from France.

A third, formerly inhabited island, Isle-aux-Marins, was known as Île-aux-Chiens until 1931. It is located a short distance from the port of Saint-Pierre, and has been uninhabited since 1963. The other main islands are Grand Colombier, Île aux Vainqueurs, and Île aux Pigeons.

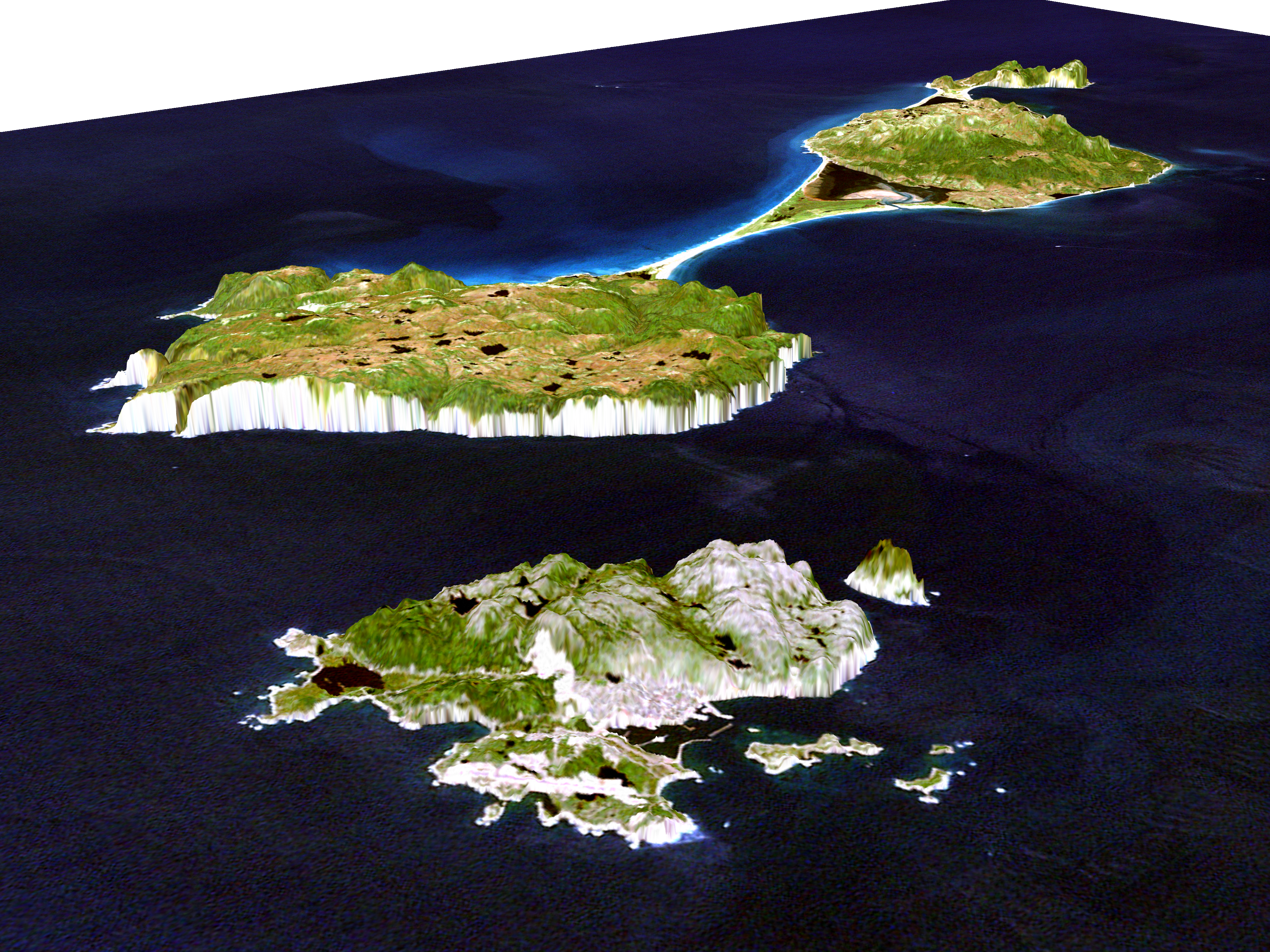
Vertically exaggerated model of the archipelago of Saint Pierre and Miquelon

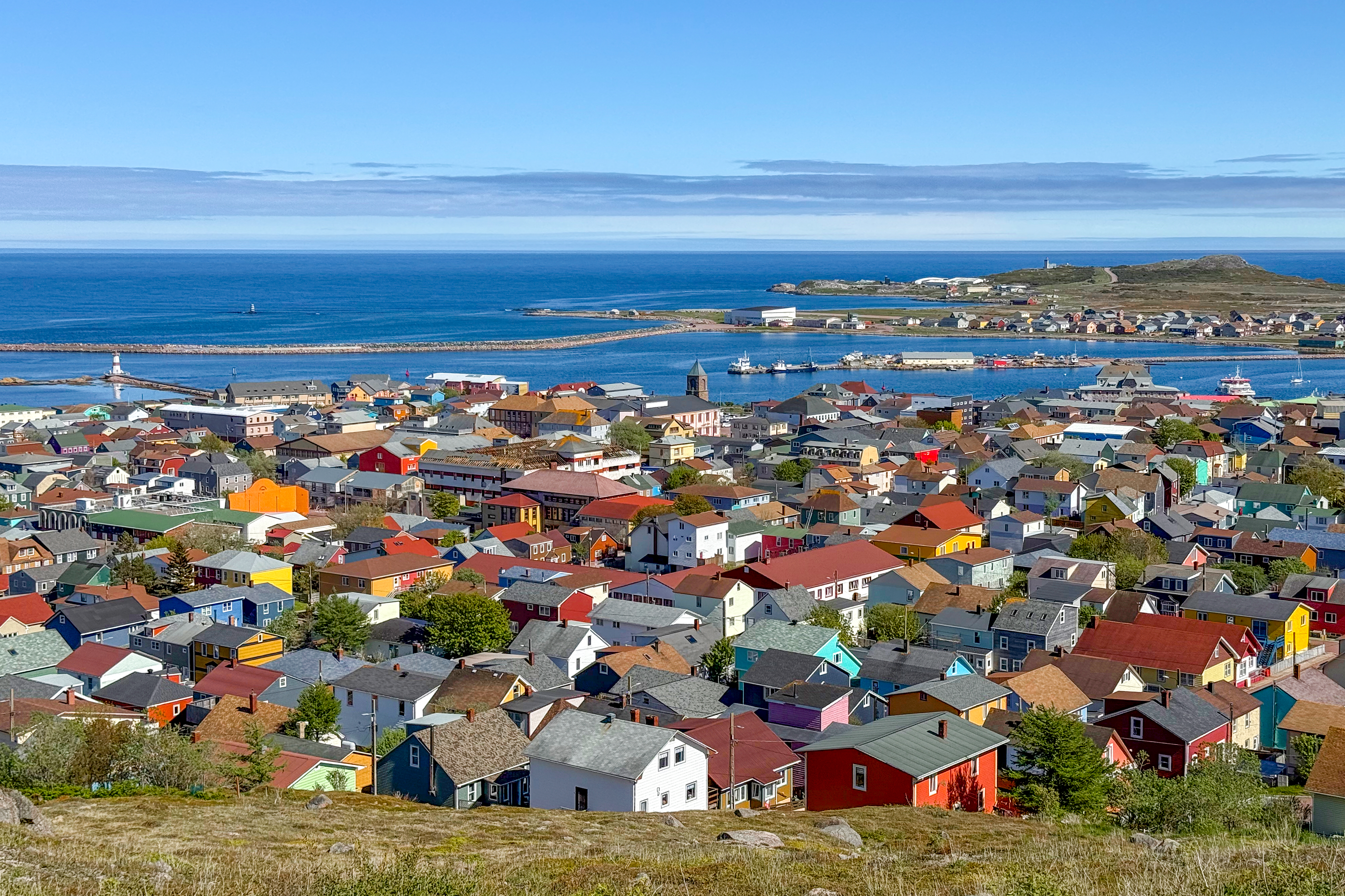
Saint Pierre village from the Observatoire de l’Anse à Pierre

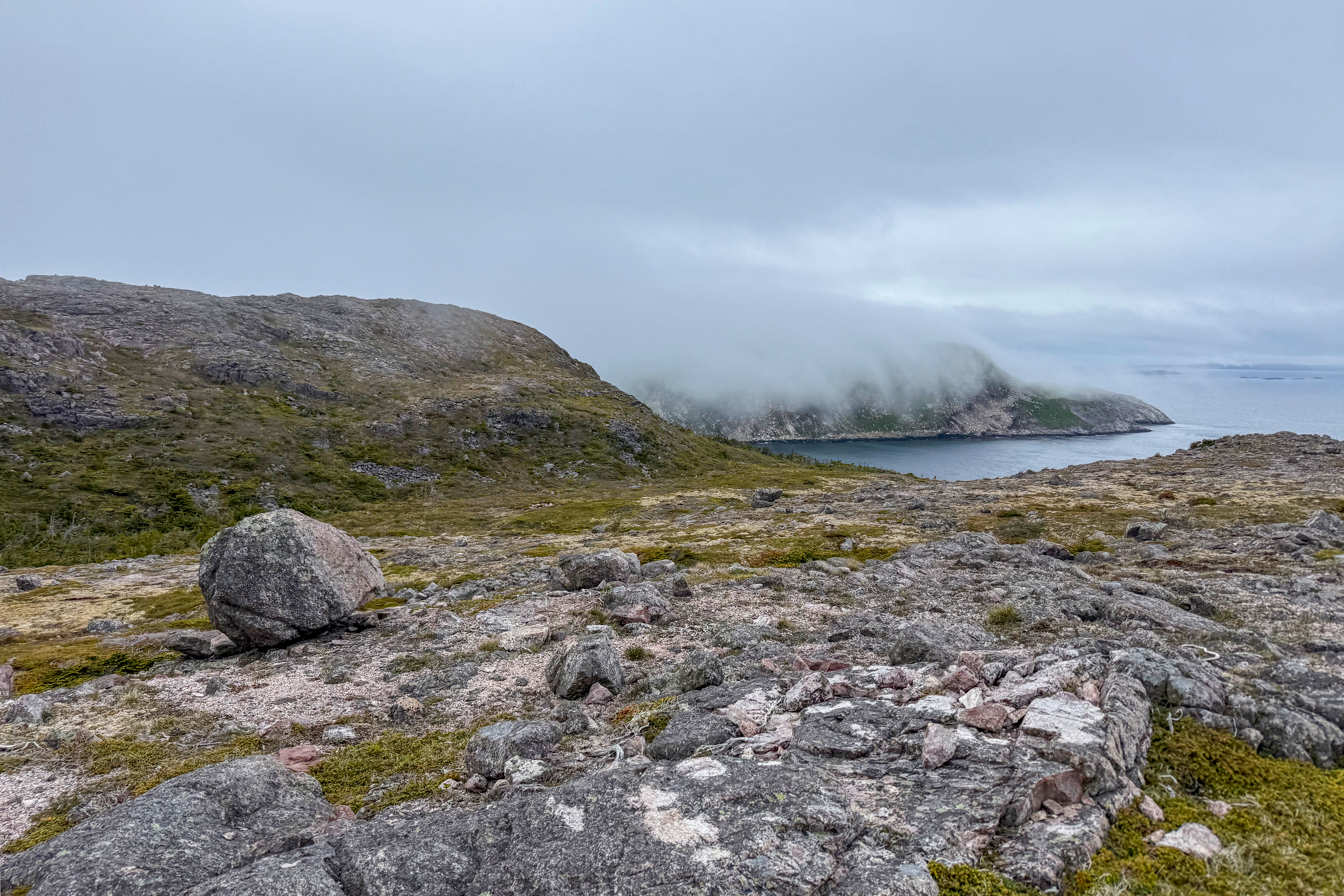
Rocky terrain outside Saint Pierre village, with Grand Colombier Island visible through offshore fog

=== Environment ===
Seabirds are the most common fauna. Seals and other wildlife can be found in the Grand Barachois Lagoon of Miquelon. Every spring, whales migrating to Greenland are visible off the coasts of Saint-Pierre and Miquelon. Trilobite fossils have been found on Langlade. The stone pillars off the island coasts called "L'anse aux Soldats" eroded away and disappeared in the 1970s. The rocky islands are barren, except for scrubby yews and junipers and thin volcanic soil. The forest cover of the hills, except in parts of Langlade, had been removed for fuel long ago.

=== Climate ===
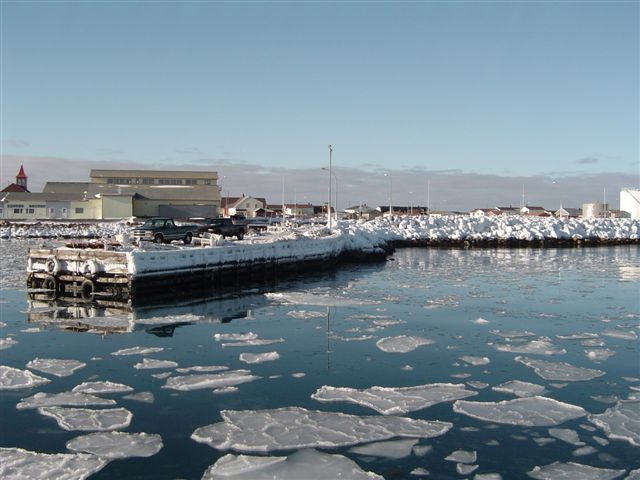
Port of Miquelon during the winter

In spite of being located at a similar latitude to the Bay of Biscay, the archipelago is characterized by a cold borderline humid continental/subarctic climate, under the influence of polar air masses and the cold Labrador Current. The mild winters for being a subarctic climate also means it has influences of subpolar oceanic climate, thus being at the confluence of three climatic types. The February mean is just below the −3 °C (27 °F) isotherm for that classification. Due to just three months being above 10 °C (50 °F) in mean temperatures and winter lows being so mild, Saint Pierre and Miquelon has a Köppen Climate Classification of Dfc, if bordering on Cfc due to the mildness of the winter and either Dfb or Cfb due to the closeness of the fourth-and fifth-warmest months to having mean temperatures at or above 10 °C (50 °F).

Typical maritime seasonal lag is also strong with September being warmer than June and March being colder than December. The average temperature is 5.3 °C (41.5 °F), with a temperature range of 19 °C (35 °F) between the warmest (15.7 °C (60.3 °F) in August) and coldest months (−3.6 °C (25.5 °F) in February). Precipitation is abundant (1,312 mm or 51.7 in per year) and regular (146 days per year), falling as snow and rain. Because of its location at the confluence of the cold waters of the Labrador Current and the warm waters of the Gulf Stream, the archipelago is also crossed a hundred days a year by fog banks, mainly in June and July.

Two other climatic elements are remarkable: the extremely variable winds and haze during the spring to early summer.

Comparison of local Meteorological data with other cities in France
Town	Sunshine (hours/yr)	Rain (mm/yr)	Snow (days/yr)	Storm (days/yr)	Fog (days/yr)
National average	1,973	770	14	22	40
Saint Pierre and Miquelon	1,427	1,323.5	99.0	6.6	100.8
Paris	1,661	637	12	18	10
Nice	2,724	767	1	29	1
Strasbourg	1,693	665	29	29	56
Brest	1,605	1,211	7	12	75

Climate data for St Pierre and Miquelon (1991–2020 averages, extremes 1941–present)
Month	Jan	Feb	Mar	Apr	May	Jun	Jul	Aug	Sep	Oct	Nov	Dec	Year
Record high °C (°F)	9.8 (49.6)	9.4 (48.9)	12.2 (54.0)	13.8 (56.8)	22.0 (71.6)	25.1 (77.2)	28.3 (82.9)	26.2 (79.2)	26.8 (80.2)	20.1 (68.2)	15.1 (59.2)	12.8 (55.0)	28.3 (82.9)
Mean daily maximum °C (°F)	0.2 (32.4)	−0.4 (31.3)	1.4 (34.5)	4.8 (40.6)	8.9 (48.0)	12.9 (55.2)	17.1 (62.8)	19.4 (66.9)	16.6 (61.9)	11.7 (53.1)	7.2 (45.0)	3.1 (37.6)	8.6 (47.5)
Daily mean °C (°F)	−2.4 (27.7)	−2.9 (26.8)	−1.1 (30.0)	2.1 (35.8)	5.9 (42.6)	9.9 (49.8)	14.4 (57.9)	16.8 (62.2)	14.0 (57.2)	9.3 (48.7)	4.8 (40.6)	0.8 (33.4)	6.0 (42.8)
Mean daily minimum °C (°F)	−4.9 (23.2)	−5.5 (22.1)	−3.5 (25.7)	−0.5 (31.1)	2.8 (37.0)	6.8 (44.2)	11.6 (52.9)	14.2 (57.6)	11.3 (52.3)	6.9 (44.4)	2.5 (36.5)	−1.5 (29.3)	3.4 (38.1)
Record low °C (°F)	−17.4 (0.7)	−18.7 (−1.7)	−18.1 (−0.6)	−9.8 (14.4)	−4.5 (23.9)	0.7 (33.3)	4.9 (40.8)	5.8 (42.4)	1.7 (35.1)	−2.6 (27.3)	−9.2 (15.4)	−14.6 (5.7)	−18.7 (−1.7)
Average precipitation mm (inches)	104.5 (4.11)	98.5 (3.88)	96.7 (3.81)	88.0 (3.46)	101.3 (3.99)	93.8 (3.69)	97.6 (3.84)	101.0 (3.98)	129.8 (5.11)	134.4 (5.29)	132.5 (5.22)	117.2 (4.61)	1,295.3 (51.00)
Average precipitation days (≥ 1.0mm)	15.7	14.0	11.5	10.4	10.5	9.9	10.1	10.1	9.9	12.8	14.4	15.3	144.6
Average rainy days	3.03	4.07	5.17	8.83	12.87	14.60	18.50	11.27	6.33	4.13	4.70	3.53	97.03
Average snowy days	22.63	19.00	15.25	7.36	0.89	0.04	0.0	0.0	0.0	1.00	4.40	3.20	73.77
Mean monthly sunshine hours	42.3	60.7	113.0	142.4	174.9	164.1	150.7	168.7	159.5	117.1	61.7	38.0	1,392.9
Source: Météo France (averages are for the period 1991–2020)

=== Environmental hazards ===
With recent concerns over rising water levels, houses are being created and people are moved to higher ground. Old and unused houses near the coast are removed for safety. In efforts to move residents, some have decided to stay near the coast.

== Government and politics ==
Bruno André
Prefect

Bernard Briand
President of the Territorial Council

Since March 2003, Saint Pierre and Miquelon has been an overseas collectivity with a special status. The archipelago has two communes: Saint-Pierre and Miquelon-Langlade. A third commune, Isle-aux-Marins, existed until 1945, when it was absorbed by the municipality of Saint-Pierre. The inhabitants possess French citizenship and suffrage. Saint Pierre and Miquelon sends a senator and a deputy to the National Assembly of France in Paris and enjoys a degree of autonomy concerning taxes, customs, and excise.

France appoints the prefect of Saint Pierre and Miquelon, who represents the national government in the territory. The prefect is in charge of national interests, law enforcement, public order, and, under the conditions set by the statute of 1985, administrative control. Since 21 August 2023, the prefect has been Bruno André.

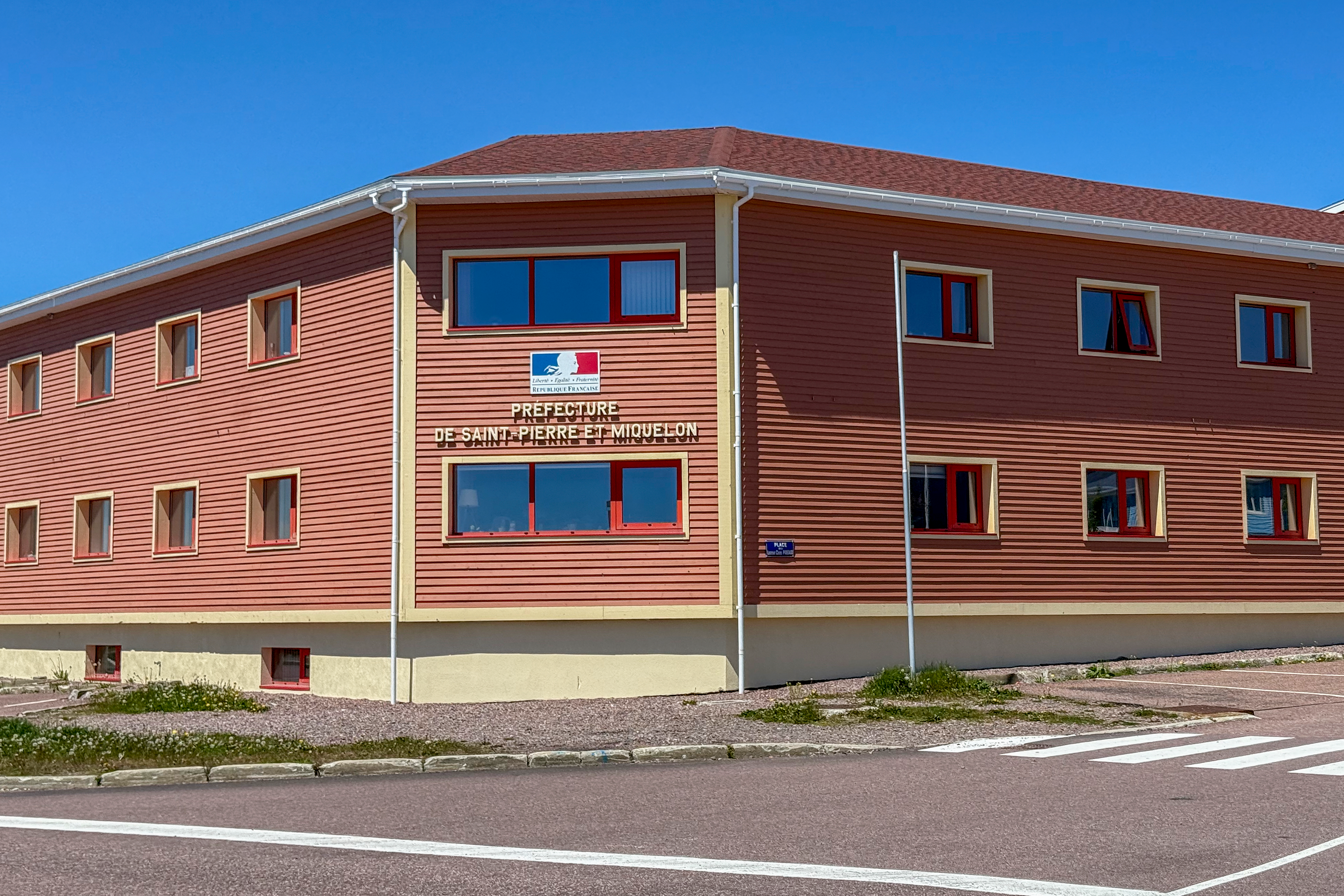
The Prefecture of Saint Pierre and Miquelon

The local legislative body, the Territorial Council (French: Conseil territorial), has 19 members: four councillors from Miquelon-Langlade and 15 from Saint-Pierre. The President of the Territorial Council is the head of a delegation of "France in the name of Saint Pierre and Miquelon" for international events such as the annual meetings of NAFO and ICCAT.

=== Defence and gendarmerie ===
France is responsible for the defence of the islands. The French Navy deploys the ex-trawler Fulmar in the territory for operations in both territorial and regional waters. Law enforcement in Saint Pierre and Miquelon is the responsibility of a branch of the French Gendarmerie Nationale; there are two police stations in the archipelago.

=== Maritime boundary case ===
Map of the exclusive economic zone of Saint Pierre and Miquelon

France claimed a 200-nautical-mile (370 km; 230 mi) exclusive economic zone for Saint-Pierre and Miquelon. Further, in August 1983, the naval ship Lieutenant de vaisseau Le Hénaff and the seismic ship Lucien Beaufort were sent to explore for oil in the disputed zone. In addition to the potential oil reserves, cod fishing rights on the Grand Banks of Newfoundland were at stake in the dispute. In the late 1980s, indications of declining fish stocks began to raise serious concern over the depletion of the fishery. In 1992, an arbitration panel awarded the islands an exclusive economic zone of 12,348 square kilometres (4,768 sq mi) to settle a longstanding territorial dispute with Canada, although it represents only 25% of what France had sought.

The 1992 decision fixed the maritime boundaries between Canada and the islands; it did not demarcate the continental shelf.

=== Fire services ===
Fire stations:

- Both airports, St Pierre and Miquelon, separately.
- Service incendie Ville de St Pierre – Caserne Renaissance has five apparatuses: two pumpers, aerial ladders and a hazmat. This replaced Caserne Daguerre.
- Service incendie Miquelon has four apparatuses: aerial, hazmat, two pumpers.

Most are second-hand units from North America; however, St Pierre acquired an aerial ladder from France in 2016.

== Economy ==
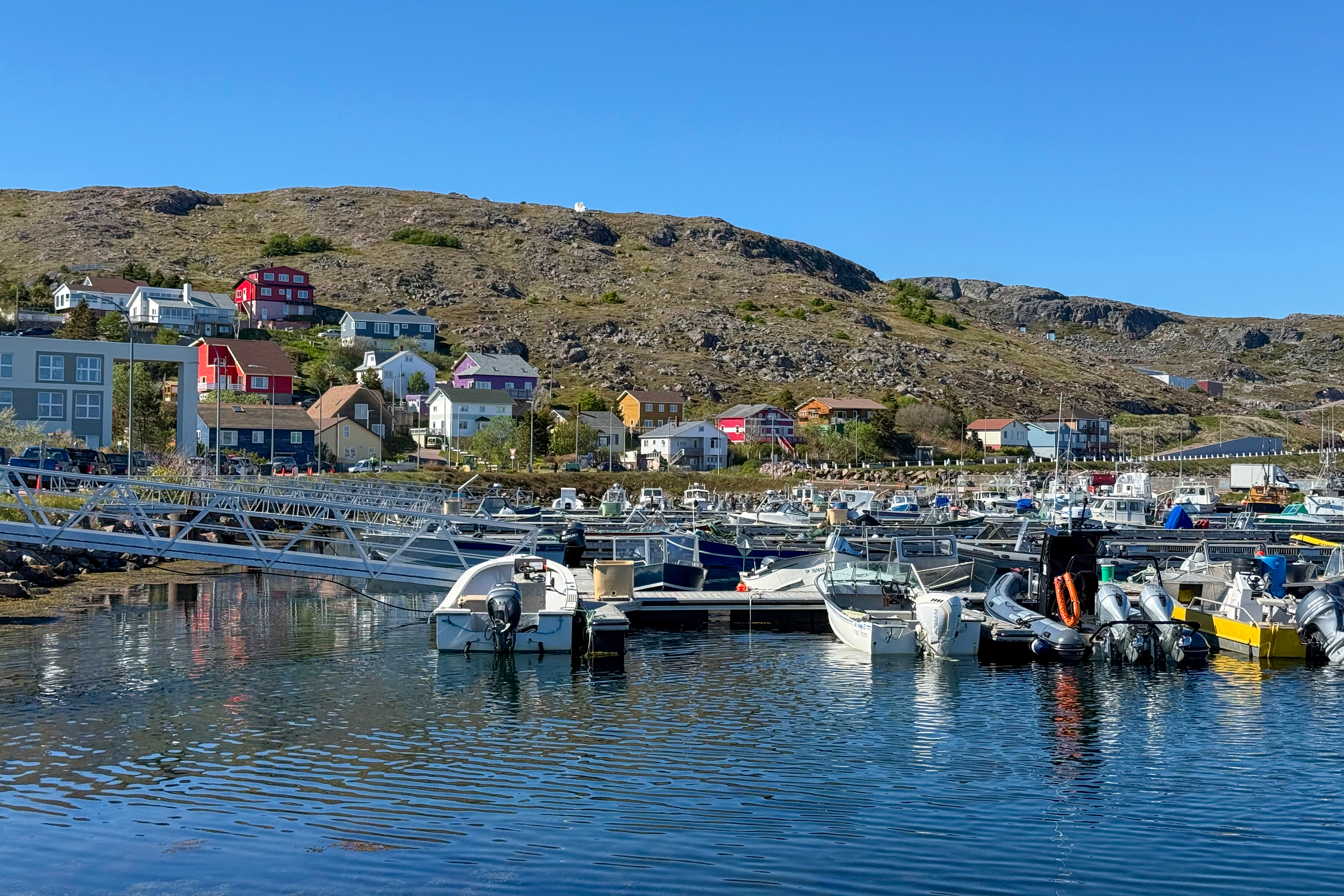
Fishing boats in Saint Pierre Harbour below the northeastern quarter of the village

Economy of Saint Pierre and Miquelon
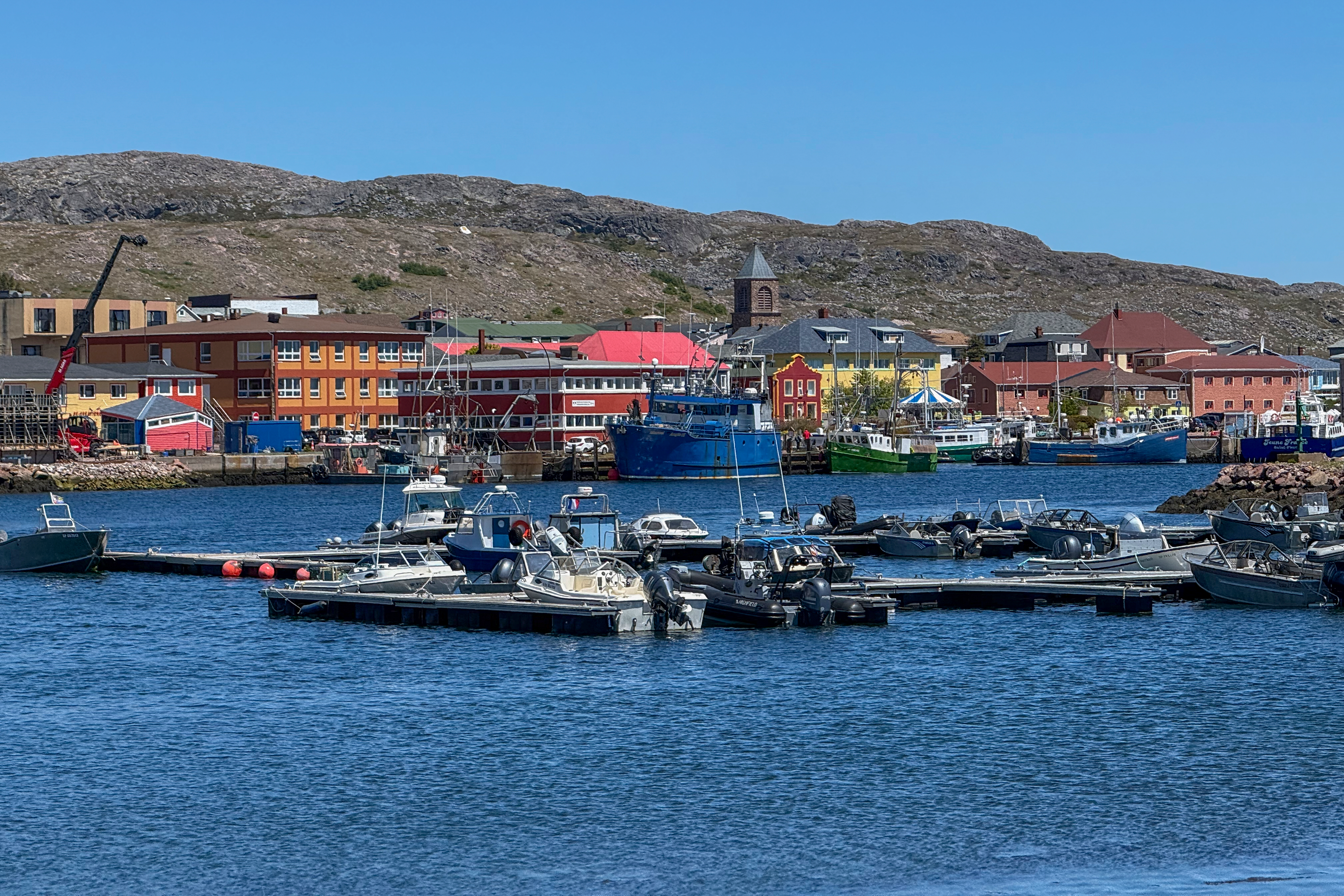
- Currency: Euro, Canadian Dollar
- Fiscal year: Calendar year

Statistics
- GDP: ▲$261.3 million (2015 est. PPP)
- GDP per capita: ▲$46,200 (2006 est.)
- GDP by sector: agriculture: 2%; industry: 15%; services: 83% (2006 est.)
- Inflation (CPI): ▼1.5% (2015 est.)
- Labour force: 4,429 (2015 est.)
- Labour force by occupation: agriculture: 18%; industry: 41%; services: 41% (1996 est.)
- Unemployment: ▼2.9% (2023 est.)

External
- Exports: ▲6.641 million (2010 est.)
- Export goods: fish and fish products, soybeans, animal feed, mollusks and crustaceans, fox and mink pelts
- Imports: ▲95.35 million (2010 est.)
- Import goods: meat, clothing, fuel, electrical equipment, machinery, building materials
- All values, unless otherwise stated, are in US dollars.

The economy of the islands, due to their location, has been dependent on fishing and servicing fishing fleets operating off the coast of Newfoundland. The economy has been declining, however, due to disputes with Canada over fishing quotas and a decline in the number of ships stopping at the islands. In 1992, an arbitration panel awarded the islands an exclusive economic zone of 12,348 square kilometres (4,768 sq mi) to settle a longstanding territorial dispute with Canada, although it represents only 25% of what France had sought. The islands are heavily subsidized by France, which benefits the standard of living. The government hopes an expansion of tourism will boost economic prospects, and test drilling for oil may pave the way for development of the energy sector.

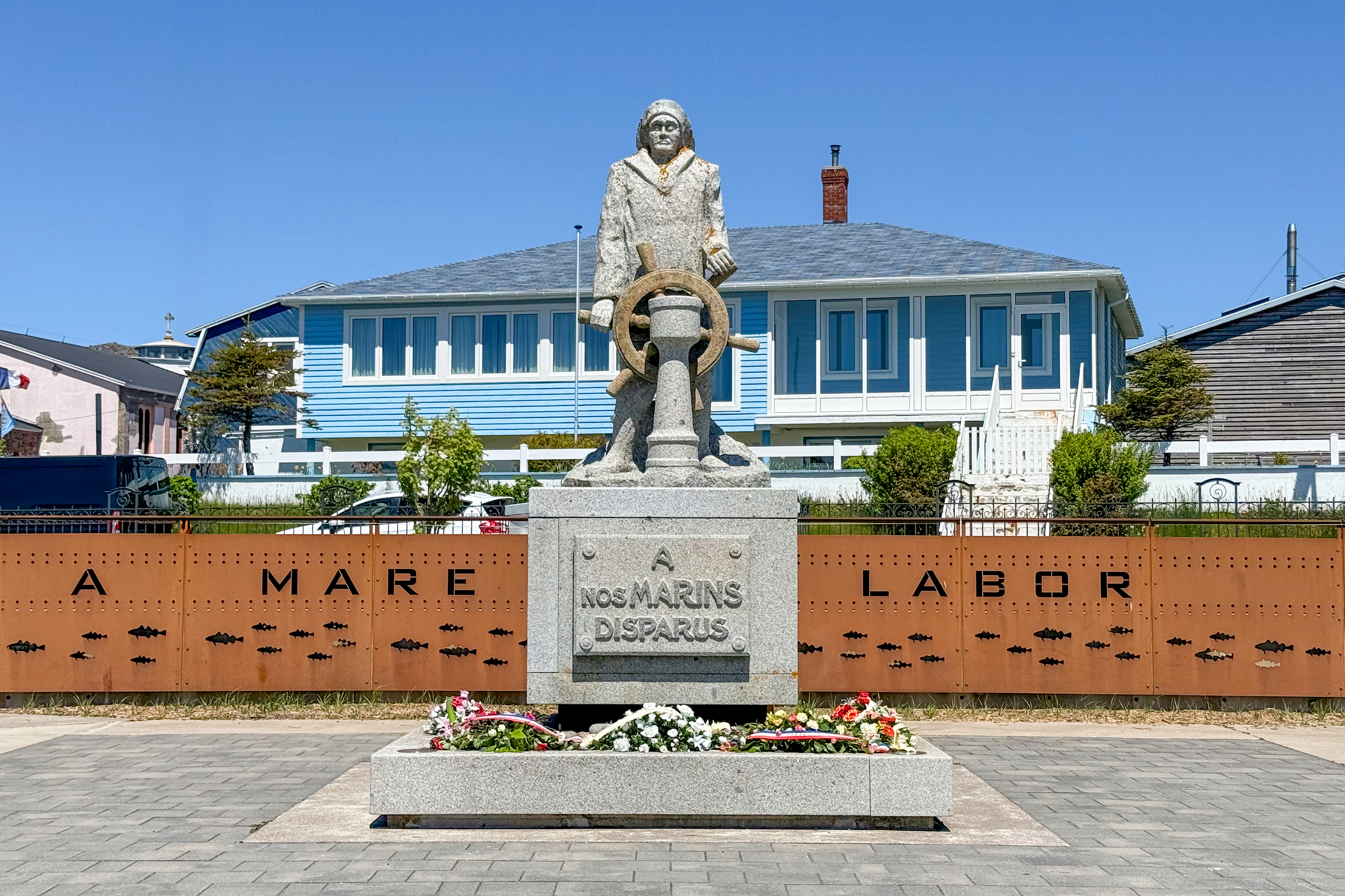
Monument to Saint Pierre’s sailors lost at sea in Square Joffre

=== Agriculture ===
The climate and the small amount of available land militate against activities such as farming and livestock raising (weather conditions are severe, confining the growing season to a few weeks, and the soil contains significant peat and clay and is largely infertile). Since 1992, the economy has been in steep decline, following the depletion of fish stocks due to overfishing, the limitation of fishing areas and the ban imposed on all cod fishing by the Canadian Government.

=== Unemployment ===
The labour market is characterized by high seasonality, due to climatic hazards. Traditionally, the inhabitants suspended all outdoor activities (construction, agriculture, etc.) between December and April. In 1999, the unemployment rate was 12.8%, and a third of the employed worked in the public sector. The employment situation was worsened by the complete cessation of deep-sea fishing, the traditional occupation of the islanders, as the unemployment rate in 1990 was lower at 9.5%. The unemployment for 2010 shows a decrease from 2009, from 7.7% to 7.1%. Exports are very low (5.1% of GDP) while imports are significant (49.1% of GDP). In 2023, the unemployment rate in Saint-Pierre-et-Miquelon was 2.9%. About 70% of the islands' supplies are imported from Canada or from other parts of France via Nova Scotia.

=== Diversification ===
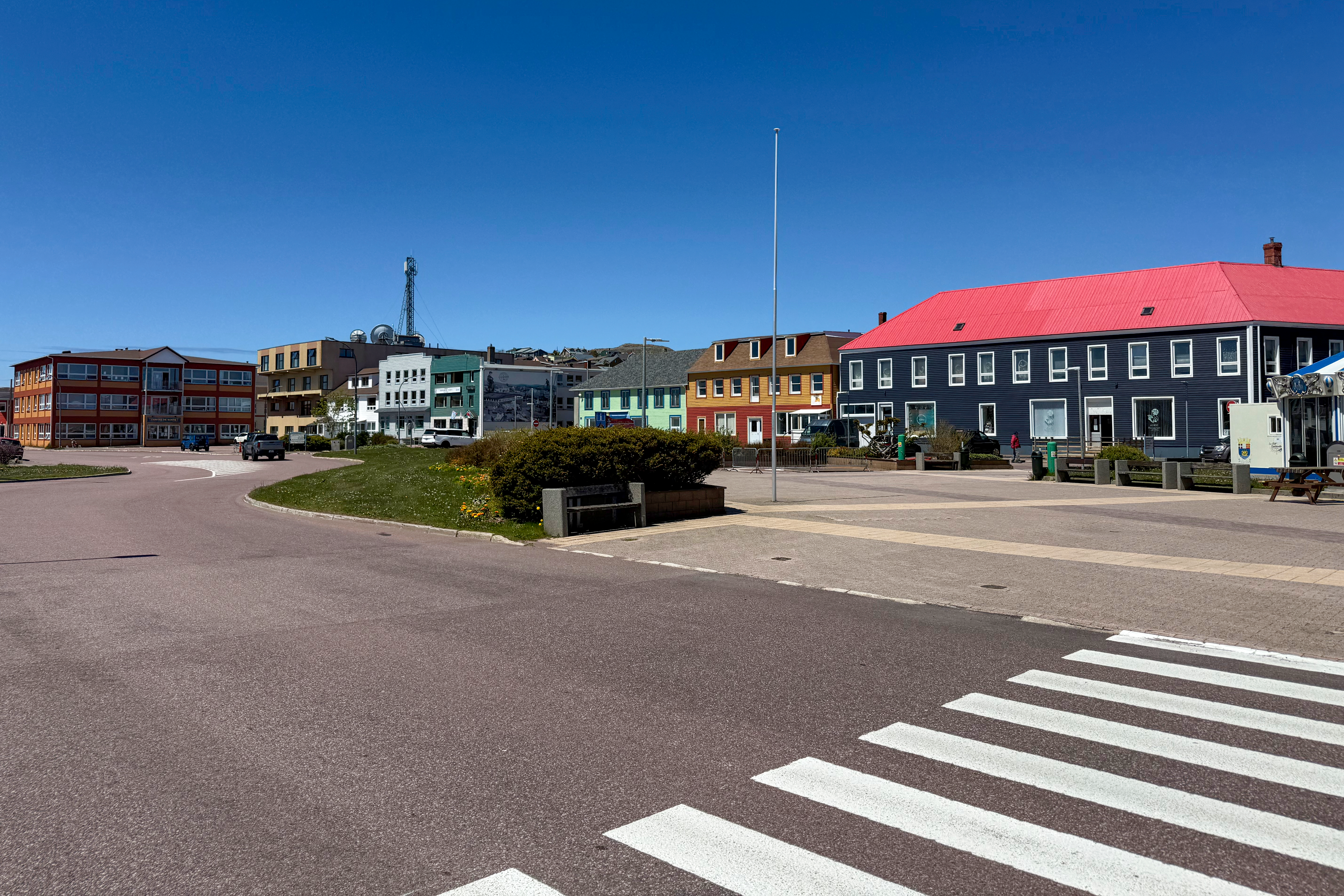
Place du Général-de-Gaulle in Saint Pierre

The rise in unemployment has been countered by state financial aid for the retraining of businesses and individuals. The construction of the airport in 1999 helped sustain activity in the construction industry and public works. Fish farming, crab fishing and agriculture are being developed to diversify the local economy. The future of Saint Pierre and Miquelon rests on tourism, fisheries and aquaculture. Explorations are under way to exploit deposits of oil and gas. Tourism benefits from the proximity to similar tourist areas of Canada. Distribution, public service, care, minor wholesale, retail and crafts are notable in the business sector.

=== Tourism ===
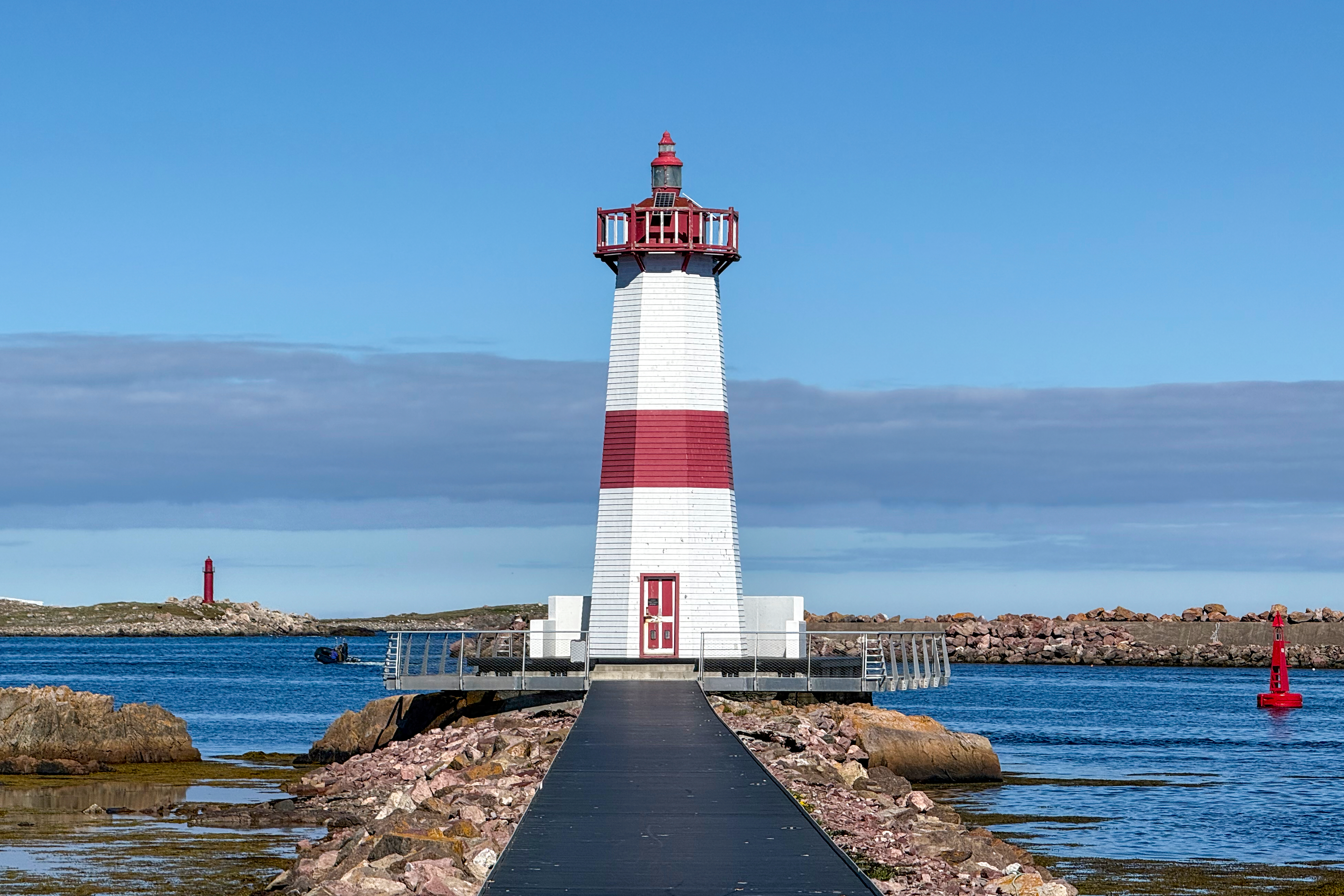
Pointe aux Canons lighthouse in Saint Pierre

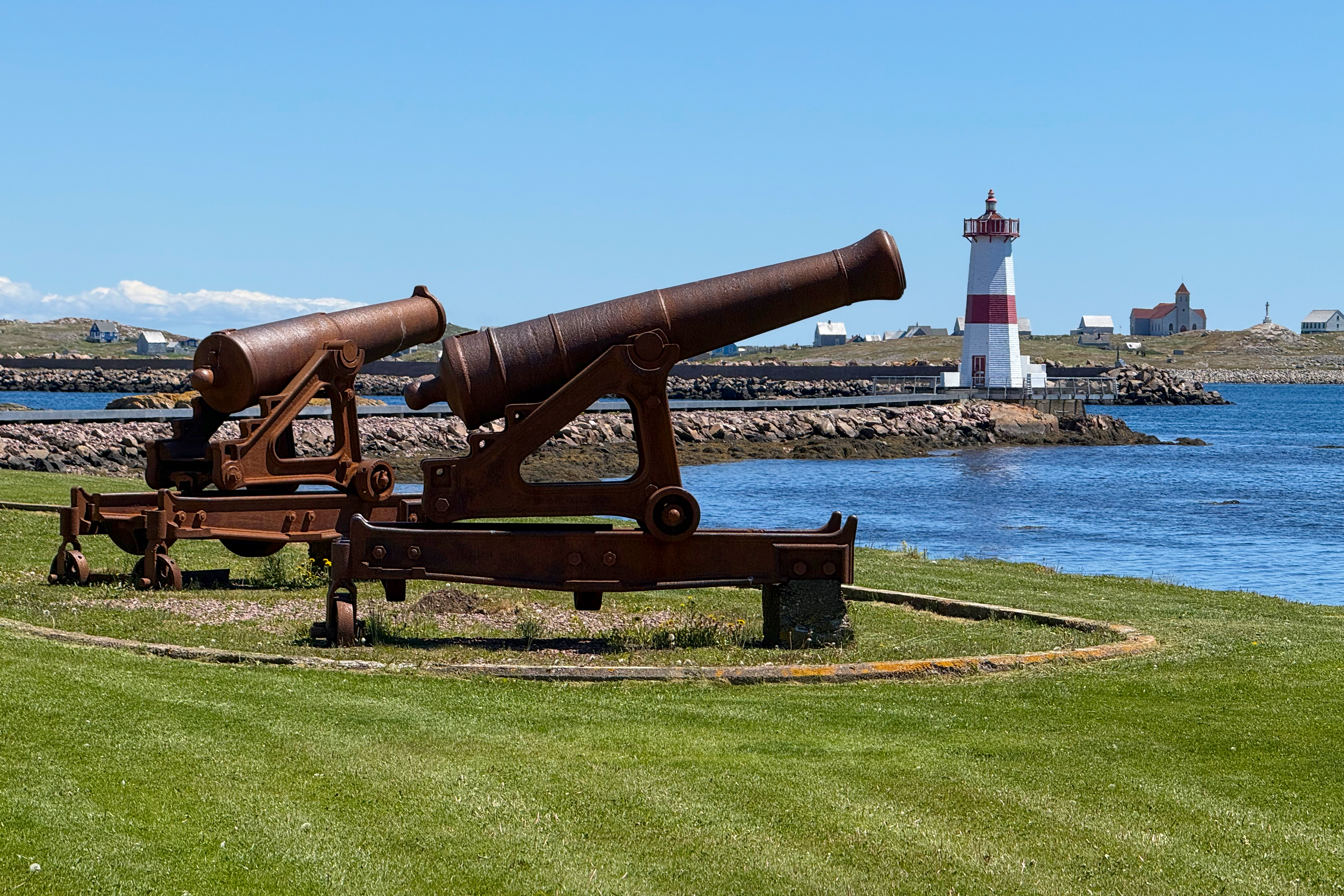
Cannons at Pointe aux Canons in Saint Pierre

Tourism is increasingly important and the territory capitalises on its image as "France in North America".

There are, as of mid-2024, six hotels on Saint-Pierre as well as B&Bs and Airbnb rentals on both main islands.

As of mid-2024, there are 13 restaurants and bistros on Saint-Pierre and one on Île aux Marins; further, the islands' tourism bureau promotes their authentic French cuisine as well as other cuisines.

=== Currency ===
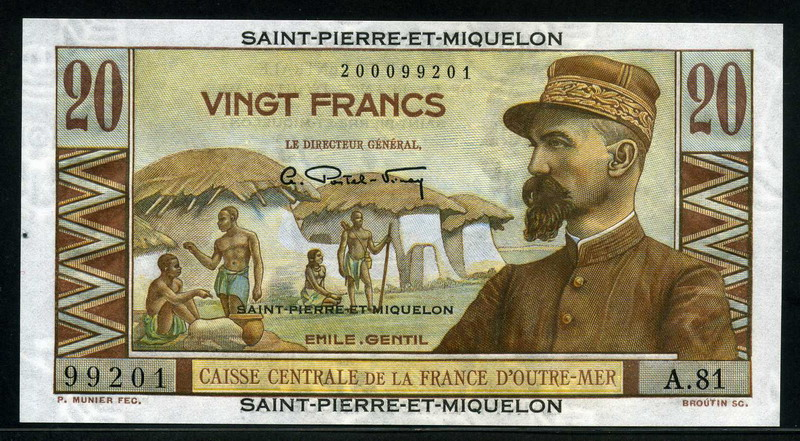
20-CFA-franc banknote

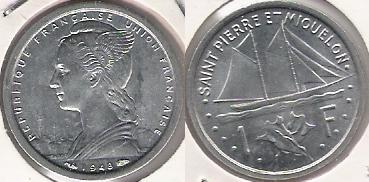
A 1948 Aluminum Franc coin

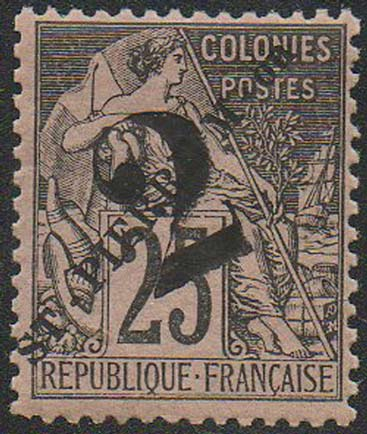
1891 postage stamp

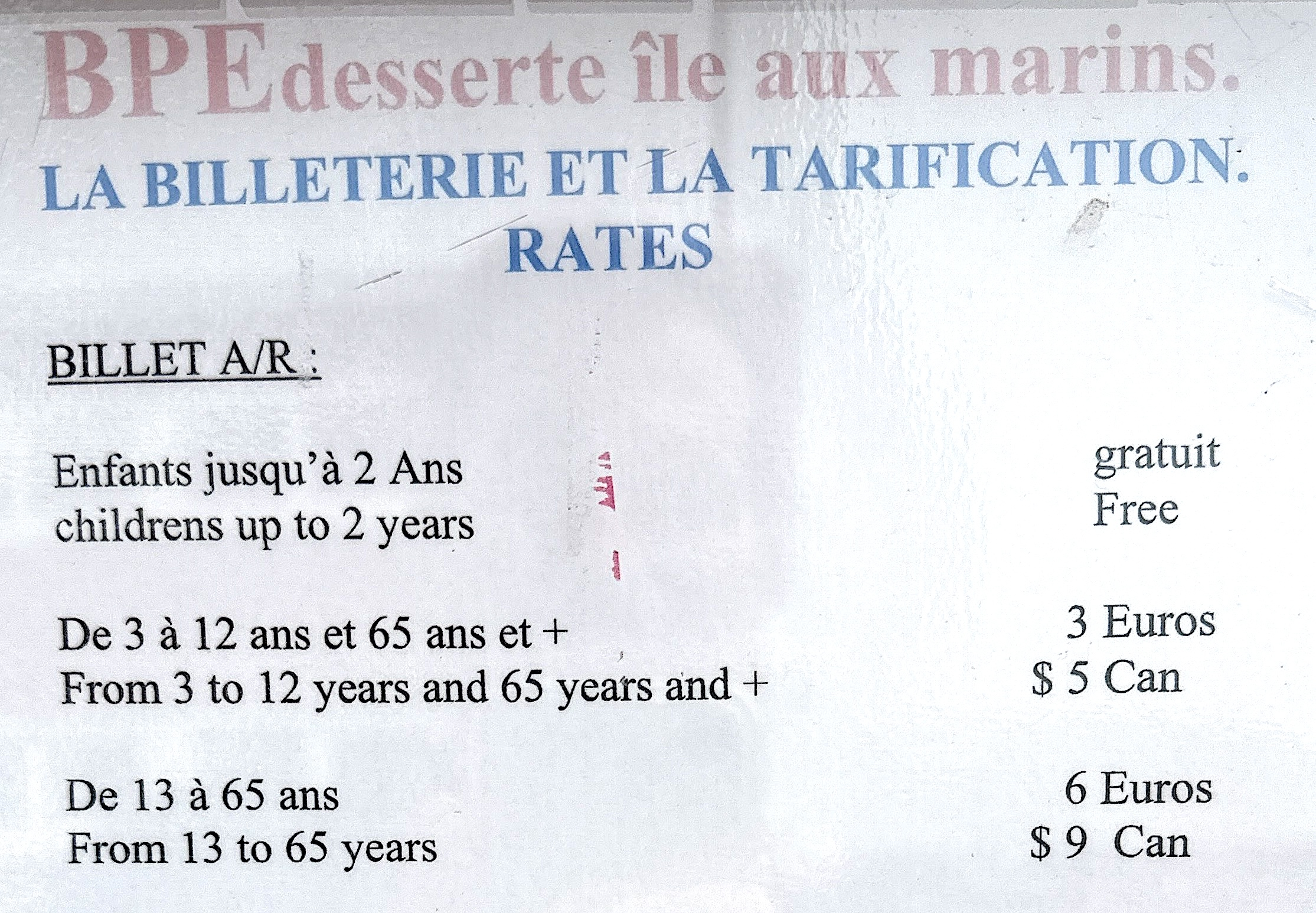
Price list for a ferry, July 2024. A 3-euro ticket may be paid with 5 CAD, 11–13% higher than at the interbank rate during that month, where 1 euro equaled between 1.47 and 1.50 CAD.

The euro has been the official currency in Saint Pierre and Miquelon since 1 January 1999, while the euro coins and banknotes were introduced on 1 January 2002, in tandem with Metropolitan France.

Before 1890, Mexican dubloons and Canadian dollars both circulated on the islands. Starting in 1889, these were supplemented with local franc banknotes from the Banque des Îles Saint-Pierre-et-Miquelon until the end of World War One.

In 1945, the island started using the CFA franc, which otherwise was used by the French colonies in Africa. CFA banknotes issued by the Caisse Centrale de la France d'Outre-Mer stamped with the text "Saint Pierre et Miquelon".

In 1973, these were replaced with the ("regular") new French franc, which had been in use in Metropolitan France since 1960, equal to 100 pre-1960 French francs. The Institut d'Émission des Départements d'Outre-Mer (IEDOM), the French public institution responsible for issuing currency in the overseas territories that used the French franc and later the euro on behalf of the Bank of France, has had an agency in Saint Pierre since 1978.

Most businesses accept Canadian dollars (CAD), at a rate below the interbank exchange rate; prices in euros and change would be given in that currency.

=== Stamps ===
The islands have issued their own stamps from 1885 to the present, except for a period between 1 April 1978 and 3 February 1986 when French stamps not specific to Saint Pierre and Miquelon were used.

=== Transportation ===
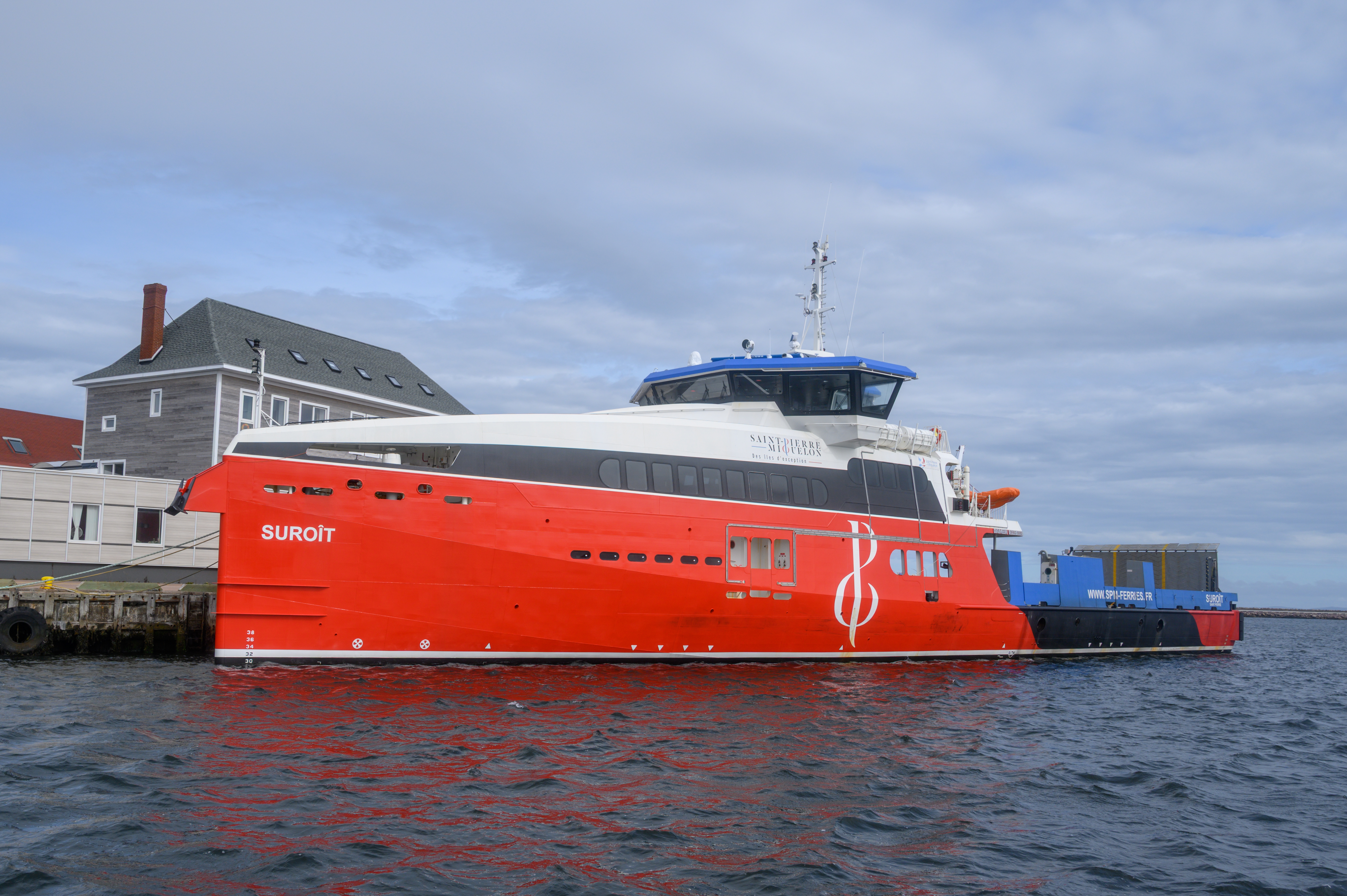
SPM Ferries' Suroit, serving the Fortune–Saint-Pierre route, at SPM ferry dock in Saint-Pierre

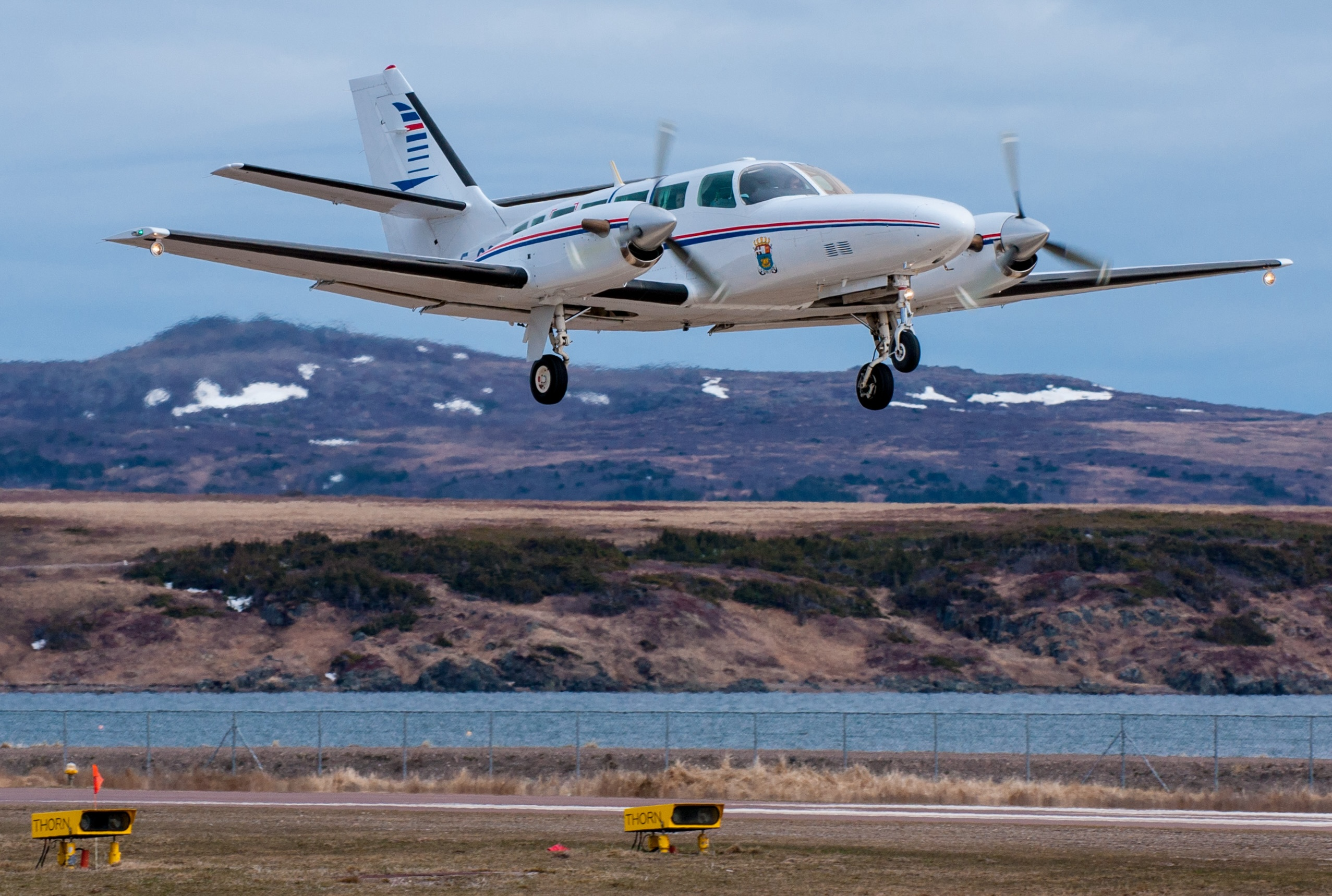
Air Saint-Pierre aircraft taking off from Miquelon Airport

Saint-Pierre and Miquelon has 114 km (71 mi) of highways plus 45 km (28 mi) of unpaved roads. Its only major harbour is at Saint-Pierre although there is a smaller harbour at Miquelon. The collectivity has no merchant marine but has two airports; the runway at Saint-Pierre Airport is 1,800 metres (5,910 ft) long, and at Miquelon Airport, 1,000 metres (3,280 ft). Ferry services connect the islands with each other and with Fortune on Newfoundland in Canada, 45 km away; crossings take 90 minutes. Saint Pierre and Miquelon no longer have any functioning railways.

==== Ferries ====
Ferry terminal	Ferry terminal	Ferry company	Summer frequency (2024)
Fortune	Saint-Pierre	SPM Ferries	Service 1–2 times per day; no service on Mondays.
Miquelon town, Miquelon-Langlade island	Saint-Pierre	SPM Ferries	Service 1–2 times per day; no service on Wednesdays
Langlade, Miquelon-Langlade island	Saint-Pierre	SPM Ferries	Service 1–2 times per day; no service on Tuesdays.
Île aux Marins	Saint-Pierre	BPE	6 daytime crossings daily, in summer half-hourly daytime service

Ferry services operated by SPM Ferries connect Saint Pierre with Miquelon town and Langlade, and both Saint Pierre and Miquelon towns with the port of Fortune on Newfoundland in Canada. In the summer, additional services operate between St Pierre and Langlade and between Miquelon and Fortune. SPM Ferries's Nordet and Suroît ferries can transport up to 188 passengers and 18 vehicles each. Jeune France is a smaller ferry serving seasonal local service between St. Pierre and Langlade. The ship arrived in 2012 replacing Saint-George XII, and currently is used for tours.

Several cruise ship lines visit Saint-Pierre. They dock 2 km northeast of downtown, near the end of the coastal road. Boats also provide access to Ile aux Marins.

Between 2005 and 2009, Atlantic Jet provided a ferry service to the islands from Canada, operated privately by SPM Express SA. It was replaced by the Arethusa, but the service was terminated in 2010 when the island opted to form a government-run ferry service. Due to COVID-19 restrictions, services to Fortune were suspended between March 2020 and August 2021.

==== Air transport ====
There are two airports on the islands: Saint-Pierre Pointe-Blanche Airport (IATA: FSP, ICAO: LFVP) and Miquelon Airport (IATA: MQC, ICAO: LFVM).

Air transport is provided by Air Saint-Pierre which directly connects Saint-Pierre Pointe-Blanche Airport with:

- Miquelon Airport, one of the shortest scheduled airline routes in the world in terms of distance and flight duration
- Montreal–Trudeau (YUL) in Quebec, Halifax (YHZ) in Nova Scotia, and Saint John's (YYT) in Newfoundland, Canada
- Îles-de-la-Madeleine Airport (YGR), Quebec, seasonally
- Paris-Charles de Gaulle Airport (CDG) in mainland France; Air Saint-Pierre contracts with ASL Airlines France to operate that flight

===== Connections with mainland France =====
For many years there was no direct air link between Saint Pierre and mainland France, but in summer 2018, Air Saint-Pierre began direct flights to and from Paris during the summer.

Other than that option, travel to France requires a transfer, most commonly at Montreal–Trudeau, which has service:

- with Air Canada to Paris–CDG, Lyon, Toulouse, and Nice;
- with Air France to Paris–CDG;
- with Air Transat to Bordeaux, Lyon, Marseille, Nantes, Nice, Toulouse and Paris–CDG; and
- with French Bee to Paris-Orly.

There are other connections to mainland France: WestJet provides seasonal flights to Paris-CDG from both Halifax and St. John's.

==== Car transport ====
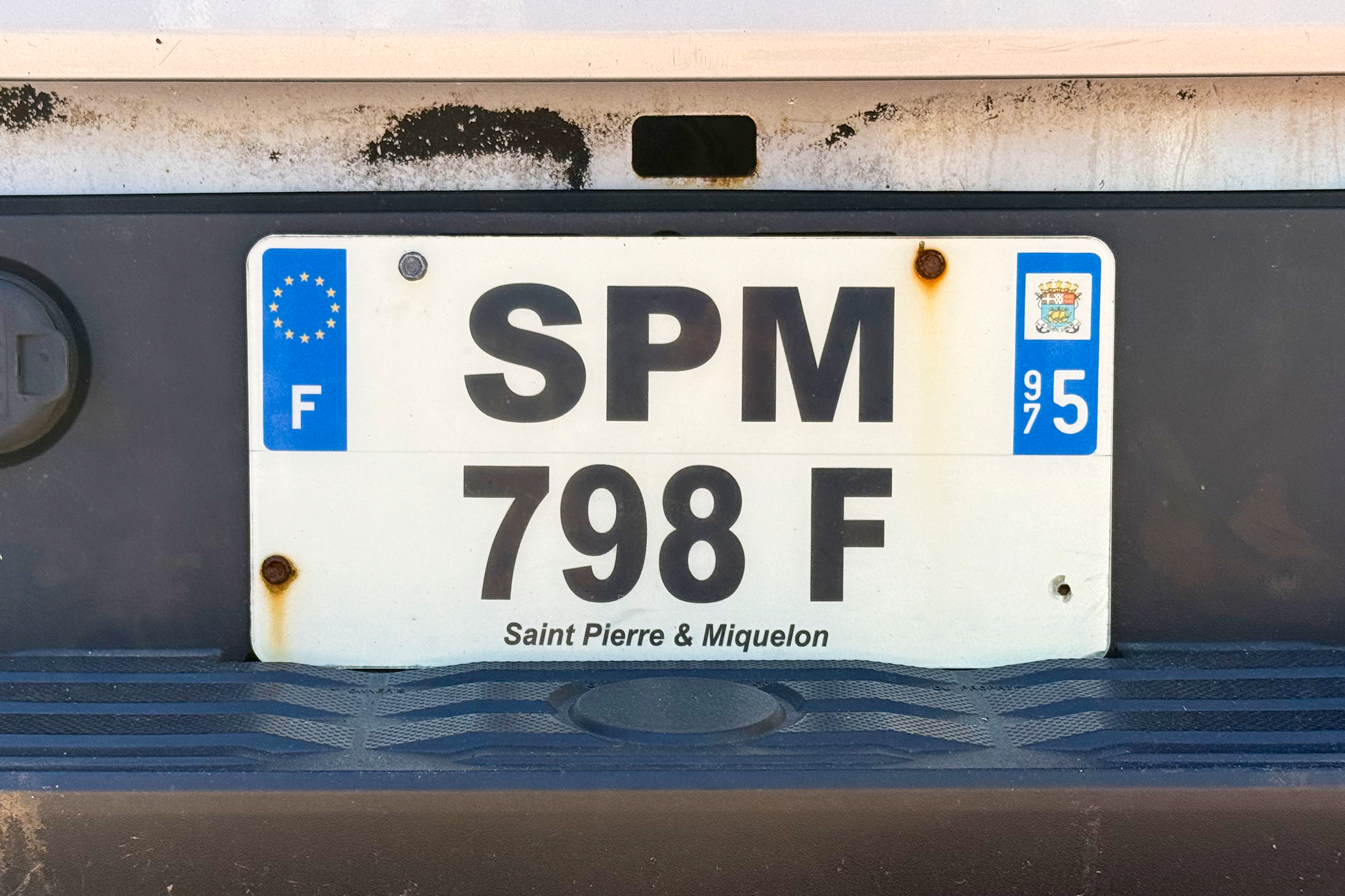
North American-format license plate in Saint Pierre, bearing the territorial code 975. European-sized plates are also issued to suit cars brought over from Europe.

In the past, Saint Pierre and Miquelon used only standard French vehicle registration plates, rather than plates in the format of six inches (150 mm) high by twelve inches (300 mm) wide used by most other jurisdictions in North America. More recently however, American vehicles with North American plates are becoming more common; this has increased since the new car ferry service to Canada began in 2021.

The islands do not follow the standard French numbering system. Until 1952, cars were simply numbered from 1 onwards, without any code to identify them as being from Saint Pierre and Miquelon. Beginning in 1952, they had serial numbers followed by the letters SPM; for example, 9287 SPM. Since 2000, all numbers have begun with the letters SPM followed by a serial number and serial letter, e.g. SPM 1 A.

Road signs are in French and are European influenced.

=== Communications ===
Saint-Pierre and Miquelon have four radio stations; all stations operate on the FM band, with the last stations converted from the AM band in 2004. Three of the stations are on Saint-Pierre, two of which are owned by La Première, along with one La Première station on Miquelon. At night, these stations broadcast France Inter or France Info. The other station (Radio Atlantique) is an affiliate of Radio France Internationale. The archipelago is linked to North America and Europe by satellite communications for telephone and television service.

The archipelago is also home to the Saint Pierre et Miquelon Galileo Sensor Station (GSS), operated by the European Union and its space programme agency (EUSPA) for the European satellite positioning systems Galileo and EGNOS. It is the only Galileo installation in North America. On the other hand, another EGNOS station is located in Moncton, Canada; however, this is due to be replaced by the facilities in Saint Pierre et Miquelon.

The department of Saint-Pierre and Miquelon is served by one television station: Saint Pierre and Miquelon La Première (call sign FQN) on Channel 1. Before the conversion to the DVB-T standard for digital television broadcasts on 29 November 2011, Saint-Pierre and Miquelon used the French analog SECAM-K1 standard. Further, the local telecommunications provider (SPM Telecom) carried many North American television stations and cable channels; the channels were converted from North America's analog NTSC standard. In addition, Saint-Pierre-et-Miquelon La Première was carried on Shaw Direct satellite and most digital cable services in Canada, converted to NTSC.

SPM Telecom is also the department's main internet service provider. Its internet service being named Cheznoo; this is a play on "chez-nous," French for "our place." SPM Telecom also offers cellular phone and mobile phone service (for phones that adhere to the GSM standard). SPM Telecom uses the GSM 900 MHz band, which is different from the GSM 850 MHz and 1900 MHz bands used in the rest of North America.

The islands are a separate country-level entity among many radio amateurs; it is identifiable with ITU prefix "FP". Those visiting, mainly from the US, activate Saint-Pierre and Miquelon every year. Amateurs collect records of contacts with these stations for Islands on the Air and DX Century Club awards; the Atlantic coast gives takeoff for shortwaves. A few kilometres away is Signal Hill, St. John's which first communicated across the Atlantic, namely with Marconi's Poldhu Wireless Station in England.

==== News ====
SPM Telecom publishes local news online at the Cheznoo web portal. Other publications include the magazine "Mathurin". The Saint Pierre and Miquelon La Première television channel provides a news program every evening at 8pm, called "Le Journal".

== Demographics ==
Historical populations
Year	Pop.	±%
1847	1,665	—
1860	2,916	+75.1%
1870	4,750	+62.9%
1897	6,352	+33.7%
1902	6,842	+7.7%
1907	4,760	−30.4%
1911	4,209	−11.6%
1921	3,918	−6.9%
1926	4,030	+2.9%
1931	4,321	+7.2%
1936	4,175	−3.4%
1945	4,354	+4.3%
1951	4,606	+5.8%
1957	4,879	+5.9%
1962	5,025	+3.0%
1967	5,235	+4.2%
1974	5,840	+11.6%
1982	6,041	+3.4%
1990	6,277	+3.9%
1999	6,316	+0.6%
2006	6,125	−3.0%
2011	6,080	−0.7%
2016	6,008	−1.2%
2022	5,819	−3.1%
INSEE (1847–1962; 1967–2011; 2016; 2022)

The total population of the islands at the March 2022 census was 5,819, of which 5,223 lived in Saint-Pierre and 596 in Miquelon-Langlade. At the time of the 1999 census, 76% of the population was born on the archipelago, while 16.1% were born in metropolitan France, a sharp increase from the 10.2% in 1990. In the same census, less than 1% of the population reported being a foreign national.

The archipelago has a high emigration rate, especially among young adults, who often leave for their studies without returning afterwards. Even at the time of the great prosperity of the cod fishery, the population growth had always been constrained by the geographic remoteness, harsh climate and infertile soils.

=== Ethnography ===
Ruins show that Indigenous American people visited the archipelago on fishing and hunting expeditions before it was settled by Europeans. The current population is the result of inflows of settlers from the French ports, mostly Normans, Basques, Bretons and Saintongeais, and also from the historic area of Acadia in Canada (Gaspé Peninsula, parts of New Brunswick, Prince Edward Island and Cape Breton) as well as Francophones who settled on the Port au Port Peninsula on Newfoundland.

=== Languages ===
The inhabitants speak French; their customs and traditions are similar to those found in metropolitan France. The French spoken on the archipelago is closer to Metropolitan French than to Canadian French and maintains a number of unique features. Basque, formerly spoken in private settings by people of Basque ancestry, had disappeared from the islands by the late 1950s.

=== Religion ===
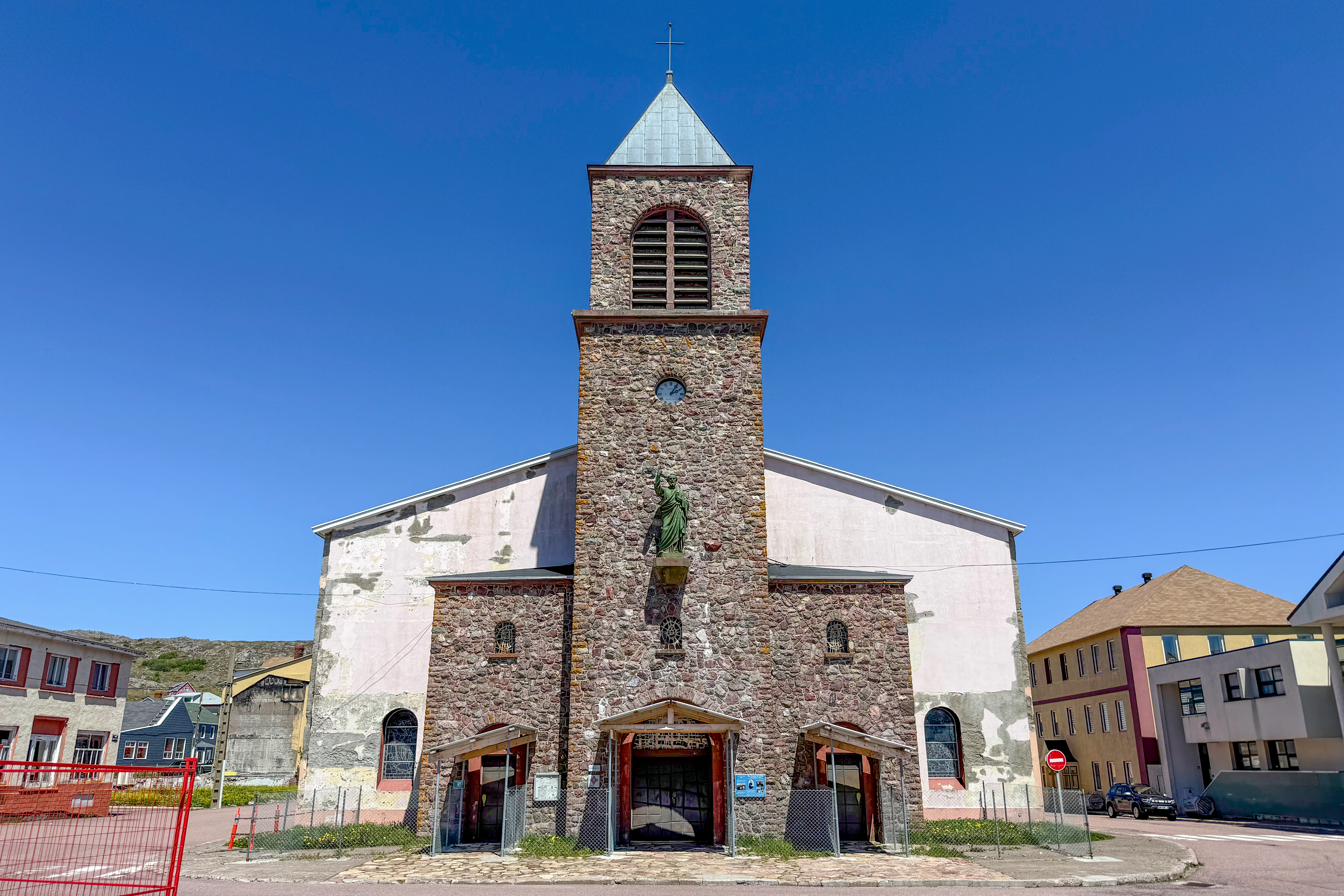
St. Pierre Cathedral

The population is overwhelmingly Christian, with the majority being Catholic. The Vicariate Apostolic of Iles Saint-Pierre and Miquelon managed the local church until it was merged into the Diocese of La Rochelle and Saintes in 2018.

=== Education ===
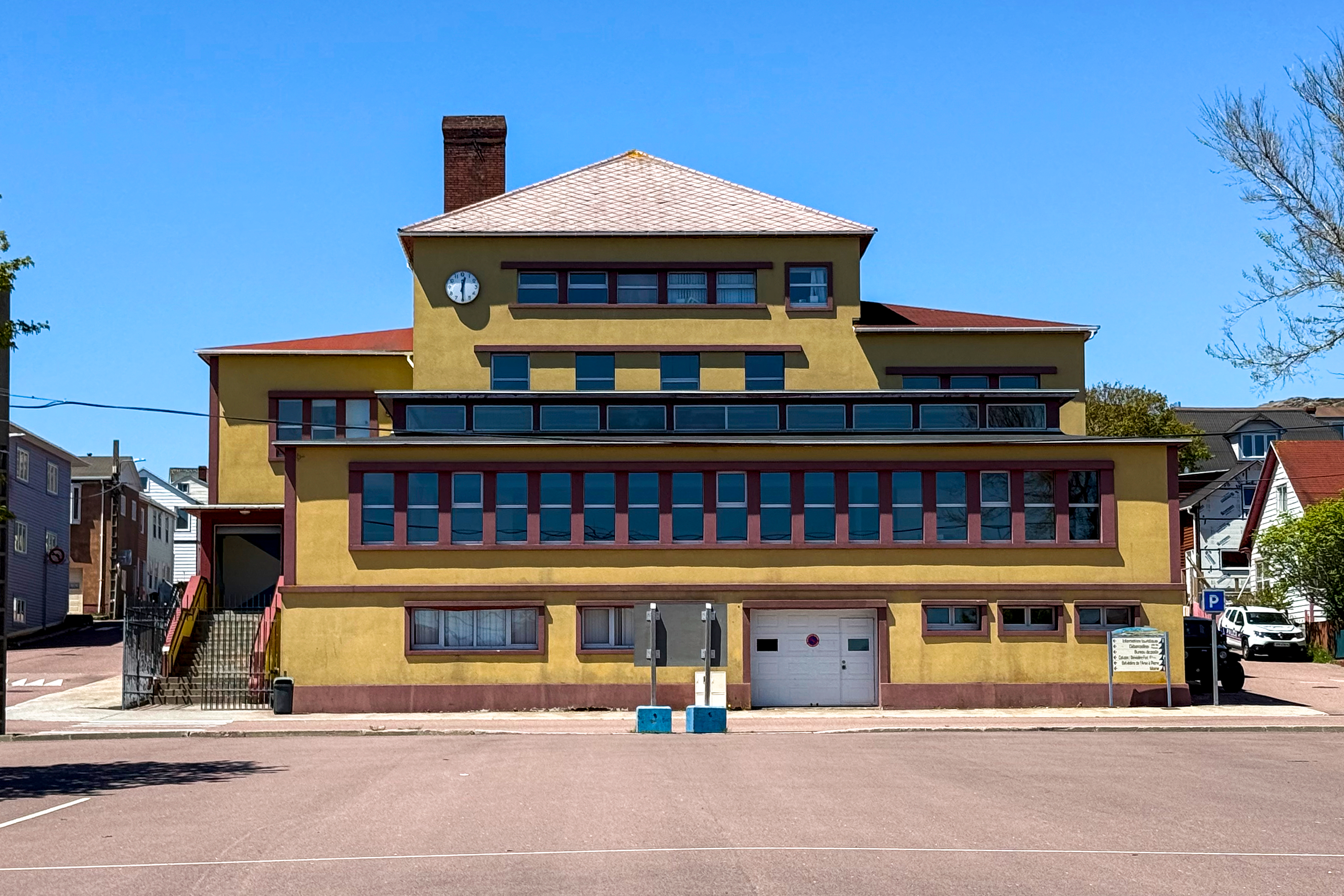
Collège Saint-Christophe, Saint-Pierre

The archipelago has four primary schools (Sainte Odile, Henriette Bonin, Feu Rouge, les Quatre-Temps), one middle school (Collège Saint-Christophe) with an annex in Miquelon, one state (government) high school (Lycée-Collège d'État Émile Letournel) and one vocational high school.

Students who wish to further their studies after high school are granted access to scholarships to study overseas. Most students go to metropolitan France; however, some go to Canada, mainly New Brunswick or Quebec.

Saint-Pierre has had a branch of Memorial University of Newfoundland, the Frecker Institute, since 1973. Since 2001, Frecker had been operated by the local government in Saint Pierre and Miquelon, with support of the federal government of Canada and the provincial government of Newfoundland and Labrador. Today, the Frecker Institute has been replaced by the Frecker Program. It is still run by Memorial University. However, it is held within the building of the Institut de langue française Francoforum, which is now the only French-language institute offering university-level teaching on the island.

=== Health ===
Saint-Pierre and Miquelon's health care system is entirely public and free. In 1994, France and Canada signed an agreement allowing the residents of the archipelago to be treated in St. John's. In 2015, St. Pierre and Miquelon indicated that they would start looking for a new healthcare provider as recent rate increases by Eastern Health in Newfoundland were too expensive (increasing to $3.3 million in 2014 from $2.5 million in 2010). Halifax, Nova Scotia and Moncton, New Brunswick were mooted as possible locations. Since 1985, Hôpital François Dunan provides basic care and emergency care for residents of both islands. The island's first hospital was military in 1904 and became a civilian facility in 1905. L'Hôpital-Hospice-Orphelinat opened in 1937. Advance paediatric health needs are serviced through Janeway Children's Health and Rehabilitation Centre in St. John's.

== Culture ==
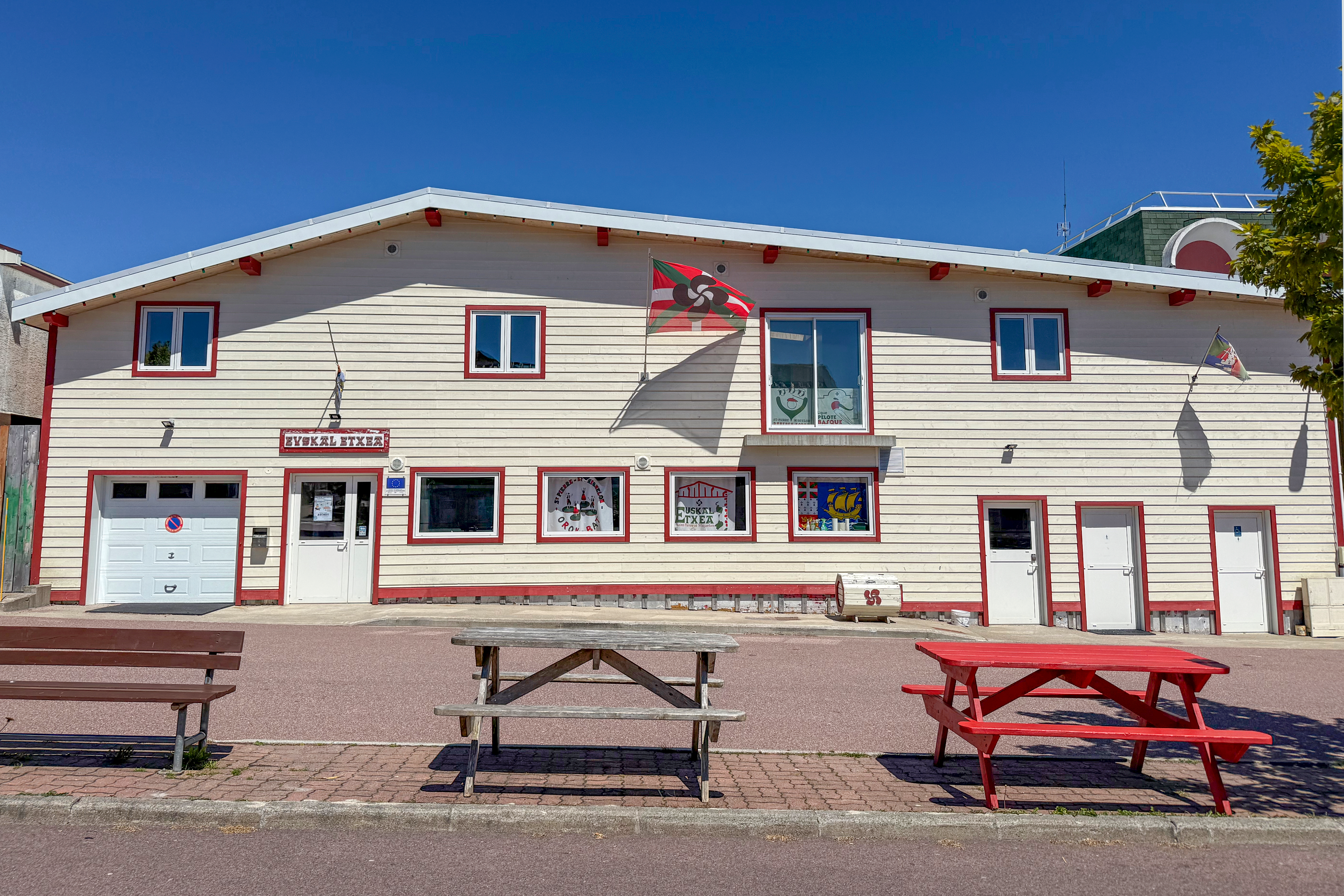
Euskal Etxea Basque cultural centre in Saint Pierre

Every summer there is a Basque Festival, which has demonstrations of harri-jasotzaileak (stone heaving), aizkolaritza (lumberjack skills), and Basque pelota (more widely known in the Americas as frontón/jai alai). The local cuisine is mostly based on seafood such as lobster, snow crab, mussels, and especially cod.

Street names are not commonly used on the islands. Directions and locations are commonly given using nicknames and the names of nearby residents.

The only time the guillotine was used in North America was on Saint-Pierre in the late 19th century. Joseph Néel was convicted of killing Mr. Coupard on Île aux Chiens on 30 December 1888, and subsequently executed by guillotine on 24 August 1889. The device had to be shipped from the French territory of Martinique and it did not arrive in working order. It was very difficult to get anyone to perform the execution; finally a recent immigrant was coaxed into doing the job. This event was the inspiration for the 2000 film The Widow of Saint-Pierre. The guillotine is now in a museum in Saint-Pierre.

=== Sports ===
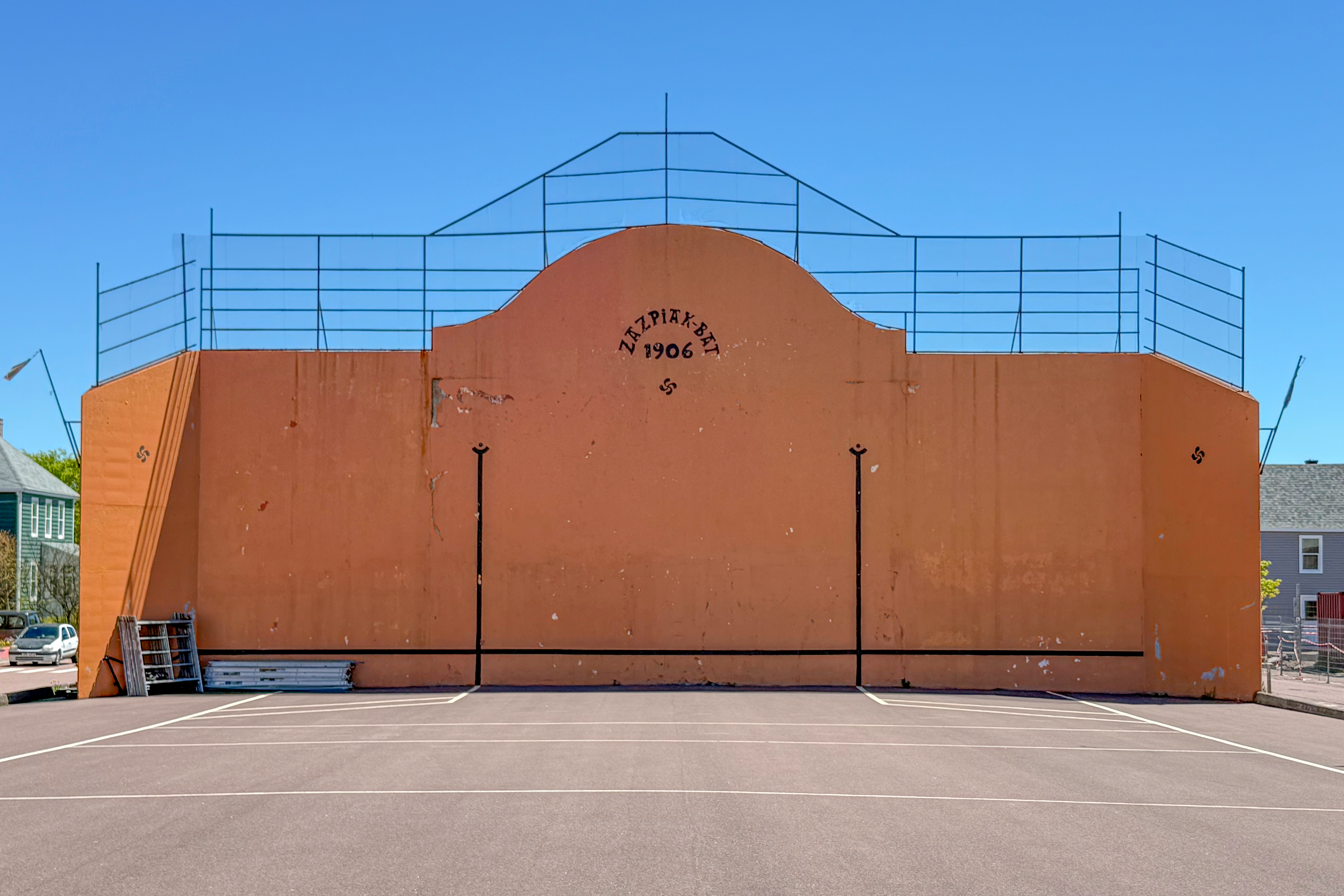
Zazpiak Bat fronton in Saint Pierre

Ice hockey is very popular in Saint-Pierre and Miquelon, with local teams often competing in Newfoundland-based leagues. Several players from the islands have played on French and Canadian club teams, and participated on the France men's national ice hockey team. In 2008, Saint-Pierre and Miquelon played an exhibition match against the French national team and lost 8-6. The territory has not fielded a national side since then.

Saint Pierre and Miquelon has a domestic football league comprising three teams. Starting in 2018, local clubs have competed in France's domestic knockout cup, the Coupe de France. The territory also has a national team, but it is presently not a member of FIFA or CONCACAF.

== Notable people ==
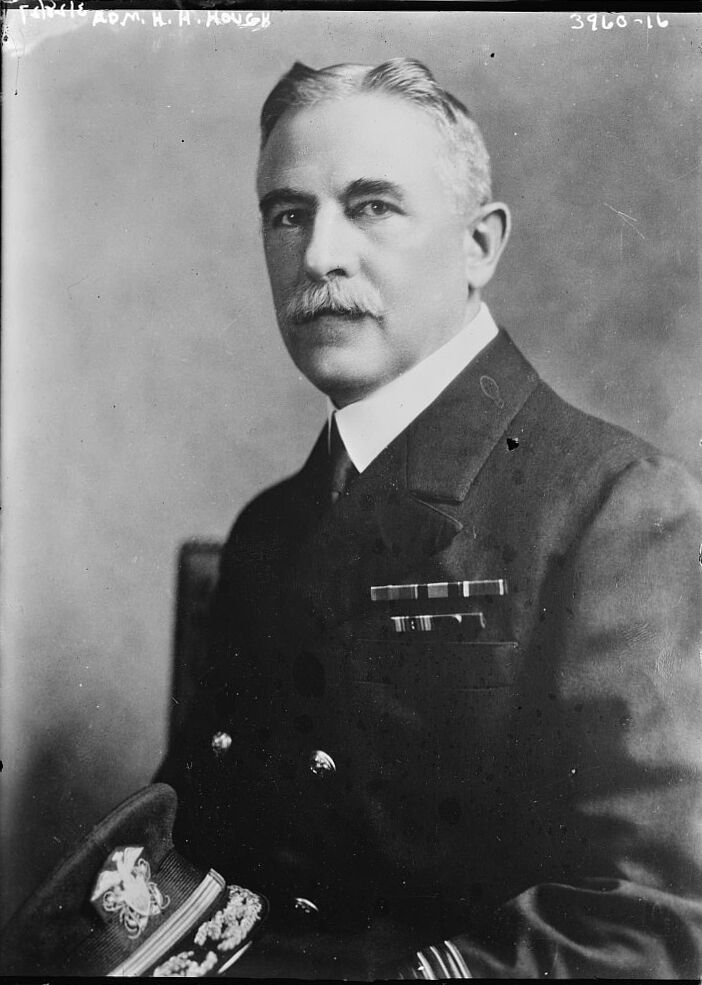
Henry Hughes Hough, 1916

- Henry Hughes Hough (1871–1943), rear admiral of the United States Navy and one-time military Governor of the United States Virgin Islands
- George Alain Frecker (1905–1979), politician and academic administrator
- Paula Nenette Pepin (1908–1990), composer, pianist and lyricist
- Henri Claireaux (1911-2001), politician
- Victor Reux (1929–2016), a politician and teacher
- Eugène Nicole (born 1942), writer and academic; specialist in Marcel Proust
- Catherine Hélène, politician
- Catherine Pen (born 1954), politician
- Françoise Enguehard (born 1957), author who now resides in Canada
- Stéphane Lenormand (born 1964), politician
- Alexandra Hernandez (born 1981), singer-songwriter and poet
- Julien Kang (born 1982), lived there until he was five, a television actor and model in Korea

=== Sport ===
- Patrick Foliot (born 1954), former ice hockey goaltender
- Denis Kang (born 1977), retired mixed martial artist
- Nicolas Arrossamena (born 1990), ice hockey forward
- Valentin Claireaux (born 1991), ice hockey player

== See also ==
- Index of Saint Pierre and Miquelon–related articles
- Outline of Saint Pierre and Miquelon
- Economy of France

- List of French regions and overseas collectivities by GDP
