= Postage stamps and postal history of Saint Pierre and Miquelon =

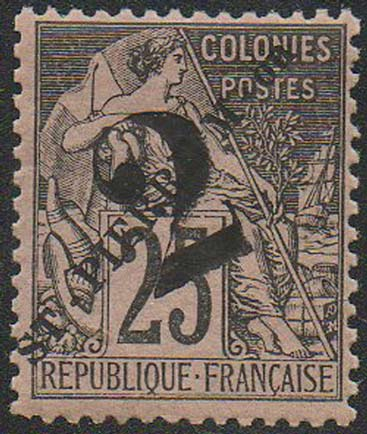
25 Centimes stamp, general issue for the French colonies, 1892 overprinted ST PIERRE M-on and 2

A survey of the postage stamps and postal history of St. Pierre and Miquelon concerns Saint Pierre and Miquelon, a group of French islands off the coast of Newfoundland that have issued stamps since 1885.

== 19th century ==
A handstamp is known used from the head post office in Saint-Pierre in 1853. The general colonial issues of France were used from 1859. In 1885 St. Pierre and Miquelon began overprinting stamps of the French Colonies initially with S P M and with ST PIERRE M-on from 1891 to 1892.

== 20th century ==
From 1909 it issued its own stamps with the islands' name printed in French, either St. Pierre & Miquelon or Saint Pierre et Miquelon. On July 1, 1976, the islands became an official overseas department of France and the islands used the stamps of France from April 1, 1978, until February 3, 1986, when it once again resumed publishing separate issues.
