= List of airports in Saint Pierre and Miquelon =

This is a list of airports in Saint Pierre and Miquelon, sorted by location.

Saint Pierre and Miquelon is an overseas collectivity (French: collectivité d'outre-mer, or COM) of France, consisting of several small islands off the eastern coast of Canada near Newfoundland.

== Airports ==
Location	ICAO	IATA	Airport name	Usage	Coordinates
Miquelon	LFVM	MQC	Miquelon Airport	Public	47°05′45″N 056°23′04″W
Saint-Pierre	LFVP	FSP	Saint-Pierre Airport	Public	46°45′47″N 056°10′27″W

== See also ==
- Transport in Saint Pierre and Miquelon
- List of airports in France
- List of airports by ICAO code: L#Saint Pierre and Miquelon
- Wikipedia: WikiProject Aviation/Airline destination lists: North America#Saint Pierre and Miquelon
