= Saint-Pierre, Saint Pierre and Miquelon =

Capital of Saint Pierre and Miquelon

St. Pierre Saint-Pierre
- Commune and territorial capital
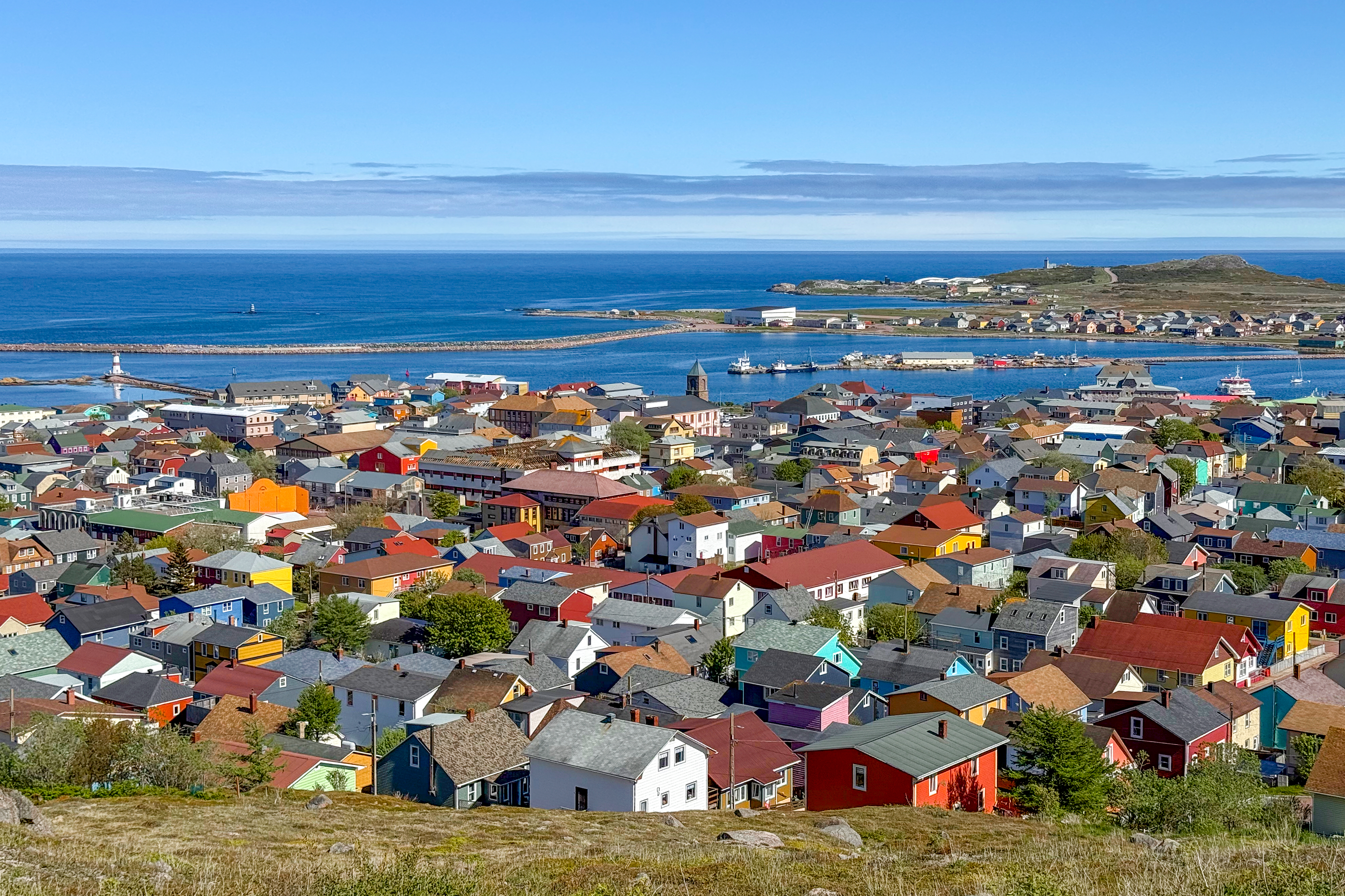
- View of Saint Pierre from the Observatoire de l’Anse à Pierre
- Motto: A mare labor ("The work [comes] from the sea")
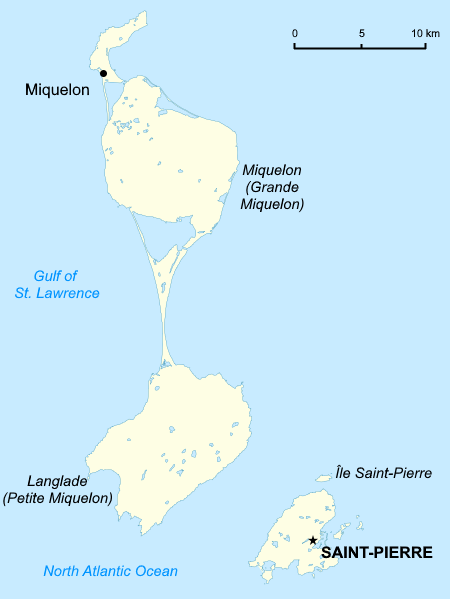

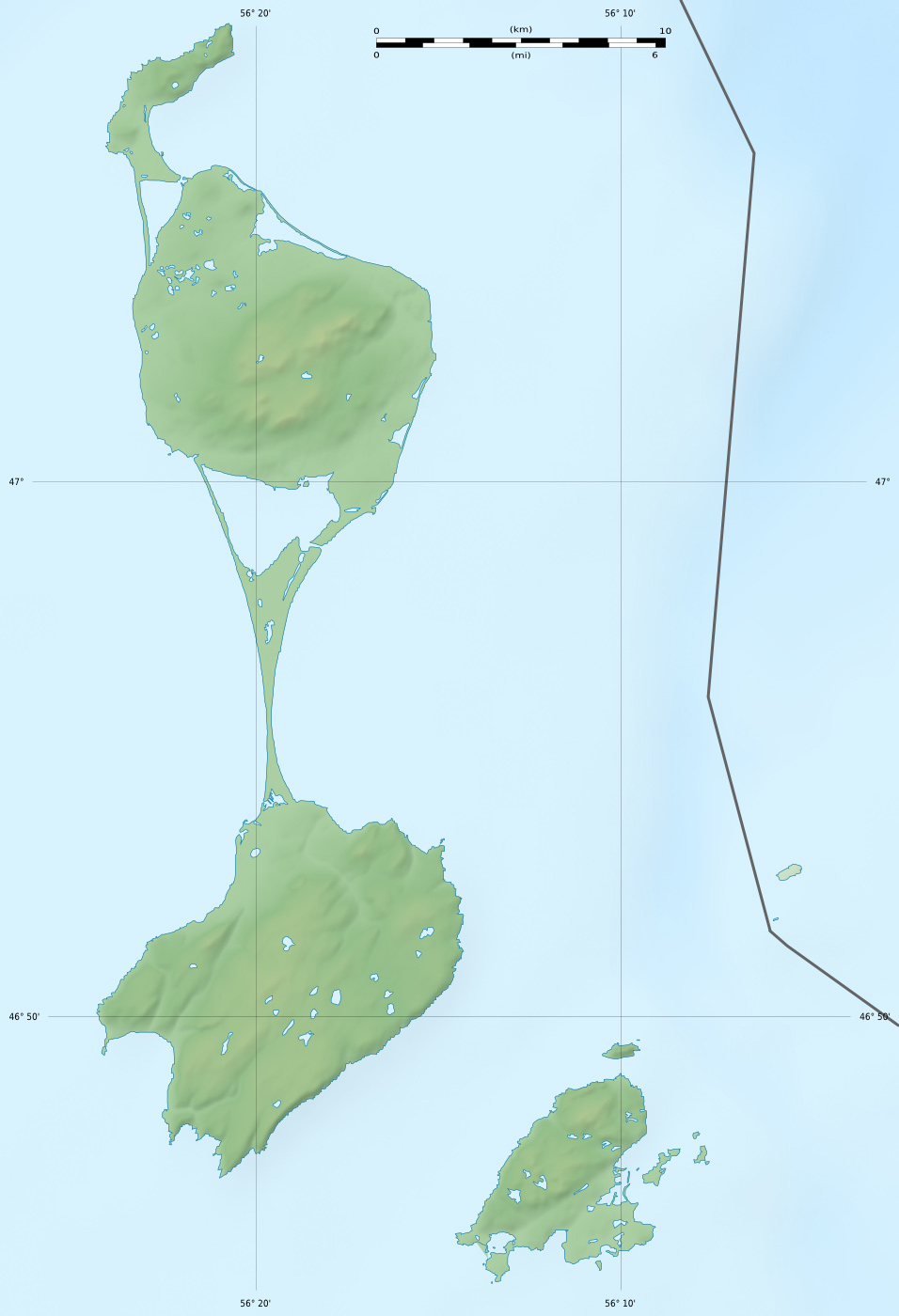
- Location in Saint Pierre and Miquelon Location in North America
- Coordinates: 46°46′54″N 56°10′25″W
- Sovereign State: France
- Overseas collectivity: Saint Pierre and Miquelon
- Historic countries: Kingdom of France (New France); Kingdom of Great Britain (British America)
- First occupation (seasonal): c. 1500s, by European fishermen
- First settled: 1670
- Founded: 1713
- Constituted: 13 May 1872

Government
  - Type: Saint-Pierre Municipal Council
  - Mayor: Yannick Cambray

Area
  - Total: 25 km^{2} (9.7 sq mi)
- Elevation: 207 m (679 ft)
- Lowest elevation: 0 m (0 ft)

Population (2022)
  - Total: 5,223
- Demonym: Saint-Pierrais
- Time zone: UTC−03:00 (PM)
  - Summer (DST): UTC−02:00 (DST)
- Postal code: 97500
- INSEE: 97502
- Website: mairie-stpierre.fr

Saint-Pierre (French pronunciation: [sɛ̃ pjɛʁ]) is the capital of the French collectivité d'outre-mer (territory) of Saint Pierre and Miquelon, off the coast of the Canadian island of Newfoundland. Saint-Pierre is the more populous of the two communes (municipalities) making up Saint Pierre and Miquelon.

== Etymology ==
The commune is named after Saint Peter, who is one of the patron saints of fishermen.

== Geography ==
The commune of Saint-Pierre is made up of the island of Saint Pierre proper and several nearby smaller islands, such as Île-aux-Marins. Although containing nearly 90% of the inhabitants of Saint Pierre and Miquelon, the commune of Saint-Pierre is considerably smaller in terms of area than the commune of Miquelon-Langlade, which lies to its northwest on Miquelon Island.

The main settlement and communal seat is situated on the north side of a harbour called Barachois, which faces the Atlantic Ocean, on the Saint-Pierre Island's east coast. The mouth of the harbour is guarded by a small chain of islands.

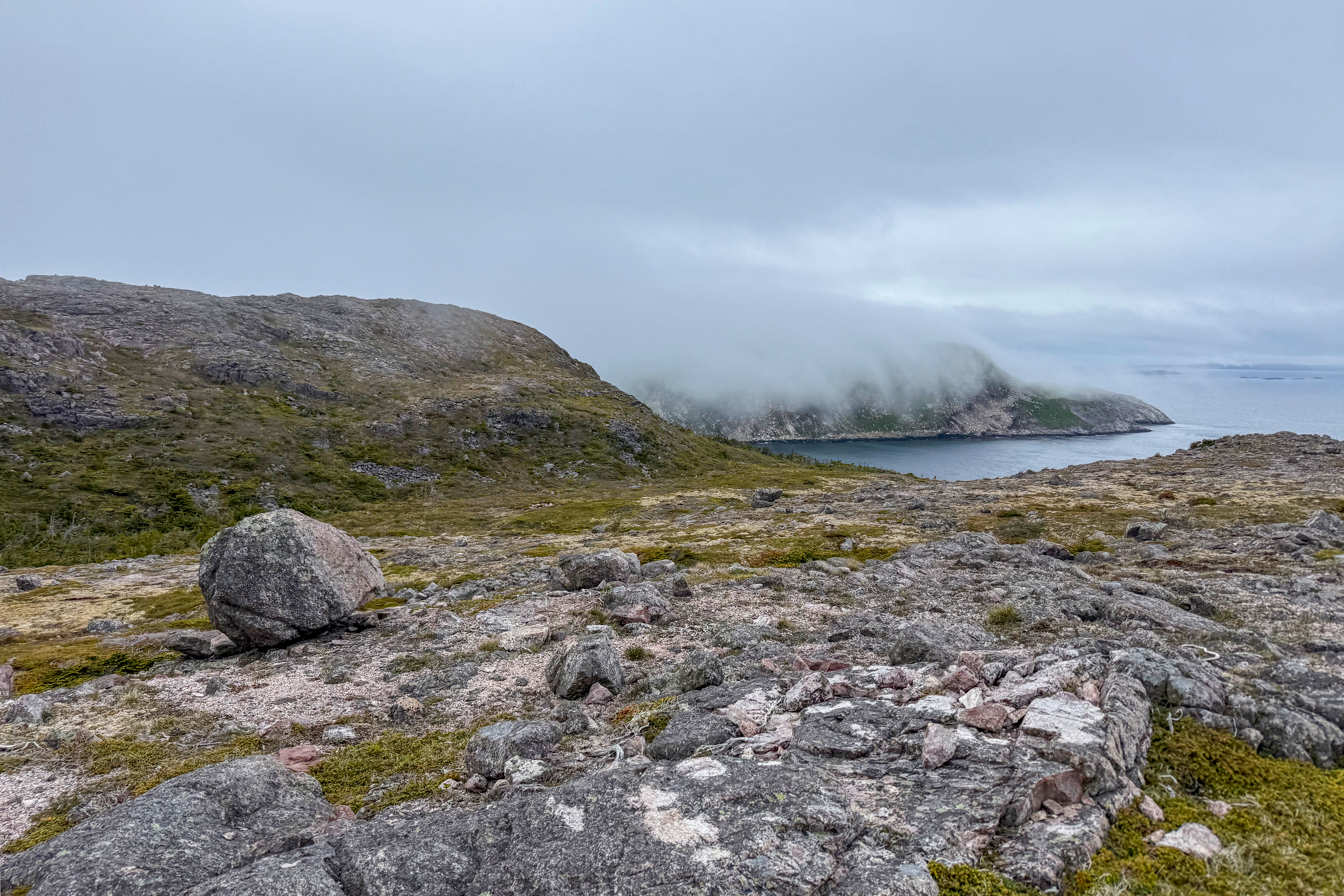
Rocky terrain outside Saint Pierre village, with Grand Colombier Island visible through offshore fog

== Climate ==
The city of St. Pierre experiences a subarctic climate (Köppen Dfc) featuring long cold winters and short warm summers despite being only located close to the 47th parallel north.

Paris is located further north at close to the 49th parallel north but located across the Atlantic experiences much milder temperatures.

== History ==
Jacques Cartier claimed the islands for France in 1536, after they were discovered by the Portuguese in 1520. A report written in 1670 by the first intendant of New France, Jean Talon, which mentions the presence of thirteen fishermen and four sedentary inhabitants.

At the end of the Seven Years' War in 1763, the islands were turned over to Britain; it was given back to France in 1816.

Saint-Pierre was an outpost used to transport alcohol from Canada to the United States during Prohibition.

Until 1945, there existed a third commune in Saint Pierre and Miquelon: Île-aux-Marins. The commune of Île-aux-Marins was annexed by the commune of Saint-Pierre in 1945.

== Demographics ==
The population of Saint-Pierre in 2022 was 5,223; many of them are of Basque, Breton, Norman or Acadian descent. All inhabitants in the commune live on the island of Saint-Pierre proper.

== Government ==
The commune is led by a mayor and a council. The current mayor, elected in 2020, is Yannick Cambray.

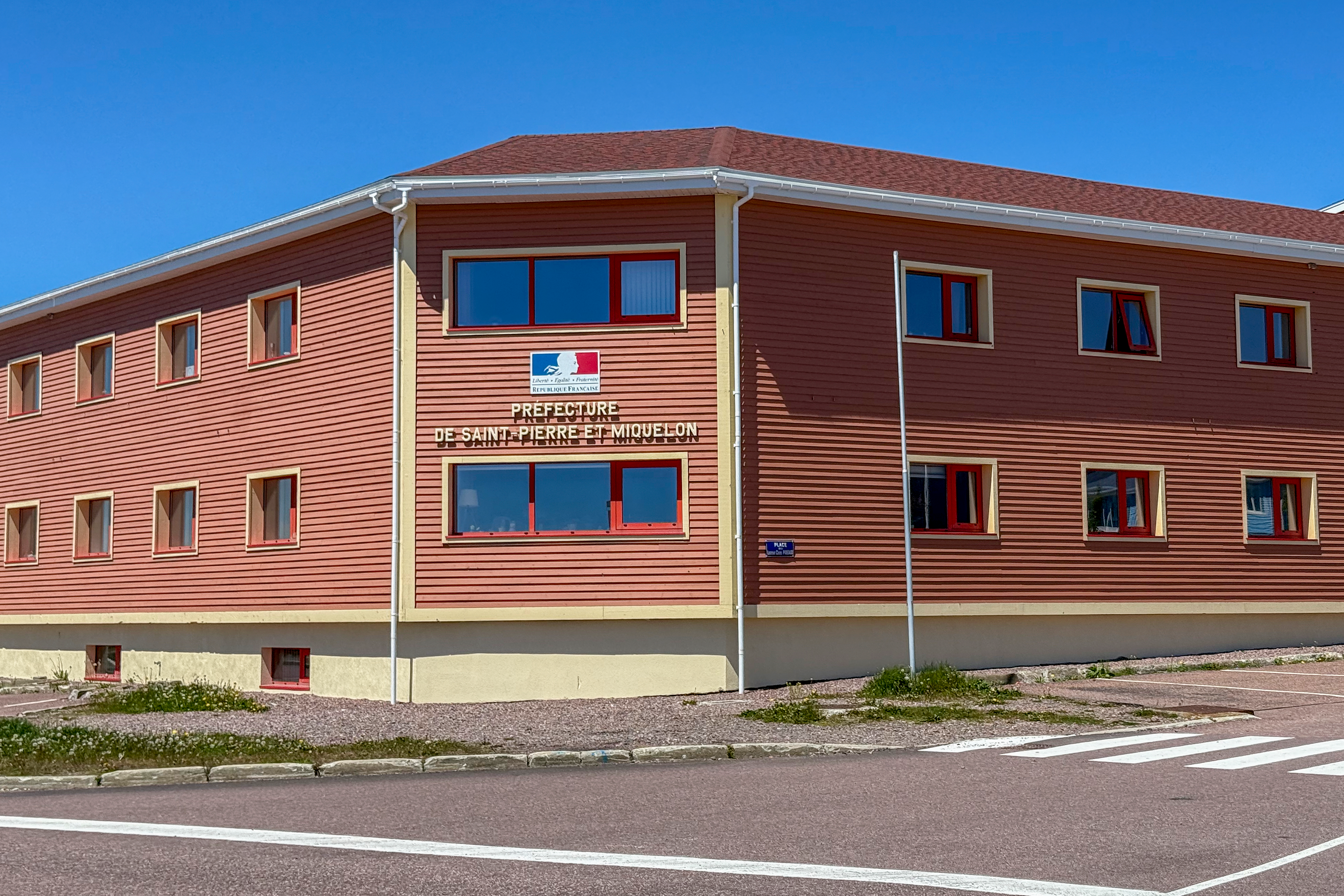
The Prefecture of Saint Pierre and Miquelon

== Landmarks ==
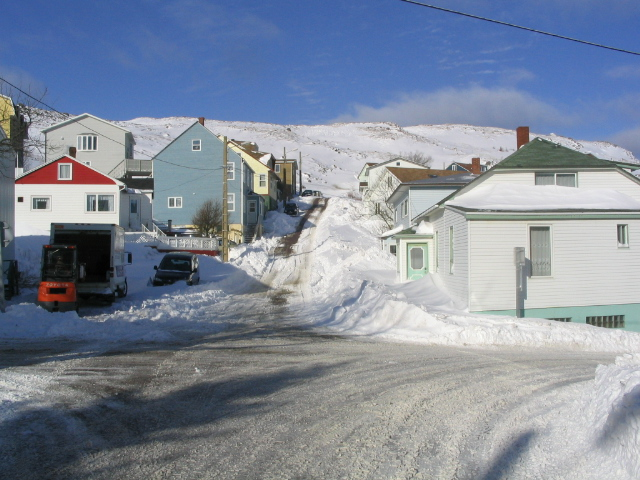
Saint-Pierre under snow.

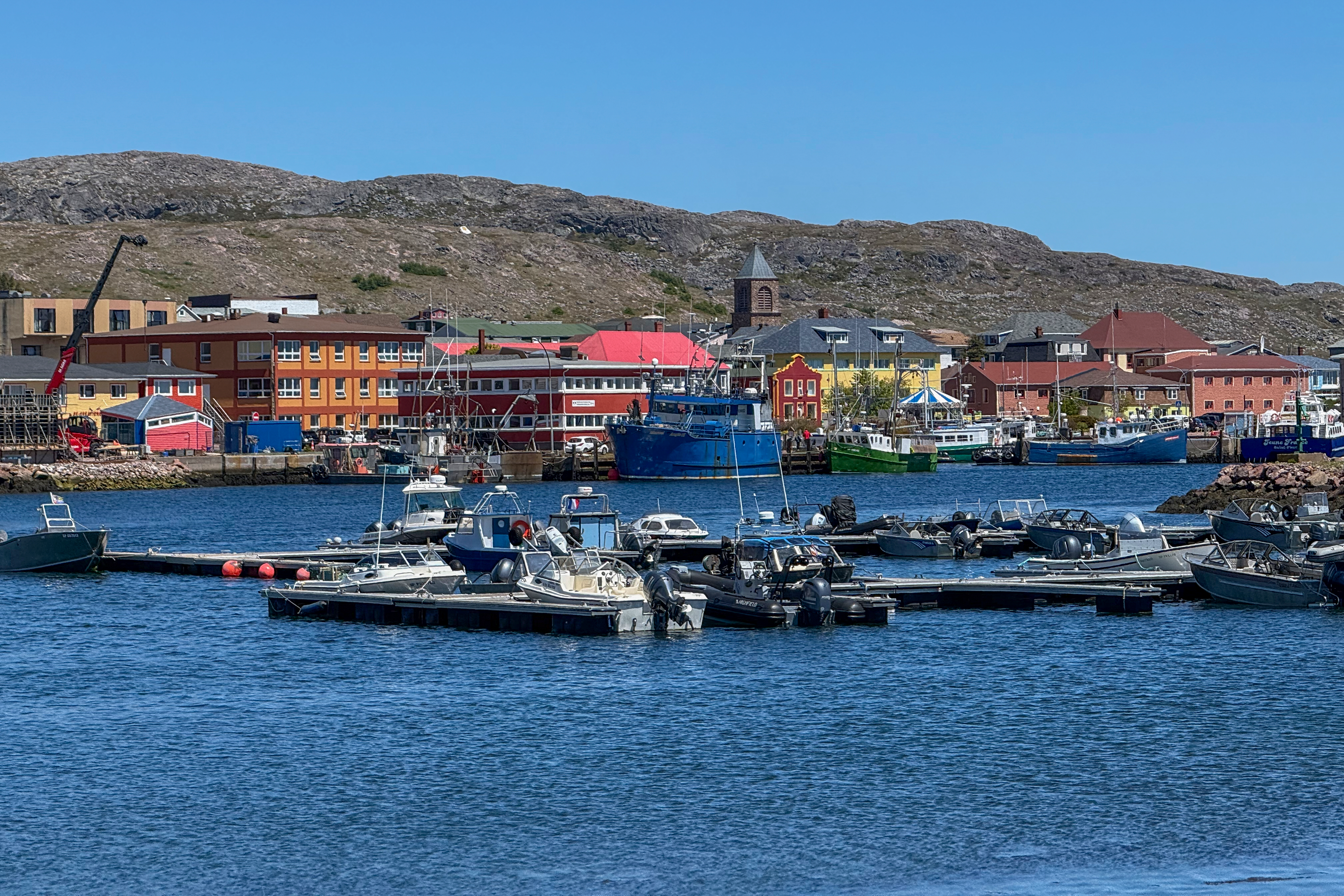
Saint Pierre village and harbour beneath the island’s rocky hills

Close to the centre of the harbour's edge lie the Post office and Custom House (staffed by Directorate-General of Customs and Indirect Taxes), behind which is General Charles de Gaulle Square, the town's centre.

Other prominent landmarks include the St. Pierre Cathedral, to the north of the square, rebuilt from 1905 to 1907 after a major fire, and the Pointe aux Canons Lighthouse, at the mouth of the harbour. Further north, close to the town's former hospital, is the Fronton Zazpiak Bat - an arena for the traditional Basque sport of pelota.

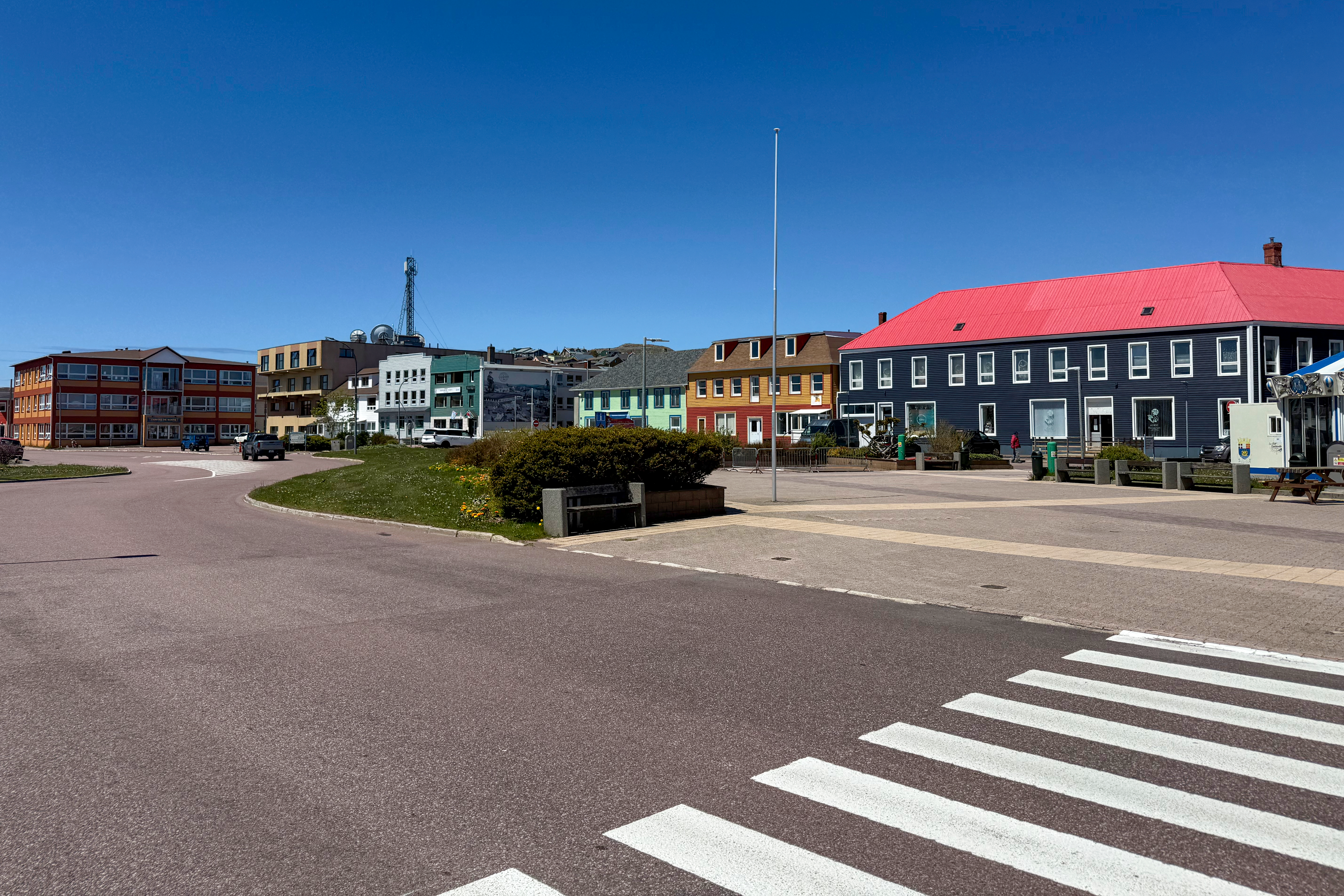
General Charles de Gaulle Square in Saint Pierre

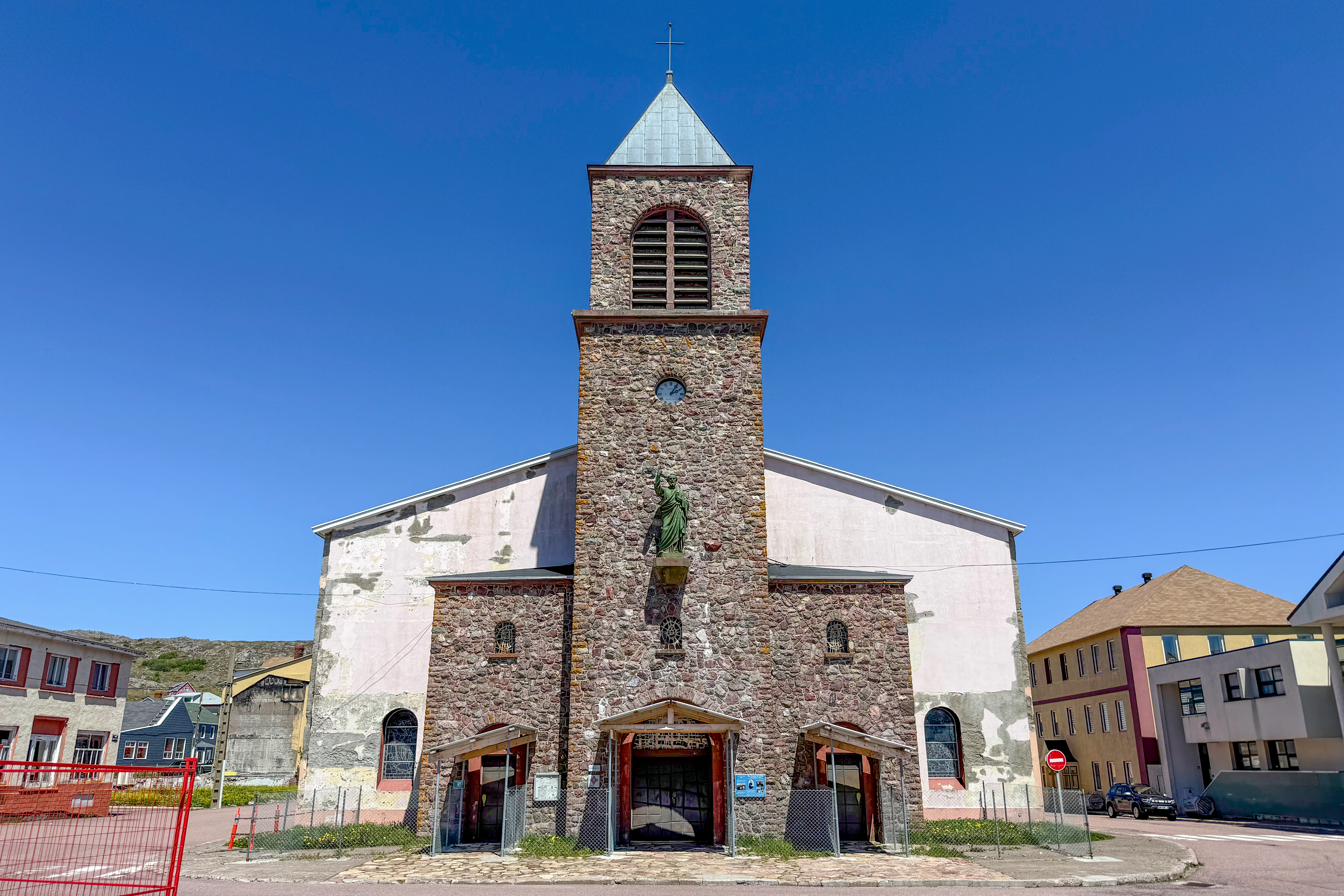
St. Pierre Cathedral

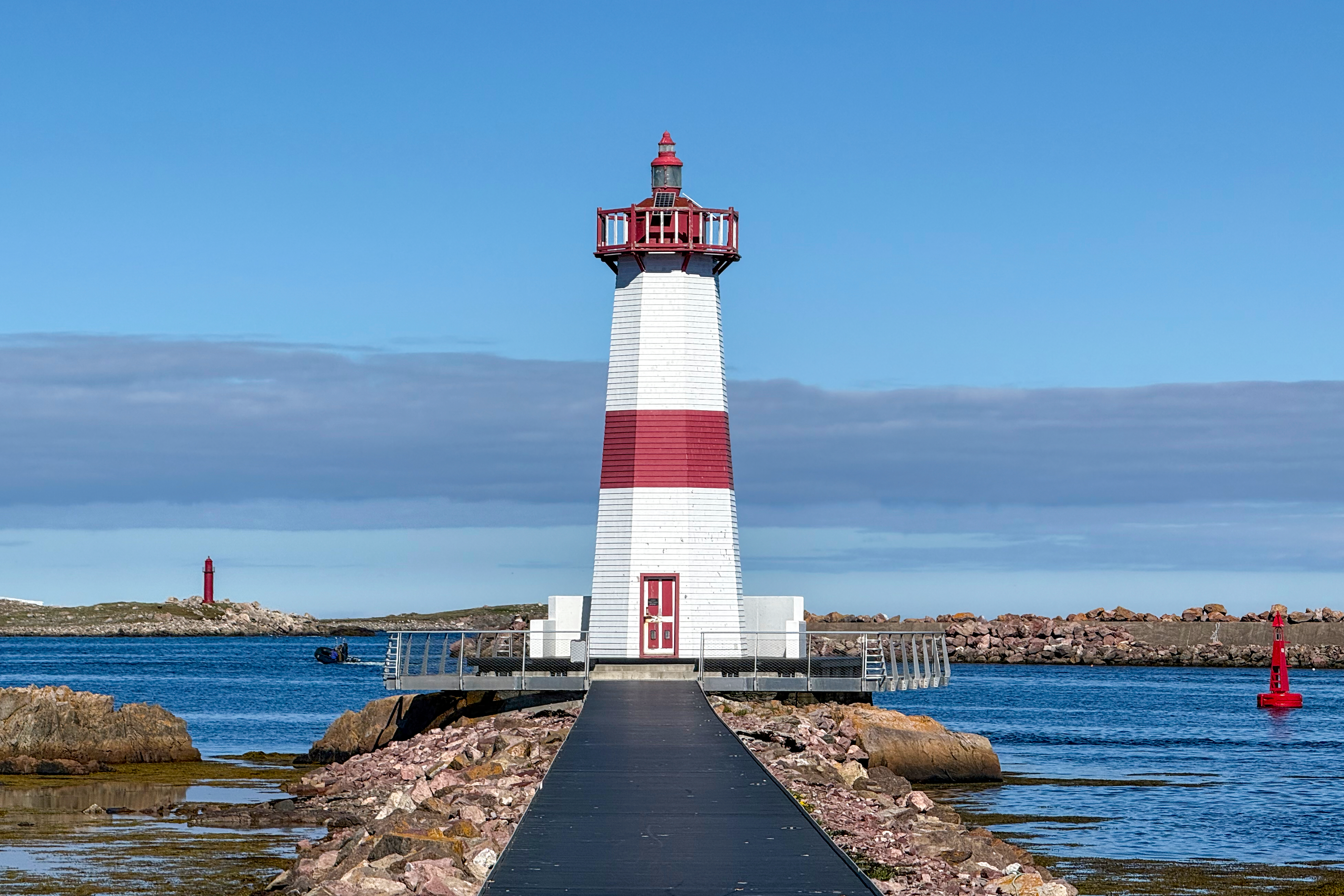
Pointe aux Canons Lighthouse in Saint Pierre

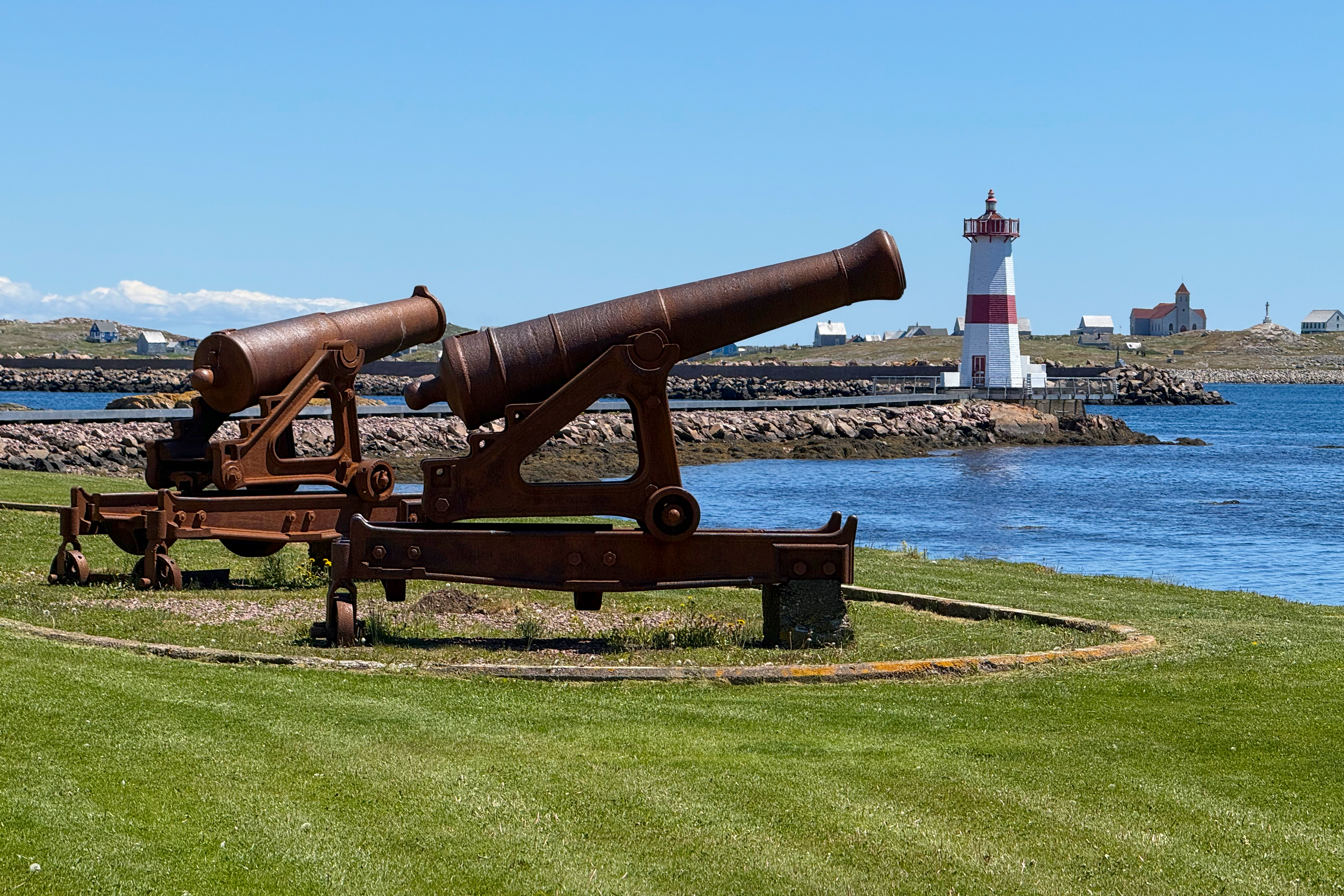
Cannons at Pointe aux Canons in Saint Pierre

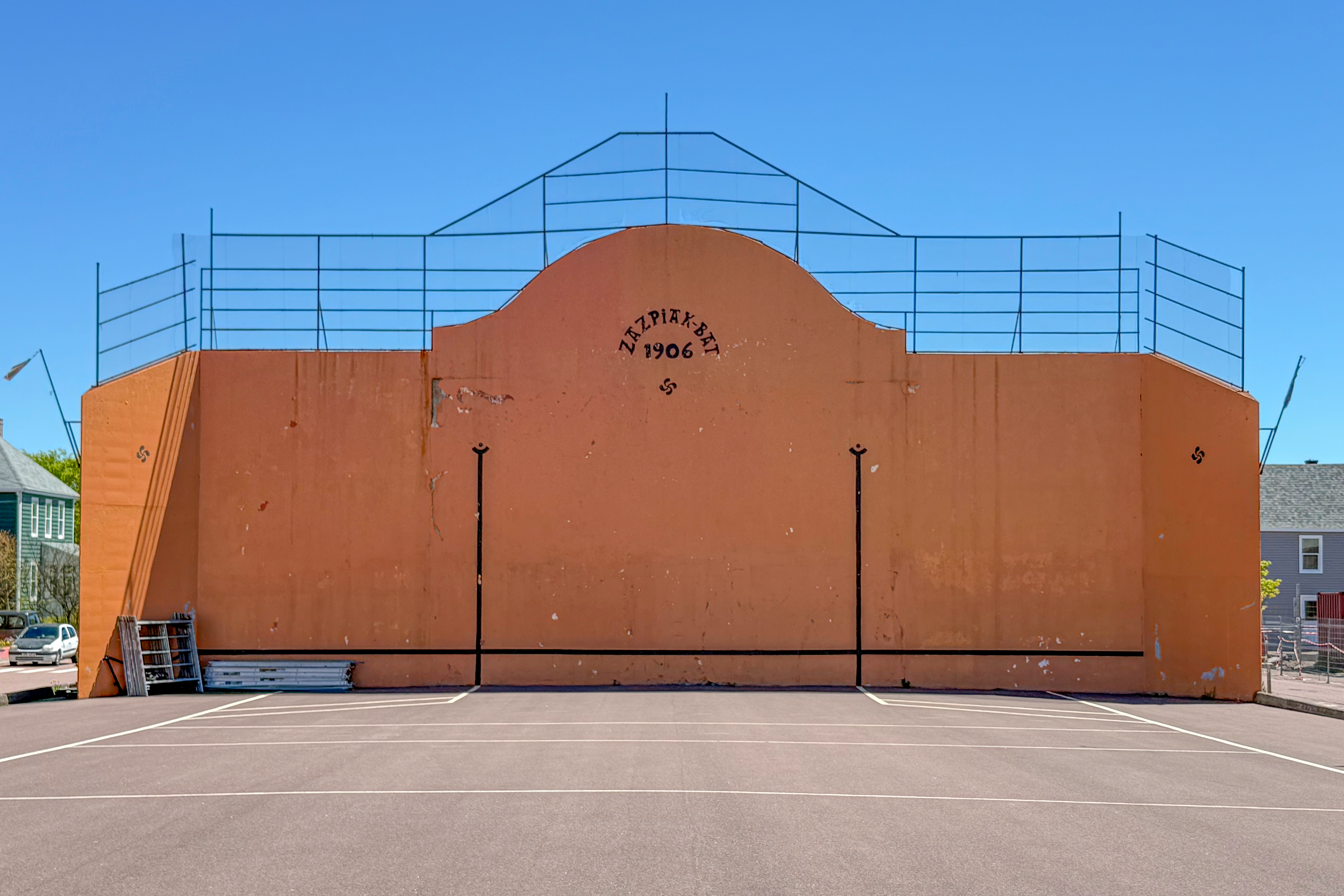
Fronton Zazpiak Bat in Saint Pierre

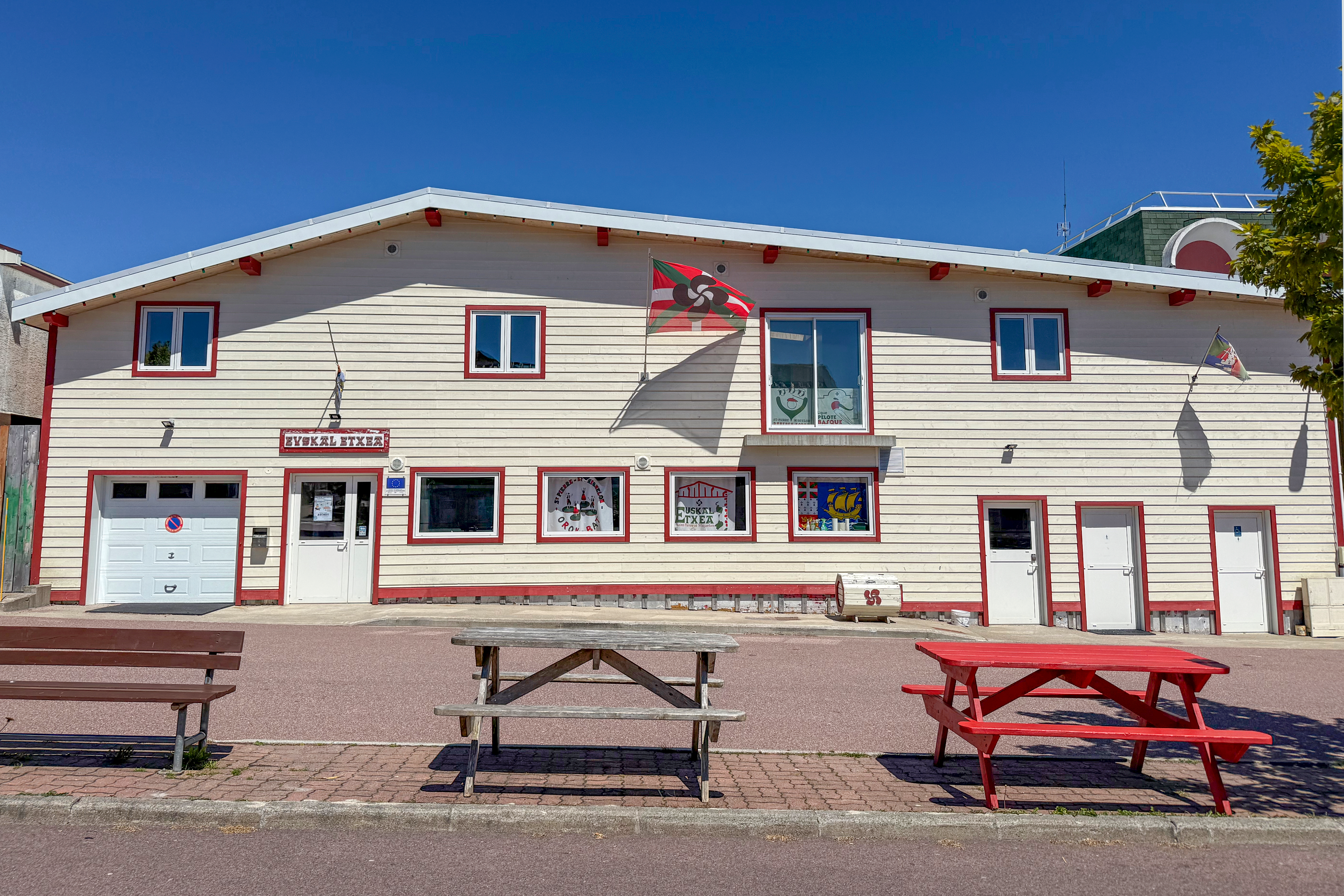
Euskal Etxea Basque cultural centre in Saint Pierre

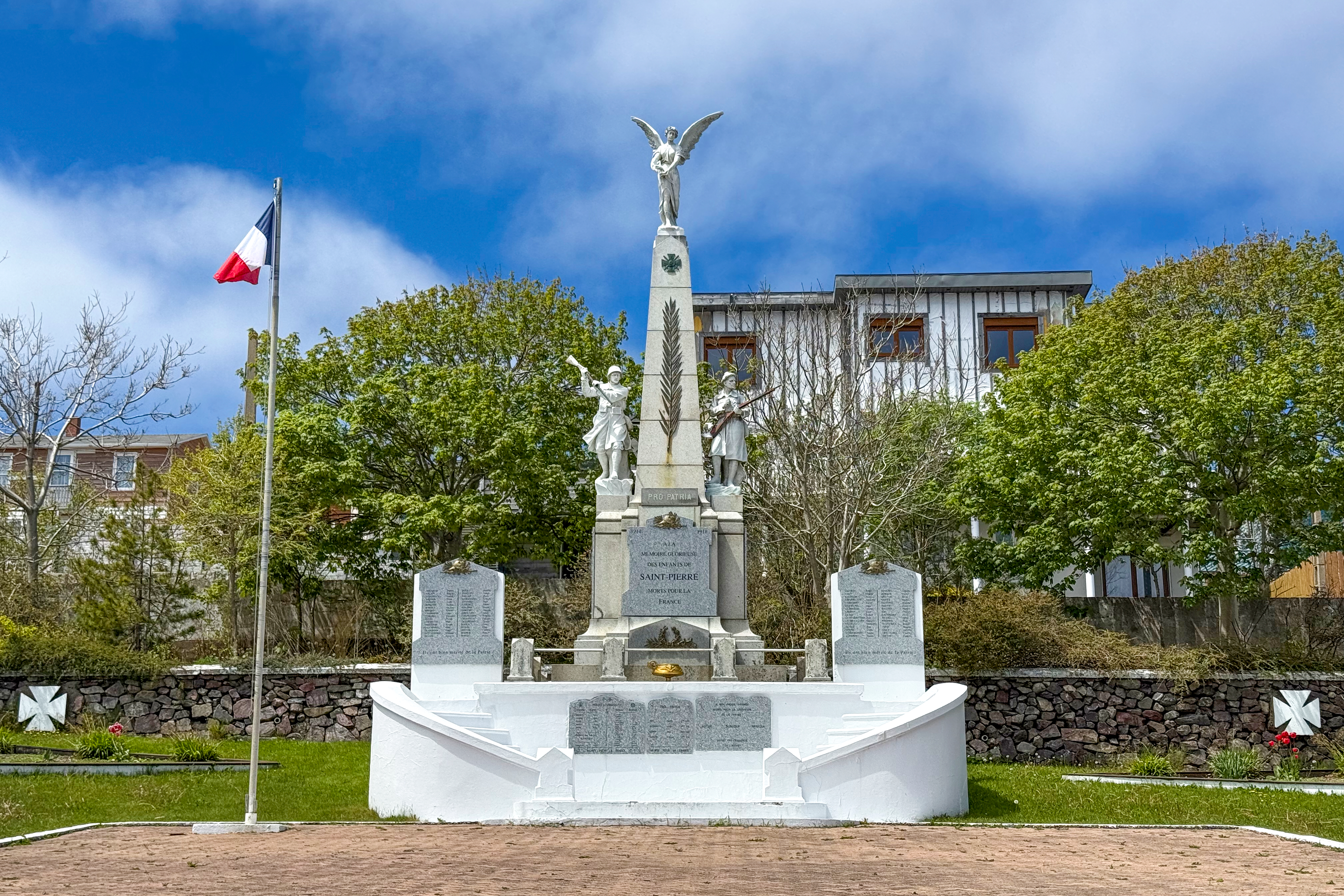
Saint Pierre war memorial

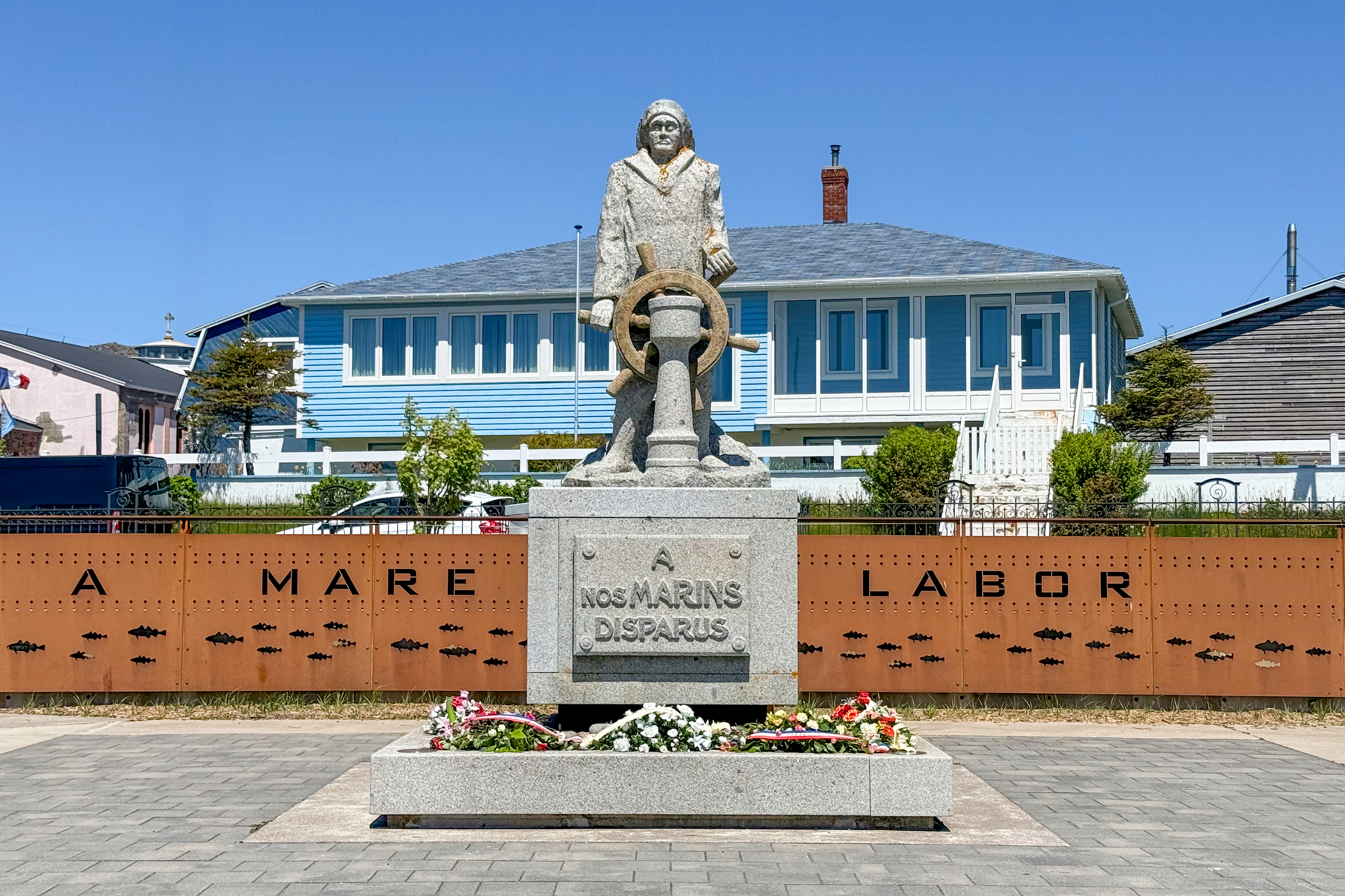
Monument to Saint Pierre’s sailors lost at sea

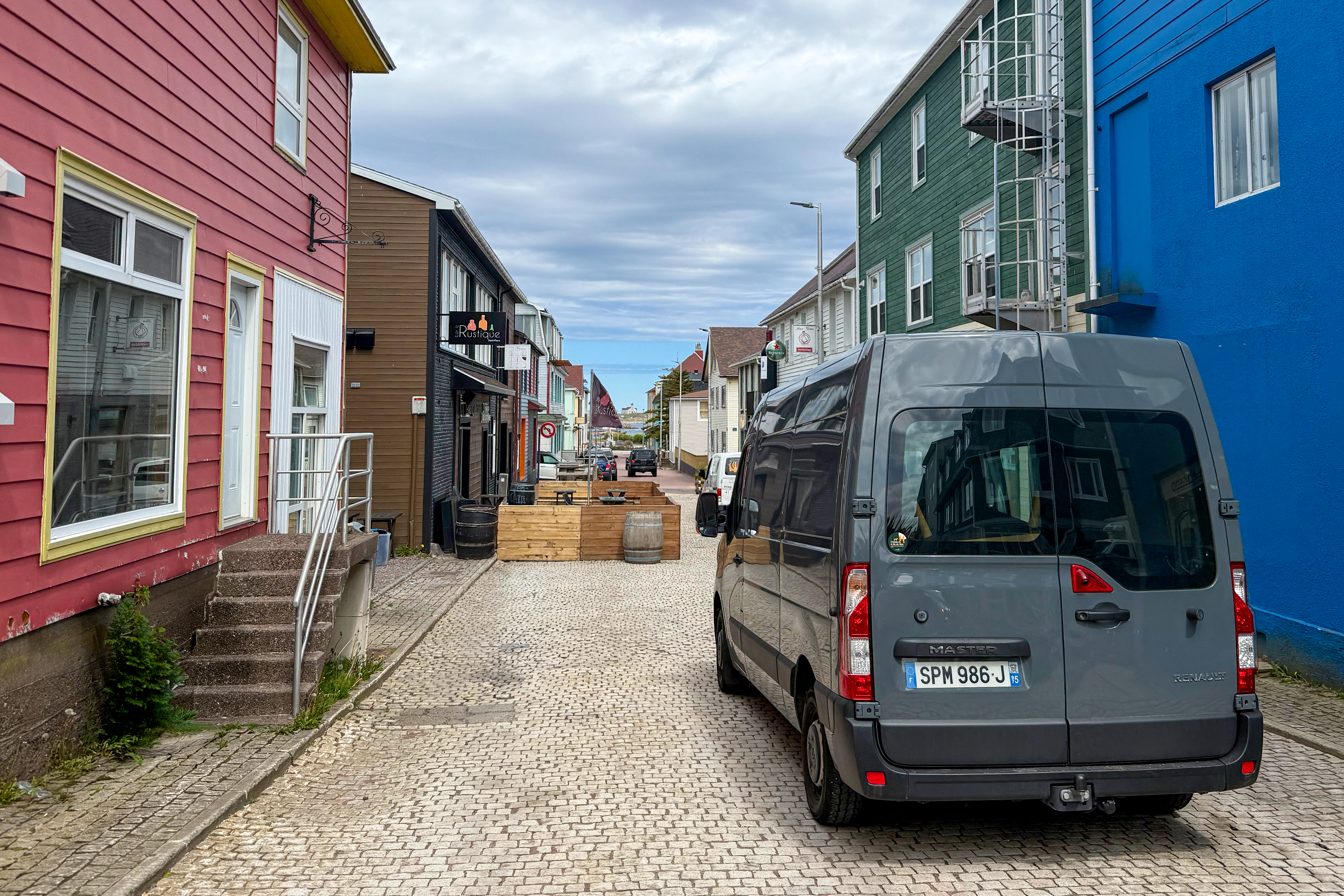
Rue Albert Briand in Saint Pierre

== Services ==
The François Dunan Hospital Centre (opened in 2011) is the only hospital in Saint Pierre and Miquelon. There is an attached senior home offering health services at the Maison de retraite Eglantine.

Additionally, there is a municipal library, opened in the 1970s, and a municipal sailing school, opened in 1986.

== Transportation ==
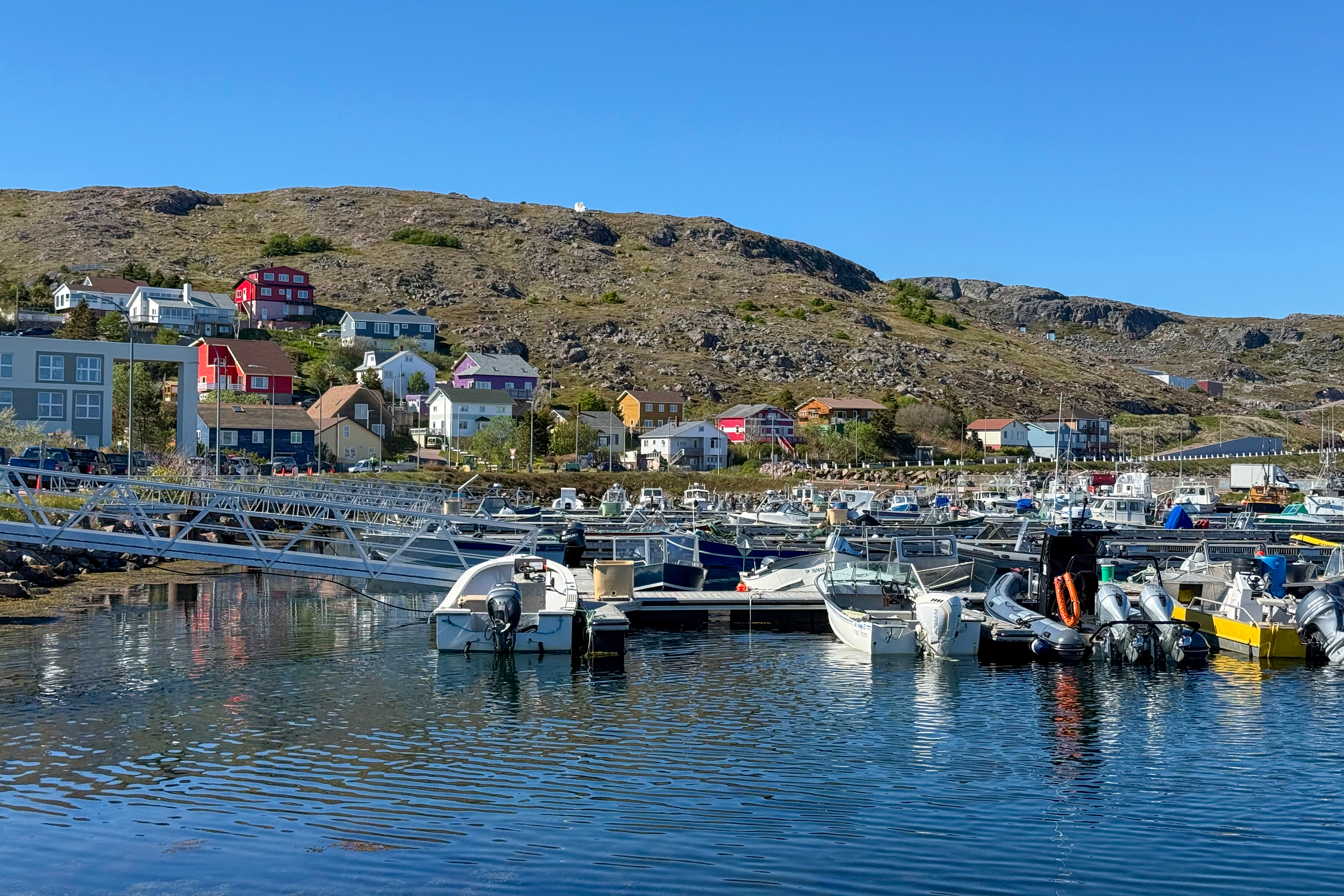
Fishing boats in Saint Pierre Harbour below the northeastern quarter of the village

Saint-Pierre Pointe-Blanche Airport, the international airport of Saint-Pierre and Miquelon, is located south of the settlement of Saint-Pierre and is served by Air Saint-Pierre with flights both to Miquelon Airport, five Canadian airports and seasonal service to Paris.

SPM Ferries provides ferry connections with Fortune, Newfoundland, Canada; the port in Miquelon town; and a quay at La Colo on Langlade. BPE runs a ferry between Saint-Pierre town and Île-aux-Marins.

Transport around the island itself is either by private car, or by taxi, cars with drivers for hire, or car or bike rental. There are no public buses or railways on Saint Pierre.

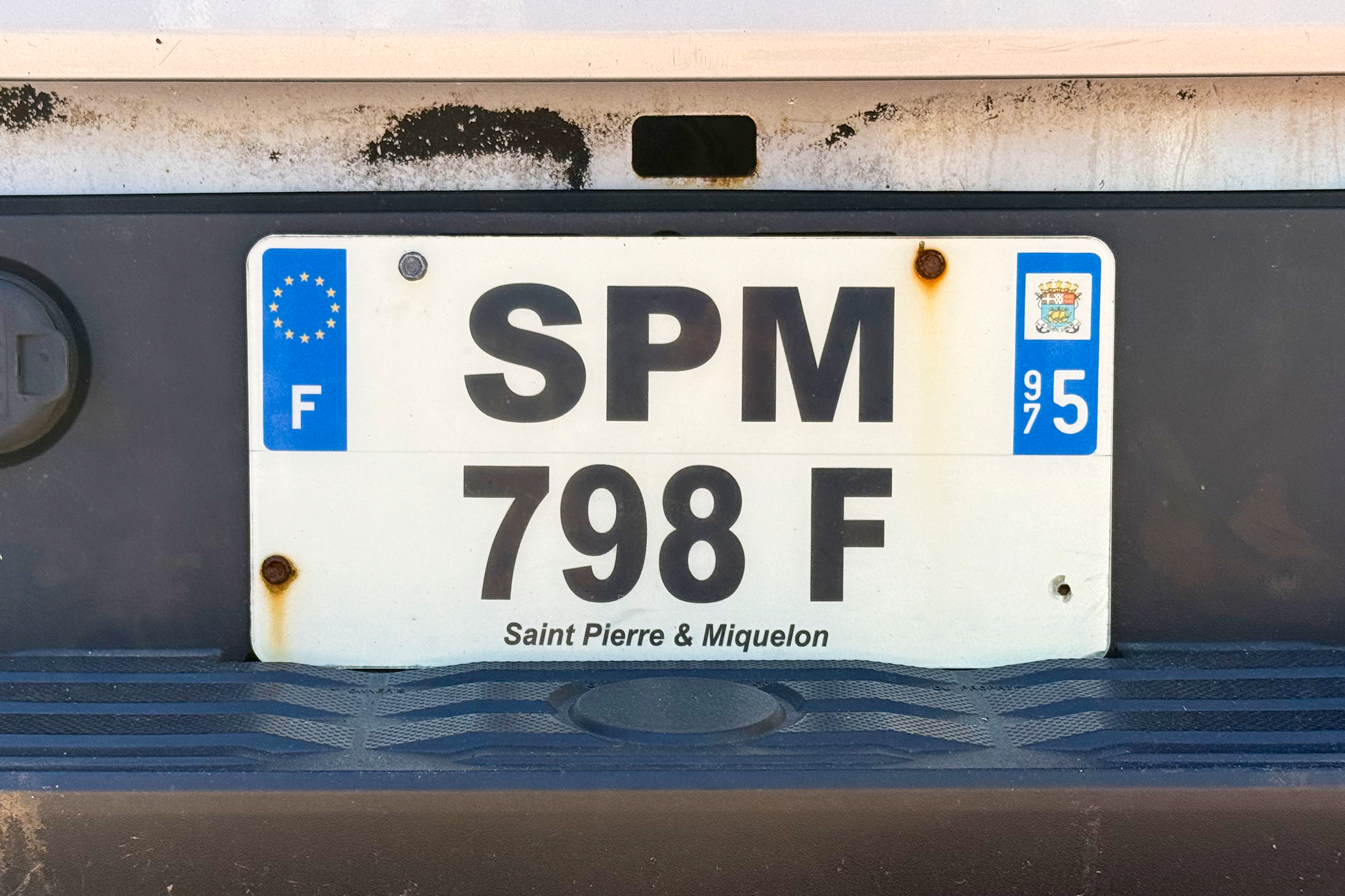
North American-format license plate in Saint Pierre, bearing the territorial code 975

== Radio and television ==
- Saint Pierre and Miquelon La Première (formerly RFO Saint Pierre and Miquelon)
- Radio Atlantique

== Education ==
Public primary schools in the commune:

- École maternelle Île aux Enfants - As of 2025, this Kindergarten school had 60 students.
- École élémentaire du Feu-Rouge - As of 2016 it had 172 students. In 2025, that number has plummeted to 118. It is in the downtown area of the commune and is one nautical cable from the Île aux Enfants nursery.

Lycée-Collège d'État Émile Letournel is the public secondary school in the commune, with junior high, vocational high, and general senior high/sixth-form programmes.

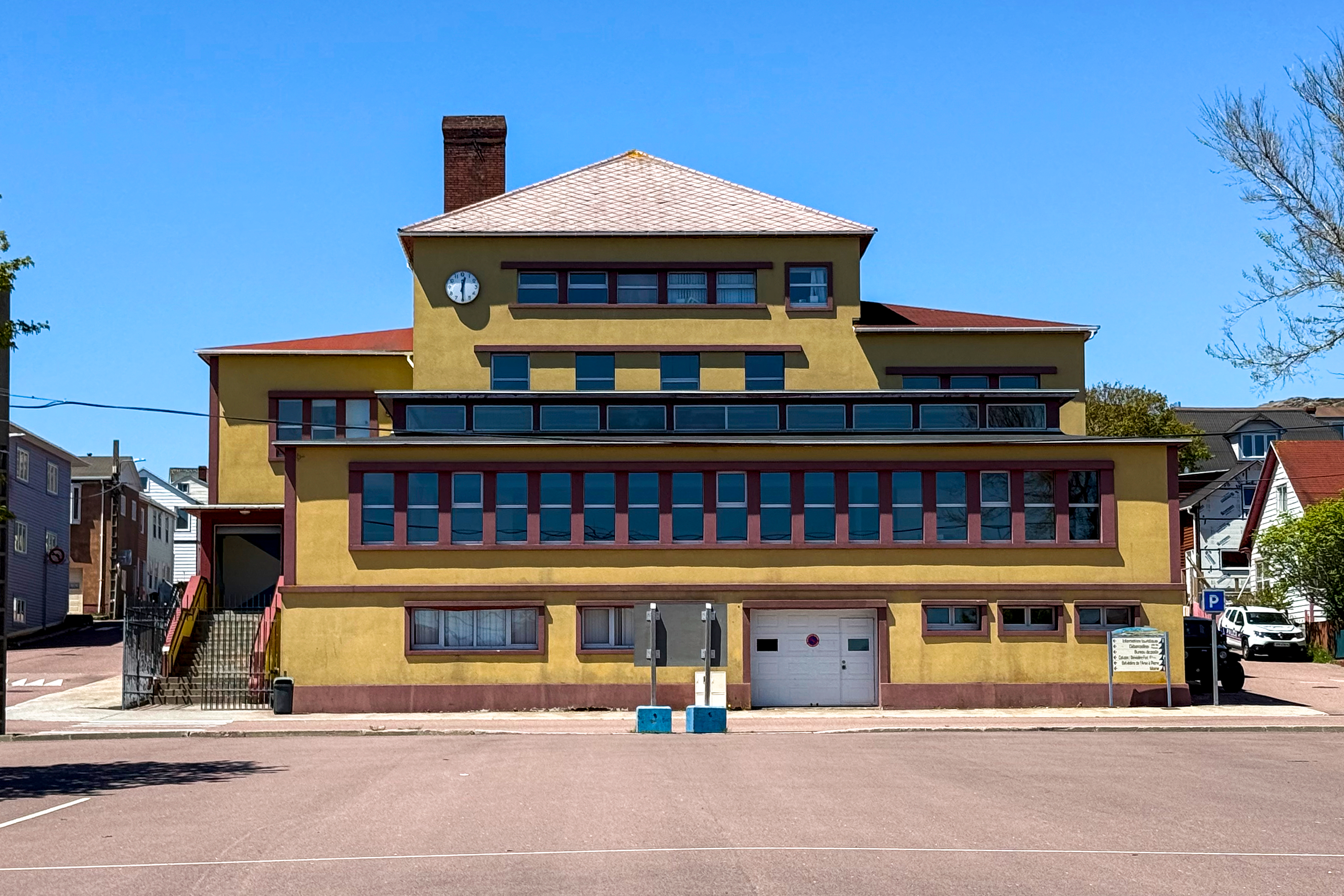
Collège Saint-Christophe in Saint Pierre

Private schools:

- École élémentaire Sainte-Croisine - As of 2025, this school had 129 students.
- École primaire Sainte-Odile - As of 2025, this Kindergarten school had 84 students.
- Collège Saint-Christophe - As of 2025, this school has 147 students.

== Twin towns ==
Saint-Pierre has been twinned with Port-en-Bessin-Huppain (France) since 1976.

== See also ==
- Miquelon-Langlade
