= Air Saint-Pierre =

Airline serving the French overseas collectivity of Saint Pierre and Miquelon

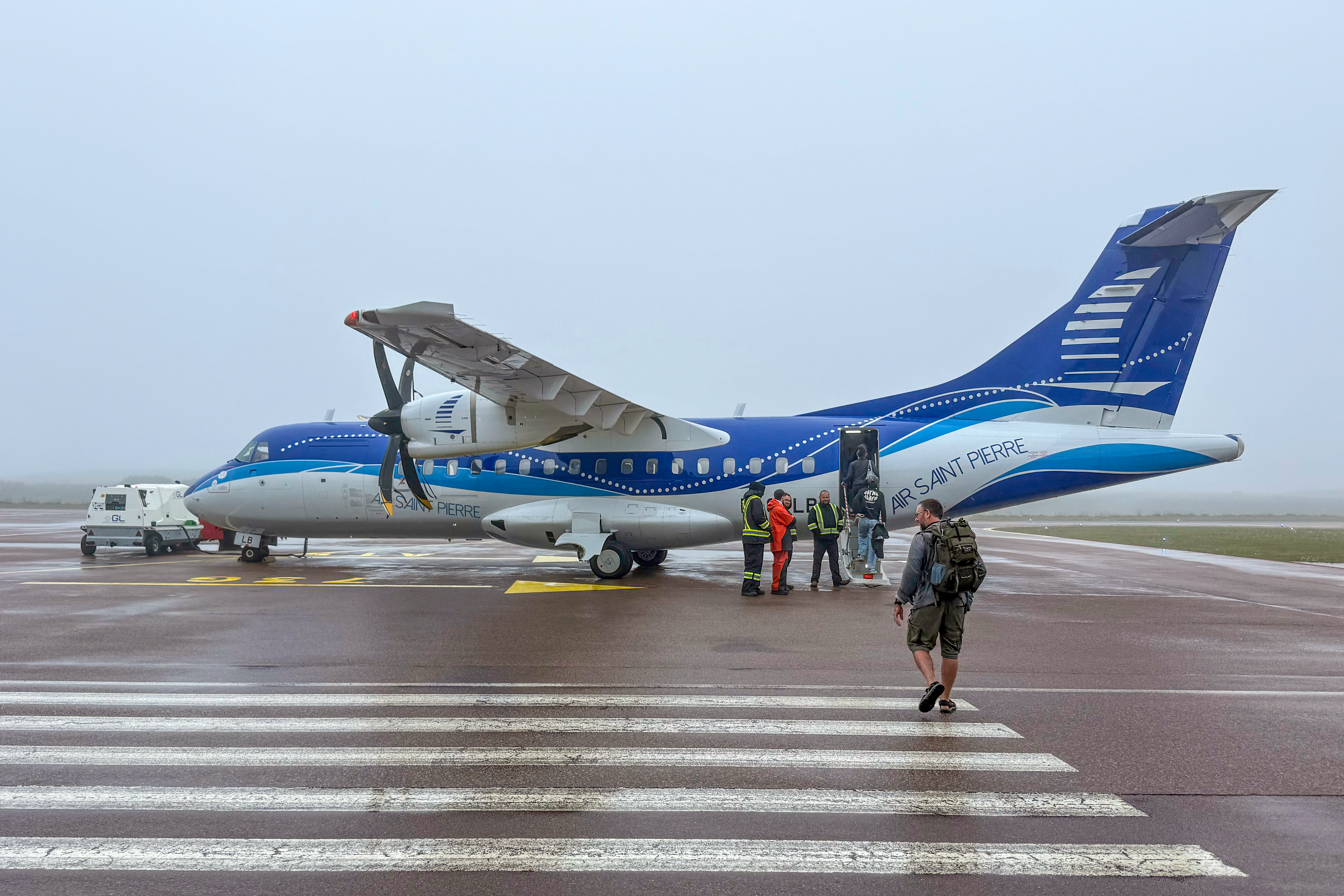
- Air Saint-Pierre's ATR 42-600
IATA	ICAO	Call sign
PJ	SPM	SAINT-PIERRE
- Founded: 1964; 56 years ago
- Commenced operations: 1965; 55 years ago
- Hubs: Saint-Pierre Airport
- Fleet size: 1
- Destinations: 7
- Parent company: Privately owned
- Headquarters: Saint-Pierre, France
- Key people: Benoit Olano, Claudio Detcheverry President
- Website: www.airsaintpierre.com

Air Saint-Pierre is a French airline based in Saint-Pierre, Saint Pierre and Miquelon, a French overseas collectivity. The airline operates scheduled services between the islands of Saint-Pierre and Miquelon-Langlade as well as to Canada. Its main base is Saint-Pierre Airport, from which it serves six destinations. In addition to the collectivity's other airport, Miquelon Airport, it serves five airports in Canada. The airline operates a fleet of an ATR 42 aircraft for international services and a Reims-Cessna F406 on the inter-island service.

The airline was founded in 1964 and originally flew in cooperation with Eastern Provincial Airways. The operator's first aircraft was a Piper Aztec, which was put into service flying to Sydney, Nova Scotia.

During the 1970s, the airline variously took into use Beechcraft Model 18 and Hawker Siddeley HS 748 aircraft. Flights to Miquelon were introduced in 1979 and to Montreal two years later. A Piper Chieftain was bought in that year. ATR 42s were introduced in 1994 and services to Moncton, New Brunswick and St. John's, Newfoundland and Labrador were introduced in the following years.

== History ==
The airline was incorporated on 6 March 1964, founded by Albert Briand. Services commenced in June with a cooperation with Eastern Provincial Airways, allowing codesharing with EPA's Douglas DC-3 between Saint-Pierre and Sydney. However, the codesharing was terminated in October. Air Saint-Pierre thereafter started conducting charter flights with a Piper Aztec. A second unit was procured in 1966, the same year as the founder died. The airline continued its cooperation with EPA, including hiring the latter for maintenance.

The Saint-Pierre to Sydney route resumed under operation of Air Saint-Pierre in 1971. At first they flew using a Beechcraft Model 18, and three years later this was increased to flights using a DC-3. In 1976 the DC-3 was sold and replaced with a Hawker Siddeley HS 748. Miquelon Airport opened in 1979, allowing Air Saint-Pierre to commence an inter-island service to the larger island of Miquelon-Langlade. The same year the pooling between EPA and Air Saint-Pierre resumed on the Saint-Pierre to Sydney route.

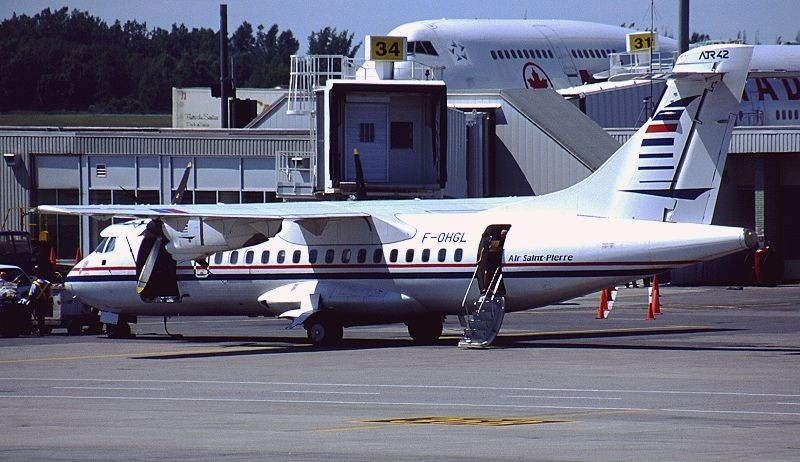
ATR 42 at Halifax Robert L. Stanfield International Airport

A Piper Chieftain was bought in 1981 and a maintenance contract with signed with Fundy Aviation. In 1986 the HS 748 was with a new of the same model and maintenance of the fleet moved to the island the following year. This coincided with the opening of a route from Saint-Pierre to Montreal. The fleet was increased in 1990 with the procurement of a second HS 748.

An ATR 42-320 was bought in 1994 and the following year the two Hawker Siddeleys were sold. The airline opened a service to St. John's with three weekly round trips. Moncton was added as a destination in 2001, with a weekly summer service. The airline bought its Reims-Cessna F406 in 2003 and put into service on the inter-island route. It was chosen in part for its short-run performance. This allowed the Chieftain to be decommissioned the following year. The initial ATR was sold in 2009 and replaced on 21 October with a newer and more modern ATR 42-500.

== Destinations ==
Air Saint-Pierre is based at Saint-Pierre Airport in the French overseas collectivity of Saint-Pierre and Miquelon. It flies up to four round trips a day to the other airport in the collectivity, Miquelon. It makes scheduled services to five airports in Canada, typically operating one to two weekly services to Montreal, three weekly services to St. John's, three to four weekly services to Halifax and two weekly summer services to the Magdalen Islands. Air Saint-Pierre offers transit services in conjunction with Air France flights from Montreal to Paris, and has summer connections via Halifax and Dublin with ASL Airlines France. Air Saint-Pierre flies transatlantic to Paris, once a week during the peak season, are operated by ASL using a Boeing 737-700.

Destinations
City	Province/Territory/Region, Country	Airport	Period
Halifax	Nova Scotia, Canada	Halifax Stanfield International Airport	1965–
Magdalen Islands	Quebec, Canada	Îles-de-la-Madeleine Airport	2018–
Miquelon	Saint-Pierre and Miquelon, France	Miquelon Airport	1979–
Moncton	New Brunswick, Canada	Greater Moncton International Airport	2001–2009
Montreal	Quebec, Canada	Montréal-Pierre Elliott Trudeau International Airport	1987–
Saint-Pierre	Saint-Pierre and Miquelon, France	Saint-Pierre Airport	1965–
St. John's	Newfoundland and Labrador, Canada	St. John's International Airport	1996–
Stephenville	Newfoundland and Labrador, Canada	Stephenville International Airport	2007–2018
Deer Lake	Newfoundland and Labrador, Canada	Deer Lake Regional Airport	2019–
Sydney	Nova Scotia, Canada	Sydney/J.A. Douglas McCurdy Airport	1971–2017
Paris	Île-de-France, France	Charles de Gaulle Airport	2018–

== Fleet ==
=== Current fleet ===
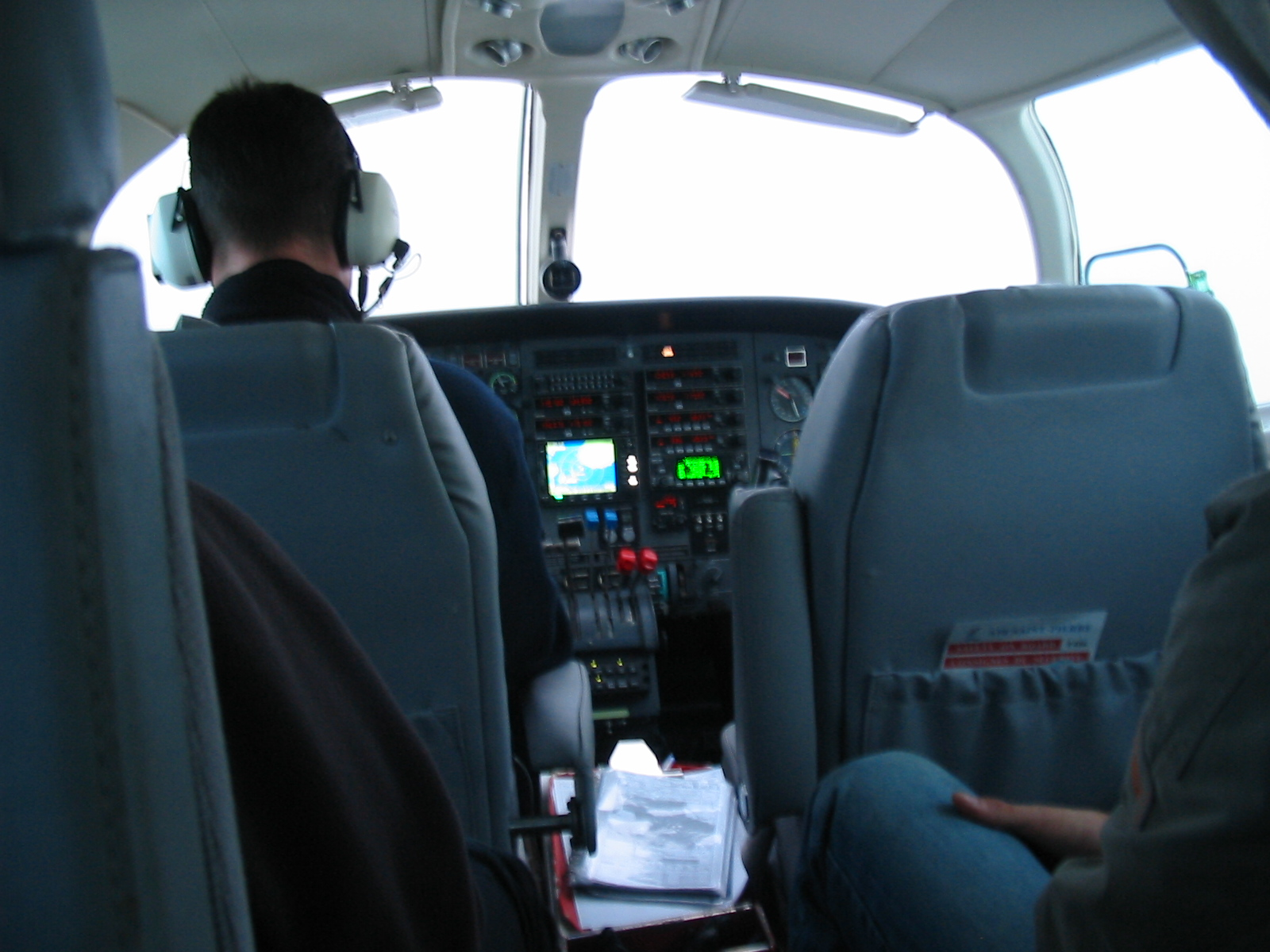
Inside the cabin of the Air Saint-Pierre Reims-Cessna F406

The airline operates the following aircraft:

Air Saint-Pierre fleet
Aircraft	In service	Orders	Passengers	Notes
ATR 42-600	1	—	46	(as of August 2025)
Total	1	—		

=== Fleet timeline ===
List of aircraft operated by Air Saint-Pierre
Aircraft	Number	Period
ATR 42-320	1	1994–2009
ATR 42-500	1	2009–2020 Replaced by ATR 42-600 "F-ORLB"
ATR 42-600	1	2020–present Replacing "F-OFSP"
Beechcraft Model 18	1	1971–1974
Douglas DC-3	1	1974–1976
Hawker Siddeley HS 748	2	1976–1995
Piper PA-23 Aztec	1	1966–1997
Piper PA-31-350 Chieftain	1	1981–2004
Reims-Cessna F406	2	2003–2026
