= Saint-Pierre Pointe-Blanche Airport =

Regional airport in Saint Pierre and Miquelon

Saint-Pierre Airport Aéroport de Saint-Pierre Pointe-Blanche
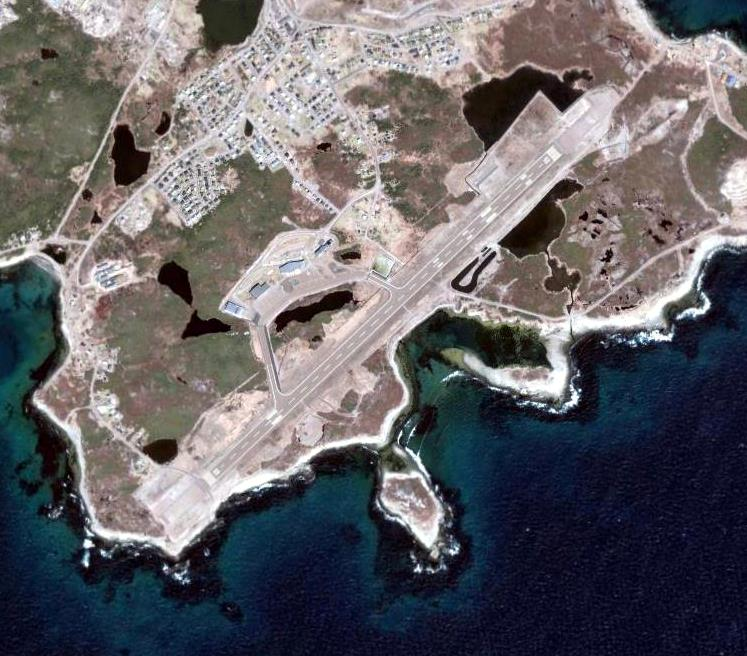
- IATA: FSP; ICAO: LFVP

Summary
- Airport type: Public
- Owner: Service de l'aviation civile de Saint-Pierre et Miquelon
- Operator: Service de l'aviation civile de Saint-Pierre et Miquelon
- Serves: Saint-Pierre, Saint Pierre and Miquelon
- Location: Saint-Pierre-Pointe Blanche
- Elevation AMSL: 26 ft (7.9 m)
- Coordinates: 46°45′47″N 56°10′27″W
- Website: https://saint-pierre.aeroport.pm/

Map
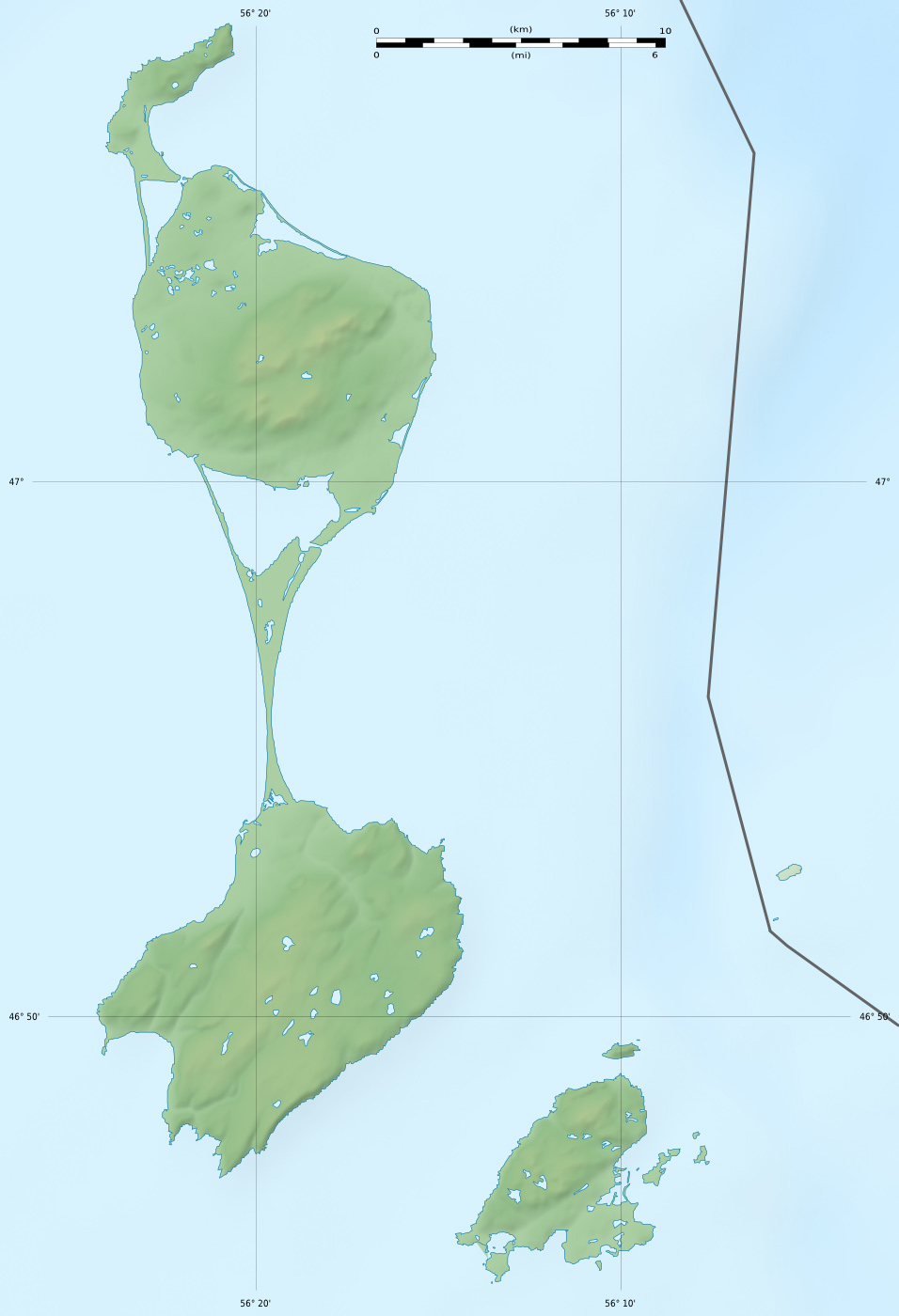
- Location in Saint-Pierre-et-Miquelon and in the North Atlantic LFVP (North Atlantic)

Runways
Direction	Length		Surface
Direction	m	ft	Surface
08/26	1,800	5,906	Asphalt
- Source: French Aeronautical Information Publication for LFVP (PDF) – SAINT-PIERRE

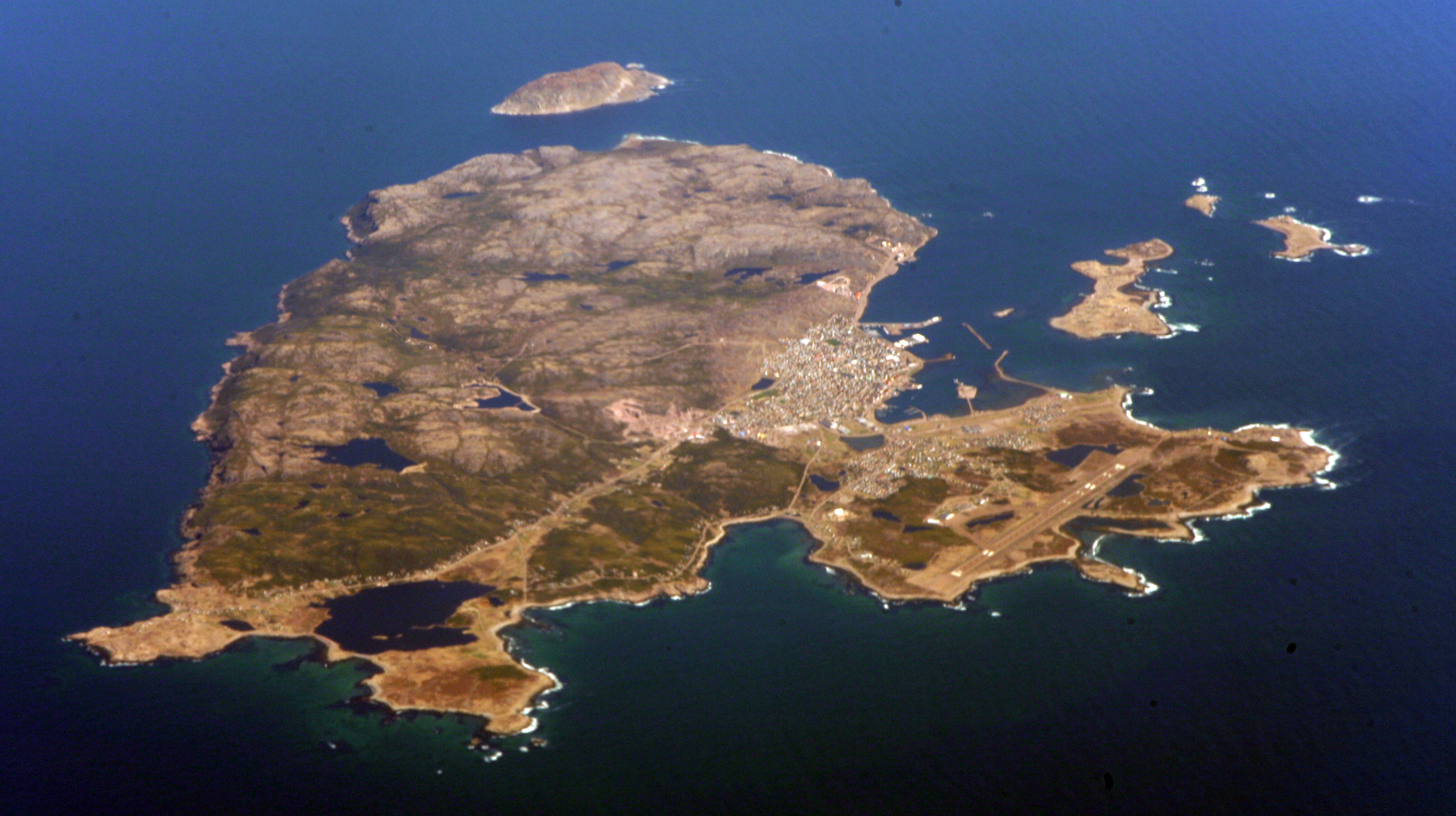
Sainte-Pierre airport at lower right on Saint Pierre Island, 2013

Saint-Pierre Airport (French: Aéroport de Saint-Pierre) (IATA: FSP, ICAO: LFVP) is a regional airport located 1 NM (1.9 km; 1.2 mi) south of Saint-Pierre, in the French overseas collectivity of Saint Pierre and Miquelon, off the east coast of Canada near Newfoundland.

== Overview ==
This new airport replaced the old airport in the middle of the city.

The airport was completed in August 1999 and consists of four buildings and a control tower. The old airport, opened in 1965 and located on the south side of the inner harbour, was re-located due to the lack of room for expansion (The runway is 1,800 metres (5,900 ft), compared to the old 11/29 runway at 1,250 metres (4,100 ft)). The main terminal building is a two-story structure. The old airport is located in the city centre of St. Pierre and is being redeveloped for housing complexes. The control tower, terminal building, hangar, and part of the old runway (mark number 29) are intact. The airport project cost 370 million French francs.

== Facilities ==
- 2,200 m^{2} (24,000 sq ft) passenger terminal
- 1,600 m^{2} (17,000 sq ft) maintenance building to store snow plows
- 2,500 m^{2} (27,000 sq ft) aircraft hangars and workshop
- 1,400 m^{2} (15,000 sq ft) civil aviation buildings

The airport handles turboprop aircraft and Boeing 737.

All other aircraft at the airport are private aircraft for general aviation.

== Airline and destinations ==
Airlines	Destinations
Air Saint-Pierre	Halifax, Miquelon, Montréal–Trudeau, St. John's (NL); Seasonal: Îles-de-la-Madeleine, Paris–Charles de Gaulle

In July 2018, the first non-stop flights from the islands to mainland France launched on Air Saint-Pierre with seasonal summer service from Saint-Pierre directly to Charles de Gaulle Airport in Paris operated by an ASL Airlines France Boeing 737. Previously, all connecting traffic to mainland France was done through airports in Canada, such as Halifax or Montréal–Trudeau.

== Gallery - Saint-Pierre Pointe-Blanche Airport (FSP) ==
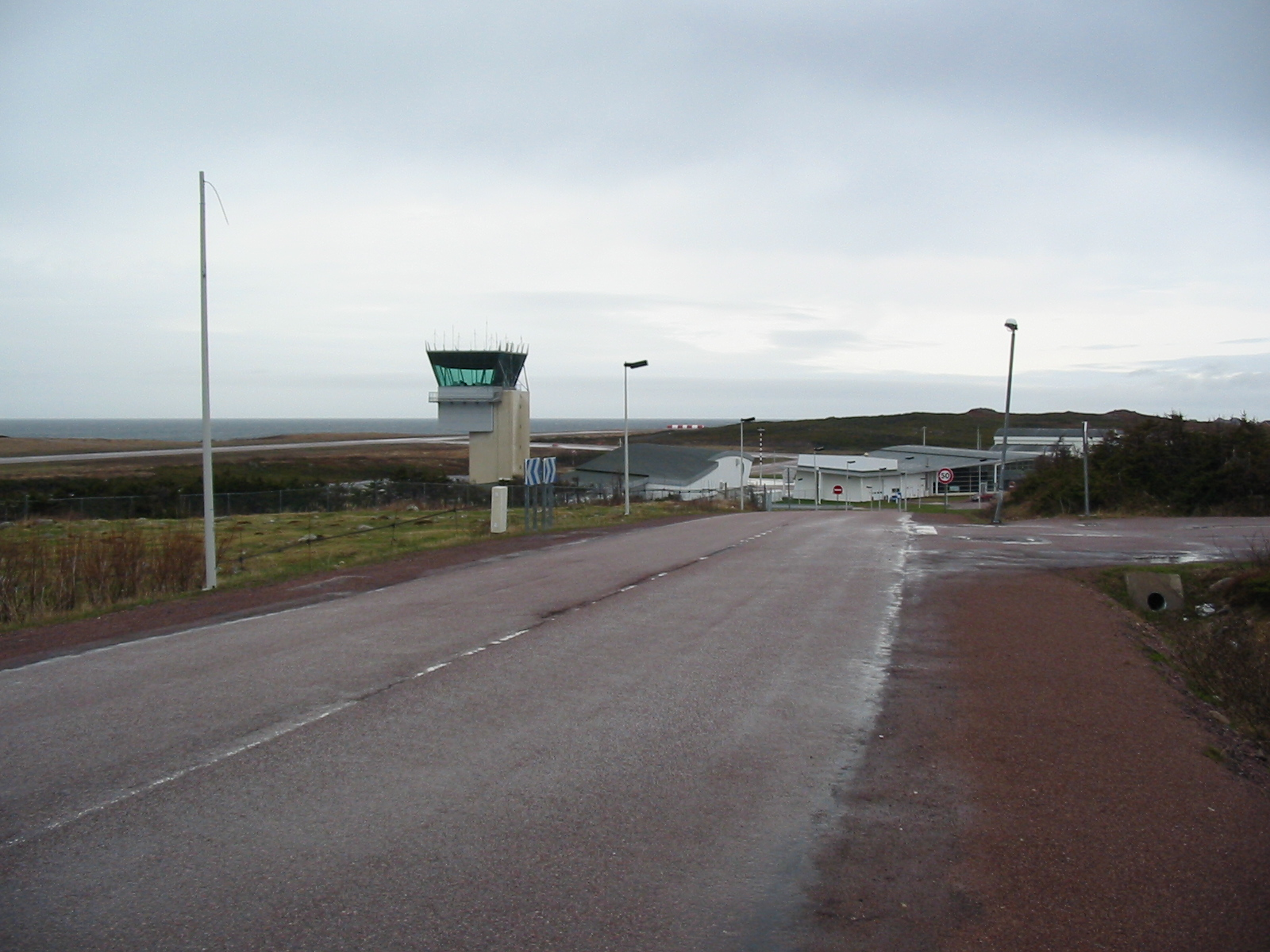
Saint-Pierre Airport from the road

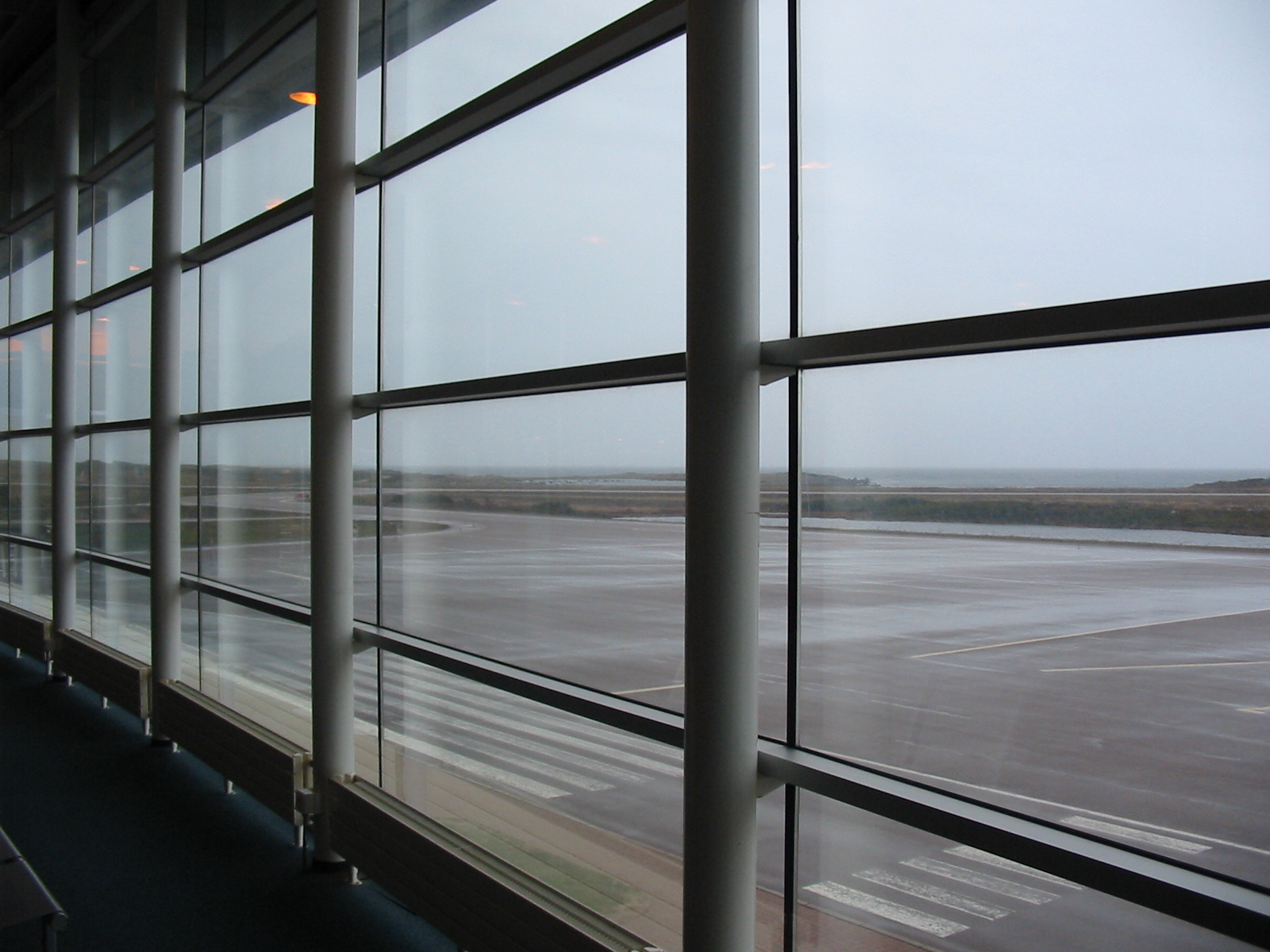
Saint-Pierre airfield from the terminal

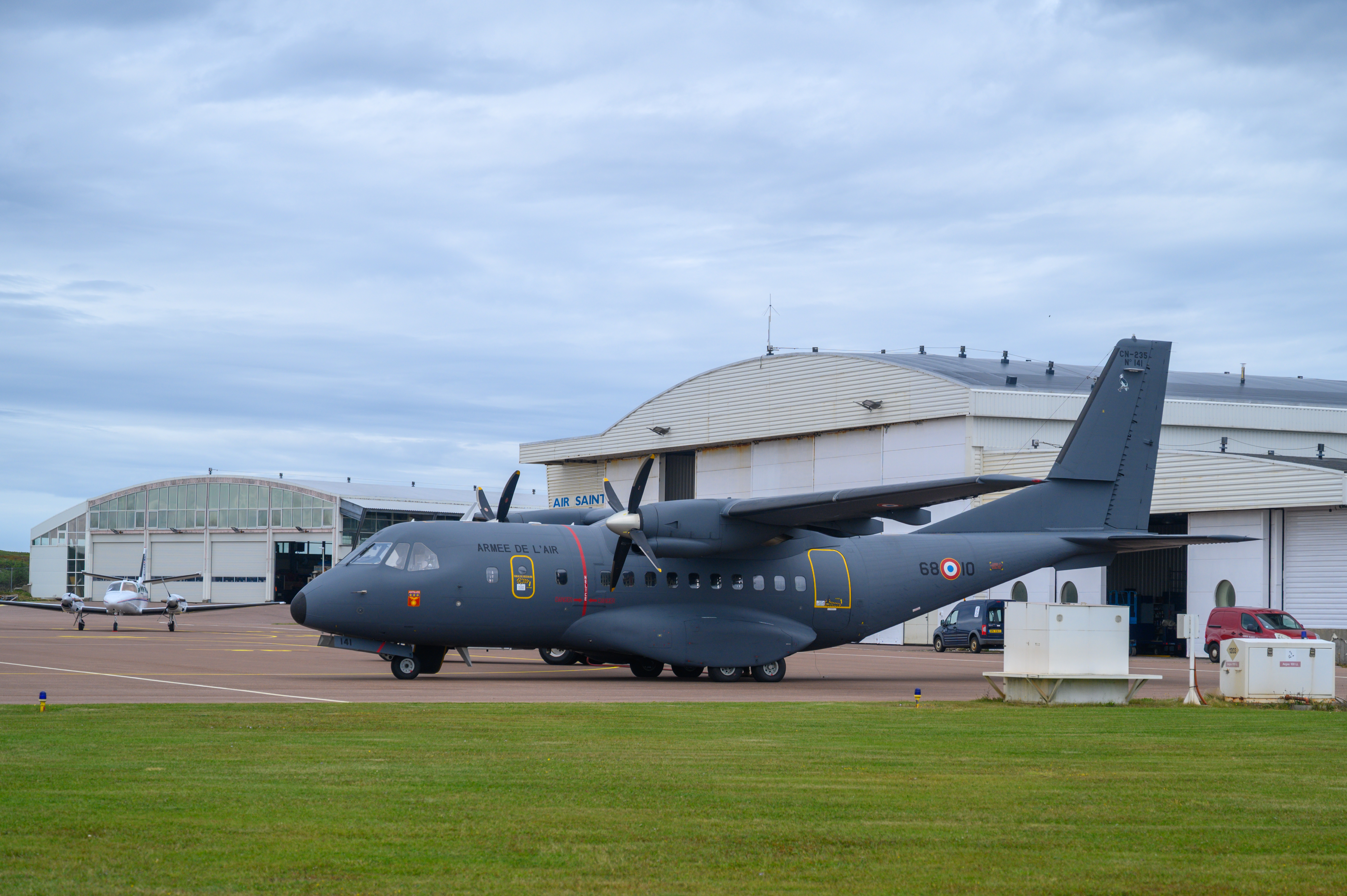
French Armée de l'air military aircraft at aerodrome

== See also ==
- List of airports in Saint Pierre and Miquelon
- Miquelon Airport
- Transport in Saint Pierre and Miquelon
