= Miquelon Airport =

Miquelon Airport Aéroport de Miquelon
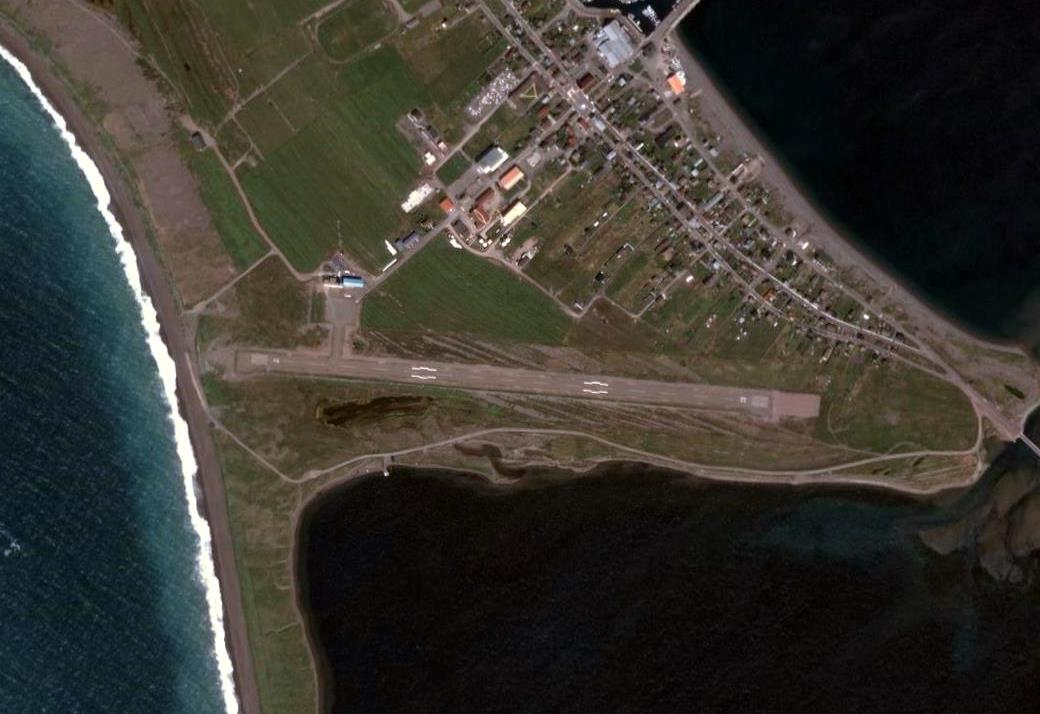
- IATA: MQC; ICAO: LFVM

Summary
- Airport type: Public
- Operator: Direction de l'équipement
- Serves: Miquelon-Langlade
- Location: Miquelon Island
- Elevation AMSL: 10 ft (3.0 m)
- Coordinates: 47°05′45″N 56°23′04″W

Map
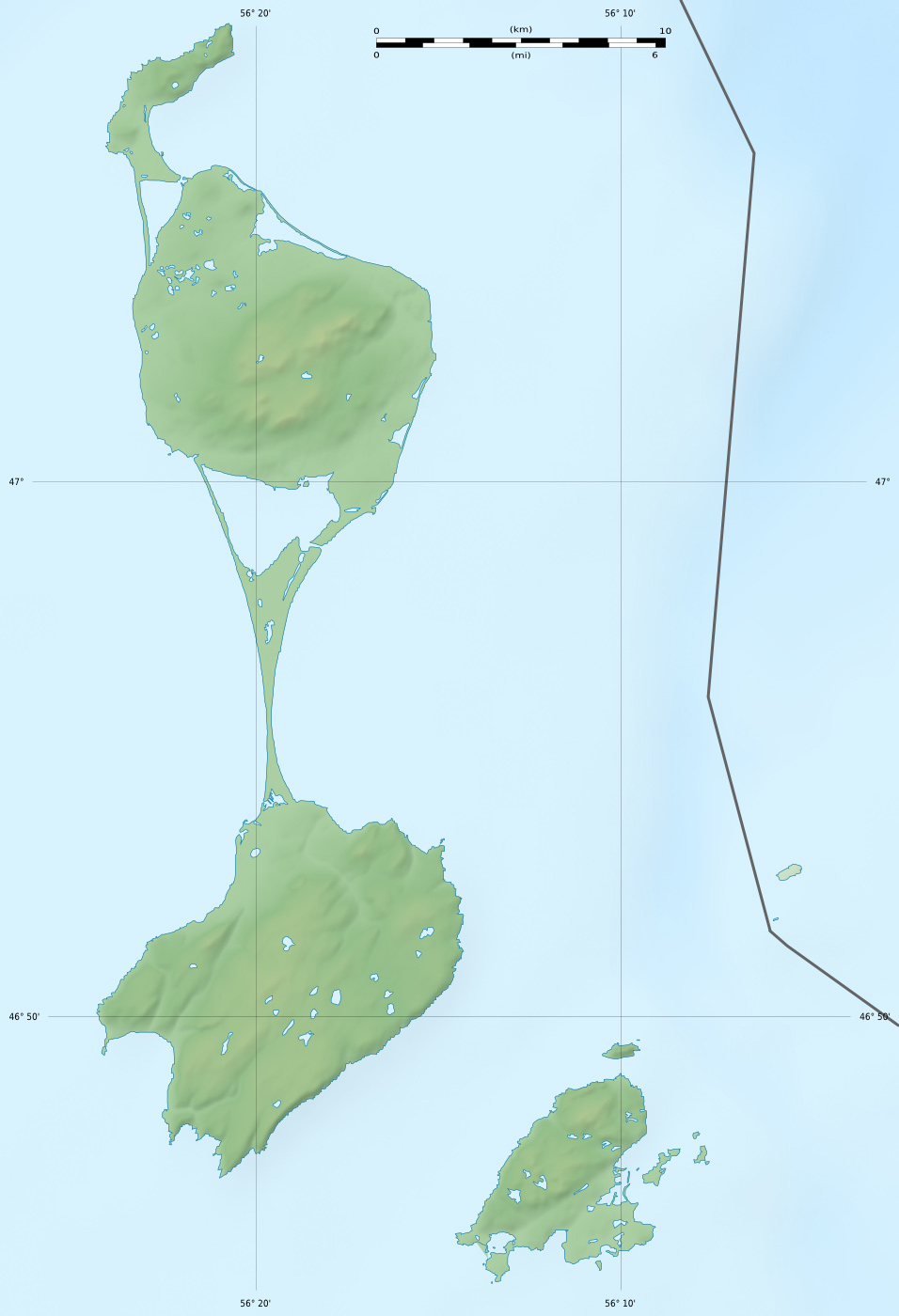
- Location in North America LFVM (North Atlantic)

Runways
Direction	Length		Surface
Direction	m	ft	Surface
12/30	1,000	3,281	Asphalt
- Source: AIP

Miquelon Airport (French: Aéroport de Miquelon) (IATA: MQC, ICAO: LFVM) is a regional airport on Miquelon Island that serves the commune (municipality) of Miquelon-Langlade, in the French overseas community (collectivité d'outre-mer) of Saint Pierre and Miquelon, off the eastern coast of North America in the Gulf of St. Lawrence.

== Overview ==
The main passenger building contains the check-in counters (small structure) connected with the control tower and firefighting station located in the larger service building.

== Airline and destination ==
Airlines	Destinations
Air Saint-Pierre	Saint-Pierre

Miquelon is in France but there are no direct flights to or from mainland France.

To travel to mainland France, passengers must first fly or take the ferry to Saint-Pierre. From there they can either fly to Montréal–Trudeau airport and transfer onto direct flights to Paris (CDG and Orly). Alternatively, once a week during the summer season, there is a direct ASL Airlines France flight from Saint-Pierre to Paris, which has been operating again since 2023 after being suspended during 2021 and 2022 due to COVID-19.

The airport's runways are capable of handling turboprop or small jet aircraft only.

== Gallery ==
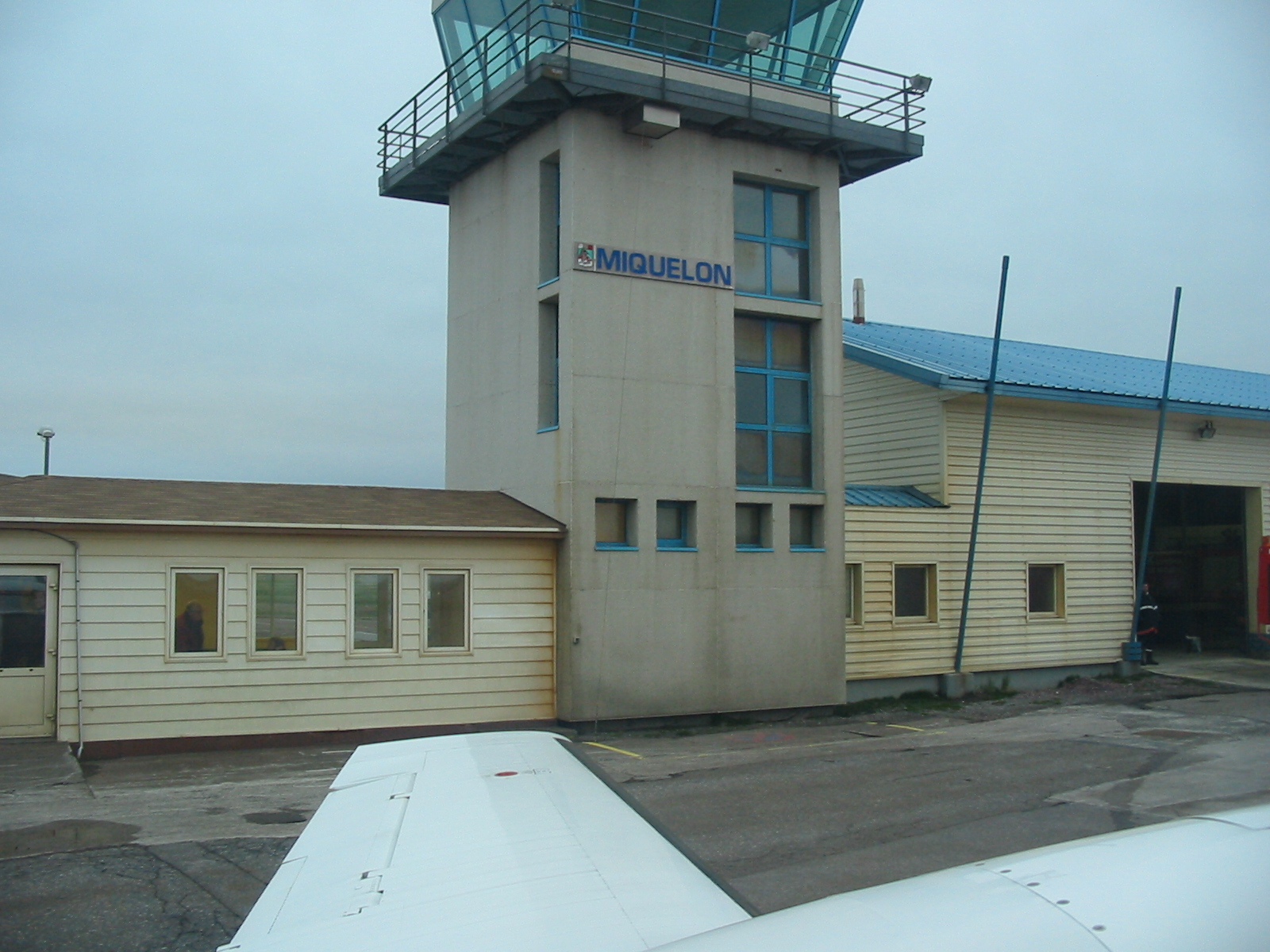
Landing at the Miquelon Airport; May 15, 2008

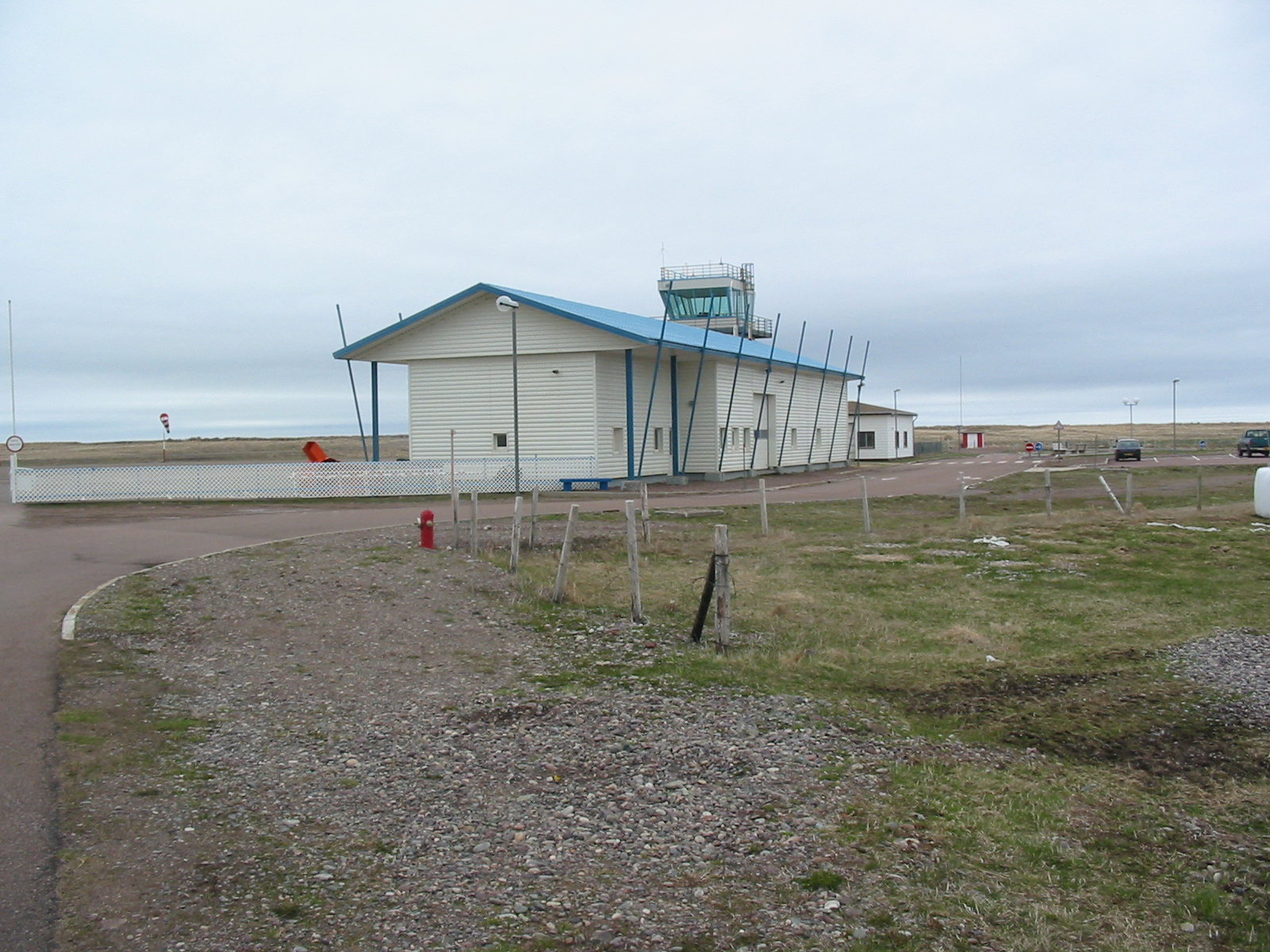
Miquelon Airport; May 15, 2008

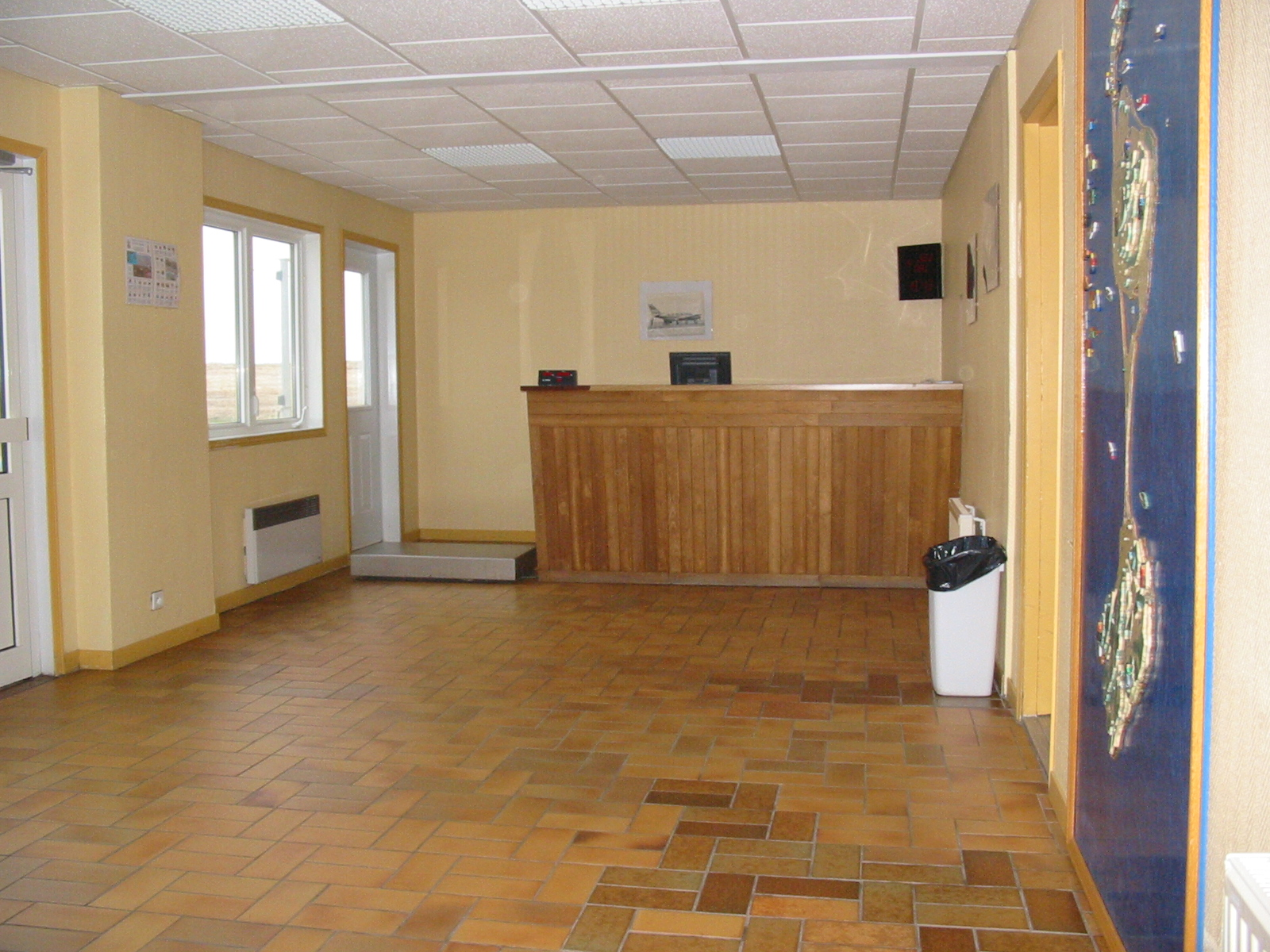
Check-in Desk at the Miquelon Airport

== See also ==
- Saint-Pierre Airport
- Transport in Saint Pierre and Miquelon
- List of airports in Saint Pierre and Miquelon
