= Île aux Vainqueurs =

Island in France

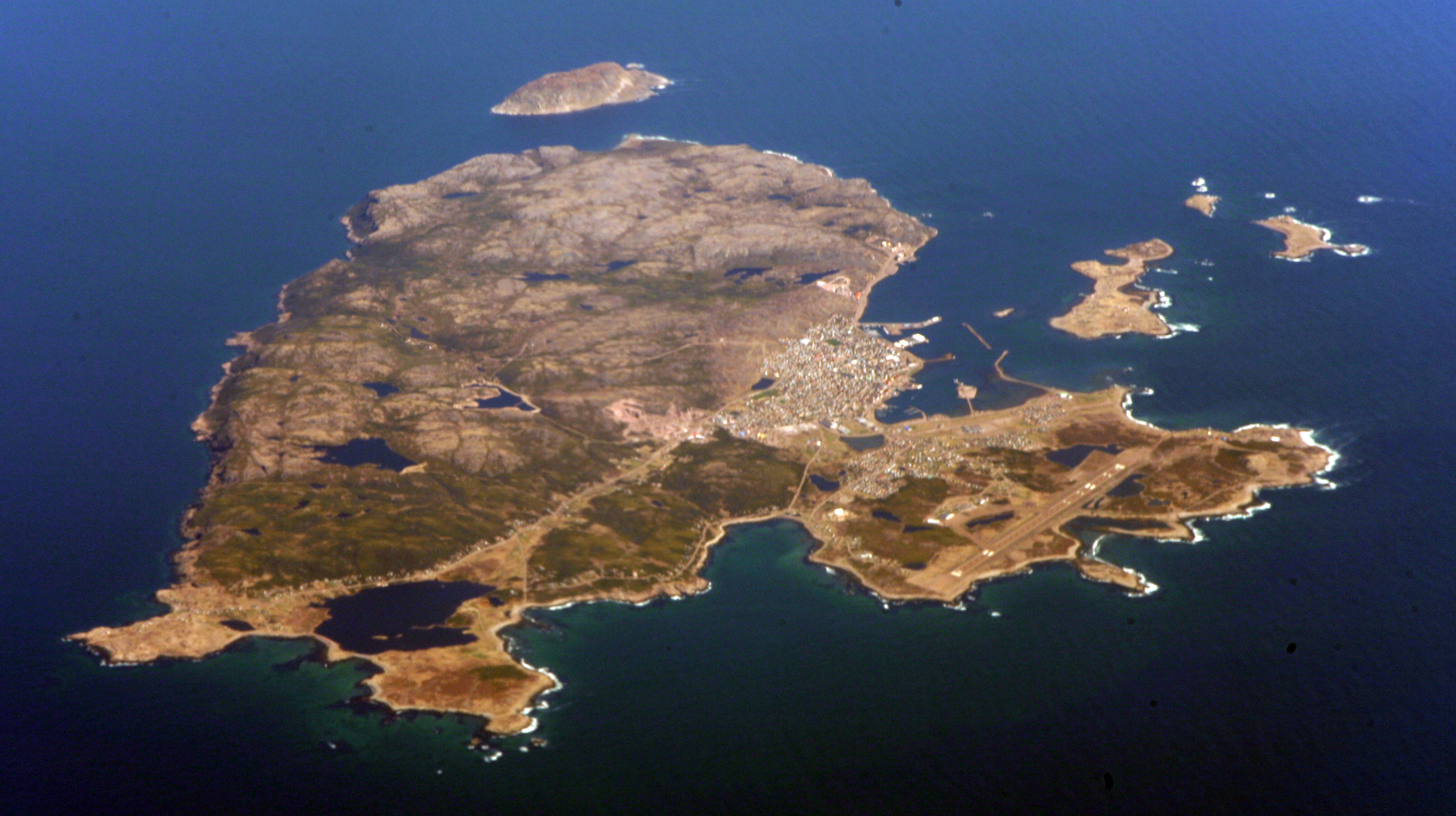
- Saint-Pierre and Miquelon aerial photo, 2013. Île aux Vainqueurs is at the top right.
- Interactive map of Île aux Vainqueurs

Geography
- Coordinates: 46°47′25″N 56°08′01″W
- Area: 2 km^{2} (0.77 sq mi)
- Highest elevation: 25 m (82 ft)

Administration
- Saint Pierre and Miquelon

Île aux Vainqueurs (French pronunciation: [il o vɛ̃kœʁ], Isle of Winners/Vanquishers) is a small uninhabited island located about 2 kilometres (1.2 mi) off the coast of Saint-Pierre and Miquelon, a self-governing territorial overseas collectivity of France and the last remaining part of New France in North America.

The island is flat and low on the water similar to the neighboring and larger island Île aux Marins. Its length is just over 650 metres (2,130 ft) running north to south and covers less than 2 square kilometres (0.77 sq mi). The island, along with neighboring Île aux Pigeons are popular sites for gulls, for which in 2018, 294 nests were counted and recorded.

The island has remained uninhabited except for being occasionally used as a quarantine site between 1869, when a war brig, Le Curieux, passed through with cases of yellow fever, and 1915, when it was decommissioned.
