= Île-aux-Marins =

Small uninhabited island off the coast of Saint-Pierre and Miquelon

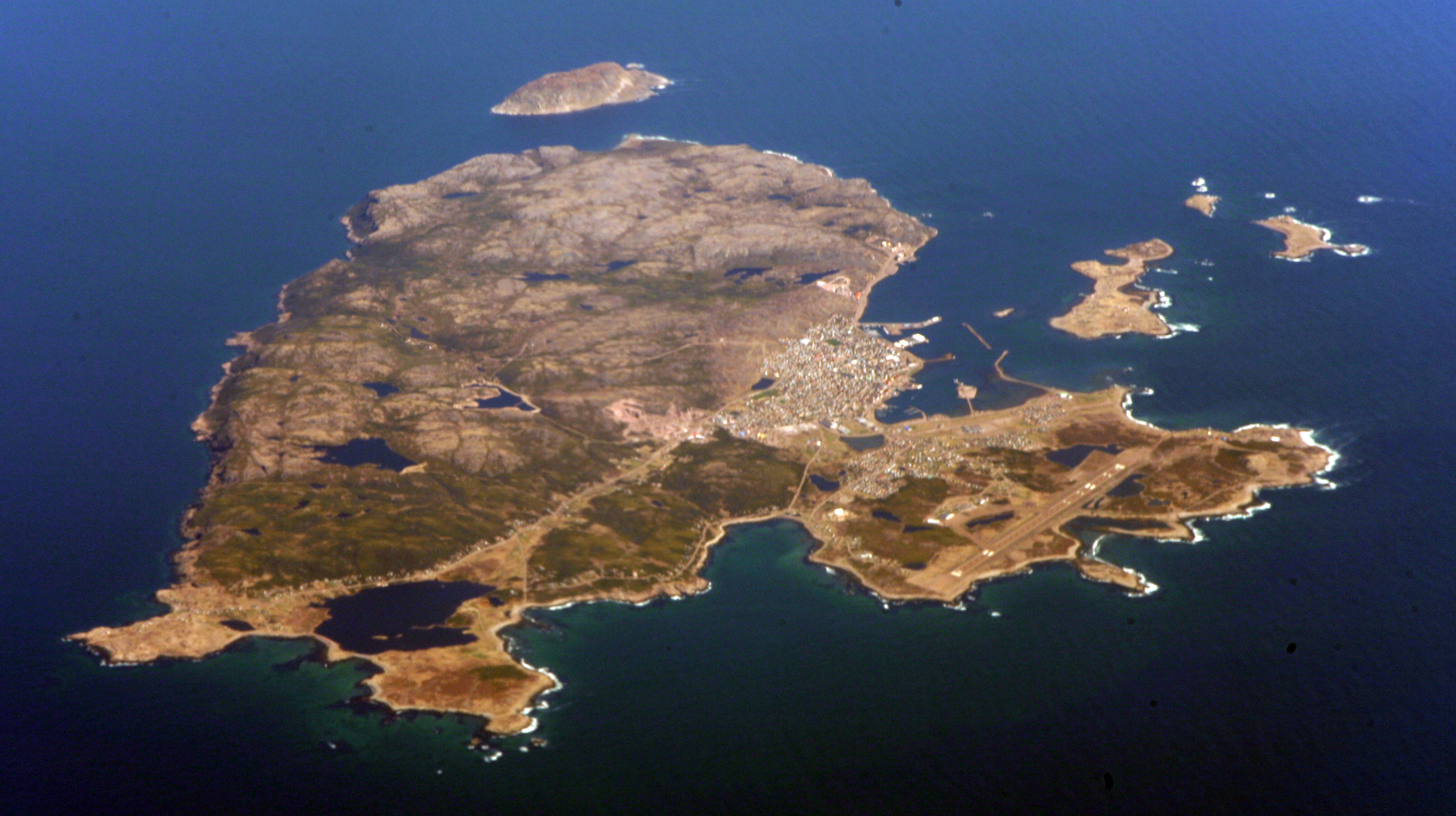
- Saint-Pierre and Miquelon aerial photo, 2013. Île-aux-Marins is at the top right.
- Interactive map of Île-aux-Marins

Geography
- Coordinates: 46°47′10″N 56°09′00″W
- Highest point: Cape Beaudry 35 metres (115 ft)

Administration
- Saint Pierre and Miquelon

Demographics
- Population: 0 with some seasonal residents in summer

Location of Île-aux-Marins vs. Saint-Pierre town

Île-aux-Marins (French pronunciation: [lil o maʁɛ̃], literally "Island of the Sailors"; before 1931 called Île-aux-Chiens [il o ʃjɛ̃], literally "Island of the Dogs") is a small uninhabited island located off the coast of Saint-Pierre and Miquelon.

== History ==
Île-aux-Marins was settled in 1604 and once had a population approaching 700.

It was a commune until 1945, when it was annexed by the commune of Saint-Pierre.

Since the 1960s, the town has become a ghost town after the last of the population left for Saint Pierre Island; however, a small number of people live there on a seasonal basis between May and November. Several of the town's buildings are still standing, among them are the church (Eglise Notre-Dame-des-Marins), the Jézéquel house, a number of fisherman's homes, and the Archipélitude Museum located in the town's former school. Several of the buildings were designated with protected status by the French Ministry of Culture in 2011, with the addition of the Jézéquel house in 2014.

The bow section of the wrecked ship Transpacific, which grounded near the islands in 1971, is located on the northern side of the island and is still accessible.

== Geography ==
The island is 1,500 metres (0.93 mi) long with its width varying from 100 to 400 metres (330–1,310 ft). The highest point, Cape Beaudry, is only 35 metres (115 ft) above mean sea level and is also located on the northern end of the island.

Two smaller islands, Île aux Vainqueurs and Île aux Pigeons, are located to the northeast of the island.

== Island life ==
=== Cod fishing ===
Residents used to fish for cod every year from April to October. In winter, cod left the archipelago and migrated to the Grand Banks.

=== Dories and wherries ===
On the water, dories and the lighter wherries were used. They were built with the clinker method, with oars or sails, until the First World War. Then, builders added engines and then propellers. The original shape of the boat remained the same. They had a crew of two, the skipper and the seaman (often a son so that he could learn the skills).

=== Cafés ===
Several cafés animated the prosperous island in the 1900s:

- Café de la France (see below)
- Café de la Liberté, run by Mr and Mrs Couétil, next to the football field
- Café Delanoé, located before the cannons, property of Bertrand Delanoe's (former mayor of Paris) ancestors
- Café Marie-Ange stood just above Trehouard Cove

== Buildings and other landmarks ==
=== Archipelitude museum (former school) ===
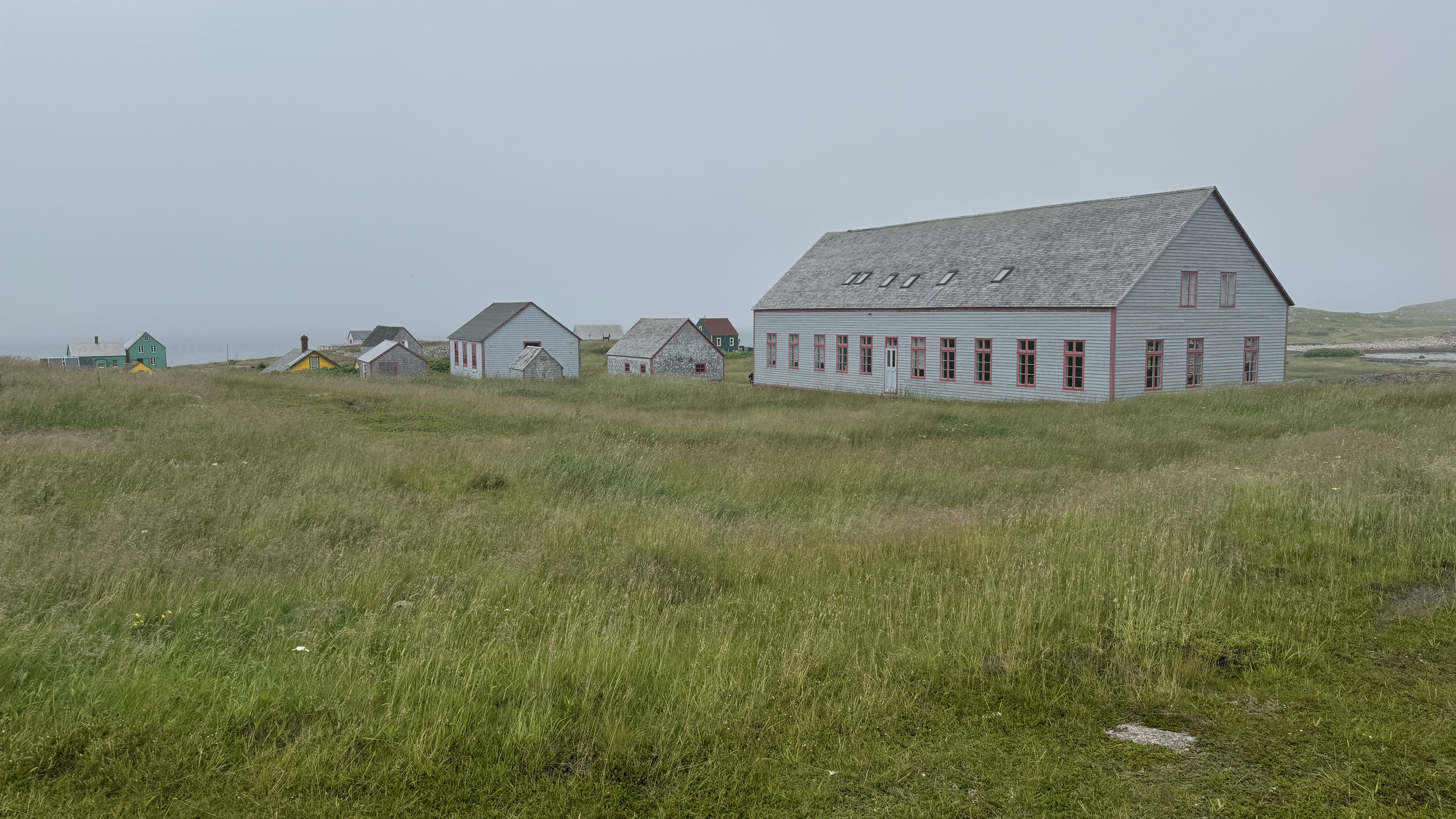
Former school, now home to the Archipélitude museum

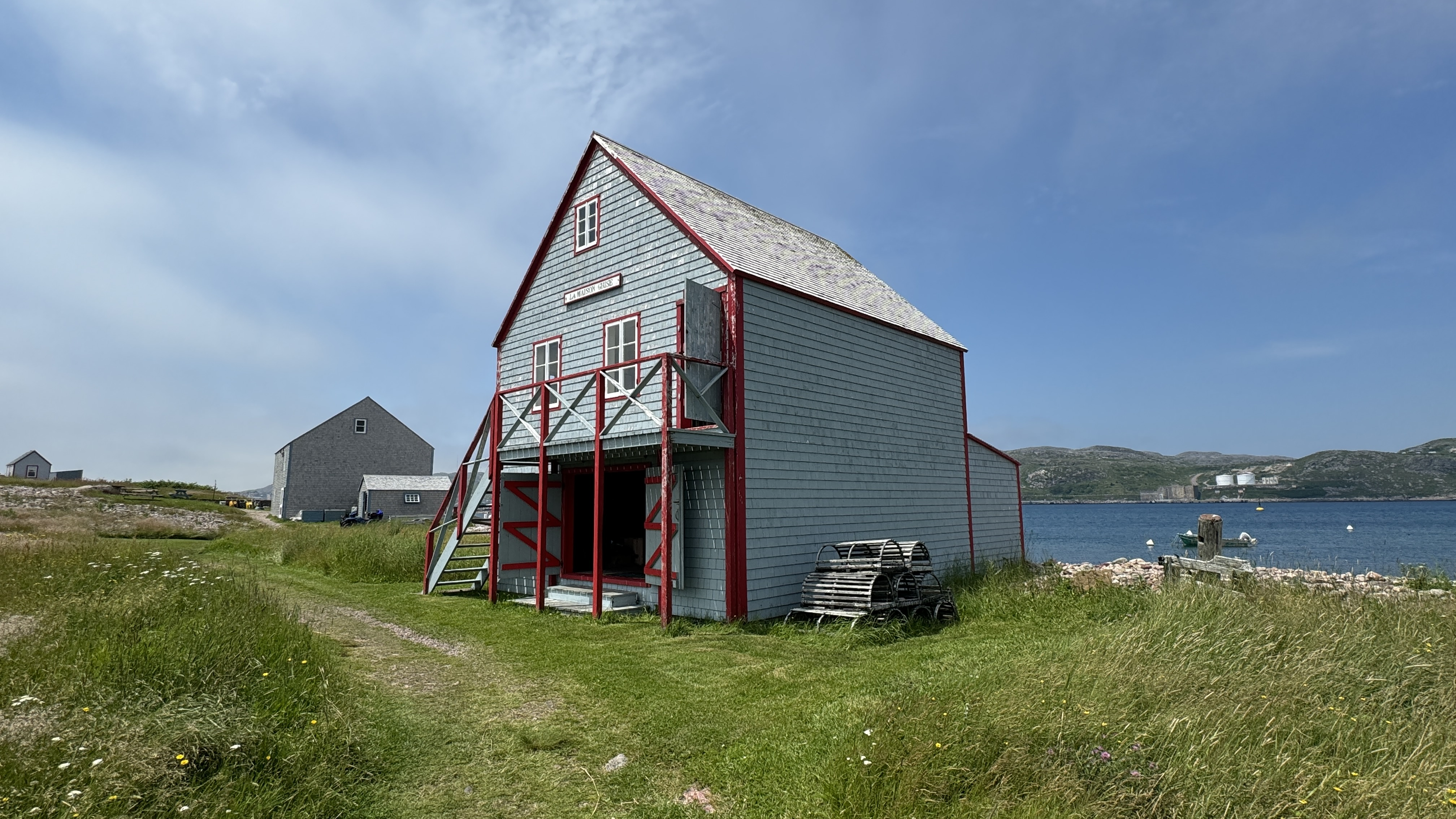
Maison Grise in front, Maison Jézéquel behind

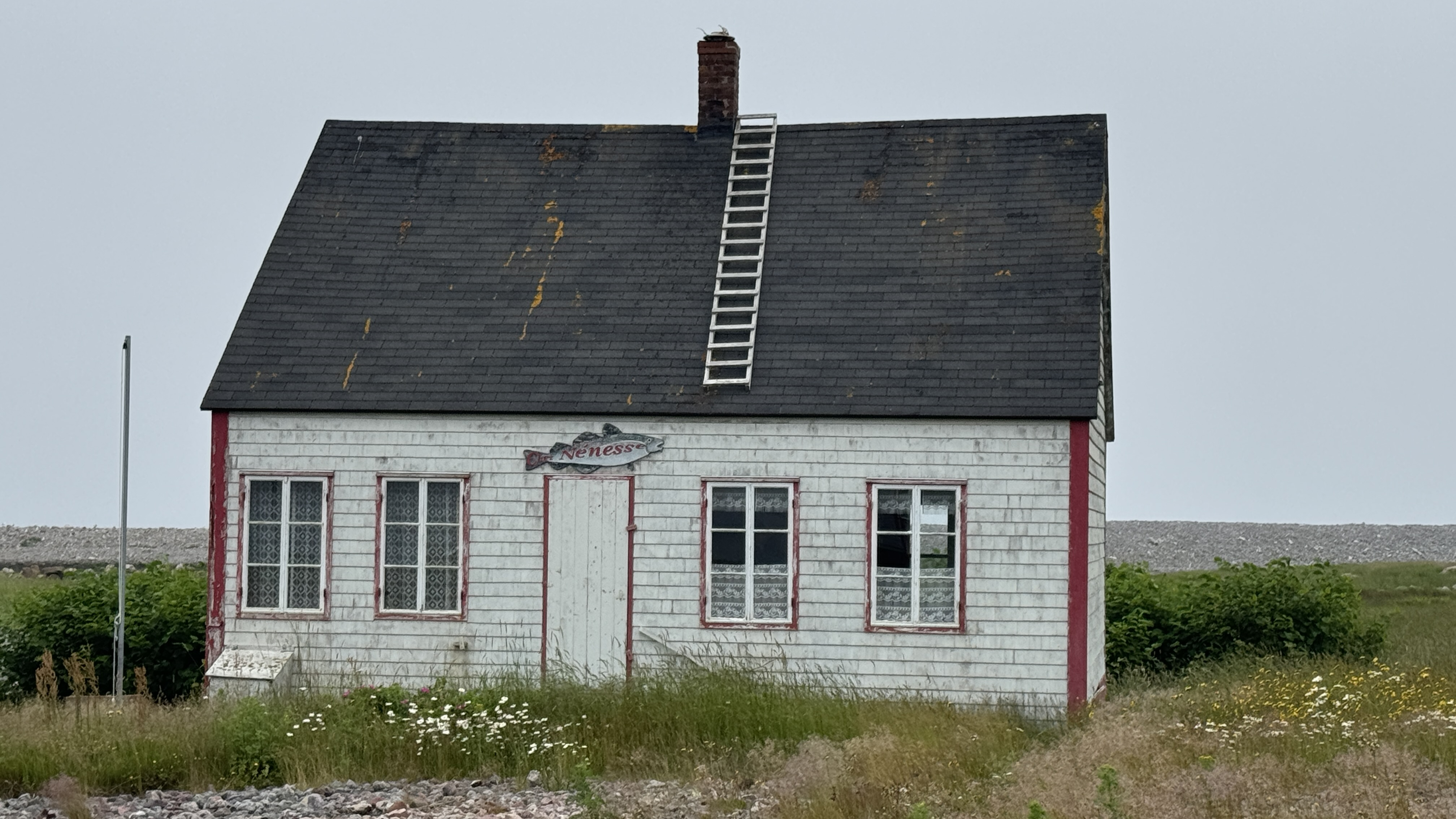
Maison Nénesse

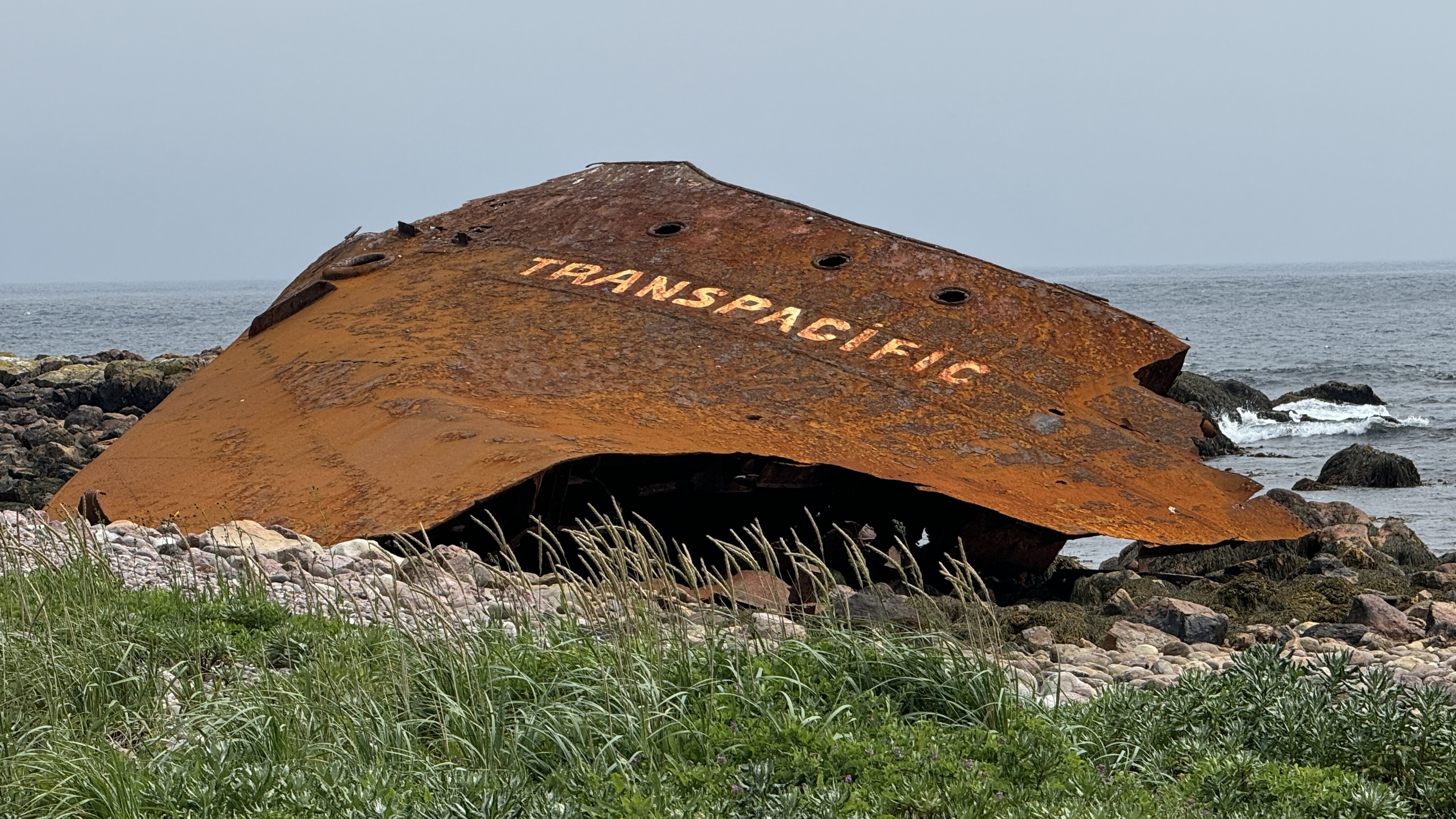
Wreck of the Transpacific

The island's first school was a humble private institution which was run by a certain Miss Quémart in 1863. Young islanders ages 6 through 12 attended. Later on, a Miss Chevalier took charge of the young girls' education and from 1874 to 1903, while the Brothers Ploërmel taught the young boys. In 1892, three boys passed the primary school certificate, the only one delivered each year until the creation of the elementary certificate in 1903. In 1903, school becomes secular and mixed and the Brothers have to leave. With the decline of fishing and the migration to Saint-Pierre, the school gradually lost its pupils until 1963 when Bernard Borotra, the last primary school teacher, decided to close it for good. The school building is owned by the city of Saint-Pierre, and was restored in the 1980s and in 1988 used to house the Archipelitude Museum, the island's heritage museum.

=== Café de la France (foundation) ===
One of the most important cabarets of the island was the Café de la France, also called the Café Nouvel, of which the foundations remain. The parents of Joseph Nouvel, a photographer, and Alexis Nouvel, the last inhabitant of the island, owned the café, which was the hub of social life for both the island residents and French fishermen during their stopovers. It hosted lively evening dances. On the ground floor, rooms were used for commerce, the dining room, the dancing hall, the cafe, the kitchen, the private living room and the boudoir. The first floor was for bedrooms only. With fishing in decline, the owners left the island in the 1920s and sold their property, which continued to thrive through the 1940s. The café building was disassembled and reconstructed on Saint Pierre, and is the George Jackman House today.

=== Maison Grise ===
The Maison Grise (French: The Grey House) was originally a fishing shed (saline in French) of a certain Mr. Victor Patrice. In 1923, he bought Roger Girardin's estate which included the house, the garden, the shed and slipway. Inshore fishermen stored their fishing tools, hooks, lines, and boxes; engine parts, and for hunting their shotguns and bird decoys. The shed was also a meeting point where fishermen discussed the fish catch and the selling price of cod, but also about merchants' unfair (as they saw it) terms of trade when bartering food for their fish.

The Grey House displays a dory, which fishermen used until the 1910s, along with waries. In 1911, some more prosperous fishermen started to equip their dories with engines until in 1913, a government grant allowed all fishermen to do so, which led to a tripling of the fish catch overall. Every year by the end of November, fishermen repaired all the dories and riggings the activity in the fishing shed stopped.

=== Maison Laloi ===
The Lalois, father and sons, were dory builders, like the Jouvins, the Jorets and the Jolivets. The Laloi family started to build waries and dories in 1859. The Lalois bought the Maison Laloi in 1972 from the Transatlantic General Company and passed it on to their children Henri and Armand. The family renovated the house in 1923. At the time it was said to be the prettiest house in the village. It was covered with recycled materials such as boards from whisky crates, which were very popular at the time of Prohibition. Another originality was the transport of materials during the winter of 1923. Thanks to the freezing cold, people could walk across between the island and Saint Pierre over the frozen barachois (coastal lagoon).

=== Maison Nénesse ===
Ernest Patrice, whose friends nicknamed him Nénesse and mister mayor was one of the last inshore fishermen, along with Bernard Teletchéa and Jean Disnard. Nénesse fished with his dory Le Caprice des Mers ("The Caprice of the Seas") from 1959 to 1973, then until 1983 with his second dory Le Jouet des Flots ("The Toy of the Stream/Flood"). He was born in November 1920 on the Île aux Chiens then lived in the grey house Maison Nénesse on Île aux Marins. He was a lifelong bachelor, avid story-teller and constantly hosted guests who gathered there to play cards. After 1963, Nénesse lived in Saint-Pierre in the winter where he frequented Café le Joinville. In the spring, he would return to Marins. Nénesse died on March 4, 2006.

=== Notre-Dame-des-Marins ===
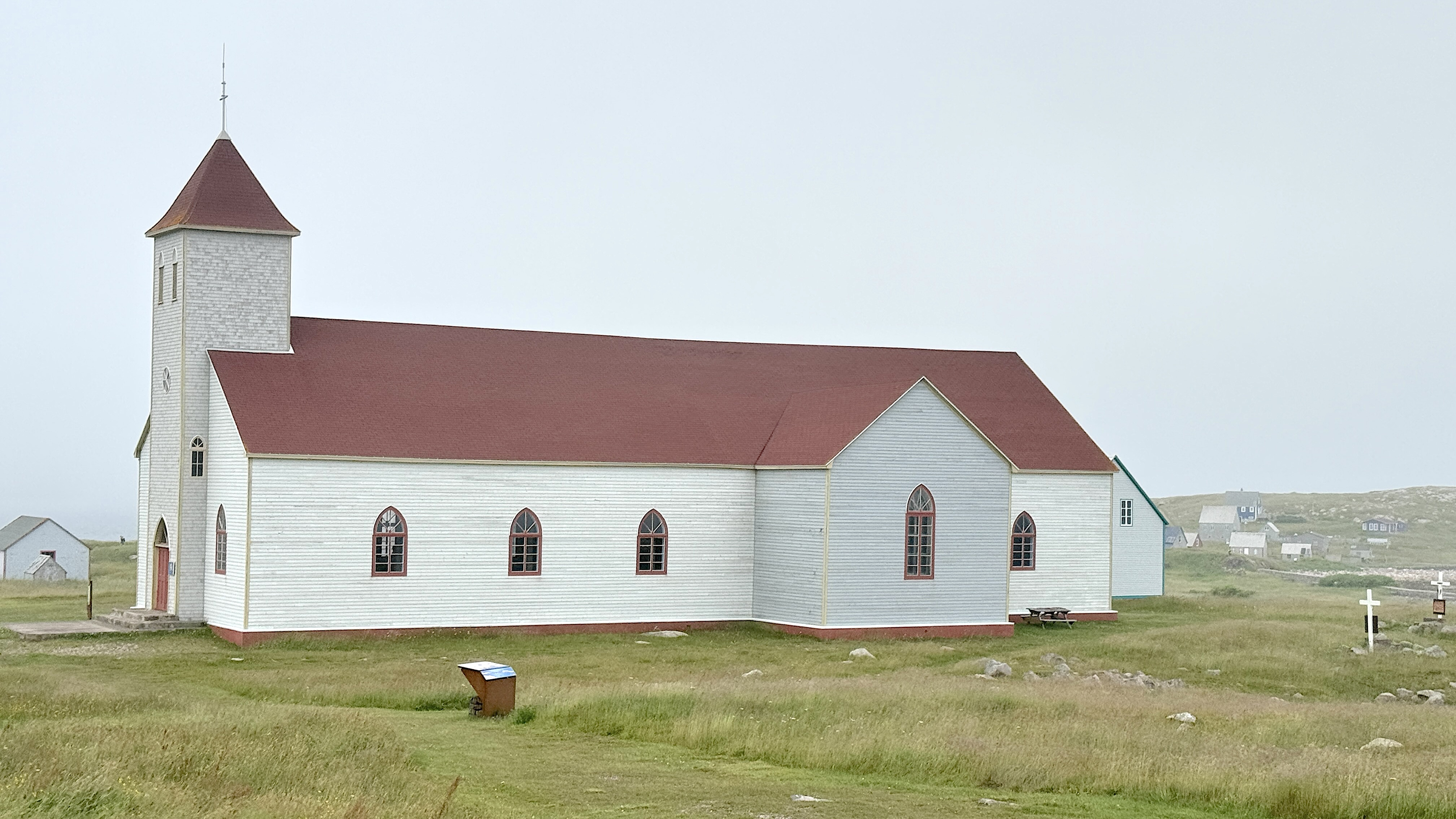

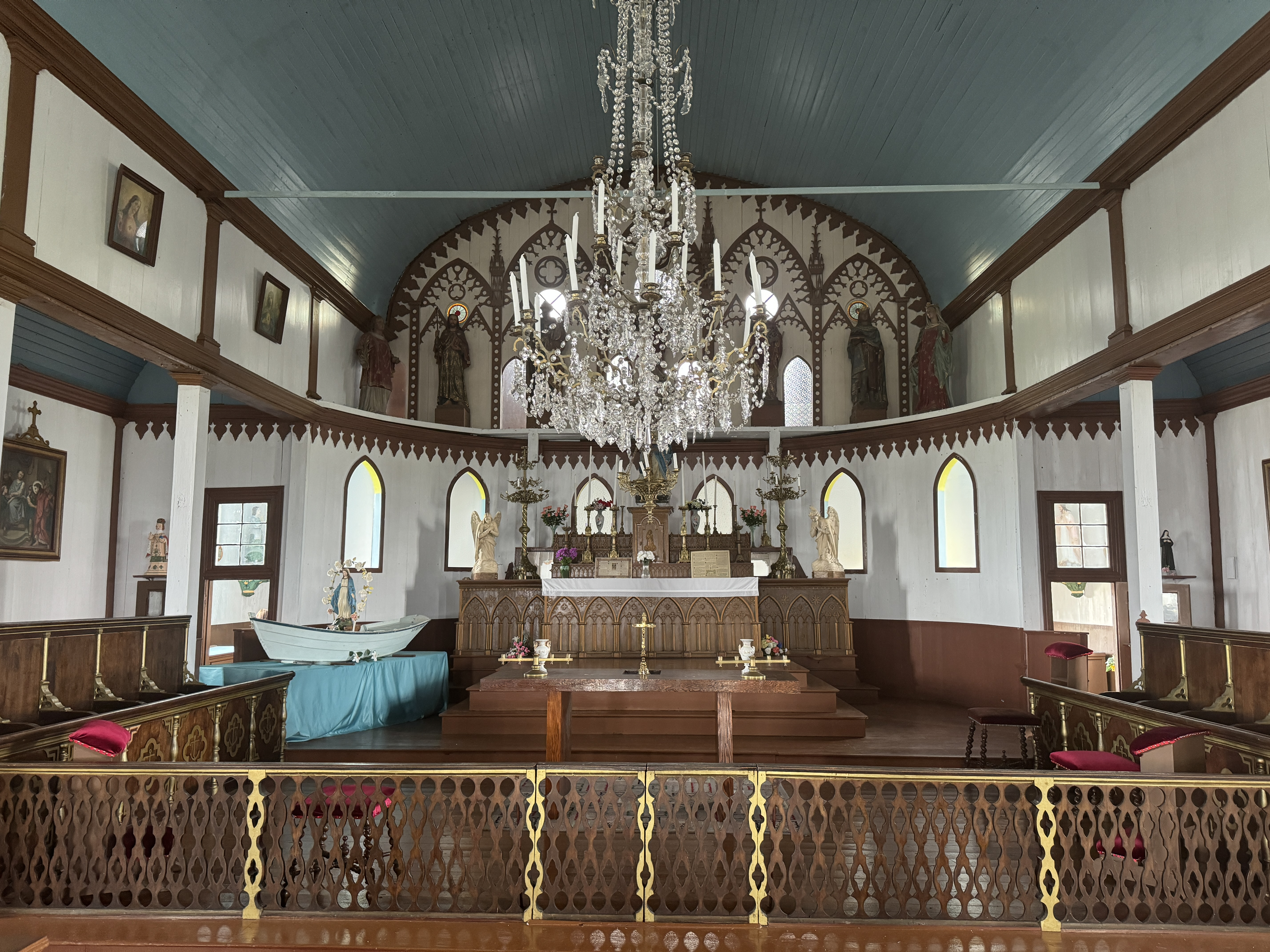

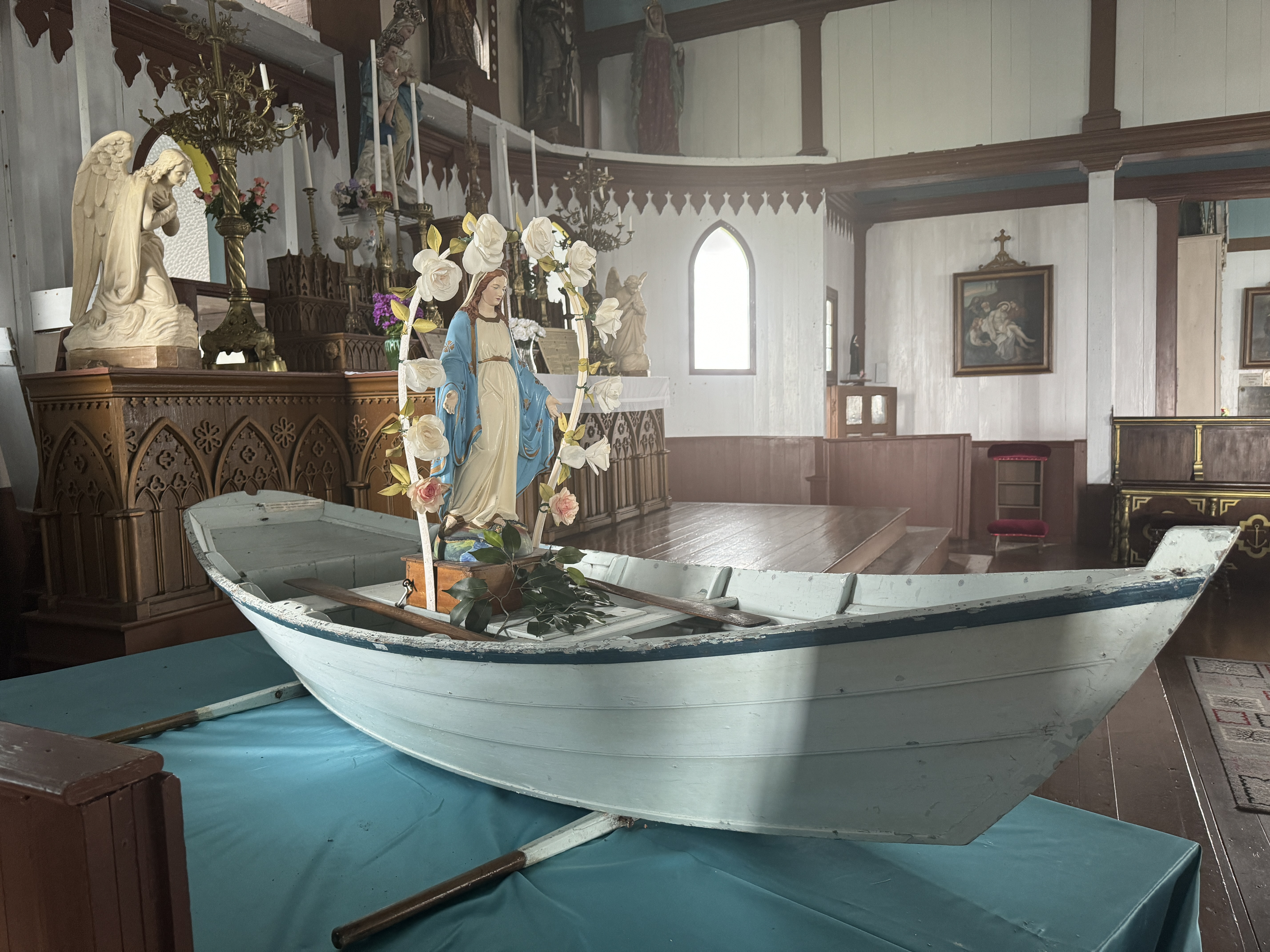

Notre-Dame-des-Marins^{(fr)} is the island's church, built 1872, has maintained its original furnishings, including a large black-wrapped catafalque, used for carrying coffins.

=== Transpacific shipwreck ===
The Transpacific was a German cargo ship that wrecked on the island's reefs on 18 May 1971. There were no deaths or injuries. It had departed from Montreal towards northern Europe to transport aluminum and various types of equipment. Aware that there were technical problems, the captain contacted the Saint-Pierre marine station to stop outside the port and allow technicians to board. However, a storm took the ship right over the island's reefs. Once the cargo was abandoned, numerous dories surrounded the ship to retrieve the cargo including lawnmowers, preserves (jam/jelly), and jukeboxes. Objects from the ship are on display at the Archipélitude museum on the island.

== Gallery ==
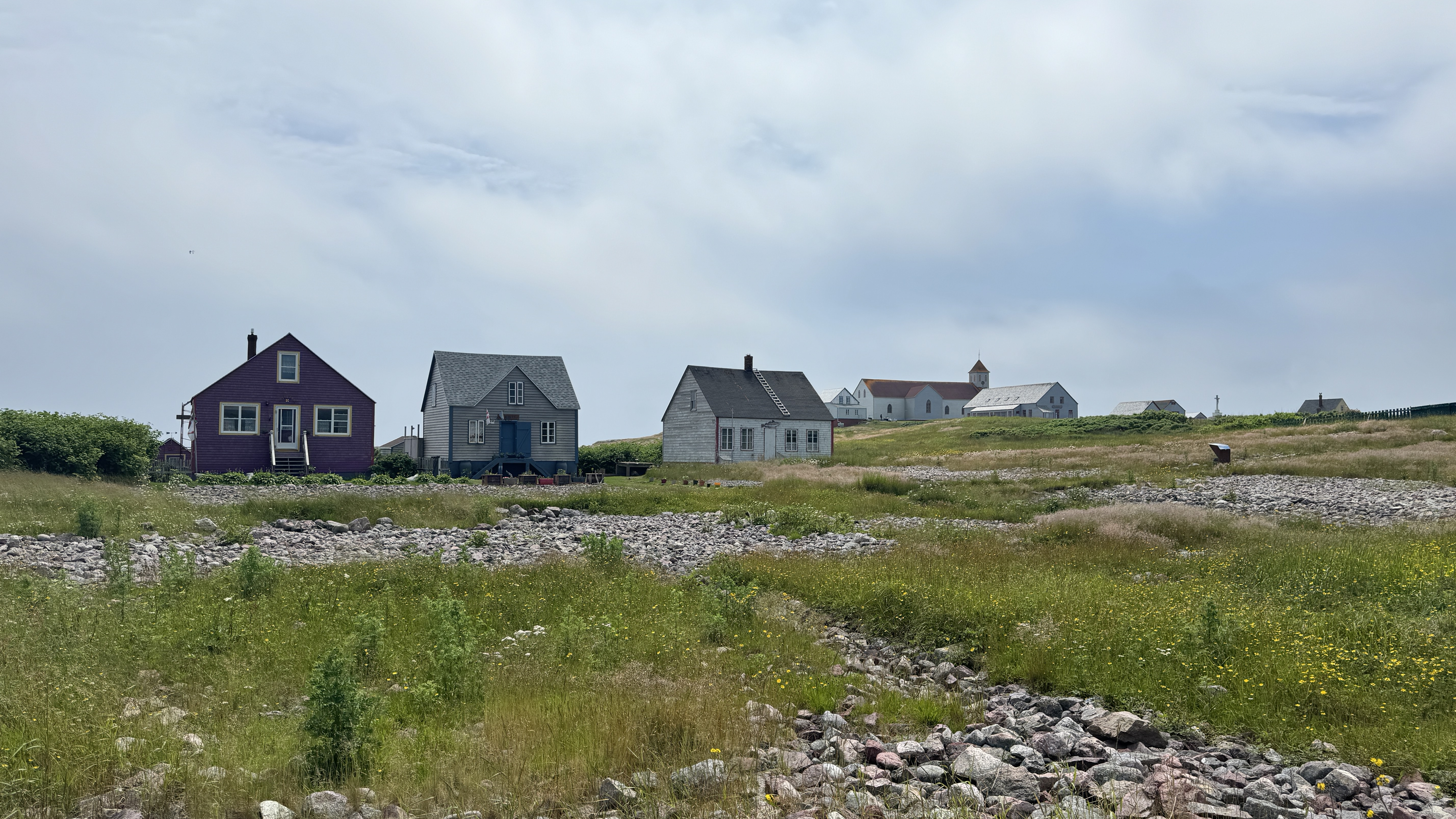
Houses

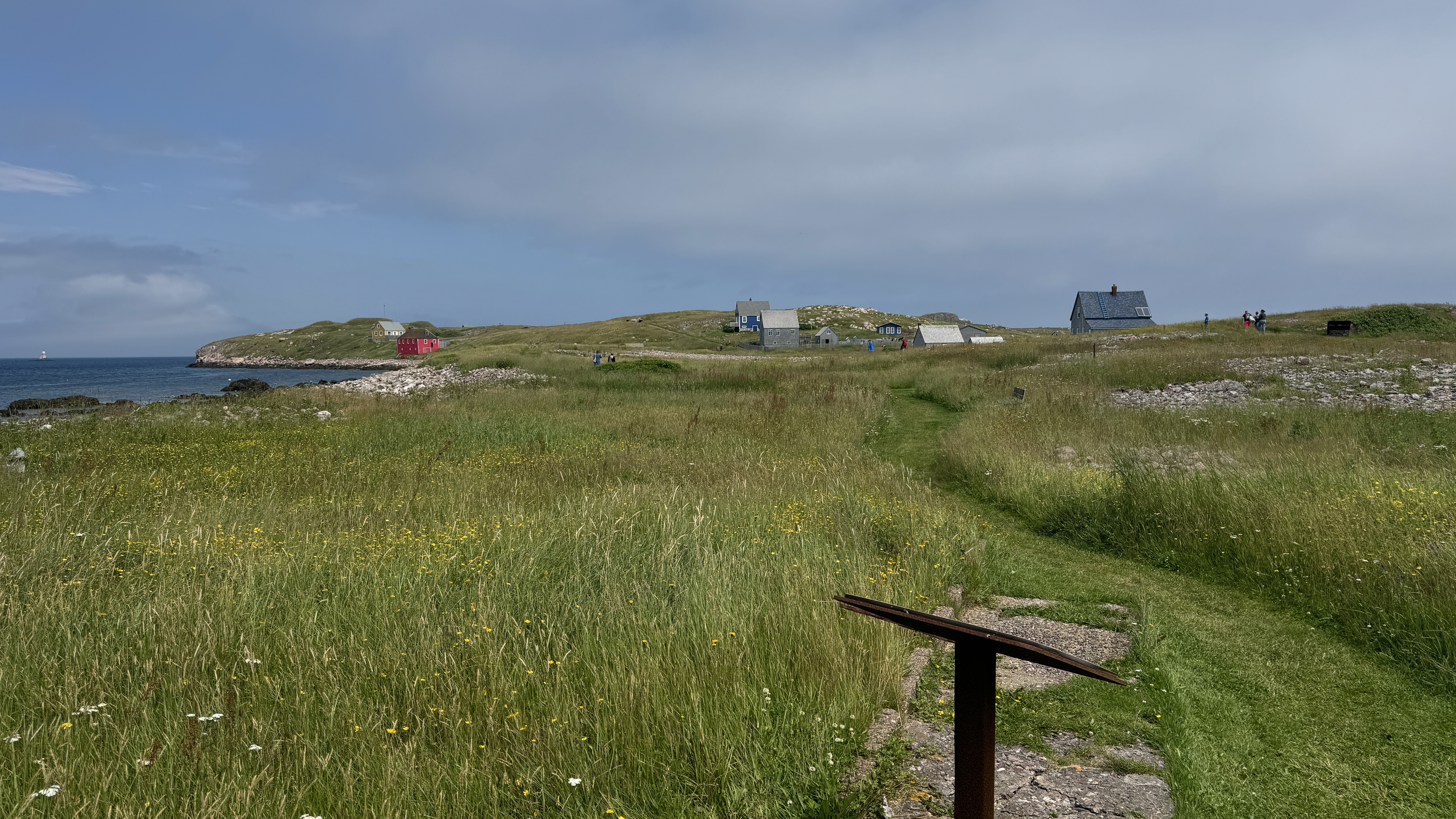
House

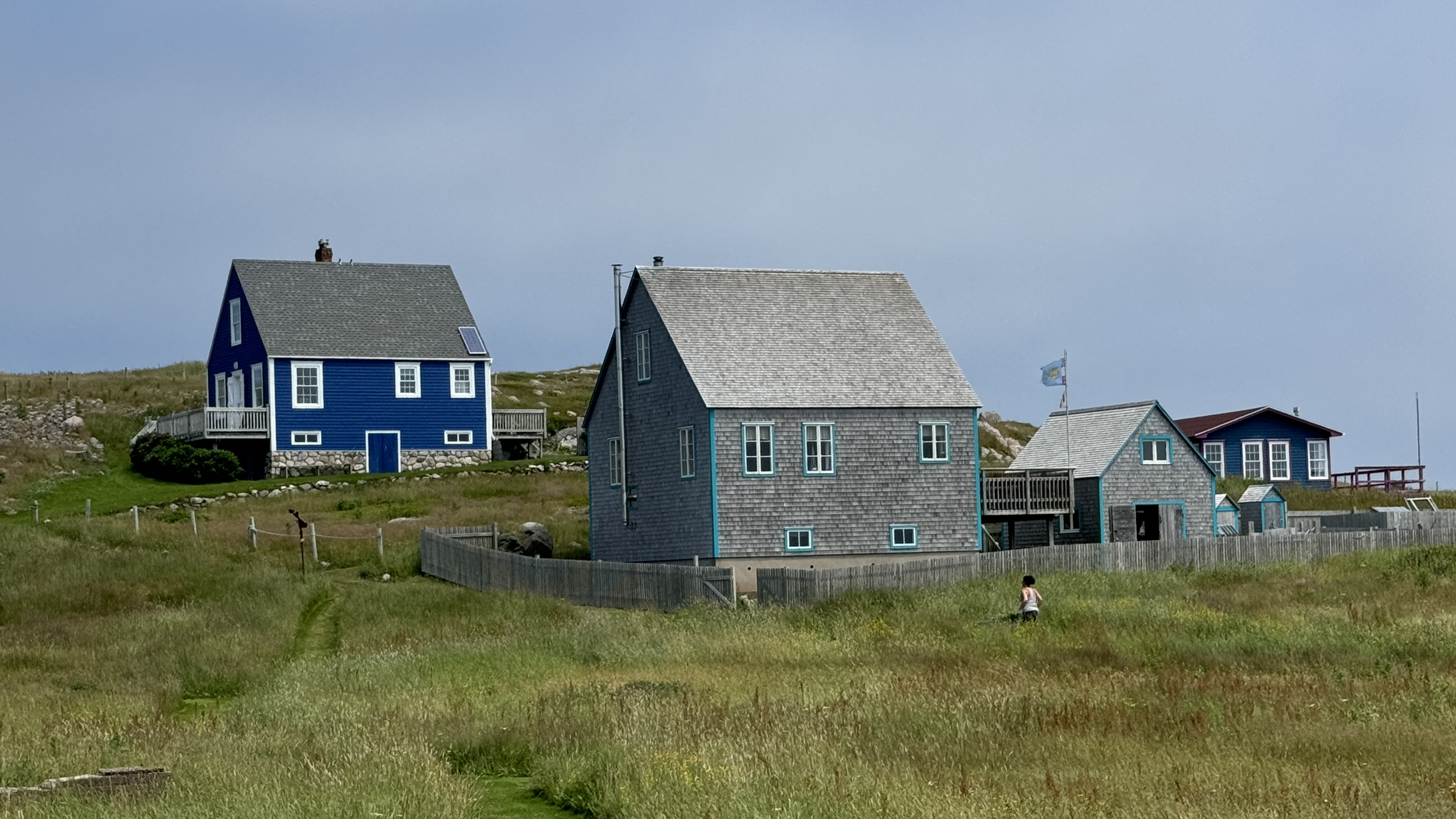
Houses

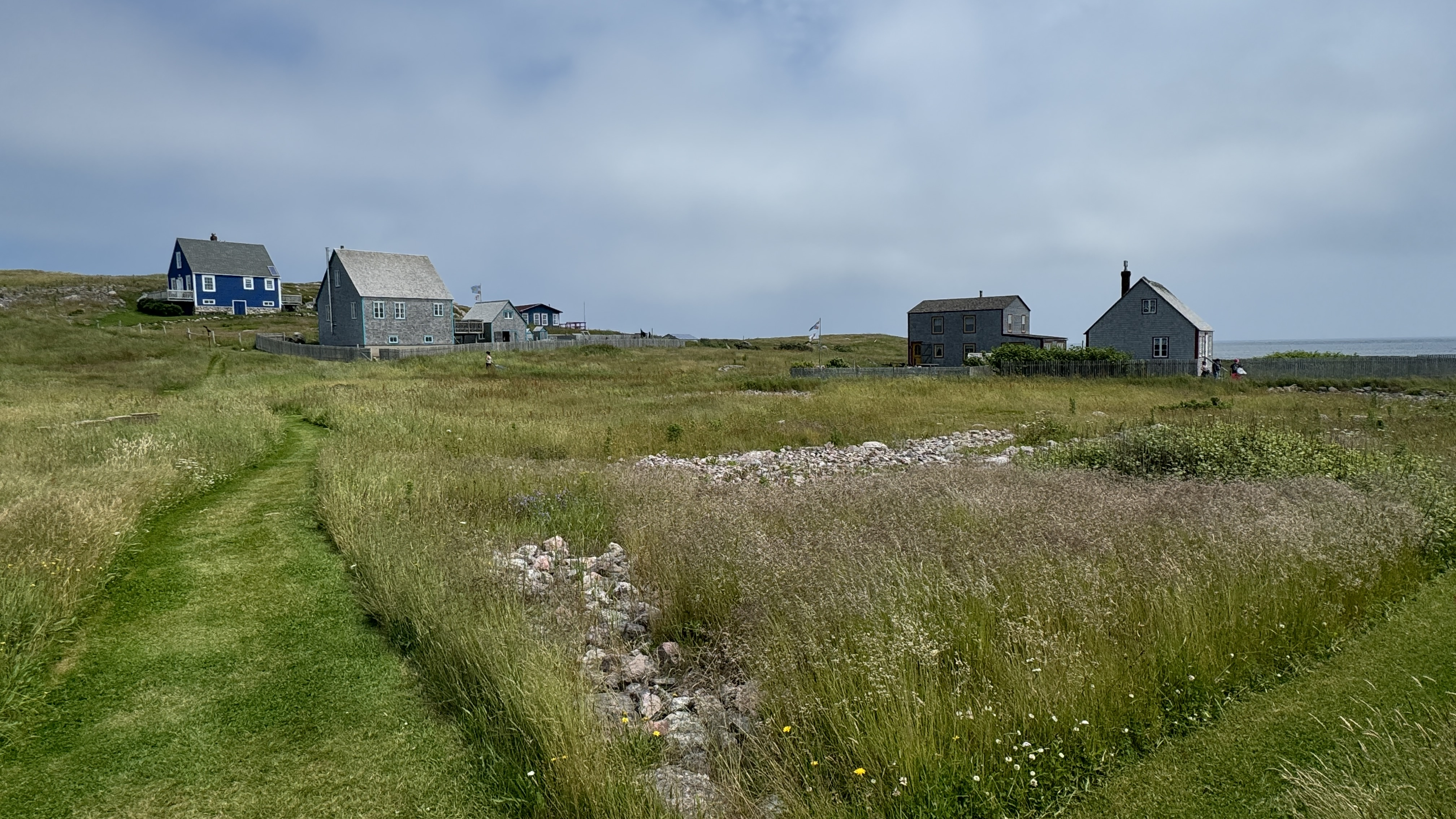
View from south to ferry terminal

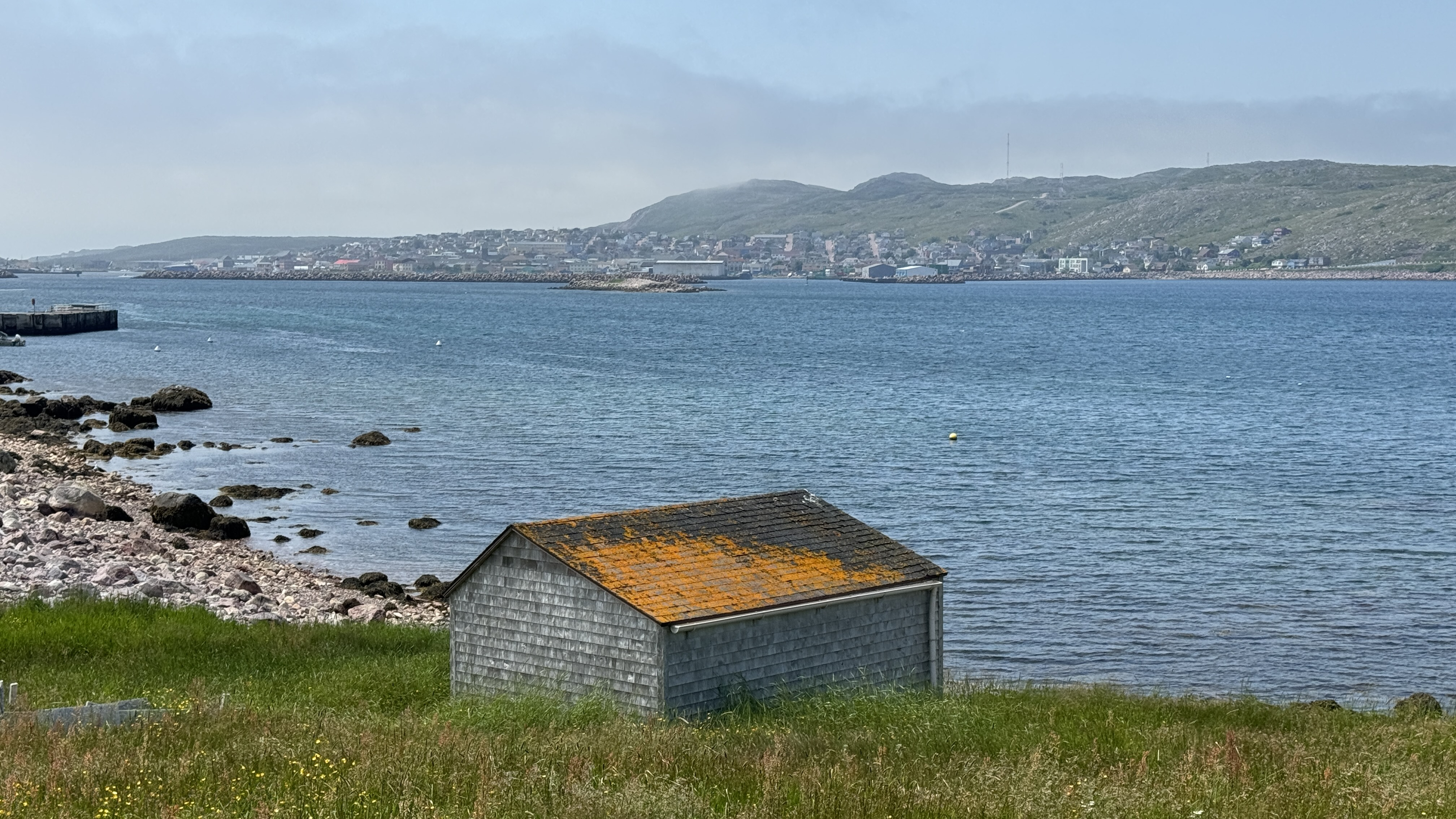
House

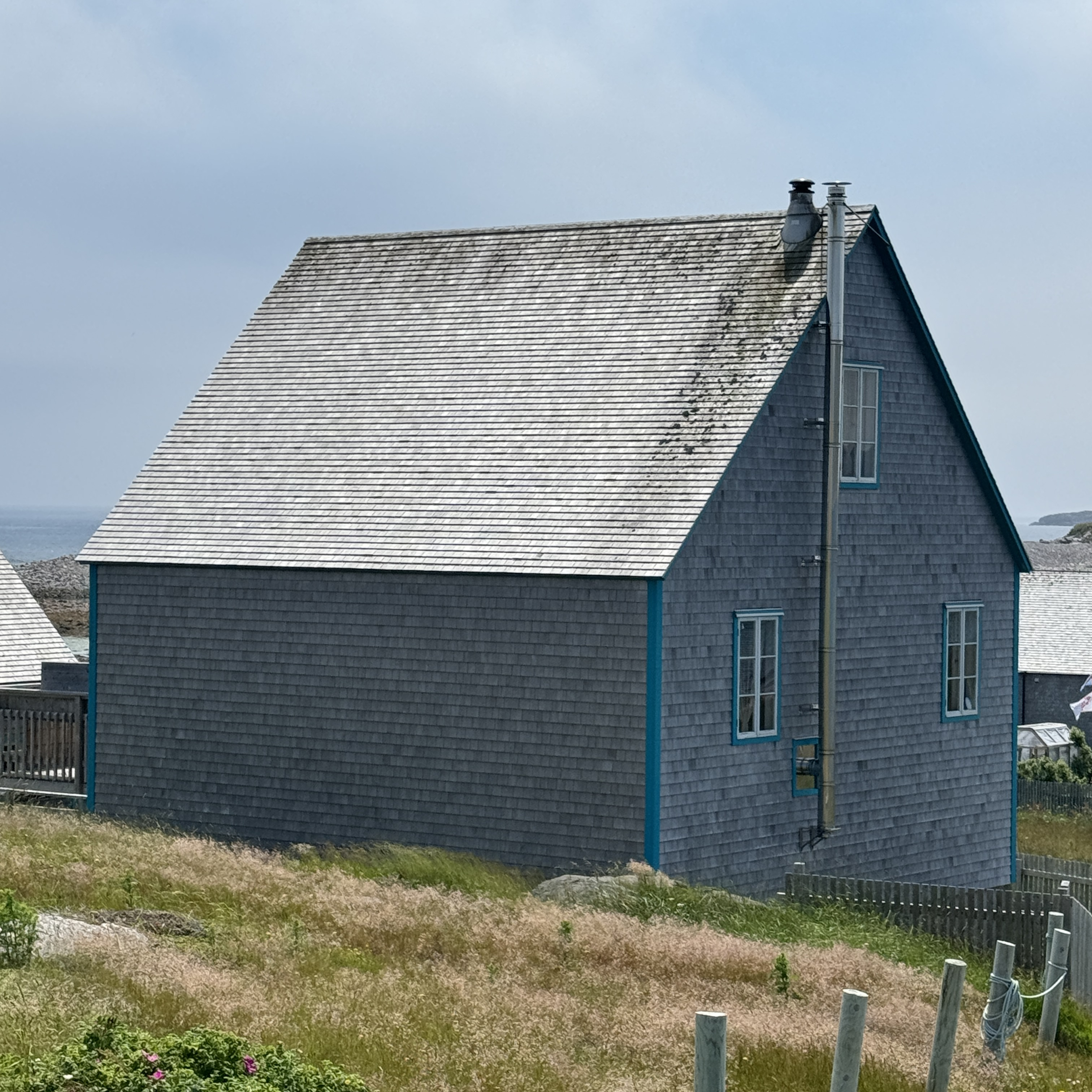
House

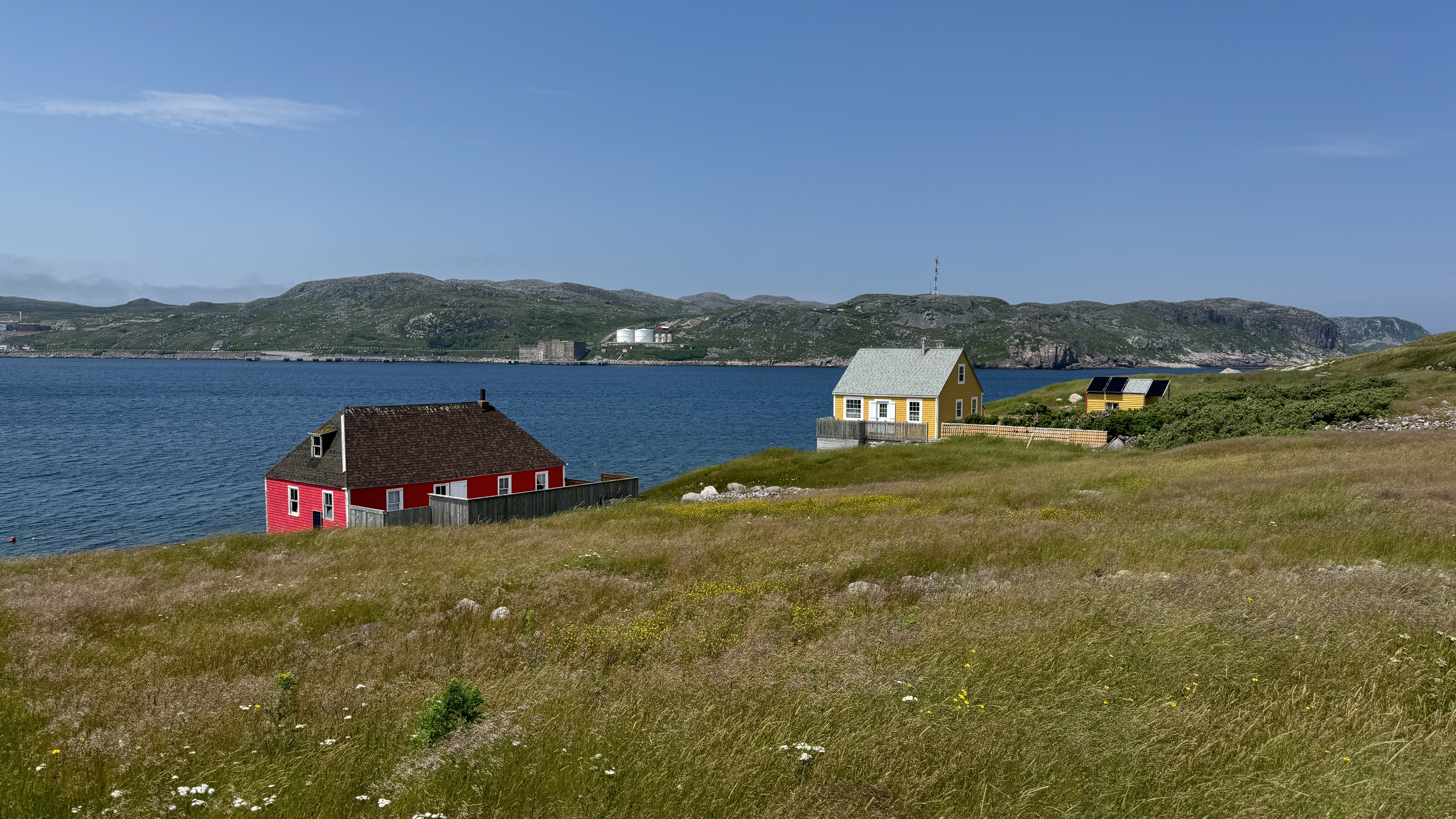
Houses

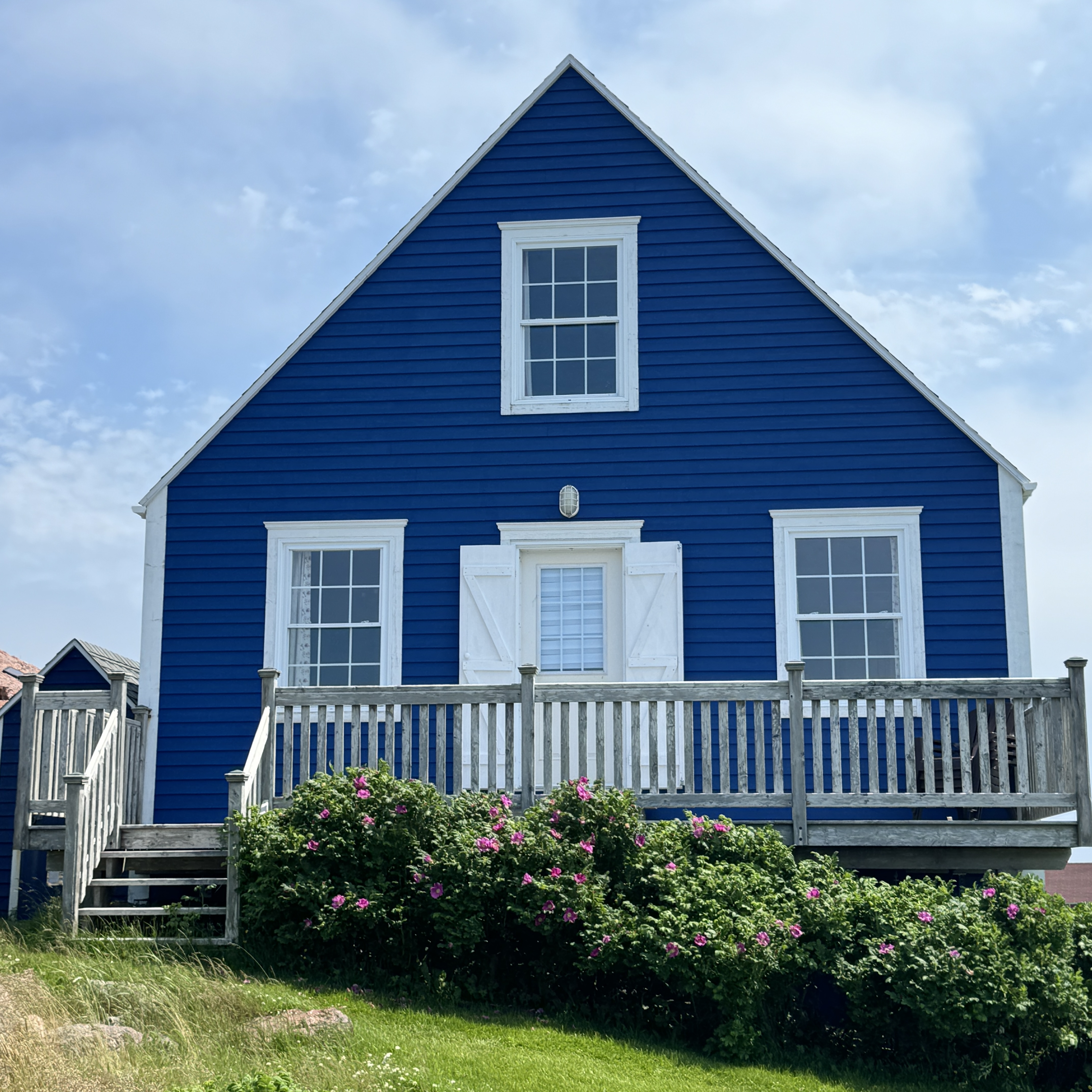
House

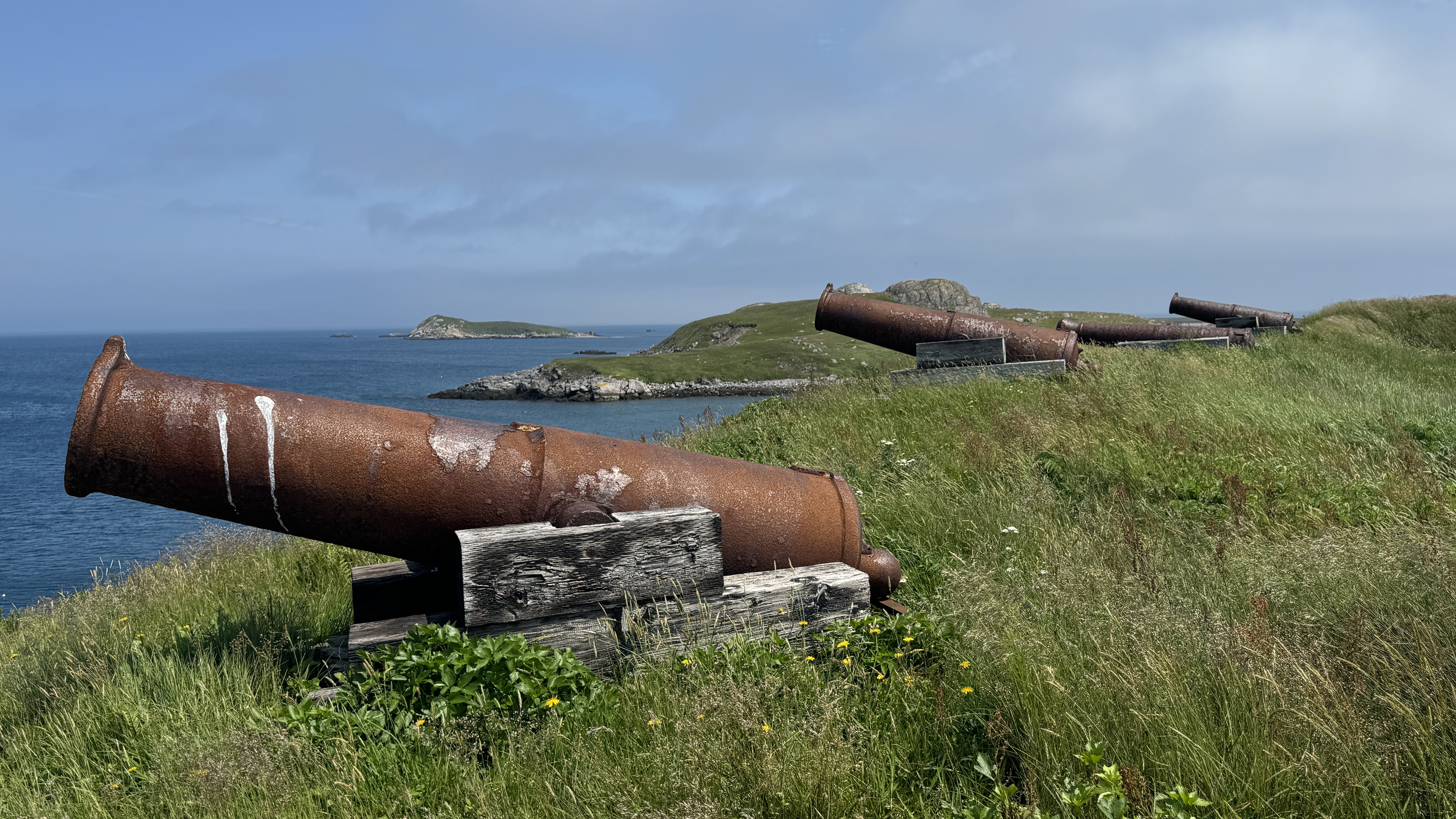
Cannons at fort

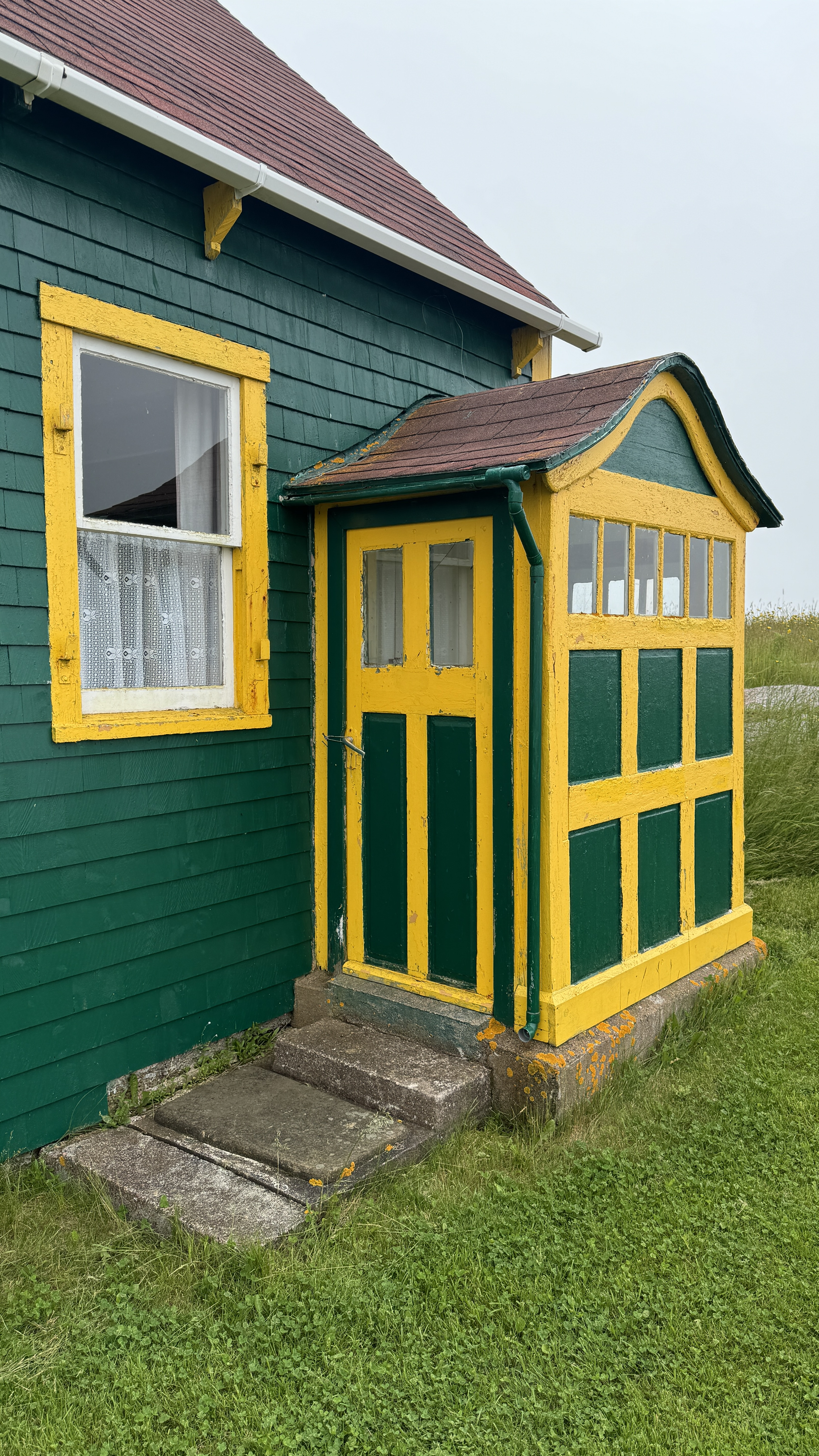
Tambour

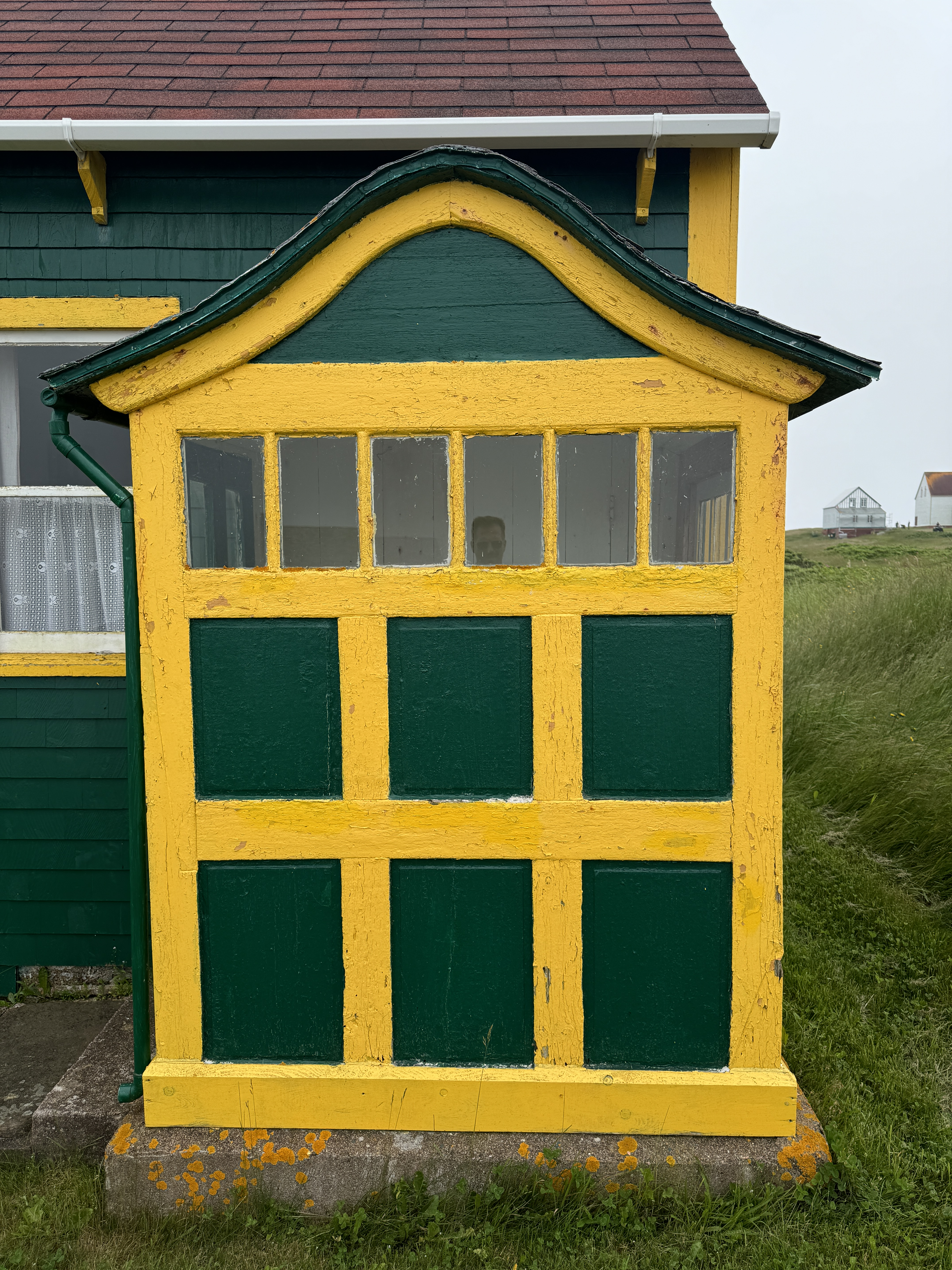
Tambour

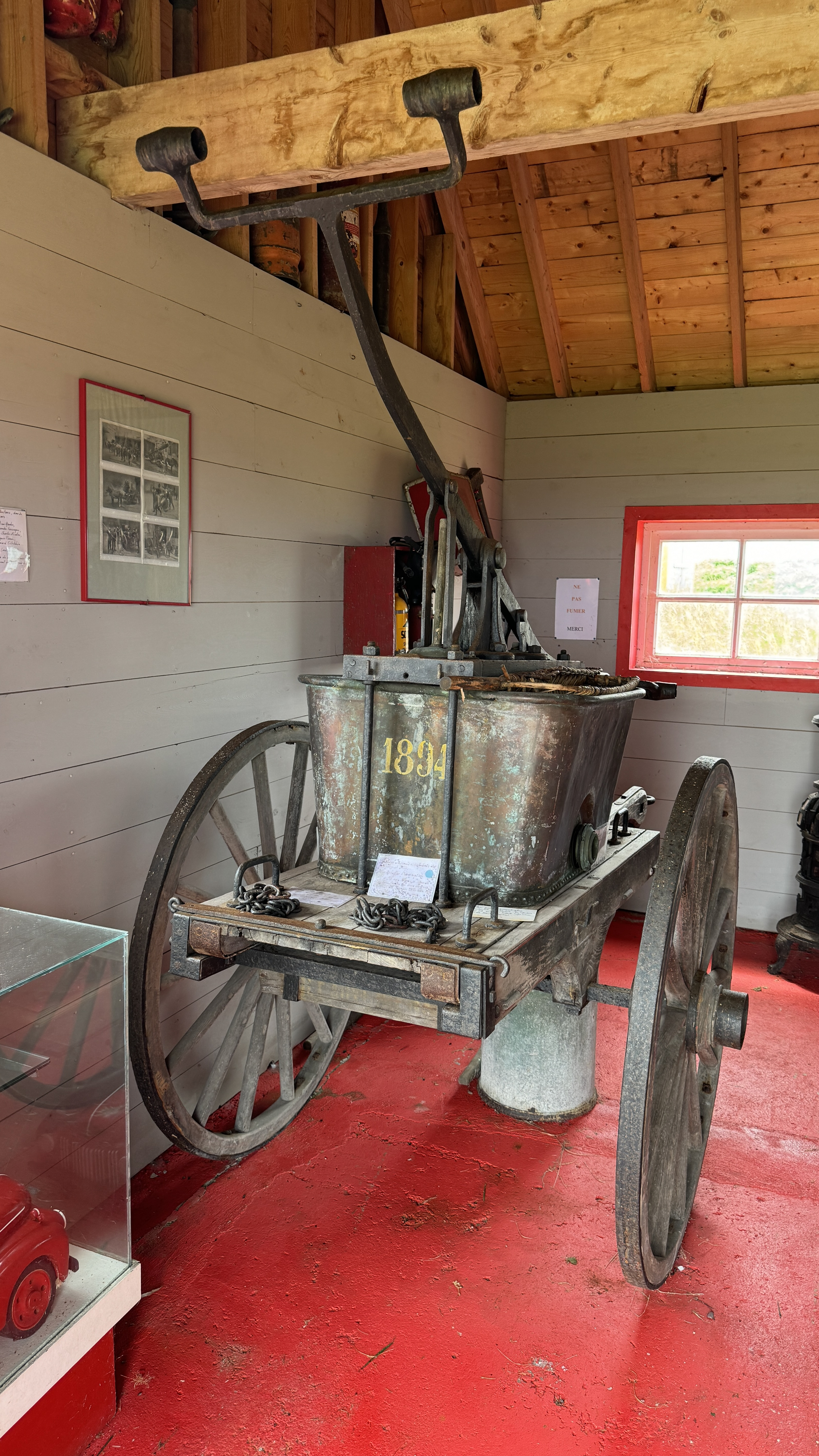
Fire wagon

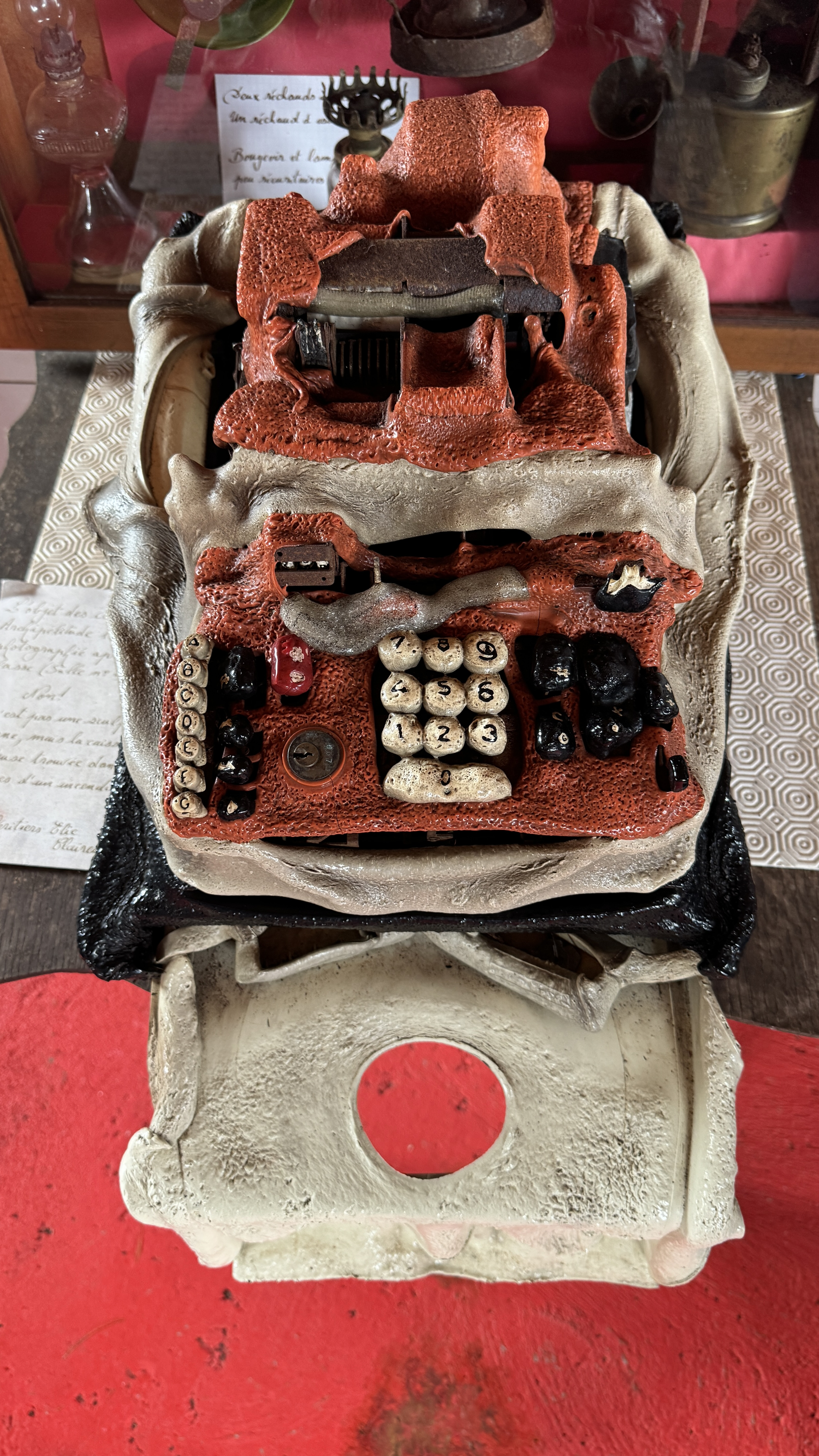
Fire damage

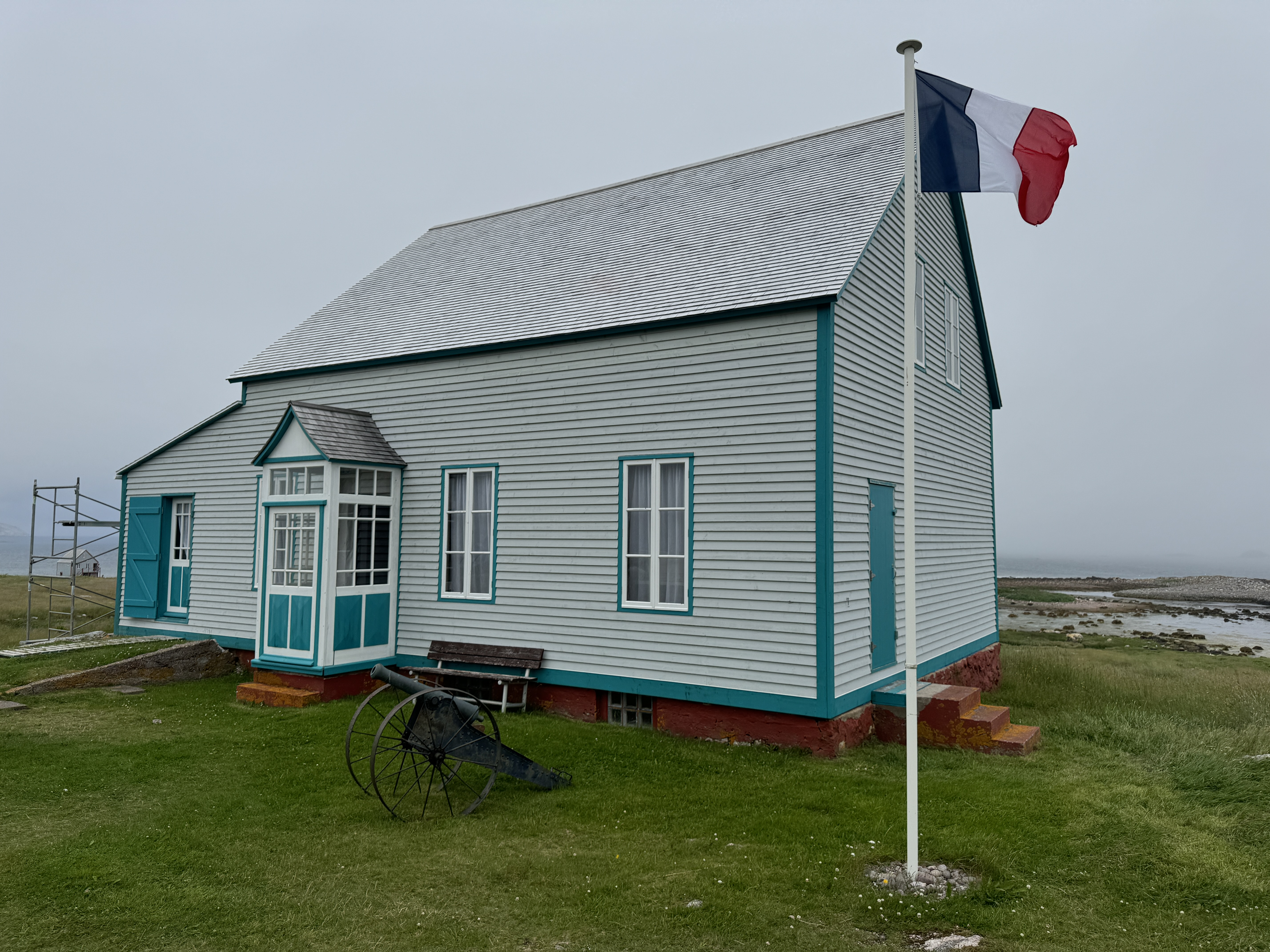
House

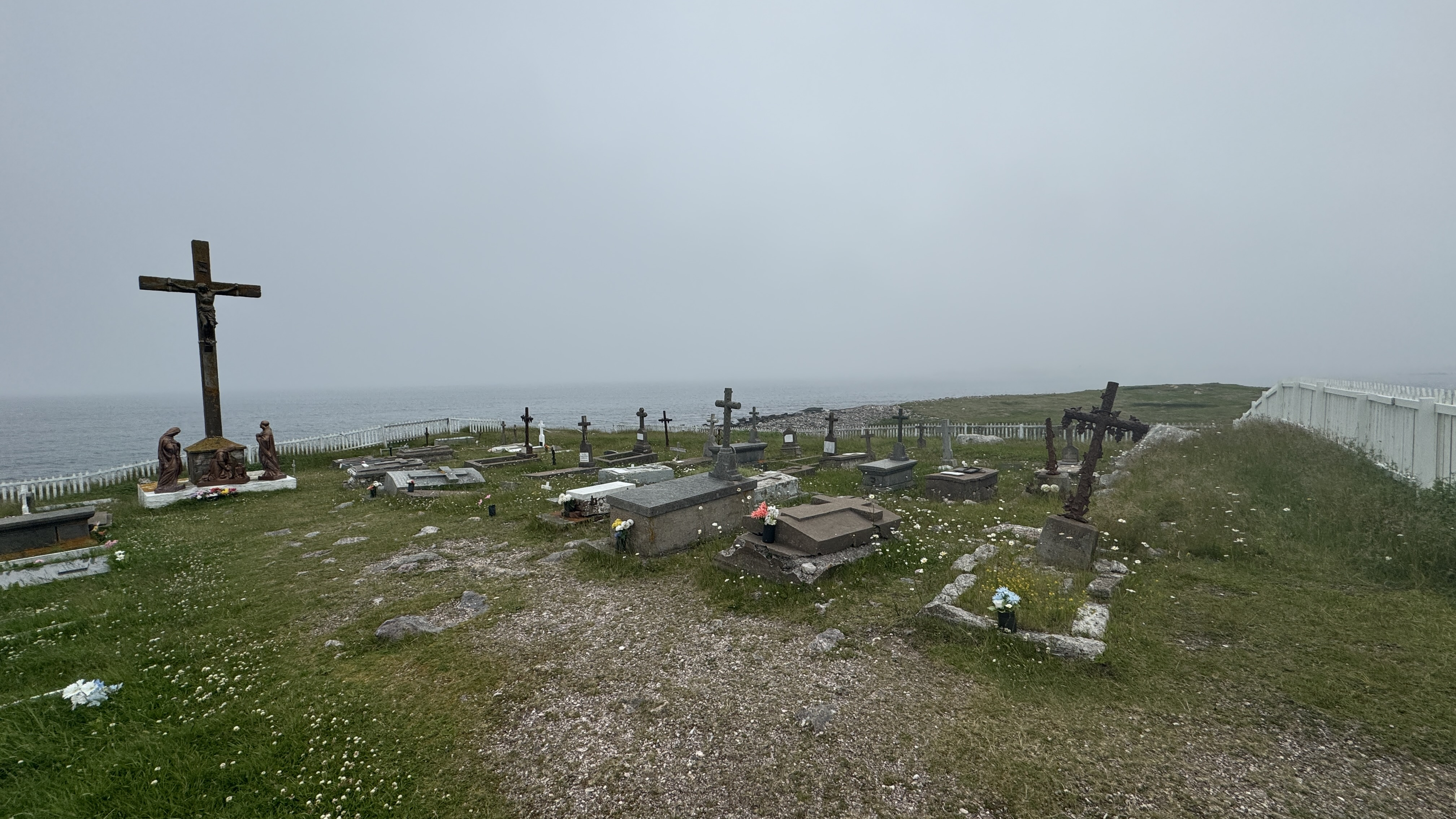
Graveyard

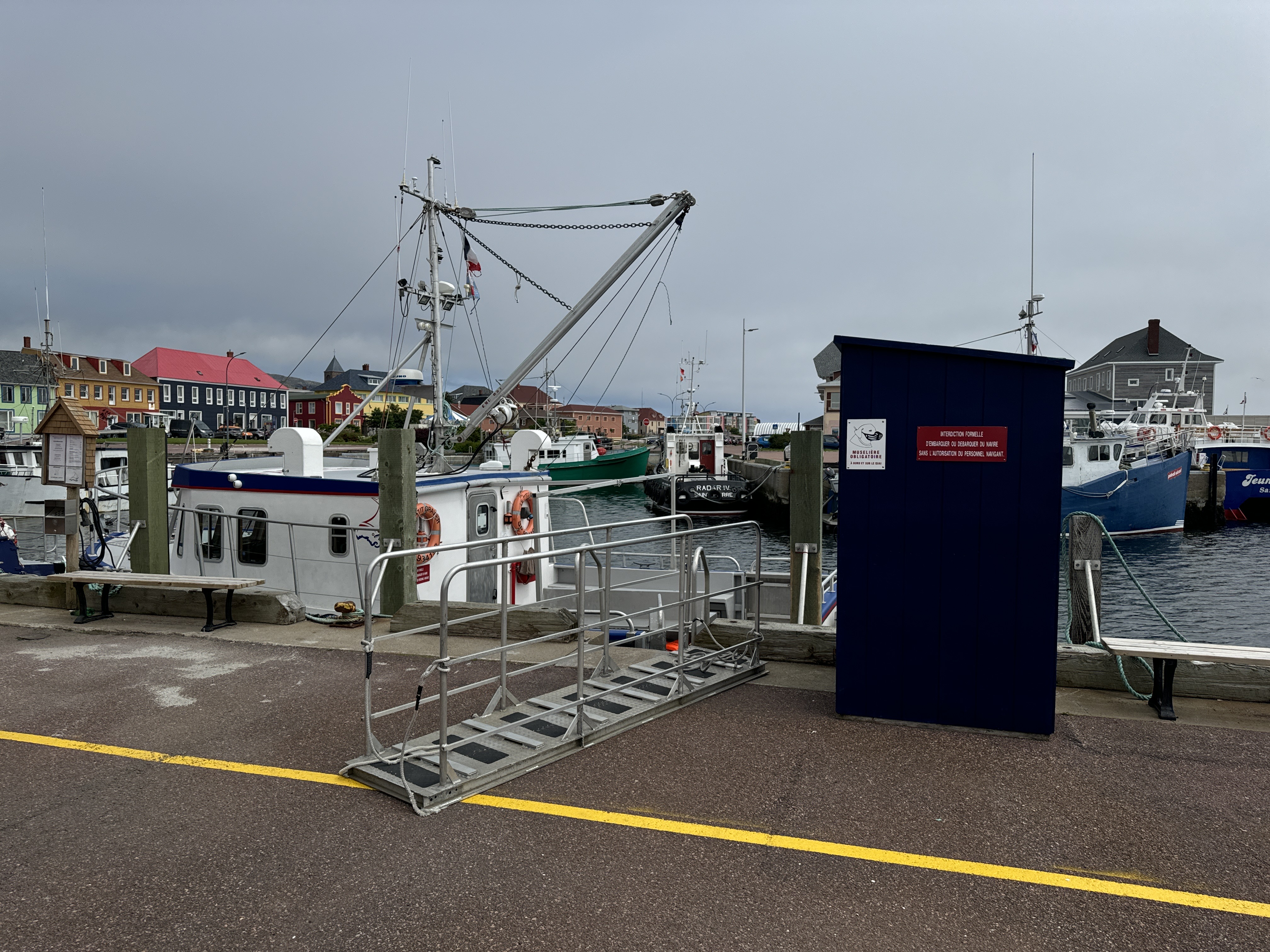
Ferry to Île aux Marins in Saint-Pierre

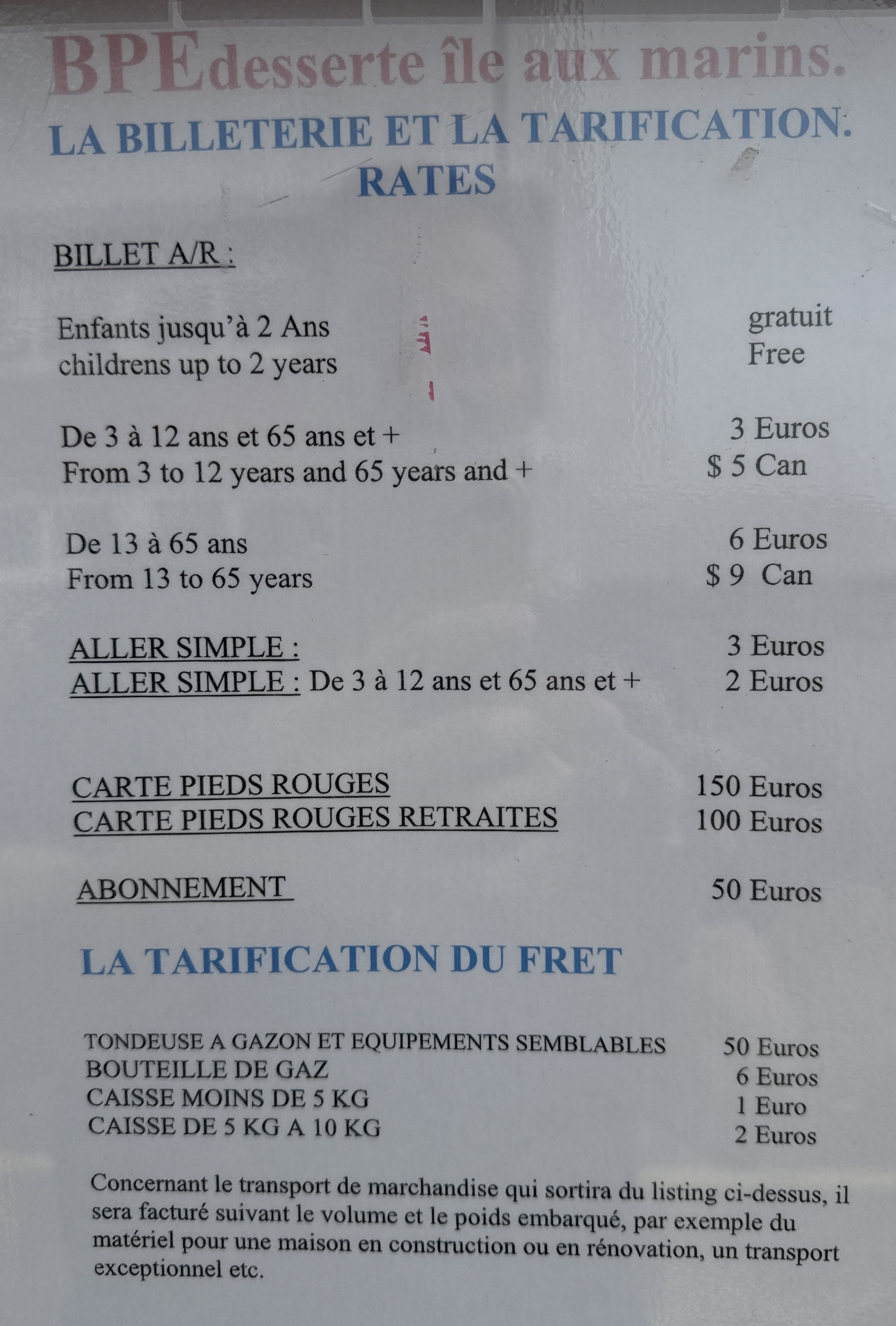
Ferry prices

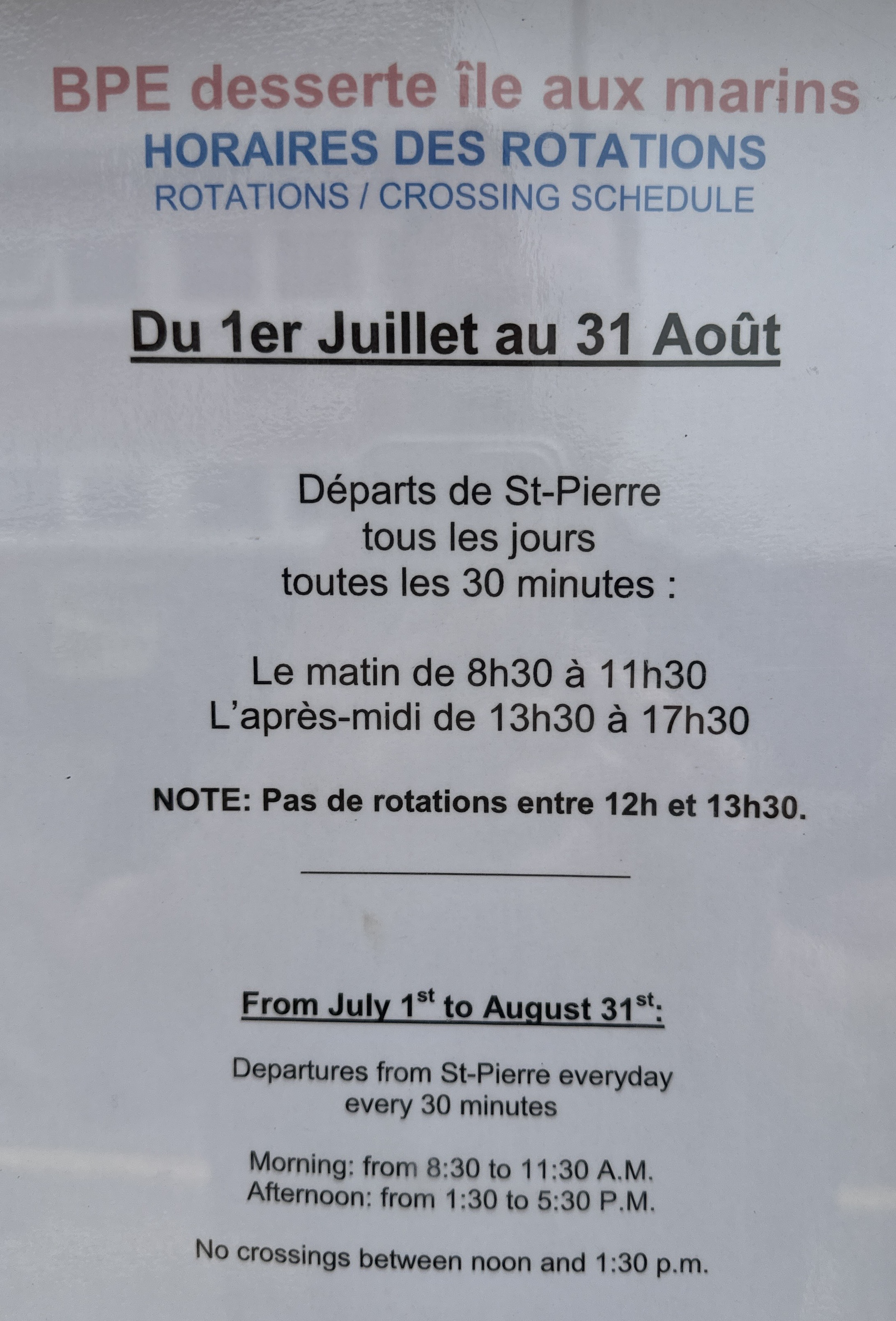
Ferry schedule
