= Transpacific (ships) =

Transpacific may refer to:

- Transpacific, launched in 1954, grounded on L'Île-aux-Marins near the French Islands of Saint Pierre and Miquelon in the Gulf of St. Lawrence on May 18, 1971, where she remains to this day.
- MT Transpacific, transported over 25,000 55-gallon drums of Agent Orange between South Vietnam and Johnston Atoll in the Summer of 1972 during Operation Pacer IVY.
- MV Transpacific (T-1), launched in 2001, is a petroleum Tanker that serves TransAtlantic Lines LLC between Japan, Okinawa, Marshall Islands, and Korea.
