= Île aux Pigeons =

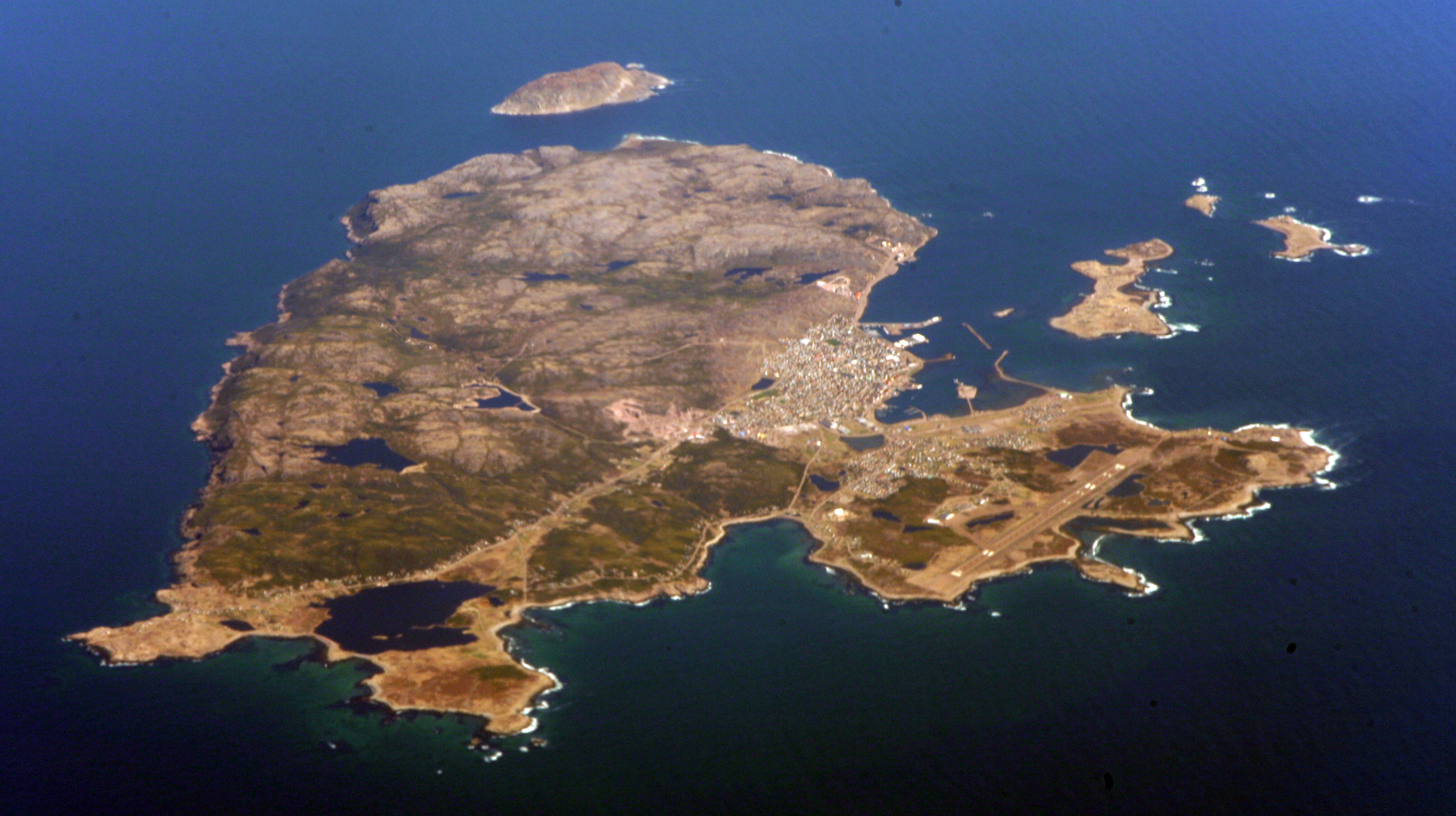
- Saint-Pierre and Miquelon aerial photo, 2013. Île aux Pigeons is at the top right.
- Interactive map of Île aux Pigeons

Geography
- Coordinates: 46°47′47″N 56°08′01″W
- Area: 0.3 km^{2} (0.12 sq mi)
- Highest elevation: 20 m (70 ft)

Administration
- Saint Pierre and Miquelon

Île aux Pigeons (French: Pigeon Island; formerly called Île Canaille) is a small uninhabited island located about 2 kilometres (1.2 mi) off the coast of Saint-Pierre and Miquelon, a self-governing territorial overseas collectivity of France and the last remaining part of New France in North America.

Île aux Pigeons is covered with short grass and is shaped roughly like a diamond with a rocky coast. The island is slightly sloping with a maximum height of 20 metres (66 ft) with its greatest lengths measuring about 300 metres (980 ft) by 250 metres (820 ft), on its north–south and west–east axes, respectively.

Maps from the 17th century show the island as having been named Isle Canaille or Isle de Canaille. Its current name appears by the end of the 18th century. The island is uninhabited, but Edgar Aubert de la Rüe wrote that a farm may have existed once on site.
