= Electoral history of Michael Bloomberg =

Elections featuring American politician

This is the electoral history of Michael Bloomberg, American billionaire businessman and the 108th Mayor of New York City, in office from 2002 to 2013. He was a late entry to the 2020 Democratic Party presidential primaries, competing only in Super Tuesday and ending his campaign the morning after.

== New York City mayoral elections ==
=== 2001 ===
Republican primary for the 2001 New York City mayoral election
Party	Candidate	Votes	%
Republican	Michael Bloomberg	48,055	65.86%
Republican	Herman Badillo	18,476	25.32%
Write-in		6,430	8.81%
Total votes		72,961	100%

2001 New York City mayoral election
Party	Candidate	Votes	%
Republican	Michael Bloomberg	685,666	46.30%
Independence	Michael Bloomberg	59,901	4.04%
Total	Michael Bloomberg	744,757	50.29%
Democratic	Mark Green	676,717	45.70%
Working Families	Mark Green	32,551	2.20%
Total	Mark Green	709,268	47.89%
Liberal	Alan Hevesi	8,027	0.54%
Better Schools	Alan Hevesi	2,304	0.16%
Total	Alan Hevesi	10,331	0.70%
Green	Julia Willebrand	7,155	0.48%
Conservative	Terrence Gray	3,577	0.24%
Marijuana Reform	Thomas K. Leighton	2,563	0.17%
Libertarian	Kenny Kramer	1,408	0.10%
City Fusion	Bernhard Goetz	1,049	0.07%
American Dream	Ken Golding	474	0.03%
Write-in		332	0.02%
Total votes		1,480,914	100%
Republican hold			

=== 2005 ===
Democratic primary for the 2005 New York City mayoral election
Party	Candidate	Votes	%
Democratic	Fernando Ferrer	192,262	40.15%
Democratic	Anthony Weiner	138,917	29.01%
Democratic	C. Virginia Fields	75,826	15.84%
Democratic	Gifford Miller	49,515	10.34%
Democratic	Christopher X. Brodeur	16,561	3.46%
Democratic	Arthur Piccolo	5,584	1.17%
Democratic	Michael Bloomberg (incumbent) (write-in)	121	0.03%
Write-in		32	0.01%
Total votes		478,818	100.00

2005 New York City mayoral election
Party	Candidate	Votes	%
Republican	Michael Bloomberg (incumbent)	678,444	52.60%
Independence	Michael Bloomberg (incumbent)	74,645	5.79%
Total	Michael Bloomberg (incumbent)	753,089	58.38%
Democratic	Fernando Ferrer	503,219	39.01%
Conservative	Thomas Ognibene	14,630	1.13%
Green	Anthony Gronowicz	8,297	0.64%
Rent Is Too Damn High	Jimmy McMillan	4,111	0.32%
Libertarian	Audrey Silk	2,888	0.22%
Socialist Workers	Martin Koppel	2,256	0.18%
Education	Seth Blum	1,176	0.09%
Write-in		269	0.02%
Total votes		1,289,935	100%
Republican hold			

=== 2009 ===
Independence Party primary for the 2009 New York City mayoral election
Party	Candidate	Votes	%
Independence	Michael Bloomberg (incumbent)	93	93.00%
Independence	None of the Above	7	7.00%
Total votes		100	100%

Democratic primary for the 2009 New York City mayoral election
Party	Candidate	Votes	%
Democratic	Bill Thompson	234,897	71.04%
Democratic	Tony Avella	69,774	21.10%
Democratic	Michael Bloomberg (incumbent) (write-in)	183	0.06%
Write-in		214	0.07%
Total votes		330,659	100.00

2009 New York City mayoral election
Party	Candidate	Votes	%
Republican	Michael Bloomberg (incumbent)	435,393	36.96%
Independence	Michael Bloomberg (incumbent)	150,073	12.74%
Total	Michael Bloomberg (incumbent)	585,466	50.70%
Democratic	Bill Thompson	506,995	43.04%
Working Families	Bill Thompson	27,874	2.37%
Total	Bill Thompson	534,869	46.32%
Conservative	Stephen A. Christopher	18,013	1.56%
Green	Billy Talen	8,902	0.77%
Rent Is Too Damn High	Jimmy McMillan	2,332	0.20%
Socialism and Liberation	Frances Villar	1,996	0.17%
Libertarian	Joseph Dobrian	1,616	0.14%
Socialist Workers	Daniel B. Fein	1,311	0.11%
Write-in		297	0.03%
Total votes		1,178,057	100%
Independent hold			

== 2020 Democratic party presidential primaries ==
2020 Alabama Democratic presidential primary

Popular vote share by county Biden—40–50% Biden—50–60% Biden—60–70% Biden—70–80%

2020 Alabama Democratic presidential primary
Candidate	Votes	%	Delegates
Joe Biden	286,065	63.28	44
Bernie Sanders	74,755	16.54	8
Michael Bloomberg	52,750	11.67	
Elizabeth Warren	25,847	5.72	
Michael Bennet (withdrawn) (Note: Candidate withdrew after the New Hampshire primary when absentee voting had already begun.)	2,250	0.50	
Pete Buttigieg (withdrawn) (Note: Candidate withdrew shortly before the primary when absentee voting had already begun.)	1,416	0.31	
Tom Steyer (withdrawn)	1,048	0.23	
Tulsi Gabbard	1,038	0.23	
Amy Klobuchar (withdrawn)	907	0.20	
Andrew Yang (withdrawn)	875	0.19	
Cory Booker (withdrawn) (Note: Candidate withdrew during the first days of the absentee voting period.)	740	0.16	
John Delaney (withdrawn)	294	0.07	
Marianne Williamson (withdrawn)	224	0.05	
Julian Castro (withdrawn)	184	0.04	
Uncommitted	3,700	0.82	
Total	452,093	100%	52

=== Results by county ===
2020 Alabama Democratic primary (results by county)
County	Biden		Sanders		Bloomberg		Warren		Others		Uncommitted		Total votes
County	Votes	%	Votes	%	Votes	%	Votes	%	Votes	%	Votes	%	Total votes
Autauga	2,239	63.03	604	17.00	427	12.02	193	5.43	68	1.91	21	0.59	3,552
Baldwin	7,321	58.24	2,475	19.69	1,516	12.06	892	7.10	282	2.24	84	0.67	12,570
Barbour	1,899	74.97	202	7.97	287	11.33	57	2.25	71	2.80	17	0.67	2,533
Bibb	559	56.18	138	13.87	243	24.42	34	3.42	15	1.51	6	0.60	995
Blount	654	50.86	336	26.13	147	11.43	91	7.08	35	2.72	23	1.79	1,286
Bullock	1,569	70.20	149	6.67	356	15.93	44	1.97	85	3.80	32	1.43	2,235
Butler	1,451	65.92	171	7.77	507	23.03	28	1.27	32	1.45	12	0.55	2,201
Calhoun	4,855	61.42	1,506	19.05	881	11.14	457	5.78	163	2.06	43	0.54	7,905
Chambers	1,835	65.19	285	10.12	569	20.21	61	2.17	53	1.88	12	0.43	2,815
Cherokee	455	53.85	163	19.29	147	17.40	42	4.97	24	2.84	14	1.66	845
Chilton	856	62.25	231	16.80	168	12.22	63	4.58	40	2.91	17	1.24	1,375
Choctaw	1,351	59.33	216	9.49	440	19.32	30	1.32	104	4.57	136	5.97	2,277
Clarke	1,968	59.93	258	7.86	932	28.38	43	1.31	63	1.92	20	0.61	3,284
Clay	486	67.03	74	10.21	94	12.97	27	3.72	30	4.14	14	1.93	725
Cleburne	219	60.16	60	16.48	43	11.81	25	6.87	11	3.02	6	1.65	364
Coffee	1,597	63.80	433	17.30	276	11.03	118	4.71	55	2.20	24	0.96	2,503
Colbert	2,996	63.58	783	16.62	603	12.80	181	3.84	98	2.08	51	1.08	4,712
Conecuh	1,214	48.85	254	10.22	704	28.33	52	2.09	149	6.00	112	4.51	2,485
Coosa	574	65.98	99	11.38	156	17.93	21	2.41	14	1.61	6	0.69	870
Covington	856	66.36	184	14.26	166	12.87	45	3.49	30	2.33	9	0.70	1,290
Crenshaw	554	62.81	70	7.94	221	25.06	17	1.93	14	1.59	6	0.68	882
Cullman	1,262	49.86	633	25.01	317	12.52	173	6.84	82	3.24	64	2.53	2,531
Dale	1,656	68.57	401	16.60	203	8.41	86	3.56	50	2.07	19	0.79	2,415
Dallas	6,236	66.90	897	9.62	1,070	11.48	237	2.54	371	3.98	510	5.47	9,321
DeKalb	1,193	53.62	571	25.66	267	12.00	114	5.12	54	2.43	26	1.17	2,225
Elmore	3,089	64.77	737	15.45	591	12.39	259	5.43	66	1.38	27	0.57	4,769
Escambia	1,462	68.74	218	10.25	341	16.03	48	2.26	43	2.02	15	0.71	2,127
Etowah	3,749	62.14	1,048	17.37	808	13.39	258	4.28	114	1.89	56	0.93	6,033
Fayette	401	51.15	98	12.50	217	27.68	39	4.97	24	3.06	5	0.64	784
Franklin	633	57.49	222	20.16	155	14.08	38	3.45	31	2.82	22	2.00	1,101
Geneva	511	62.62	107	13.11	138	16.91	32	3.92	21	2.57	7	0.86	816
Greene	1,782	72.38	191	7.76	406	16.49	21	0.85	53	2.15	9	0.37	2,462
Hale	1,327	51.67	175	6.81	950	36.99	44	1.71	54	2.10	18	0.70	2,568
Henry	1,020	74.83	167	12.25	108	7.92	22	1.61	37	2.71	9	0.66	1,363
Houston	3,912	69.23	928	16.42	432	7.64	238	4.21	104	1.84	37	0.65	5,651
Jackson	1,039	55.56	403	21.55	267	14.28	89	4.76	49	2.62	23	1.23	1,870
Jefferson	67,575	66.44	16,149	15.88	8,729	8.58	7,311	7.19	1,529	1.50	411	0.40	101,704
Lamar	324	61.48	55	10.44	117	22.20	11	2.09	16	3.04	4	0.76	527
Lauderdale	3,568	54.83	1,547	23.77	740	11.37	470	7.22	136	2.09	46	0.71	6,507
Lawrence	1,355	65.59	256	12.39	343	16.60	68	3.29	33	1.60	11	0.53	2,066
Lee	7,369	58.81	2,609	20.82	1,070	8.54	1,218	9.72	222	1.77	43	0.34	12,531
Limestone	4,127	60.89	1,411	20.82	701	10.34	400	5.90	103	1.52	36	0.53	6,778
Lowndes	2,406	69.74%	386	11.19	433	12.55	54	1.57	120	3.48	51	1.48	3,450
Macon	3,067	67.45	481	10.58	654	14.38	166	3.65	121	2.66	58	1.28	4,547
Madison	25,916	57.54	10,487	23.28	4,113	9.13	3,622	8.04	720	1.60	181	0.40	45,039
Marengo	2,120	62.12	241	7.06	882	25.84	52	1.52	90	2.64	28	0.82	3,413
Marion	398	56.86	134	19.14	104	14.86	35	5.00	12	1.71	17	2.43	700
Marshall	1,581	52.52	777	25.81	364	12.09	190	6.31	82	2.72	16	0.53	3,010
Mobile	26,923	66.73	6,612	16.39	4,277	10.60	1,585	3.93	744	1.84	207	0.51	40,348
Monroe	1,716	69.87	205	8.35	405	16.49	38	1.55	70	2.85	22	0.90	2,456
Montgomery	23,465	67.94	4,502	13.04	4,178	12.10	1,484	4.30	629	1.82	278	0.80	34,536
Morgan	3,954	59.56	1,250	18.83	917	13.81	339	5.11	133	2.00	46	0.69	6,639
Perry	2,094	74.97	178	6.37	296	10.60	69	2.47	92	3.29	64	2.29	2,793
Pickens	1,142	52.77	196	9.06	752	34.75	29	1.34	41	1.89	4	0.18	2,164
Pike	1,786	68.32	433	16.56	219	8.38	105	4.02	57	2.18	14	0.54	2,614
Randolph	522	49.86	122	11.65	326	31.14	28	2.67	37	3.53	12	1.15	1,047
Russell	3,221	69.75	566	12.26	634	13.73	111	2.40	64	1.39	22	0.48	4,618
Shelby	9,543	56.87	3,795	22.62	1,415	8.43	1,672	9.96	283	1.69	71	0.42	16,779
St. Clair	2,268	57.40	835	21.13	457	11.57	283	7.16	83	2.10	25	0.63	3,951
Sumter	2,012	61.19	289	8.79	706	21.47	57	1.73	120	3.65	104	3.16%	3,288
Talladega	4,617	69.12	803	12.02	917	13.73	197	2.95	127	1.90	19	0.28%	6,680
Tallapoosa	1,762	65.70	302	11.26	438	16.33	83	3.09	84	3.13	13	0.48	2,682
Tuscaloosa	11,825	60.26	3,552	18.10	2,175	11.08	1,684	8.58	303	1.54	84	0.43	19,623
Walker	1,390	57.44	538	22.23	260	10.74	136	5.62	66	2.73	30	1.24	2,420
Washington	1,109	60.17	156	8.46	246	13.35	37	2.01	98	5.32	197	10.69	1,843
Wilcox	1,864	60.28	284	9.18	654	21.15	62	2.01	159	5.14	69	2.23%	3,092
Winston	266	52.36	117	23.03	75	14.76	32	6.30	13	2.56	5	0.98	508
Total	286,065	63.28	74,755	16.54	52,750	11.67	25,847	5.72	8,976	1.99	3,700	0.82	452,093

2020 American Samoa presidential caucuses

2020 American Samoa Democratic presidential caucus
Candidate	Votes	%	Delegates
Michael Bloomberg	175	49.86	4
Tulsi Gabbard	103	29.34	2
Bernie Sanders	37	10.54	
Joe Biden	31	8.83	
Elizabeth Warren	5	1.42	
Uncommitted	0	0.00	
Total	351	100%	6

2020 Arkansas Democratic presidential primary

Popular vote share by county Biden—30–40% Biden—40–50% Biden—50–60% Biden—60–70% Sanders—30–40%

2020 Arkansas Democratic presidential primary
Candidate	Votes	%	Delegates
Joe Biden	93,012	40.59	17
Bernie Sanders	51,413	22.44	9
Michael Bloomberg	38,312	16.72	5
Elizabeth Warren	22,971	10.03	
Pete Buttigieg (withdrawn) (Note: Candidate withdrew after early voting had started.)	7,649	3.34	
Amy Klobuchar (withdrawn)	7,009	3.06	
Tom Steyer (withdrawn)	2,053	0.90	
Tulsi Gabbard	1,593	0.70	
Kamala Harris (withdrawn)	715	0.31	
Andrew Yang (withdrawn)	715	0.31	
Michael Bennet (withdrawn)	574	0.25	
Cory Booker (withdrawn)	572	0.25	
Marianne Williamson (withdrawn)	501	0.22	
Steve Bullock (withdrawn)	485	0.21	
John Delaney (withdrawn)	443	0.19	
Joe Sestak (withdrawn)	408	0.18	
Julian Castro (withdrawn)	304	0.13	
Other candidate	393	0.17	
Total	229,122	100%	31

=== Results by county ===
2020 Arkansas Democratic primary (results per county)
County	Joe Biden		Bernie Sanders		Michael Bloomberg		Elizabeth Warren		Pete Buttigieg		Amy Klobuchar		Tom Steyer		Tulsi Gabbard		Kamala Harris		Andrew Yang		Michael Bennet		Cory Booker		Marianne Williamson		Steve Bullock		John Delaney		Joe Sestak		Mosie Boyd		Julian Castro		Total votes cast
County	Votes	%	Votes	%	Votes	%	Votes	%	Votes	%	Votes	%	Votes	%	Votes	%	Votes	%	Votes	%	Votes	%	Votes	%	Votes	%	Votes	%	Votes	%	Votes	%	Votes	%	Votes	%	Total votes cast
Arkansas	450	49.23	125	13.68	158	17.29	81	8.86	21	2.30	35	3.83	16	1.75	10	1.09	1	0.11	0	0.00	1	0.11	0	0.00	1	0.11	3	0.33	4	0.44	0	0.00	6	0.66	2	0.22	914
Ashley	633	52.40	253	20.94	133	11.01	62	5.13	29	2.40	29	2.40	7	0.58	7	0.58	5	0.41	3	0.25	7	0.58	5	0.41	10	0.83	12	0.99	3	0.25	0	0.00	6	0.50	4	0.33	1,208
Baxter	955	43.02	448	20.18	400	18.02	188	8.47	100	4.50	79	3.56	11	0.50	7	0.32	8	0.36	7	0.32	0	0.00	0	0.00	5	0.23	4	0.18	3	0.14	3	0.14	1	0.05	1	0.05	2,220
Benton	5,745	31.65	5,270	29.03	2,819	15.53	2,438	13.43	1,001	5.51	498	2.74	118	0.65	95	0.52	9	0.05	60	0.33	10	0.06	13	0.07	18	0.10	16	0.09	9	0.05	11	0.06	5	0.03	17	0.09	18,152
Boone	676	40.36	406	24.24	265	15.82	152	9.07	65	3.88	55	3.28	8	0.48	22	1.31	2	0.12	6	0.36	2	0.12	1	0.06	3	0.18	5	0.30	3	0.18	2	0.12	1	0.06	1	0.06	1,675
Bradley	372	54.95	96	14.18	106	15.66	24	3.55	15	2.22	8	1.18	16	2.36	5	0.74	14	2.07	1	0.15	4	0.59	9	1.33	2	0.30	0	0.00	2	0.30	1	0.15	1	0.15	1	0.15	677
Calhoun	141	43.93	53	16.51	66	20.56	13	4.05	13	4.05	8	2.49	2	0.62	1	0.31	1	0.31	2	0.62	5	1.56	4	1.25	1	0.31	3	0.93	2	0.62	3	0.93	2	0.62	1	0.31	321
Carroll	742	31.60	728	31.01	293	12.48	308	13.12	120	5.11	91	3.88	12	0.51	28	1.19	4	0.17	8	0.34	2	0.09	1	0.04	4	0.17	3	0.13	1	0.04	0	0.00	1	0.04	2	0.09	2,348
Chicot	711	54.27	197	15.04	266	20.31	45	3.44	14	1.07	18	1.37	10	0.76	4	0.31	8	0.61	4	0.31	7	0.53	1	0.08	1	0.08	7	0.53	6	0.46	3	0.23	5	0.38	3	0.23	1,310
Clark	948	48.79	331	17.04	282	14.51	150	7.72	57	2.93	68	3.50	28	1.44	11	0.57	23	1.18	8	0.41	0	0.00	2	0.10	5	0.26	3	0.15	7	0.36	8	0.41	10	0.51	2	0.10	1,943
Clay	262	39.70	115	17.42	179	27.12	35	5.30	14	2.12	14	2.12	10	1.52	5	0.76	6	0.91	0	0.00	2	0.30	2	0.30	6	0.91	2	0.30	4	0.61	2	0.30	2	0.30	0	0.00	660
Cleburne	556	45.61	178	14.60	278	22.81	85	6.97	40	3.28	44	3.61	14	1.15	8	0.66	2	0.16	2	0.16	2	0.16	1	0.08	1	0.08	4	0.33	0	0.00	1	0.08	1	0.08	2	0.16	1,219
Cleveland	186	47.21	66	16.75	70	17.77	17	4.31	9	2.28	17	4.31	5	1.27	5	1.27	1	0.25	3	0.76	0	0.00	0	0.00	5	1.27	3	0.76	1	0.25	3	0.76	2	0.51	1	0.25	394
Columbia	613	52.66	175	15.03	187	16.07	51	4.38	16	1.37	25	2.15	26	2.23	13	1.12	8	0.69	4	0.34	6	0.52	6	0.52	8	0.69	7	0.60	10	0.86	6	0.52	0	0.00	3	0.26	1,164
Conway	974	45.73	359	16.85	370	17.37	125	5.87	68	3.19	62	2.91	52	2.44	27	1.27	26	1.22	6	0.28	3	0.14	6	0.28	3	0.14	6	0.28	10	0.47	10	0.47	22	1.03	1	0.05	2,130
Craighead	1,849	36.14	1,397	27.31	873	17.06	487	9.52	198	3.87	166	3.24	31	0.61	26	0.51	13	0.25	22	0.43	3	0.06	8	0.16	6	0.12	21	0.41	3	0.06	2	0.04	2	0.04	9	0.18	5,116
Crawford	1,061	37.91	623	22.26	569	20.33	221	7.90	71	2.54	80	2.86	56	2.00	30	1.07	9	0.32	14	0.50	7	0.25	7	0.25	11	0.39	4	0.14	2	0.07	6	0.21	23	0.82	5	0.18	2,799
Crittenden	1,652	53.20	491	15.81	568	18.29	144	4.64	43	1.38	68	2.19	20	0.64	21	0.68	11	0.35	20	0.64	10	0.32	9	0.29	12	0.39	7	0.23	7	0.23	11	0.35	5	0.16	6	0.19	3,105
Cross	430	48.37	149	16.76	161	18.11	44	4.95	36	4.05	22	2.47	8	0.90	4	0.45	8	0.90	3	0.34	4	0.45	5	0.56	2	0.22	3	0.34	4	0.45	3	0.34	2	0.22	1	0.11	889
Dallas	350	53.68	58	8.90	108	16.56	18	2.76	7	1.07	28	4.29	17	2.61	12	1.84	5	0.77	4	0.61	1	0.15	12	1.84	2	0.31	10	1.53	3	0.46	3	0.46	10	1.53	4	0.61	652
Desha	641	52.16	173	14.08	227	18.47	46	3.74	16	1.30	29	2.36	23	1.87	6	0.49	12	0.98	6	0.49	13	1.06	13	1.06	6	0.49	7	0.57	2	0.16	3	0.24	5	0.41	1	0.08	1,229
Drew	655	46.49	225	15.97	264	18.74	81	5.75	23	1.63	71	5.04	14	0.99	10	0.71	5	0.35	5	0.35	6	0.43	7	0.50	7	0.50	17	1.21	4	0.28	11	0.78	3	0.21	1	0.07	1,409
Faulkner	3,059	34.27	2,503	28.04	1,223	13.70	1,295	14.51	294	3.29	317	3.55	57	0.64	54	0.60	21	0.24	24	0.27	13	0.15	8	0.09	12	0.13	19	0.21	5	0.06	6	0.07	11	0.12	6	0.07	8,927
Franklin	355	36.08	147	14.94	247	25.10	72	7.32	32	3.25	42	4.27	19	1.93	13	1.32	11	1.12	3	0.30	5	0.51	11	1.12	6	0.61	2	0.20	7	0.71	4	0.41	4	0.41	4	0.41	984
Fulton	331	40.66	154	18.92	160	19.66	56	6.88	25	3.07	28	3.44	12	1.47	6	0.74	1	0.12	8	0.98	12	1.47	3	0.37	0	0.00	3	0.37	9	1.11	3	0.37	1	0.12	2	0.25	814
Garland	2,890	36.85	1,653	21.08	1,550	19.76	677	8.63	391	4.99	389	4.96	87	1.11	48	0.61	19	0.24	30	0.38	6	0.08	20	0.26	34	0.43	7	0.09	19	0.24	10	0.13	7	0.09	6	0.08	7,843
Grant	355	36.52	172	17.70	191	19.65	85	8.74	54	5.56	55	5.66	16	1.65	10	1.03	3	0.31	4	0.41	6	0.62	3	0.31	4	0.41	6	0.62	2	0.21	2	0.21	3	0.31	1	0.10	972
Greene	646	34.96	399	21.59	426	23.05	133	7.20	82	4.44	56	3.03	24	1.30	15	0.81	3	0.16	15	0.81	7	0.38	11	0.60	5	0.27	12	0.65	10	0.54	4	0.22	0	0.00	0	0.00	1,848
Hempstead	549	55.57	128	12.96	149	15.08	43	4.35	15	1.52	28	2.83	10	1.01	8	0.81	9	0.91	1	0.10	4	0.40	2	0.20	9	0.91	15	1.52	10	1.01	2	0.20	2	0.20	4	0.40	988
Hot Spring	735	38.99	452	23.98	344	18.25	111	5.89	43	2.28	85	4.51	26	1.38	11	0.58	5	0.27	11	0.58	12	0.64	9	0.48	9	0.48	3	0.16	14	0.74	3	0.16	5	0.27	7	0.37	1,885
Howard	358	52.49	104	15.25	81	11.88	38	5.57	19	2.79	29	4.25	12	1.76	6	0.88	7	1.03	3	0.44	5	0.73	3	0.44	3	0.44	5	0.73	0	0.00	2	0.29	4	0.59	3	0.44	682
Independence	796	41.22	354	18.33	338	17.50	200	10.36	61	3.16	79	4.09	24	1.24	28	1.45	7	0.36	7	0.36	4	0.21	8	0.41	9	0.47	5	0.26	2	0.10	2	0.10	5	0.26	2	0.10	1,931
Izard	356	45.01	144	18.20	120	15.17	64	8.09	34	4.30	41	5.18	2	0.25	6	0.76	3	0.38	6	0.76	1	0.13	2	0.25	2	0.25	2	0.25	1	0.13	1	0.13	5	0.63	1	0.13	791
Jackson	466	46.32	163	16.20	193	19.18	57	5.67	35	3.48	31	3.08	7	0.70	12	1.19	5	0.50	2	0.20	9	0.89	2	0.20	1	0.10	5	0.50	11	1.09	4	0.40	2	0.20	1	0.10	1,006
Jefferson	5,018	48.40	1,496	14.43	2,238	21.59	649	6.26	114	1.10	197	1.90	189	1.82	85	0.82	31	0.30	40	0.39	23	0.22	62	0.60	43	0.41	27	0.26	25	0.24	64	0.62	14	0.14	53	0.51	10,368
Johnson	573	33.43	356	20.77	303	17.68	161	9.39	85	4.96	86	5.02	47	2.74	31	1.81	4	0.23	14	0.82	9	0.53	9	0.53	7	0.41	7	0.41	6	0.35	6	0.35	3	0.18	7	0.41	1,714
Lafayette	237	68.30	37	10.66	40	11.53	8	2.31	5	1.44	4	1.15	3	0.86	0	0.00	4	1.15	0	0.00	0	0.00	0	0.00	4	1.15	4	1.15	0	0.00	1	0.29	0	0.00	0	0.00	347
Lawrence	391	36.37	187	17.40	211	19.63	78	7.26	37	3.44	47	4.37	32	2.98	39	3.63	8	0.74	8	0.74	4	0.37	1	0.09	3	0.28	3	0.28	13	1.21	7	0.65	3	0.28	3	0.28	1,075
Lee	420	53.98	112	14.40	142	18.25	12	1.54	5	0.64	26	3.34	10	1.29	9	1.16	2	0.26	4	0.51	21	2.70	1	0.13	4	0.51	2	0.26	2	0.26	3	0.39	2	0.26	1	0.13	778
Lincoln	371	52.33	119	16.78	107	15.09	20	2.82	7	0.99	26	3.67	13	1.83	12	1.69	4	0.56	5	0.71	1	0.14	2	0.28	3	0.42	4	0.56	2	0.28	9	1.27	2	0.28	2	0.28	709
Little River	379	54.53	97	13.96	94	13.53	36	5.18	17	2.45	12	1.73	5	0.72	7	1.01	9	1.29	3	0.43	6	0.86	5	0.72	7	1.01	6	0.86	1	0.14	3	0.43	2	0.29	6	0.86	695
Logan	415	40.33	163	15.84	261	25.36	76	7.39	27	2.62	19	1.85	21	2.04	10	0.97	4	0.39	7	0.68	7	0.68	4	0.39	1	0.10	1	0.10	2	0.19	4	0.39	4	0.39	3	0.29	1,029
Lonoke	1,252	37.97	795	24.11	560	16.99	298	9.04	131	3.97	135	4.09	28	0.85	27	0.82	11	0.33	15	0.45	9	0.27	3	0.09	3	0.09	9	0.27	4	0.12	10	0.30	3	0.09	4	0.12	3,297
Madison	391	35.48	269	24.41	202	18.33	92	8.35	52	4.72	26	2.36	17	1.54	15	1.36	6	0.54	2	0.18	1	0.09	4	0.36	6	0.54	5	0.45	6	0.54	2	0.18	4	0.36	2	0.18	1,102
Marion	327	38.02	210	24.42	148	17.21	72	8.37	47	5.47	28	3.26	7	0.81	4	0.47	4	0.47	2	0.23	1	0.12	0	0.00	6	0.70	2	0.23	0	0.00	0	0.00	0	0.00	2	0.23	860
Miller	1,069	61.09	270	15.43	215	12.29	78	4.46	23	1.31	22	1.26	9	0.51	10	0.57	11	0.63	2	0.11	5	0.29	7	0.40	9	0.51	5	0.29	7	0.40	2	0.11	4	0.23	2	0.11	1,750
Mississippi	1,017	51.05	322	16.16	381	19.13	101	5.07	34	1.71	29	1.46	9	0.45	9	0.45	5	0.25	11	0.55	13	0.65	13	0.65	5	0.25	16	0.80	10	0.50	10	0.50	4	0.20	3	0.15	1,992
Monroe	375	48.70	132	17.14	109	14.16	39	5.06	11	1.43	12	1.56	12	1.56	16	2.08	4	0.52	4	0.52	26	3.38	10	1.30	4	0.52	5	0.65	3	0.39	5	0.65	2	0.26	1	0.13	770
Montgomery	226	45.02	85	16.93	85	16.93	36	7.17	15	2.99	27	5.38	7	1.39	3	0.60	1	0.20	1	0.20	6	1.20	1	0.20	2	0.40	2	0.40	0	0.00	2	0.40	2	0.40	1	0.20	502
Nevada	299	51.37	90	15.46	77	13.23	34	5.84	6	1.03	26	4.47	11	1.89	7	1.20	3	0.52	1	0.17	1	0.17	4	0.69	7	1.20	4	0.69	4	0.69	4	0.69	1	0.17	3	0.52	582
Newton	184	39.66	137	29.53	61	13.15	53	11.42	5	1.08	11	2.37	1	0.22	7	1.51	0	0.00	3	0.65	0	0.00	0	0.00	0	0.00	0	0.00	1	0.22	0	0.00	0	0.00	1	0.22	464
Ouachita	1,218	57.29	295	13.88	348	16.37	67	3.15	49	2.30	39	1.83	13	0.61	19	0.89	11	0.52	8	0.38	14	0.66	3	0.14	12	0.56	13	0.61	3	0.14	4	0.19	8	0.38	2	0.09	2,126
Perry	269	33.17	164	20.22	181	22.32	71	8.75	29	3.58	43	5.30	14	1.73	4	0.49	6	0.74	6	0.74	3	0.37	5	0.62	5	0.62	4	0.49	3	0.37	2	0.25	2	0.25	0	0.00	811
Phillips	969	52.52	291	15.77	296	16.04	94	5.09	19	1.03	53	2.87	8	0.43	21	1.14	10	0.54	9	0.49	7	0.38	14	0.76	6	0.33	7	0.38	18	0.98	15	0.81	2	0.11	6	0.33	1,845
Pike	190	41.67	73	16.01	68	14.91	42	9.21	16	3.51	33	7.24	8	1.75	8	1.75	2	0.44	3	0.66	4	0.88	5	1.10	1	0.22	1	0.22	0	0.00	1	0.22	0	0.00	1	0.22	456
Poinsett	393	46.56	168	19.91	157	18.60	49	5.81	10	1.18	13	1.54	12	1.42	9	1.07	2	0.24	3	0.36	2	0.24	4	0.47	3	0.36	7	0.83	4	0.47	2	0.24	4	0.47	2	0.24	844
Polk	272	31.74	208	24.27	157	18.32	74	8.63	40	4.67	40	4.67	16	1.87	13	1.52	1	0.12	9	1.05	6	0.70	1	0.12	4	0.47	1	0.12	4	0.47	7	0.82	2	0.23	2	0.23	857
Pope	1,070	34.35	861	27.64	491	15.76	323	10.37	134	4.30	113	3.63	28	0.90	19	0.61	7	0.22	11	0.35	6	0.19	3	0.10	15	0.48	8	0.26	11	0.35	10	0.32	3	0.10	2	0.06	3,115
Prairie	207	47.70	76	17.51	69	15.90	23	5.30	5	1.15	20	4.61	6	1.38	7	1.61	4	0.92	0	0.00	4	0.92	2	0.46	0	0.00	3	0.69	0	0.00	4	0.92	1	0.23	3	0.69	434
Pulaski	24,587	44.66	11,063	20.10	8,991	16.33	6,261	11.37	1,604	2.91	1,503	2.73	236	0.43	227	0.41	114	0.21	86	0.16	123	0.22	93	0.17	25	0.05	27	0.05	27	0.05	39	0.07	28	0.05	18	0.03	55,052
Randolph	333	32.84	225	22.19	246	24.26	72	7.10	35	3.45	40	3.94	9	0.89	11	1.08	13	1.28	4	0.39	2	0.20	9	0.89	3	0.30	1	0.10	6	0.59	1	0.10	1	0.10	3	0.30	1,014
Saline	3,121	37.30	1,814	21.68	1,532	18.31	834	9.97	399	4.77	385	4.60	96	1.15	39	0.47	45	0.54	22	0.26	9	0.11	14	0.17	17	0.20	2	0.02	8	0.10	10	0.12	7	0.08	13	0.16	8,367
Scott	159	44.41	55	15.36	73	20.39	16	4.47	11	3.07	13	3.63	4	1.12	6	1.68	0	0.00	0	0.00	6	1.68	5	1.40	0	0.00	4	1.12	1	0.28	1	0.28	3	0.84	1	0.28	358
Searcy	121	36.56	82	24.77	52	15.71	45	13.60	12	3.63	8	2.42	1	0.30	1	0.30	0	0.00	1	0.30	2	0.60	1	0.30	1	0.30	1	0.30	0	0.00	1	0.30	1	0.30	1	0.30	331
Sebastian	2,735	35.85	1,919	25.15	1,486	19.48	671	8.80	328	4.30	194	2.54	91	1.19	56	0.73	10	0.13	22	0.29	8	0.10	9	0.12	4	0.05	14	0.18	10	0.13	3	0.04	63	0.83	6	0.08	7,629
Sevier	255	47.22	105	19.44	94	17.41	32	5.93	11	2.04	9	1.67	6	1.11	5	0.93	3	0.56	5	0.93	2	0.37	0	0.00	6	1.11	1	0.19	1	0.19	0	0.00	0	0.00	5	0.93	540
Sharp	417	41.49	195	19.40	188	18.71	64	6.37	42	4.18	34	3.38	11	1.09	21	2.09	7	0.70	1	0.10	7	0.70	2	0.20	2	0.20	1	0.10	6	0.60	4	0.40	1	0.10	2	0.20	1,005
St. Francis	1,182	55.03	297	13.83	368	17.13	84	3.91	27	1.26	34	1.58	10	0.47	15	0.70	20	0.93	10	0.47	14	0.65	11	0.51	16	0.74	20	0.93	19	0.88	5	0.23	13	0.61	3	0.14	2,148
Stone	343	33.83	246	24.26	158	15.58	112	11.05	48	4.73	41	4.04	13	1.28	15	1.48	2	0.20	3	0.30	1	0.10	5	0.49	3	0.30	2	0.20	17	1.68	0	0.00	4	0.39	1	0.10	1,014
Union	1,350	54.09	450	18.03	356	14.26	113	4.53	51	2.04	38	1.52	14	0.56	15	0.60	29	1.16	2	0.08	8	0.32	25	1.00	16	0.64	4	0.16	7	0.28	9	0.36	4	0.16	5	0.20	2,496
Van Buren	418	37.79	198	17.90	217	19.62	121	10.94	43	3.89	55	4.97	21	1.90	12	1.08	1	0.09	1	0.09	3	0.27	2	0.18	3	0.27	5	0.45	1	0.09	3	0.27	1	0.09	1	0.09	1,106
Washington	6,914	28.33	8,491	34.79	3,007	12.32	3,884	15.91	920	3.77	687	2.81	149	0.61	157	0.64	22	0.09	58	0.24	14	0.06	22	0.09	17	0.07	14	0.06	14	0.06	8	0.03	9	0.04	19	0.08	24,406
White	1,401	42.53	685	20.80	599	18.18	284	8.62	86	2.61	111	3.37	26	0.79	29	0.88	14	0.43	17	0.52	9	0.27	4	0.12	4	0.12	6	0.18	4	0.12	4	0.12	8	0.24	3	0.09	3,294
Woodruff	303	43.66	120	17.29	119	17.15	57	8.21	12	1.73	15	2.16	15	2.16	8	1.15	3	0.43	6	0.86	5	0.72	3	0.43	4	0.58	3	0.43	8	1.15	6	0.86	6	0.86	1	0.14	694
Yell	342	36.42	166	17.68	161	17.15	88	9.37	36	3.83	60	6.39	25	2.66	11	1.17	3	0.32	4	0.43	3	0.32	10	1.06	7	0.75	3	0.32	5	0.53	2	0.21	8	0.85	5	0.53	939
Total	93,011	40.59	51,413	22.44	38,312	16.72	22,970	10.03	7,649	3.34	7,009	3.06	2,053	0.90	1,593	0.70	715	0.31	715	0.31	574	0.25	572	0.25	501	0.22	485	0.21	443	0.19	408	0.18	393	0.17	304	0.13	229,120

2020 California Democratic presidential primary

2020 California Democratic presidential primary
Candidate	Votes	%	Delegates
Bernie Sanders	2,080,846	35.97	225
Joe Biden	1,613,854	27.90	172
Elizabeth Warren	762,555	13.18	11
Michael Bloomberg	701,803	12.13	7
Pete Buttigieg (withdrawn) (Note: Candidate withdrew shortly before the primary, when all-mail voting had already begun.)	249,256	4.31	
Amy Klobuchar (withdrawn)	126,961	2.19	
Tom Steyer (withdrawn)	113,092	1.96	
Andrew Yang (withdrawn) (Note: Candidate withdrew following the New Hampshire primary, when all-mail voting had already begun.)	43,571	0.75	
Tulsi Gabbard	33,769	0.58	
Julian Castro (withdrawn)	13,892	0.24	
Michael Bennet (withdrawn)	7,377	0.13	
Marianne Williamson (withdrawn)	7,052	0.12	
Cory Booker (withdrawn)	6,000	0.10	
John Delaney (withdrawn)	4,606	0.08	
Joe Sestak (withdrawn)	3,270	0.06	
Deval Patrick (withdrawn)	2,022	0.03	
Other candidates / Write-in	(Note: Including 34 write-in votes)14,438	0.25	
Total	5,784,364	100%	415

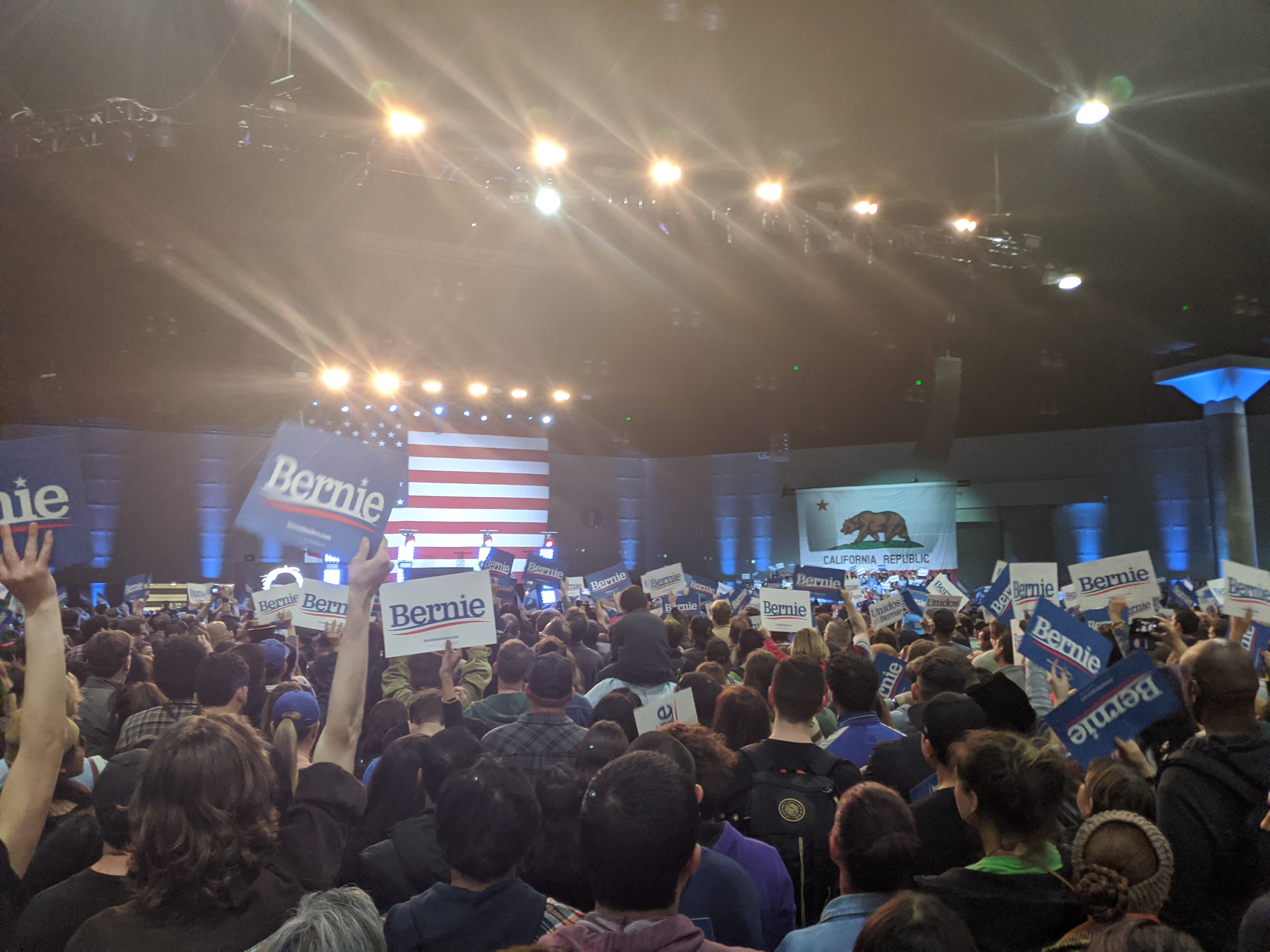
Bernie Sanders rally at the Los Angeles Convention Center

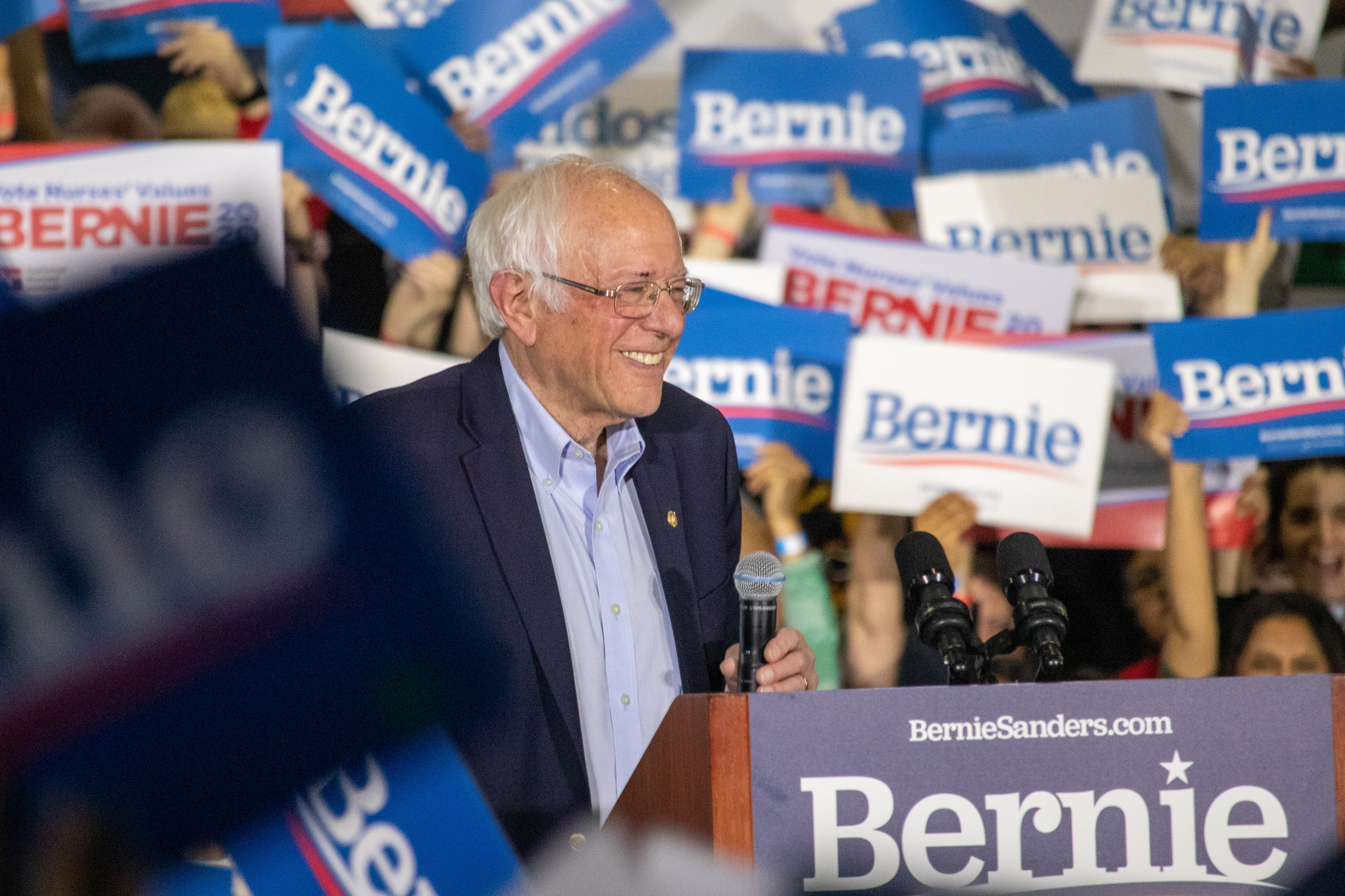
Senator Bernie Sanders at a campaign rally in San Jose on March 1, 2020

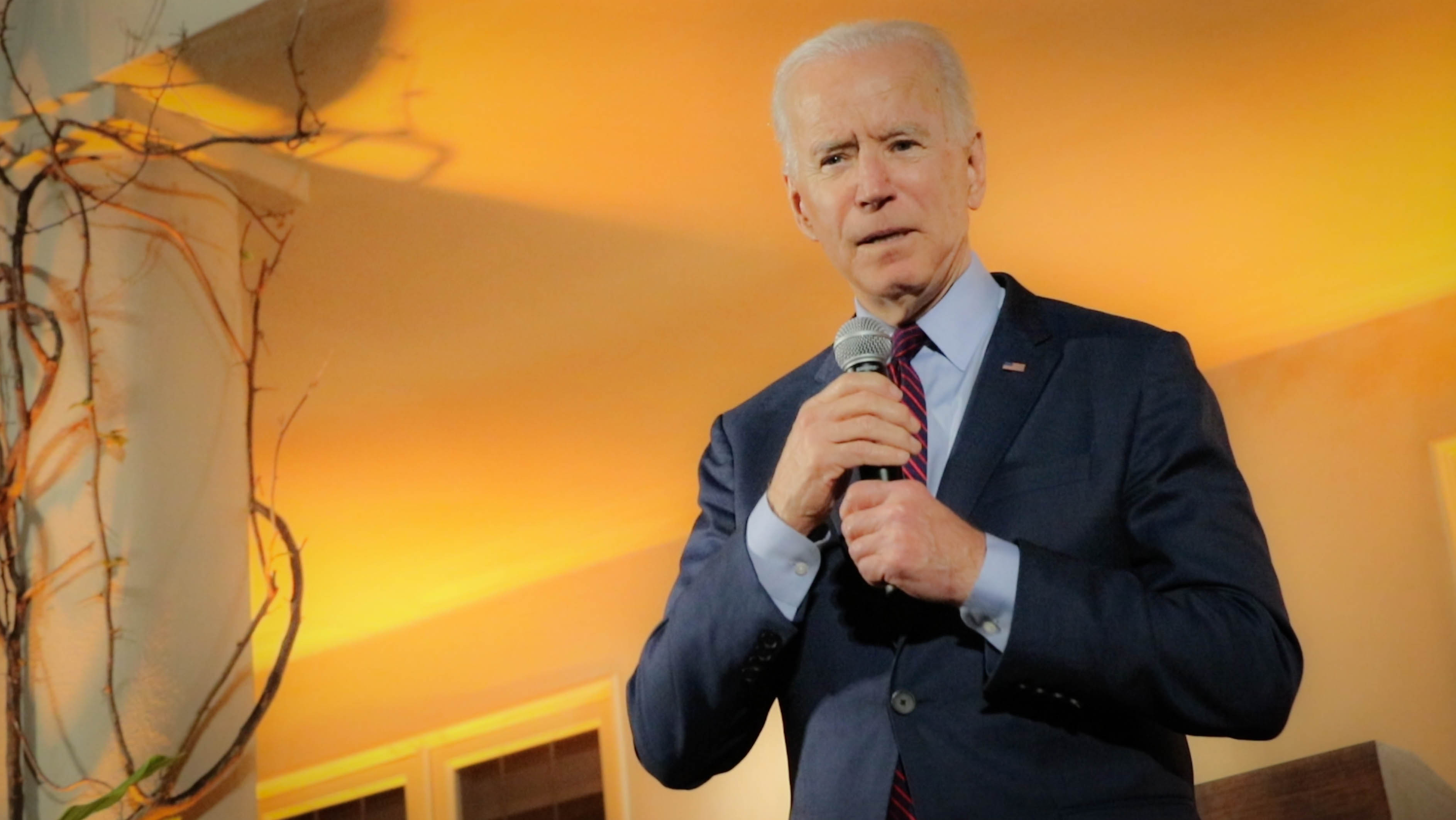
Joe Biden's presidential campaign in Bel Air, Los Angeles, on March 5, 2020

Votes (percentage) and delegates by district
District	Bernie Sanders		Joe Biden		Michael Bloomberg		Elizabeth Warren		Total delegates	District region	Largest city
1st	34%	2	23.7%	2	10.3%	0	12.9%	0	4	Shasta Cascade	Chico, Redding
2nd	33.3%	3	25.3%	2	13.5%	0	15.9%	1	6	North Coast	Eureka
3rd	34.3%	3	29.3%	2	12%	0	12%	0	5	Sacramento Valley	Fairfield
4th	26.1%	2	29.6%	3	14.7%	0	11.4%	0	5	Sierras	Roseville
5th	32.7%	3	27.2%	3	14.9%	0	12.6%	0	6	Wine Country	Santa Rosa
6th	35.8%	3	28.1%	2	10.7%	0	14.3%	0	5	Sacramento Valley	Sacramento
7th	30.9%	2	31.4%	3	13%	0	11.2%	0	5	Sacramento Valley	Elk Grove
8th	35.7%	2	31.2%	2	11.8%	0	8.8%	0	4	Eastern Desert	Victorville
9th	32.9%	2	32.5%	2	15.9%	1	7%	0	5	San Joaquin Valley	Stockton
10th	35.5%	2	29.1%	1	15.3%	1	7.2%	0	4	San Joaquin Valley	Modesto
11th	29%	2	30.7%	3	15.3%	1	14.7%	0	6	Bay Area	Concord
12th	33.8%	3	23.9%	2	11%	0	23.4%	2	7	San Francisco Bay Area	San Francisco
13th	38.7%	3	22.4%	2	8.1%	0	24.7%	2	7	Bay Area	Oakland
14th	31.9%	3	26.4%	2	15.6%	1	14.8%	0	6	Bay Area	Daly City
15th	34.1%	3	29.5%	3	14.4%	0	11.5%	0	6	Bay Area	Hayward
16th	40.9%	3	26.2%	1	12.6%	0	7.2%	0	4	San Joaquin Valley	Fresno, Merced
17th	36.1%	3	25.9%	2	14.3%	0	12.5%	0	5	Bay Area	Fremont, Santa Clara
18th	26.6%	2	29%	2	15.4%	1	17.1%	1	6	Bay Area	Sunnyvale
19th	38.9%	4	25.9%	2	13.6%	0	10.7%	0	6	Bay Area	San Jose
20th	39.8%	3	25.5%	2	10.9%	0	13%	0	5	Central Coast	Salinas
21st	43.2%	3	25.3%	1	13.7%	0	5.1%	0	4	San Joaquin Valley	Kings, Kern, SW Fresno
22nd	34.4%	2	29.1%	2	13%	0	8.8%	0	4	San Joaquin Valley	Visalia
23rd	34.9%	2	30.2%	2	12.2%	0	9%	0	4	South Central California	Bakersfield
24th	35.3%	3	26.8%	2	10.5%	0	14.7%	0	5	Central Coast	Santa Maria
25th	35.6%	3	33.6%	2	10%	0	10%	0	5	LA County	Santa Clarita
26th	34.4%	3	31.1%	2	12.1%	0	11.5%	0	5	Central Coast	Oxnard
27th	35.9%	2	29.2%	2	10.2%	0	15.7%	1	5	LA County	San Gabriel Valley
28th	40%	3	22.7%	2	7.5%	0	21.7%	1	6	LA County	Glendale
29th	49.8%	3	21.5%	2	7.7%	0	11.2%	0	5	LA County	San Fernando Valley
30th	32.6%	3	31.2%	2	11.2%	0	15.4%	1	6	LA County	San Fernando Valley
31st	39.1%	3	32.3%	2	11%	0	8.3%	0	5	Southern California	San Bernardino
32nd	44.7%	3	28.2%	2	10.5%	0	7.5%	0	5	LA County	El Monte
33rd	26.2%	2	34.2%	3	14.3%	0	16.1%	1	6	LA County	Santa Monica, Coastal LA
34th	53.7%	4	16.8%	1	8.1%	0	14.7%	0	5	LA County	Downtown Los Angeles
35th	46.6%	2	28.2%	2	10.9%	0	6.2%	0	4	Southern California	Fontana
36th	27.5%	1	29.8%	2	15.4%	1	8.1%	0	4	Eastern Desert	Indio
37th	35.6%	3	31.3%	2	10.1%	0	16.2%	1	6	LA County	West LA
38th	41.7%	3	30.8%	2	10.5%	0	7.6%	0	5	LA County	Norwalk
39th	36.7%	3	30.5%	2	12.6%	0	9.6%	0	5	Southern California	Fullerton
40th	56.4%	4	20.9%	1	8.9%	0	5.4%	0	5	LA County	East Los Angeles
41st	45%	3	27.9%	2	10.7%	0	7.5%	0	5	Southern California	Riverside
42nd	37%	3	31.6%	2	12.4%	0	7.9%	0	5	Southern California	Corona
43rd	36.5%	3	34.3%	2	10%	0	10.3%	0	5	LA County	Inglewood
44th	44%	3	29.6%	2	6.2%	0	9.6%	0	5	Los Angeles County	Compton
45th	34%	3	29.1%	2	13.5%	0	12%	0	5	Southern California	Irvine
46th	53.7%	2	20%	2	10.5%	0	7.7%	0	4	Southern California	Anaheim
47th	38.5%	3	27.3%	2	10.6%	0	12.2%	0	5	Southern California	Long Beach
48th	30.4%	2	30.3%	2	16.3%	1	11%	0	5	Southern California	Huntington Beach
49th	30.6%	3	30.5%	2	14.6%	0	12.2%	0	5	Southern California	Oceanside
50th	34.9%	2	27.6%	2	13%	0	11.3%	0	4	Southern California	Escondido
51st	49.2%	3	23.7%	2	11.3%	0	6.8%	0	5	Southern California	Downtown San Diego and Border Communities
52nd	30.6%	3	30%	3	13.4%	0	14.6%	0	6	Southern California	North San Diego
53rd	37.8%	3	27.3%	3	10.1%	0	14.5%	0	6	Southern California	Eastern San Diego and suburbs
Total	36.0%	144	27.9%	109	12.1%	7	13.2%	11	271		

Pledged delegates
Delegate type	Bernie Sanders	Joe Biden	Michael Bloomberg	Elizabeth Warren
At-large	51	39	0	0
PLEO	30	24	0	0
District-level	144	109	7	11
Total	225	172	7	11

2020 Colorado Democratic presidential primary

Results by county Sanders—<30% Sanders—30–40% Sanders—40–50% Sanders—50–60% Biden—<30% Biden—30–40% Bloomberg—<30% Bloomberg—30–40%

The results were certified on March 30. The race was called for Bernie Sanders who won a plurality of votes and delegates.

2020 Colorado Democratic presidential primary
Candidate	Votes	%	Delegates
Bernie Sanders	355,293	37.00	29 (Note: 24 delegates, if Bloomberg's and Warren's statewide delegates would have been calculated.)
Joe Biden	236,565	24.64	21 (Note: 17 delegates, if Bloomberg's and Warren's statewide delegates would have been calculated.)
Michael Bloomberg	177,727	18.51	9 (Note: 14 delegates, if Bloomberg's and Warren's statewide delegates would have been calculated.)
Elizabeth Warren	168,695	17.57	8 (Note: 12 delegates, if Bloomberg's and Warren's statewide delegates would have been calculated.)
Tulsi Gabbard	10,037	1.05	
Andrew Yang (withdrawn)	3,988	0.42	
Tom Steyer (withdrawn) (Note: Candidate withdrew shortly before the primary and after the start of early in-person voting.)	3,323	0.35	
Cory Booker (withdrawn)	1,276	0.13	
Marianne Williamson (withdrawn)	1,086	0.11	
Deval Patrick (withdrawn)	227	0.02	
Other candidates	1,911	0.20	
Total	960,128	100%	67

=== Results by county ===
2020 Colorado Democratic primary (results per county) (Note: Michael Bennet, Pete Buttigieg, John Delaney and Amy Klobuchar officially withdrew. Thus all votes cast for them were not counted.)
County	Bernie Sanders		Joe Biden		Michael Bloomberg		Elizabeth Warren		Tulsi Gabbard		Andrew Yang		Tom Steyer		Cory Booker		Roque De La Fuente III		Marianne Williamson		Rita Krichevsky		Robby Wells		Deval Patrick		Total votes cast
County	Votes	%	Votes	%	Votes	%	Votes	%	Votes	%	Votes	%	Votes	%	Votes	%	Votes	%	Votes	%	Votes	%	Votes	%	Votes	%	Total votes cast
Adams	28,300	42.78	14,998	22.67	12,517	18.92	8,760	13.24	690	1.04	319	0.48	204	0.31	92	0.14	96	0.15	82	0.12	40	0.06	30	0.05	25	0.04	66,153
Alamosa	934	43.06	481	22.18	348	16.04	328	15.12	20	0.92	8	0.37	21	0.97	2	0.09	11	0.51	10	0.46	3	0.14	2	0.09	1	0.05	2,169
Arapahoe	37,902	35.98	27,219	25.84	21,591	20.50	16,412	15.58	1,008	0.96	425	0.40	324	0.31	157	0.15	96	0.09	116	0.11	41	0.04	28	0.03	24	0.02	105,343
Archuleta	662	35.04	465	24.62	373	19.75	333	17.63	23	1.22	2	0.11	14	0.74	4	0.21	2	0.11	7	0.37	4	0.21	0	0.00	0	0.00	1,889
Baca	60	25.10	71	29.71	43	17.99	31	12.97	13	5.44	2	0.84	3	1.26	7	2.93	2	0.84	1	0.42	3	1.26	1	0.42	2	0.84	239
Bent	154	34.22	108	24.00	128	28.44	36	8.00	4	0.89	3	0.67	9	2.00	1	0.22	2	0.44	3	0.67	1	0.22	1	0.22	0	0.00	450
Boulder	37,563	37.60	22,924	22.95	15,138	15.15	22,706	22.73	777	0.78	302	0.30	227	0.23	76	0.08	51	0.05	84	0.08	16	0.02	19	0.02	10	0.01	99,893
Broomfield	5,547	34.56	4,152	25.87	2,988	18.62	3,029	18.87	187	1.17	74	0.46	48	0.30	5	0.03	4	0.02	4	0.02	5	0.03	3	0.02	4	0.02	16,050
Chaffee	1,505	35.73	1,046	24.83	794	18.85	768	18.23	48	1.14	20	0.47	13	0.31	1	0.02	4	0.09	7	0.17	2	0.05	4	0.09	0	0.00	4,212
Cheyenne	17	20.48	22	26.51	28	33.73	8	9.64	2	2.41	1	1.20	3	3.61	0	0.00	0	0.00	1	1.20	0	0.00	1	1.20	0	0.00	83
Clear Creek	728	36.86	483	24.46	380	19.24	328	16.61	28	1.42	11	0.56	8	0.41	1	0.05	1	0.05	6	0.30	0	0.00	0	0.00	1	0.05	1,975
Conejos	482	37.51	388	30.19	278	21.63	81	6.30	18	1.40	12	0.93	10	0.78	2	0.16	5	0.39	3	0.23	4	0.31	2	0.16	0	0.00	1,285
Costilla	319	40.03	202	25.35	158	19.82	83	10.41	10	1.25	8	1.00	7	0.88	1	0.13	3	0.38	2	0.25	0	0.00	4	0.50	0	0.00	797
Crowley	71	26.01	81	29.67	78	28.57	29	10.62	6	2.20	1	0.37	3	1.10	1	0.37	2	0.73	0	0.00	0	0.00	1	0.37	0	0.00	273
Custer	136	25.61	154	29.00	111	20.90	110	20.72	9	1.69	2	0.38	4	0.75	2	0.38	1	0.19	1	0.19	0	0.00	1	0.19	0	0.00	531
Delta	1,362	39.49	783	22.70	651	18.88	525	15.22	48	1.39	13	0.38	28	0.81	8	0.23	2	0.06	19	0.55	5	0.14	4	0.12	1	0.03	3,449
Denver	69,727	38.86	40,881	22.78	29,216	16.28	37,176	20.72	1,027	0.57	536	0.30	351	0.20	206	0.11	101	0.06	114	0.06	41	0.02	21	0.01	26	0.01	179,423
Dolores	75	41.90	41	22.91	23	12.85	28	15.64	6	3.35	0	0.00	4	2.23	0	0.00	2	1.12	0	0.00	0	0.00	0	0.00	0	0.00	179
Douglas	14,109	28.97	14,725	30.24	11,313	23.23	7,388	15.17	620	1.27	215	0.44	144	0.30	53	0.11	52	0.11	45	0.09	18	0.04	10	0.02	9	0.02	48,701
Eagle	3,031	32.64	2,476	26.67	2,326	25.05	1,279	13.77	89	0.96	22	0.24	32	0.34	7	0.08	3	0.03	11	0.12	5	0.05	1	0.01	3	0.03	9,285
El Paso	28,259	36.50	20,476	26.44	13,891	17.94	12,292	15.87	1,201	1.55	503	0.65	361	0.47	146	0.19	106	0.14	100	0.13	42	0.05	28	0.04	27	0.03	77,432
Elbert	642	28.89	612	27.54	557	25.07	309	13.91	52	2.34	19	0.86	11	0.50	0	0.00	7	0.32	9	0.41	1	0.05	2	0.09	1	0.05	2,222
Fremont	1,207	29.87	1,070	26.48	1,032	25.54	555	13.73	65	1.61	24	0.59	38	0.94	13	0.32	10	0.25	7	0.17	8	0.20	9	0.22	3	0.07	4,041
Garfield	3,085	38.03	1,988	24.51	1,483	18.28	1,336	16.47	101	1.25	38	0.47	36	0.44	7	0.09	9	0.11	17	0.21	6	0.07	4	0.05	2	0.02	8,112
Gilpin	603	46.49	233	17.96	185	14.26	241	18.58	19	1.46	7	0.54	1	0.08	2	0.15	3	0.23	1	0.08	2	0.15	0	0.00	0	0.00	1,297
Grand	859	37.12	551	23.81	474	20.48	359	15.51	36	1.56	9	0.39	15	0.65	5	0.22	2	0.09	2	0.09	0	0.00	2	0.09	0	0.00	2,314
Gunnison	1,877	48.89	722	18.81	532	13.86	637	16.59	36	0.94	13	0.34	12	0.31	3	0.08	1	0.03	3	0.08	1	0.03	1	0.03	1	0.03	3,839
Hinsdale	36	33.03	25	22.94	26	23.85	19	17.43	1	0.92	0	0.00	2	1.83	0	0.00	0	0.00	0	0.00	0	0.00	0	0.00	0	0.00	109
Huerfano	484	35.85	311	23.04	294	21.78	190	14.07	28	2.07	6	0.44	10	0.74	7	0.52	11	0.81	2	0.15	2	0.15	3	0.22	2	0.15	1,350
Jackson	26	31.33	32	38.55	8	9.64	14	16.87	1	1.20	1	1.20	1	1.20	0	0.00	0	0.00	0	0.00	0	0.00	0	0.00	0	0.00	83
Jefferson	42,803	35.78	29,197	24.41	23,502	19.65	21,361	17.86	1,352	1.13	486	0.41	415	0.35	123	0.10	136	0.11	138	0.12	43	0.04	35	0.03	25	0.02	119,616
Kiowa	16	22.86	23	32.86	18	25.71	5	7.14	5	7.14	2	2.86	0	0.00	0	0.00	0	0.00	1	1.43	0	0.00	0	0.00	0	0.00	70
Kit Carson	109	29.70	95	25.89	107	29.16	36	9.81	6	1.63	4	1.09	2	0.54	0	0.00	3	0.82	0	0.00	1	0.27	3	0.82	1	0.27	367
La Plata	4,380	39.95	2,658	24.25	1,577	14.38	2,052	18.72	141	1.29	37	0.34	63	0.57	6	0.05	16	0.15	21	0.19	7	0.06	4	0.04	1	0.01	10,963
Lake	605	45.42	286	21.47	173	12.99	222	16.67	23	1.73	9	0.68	2	0.15	3	0.23	3	0.23	4	0.30	2	0.15	0	0.00	0	0.00	1,332
Larimer	26,661	39.34	15,667	23.11	10,341	15.26	13,648	20.14	742	1.09	257	0.38	214	0.32	68	0.10	56	0.08	68	0.10	25	0.04	24	0.04	8	0.01	67,779
Las Animas	696	31.15	647	28.96	539	24.13	232	10.38	59	2.64	5	0.22	11	0.49	10	0.45	18	0.81	5	0.22	8	0.36	2	0.09	2	0.09	2,234
Lincoln	82	31.42	60	22.99	50	19.16	48	18.39	8	3.07	4	1.53	5	1.92	1	0.38	1	0.38	0	0.00	0	0.00	2	0.77	0	0.00	261
Logan	388	30.24	325	25.33	342	26.66	155	12.08	23	1.79	11	0.86	13	1.01	9	0.70	10	0.78	3	0.23	2	0.16	1	0.08	1	0.08	1,283
Mesa	5,267	32.78	4,520	28.13	3,115	19.38	2,552	15.88	219	1.36	109	0.68	138	0.86	42	0.26	33	0.21	41	0.26	19	0.12	9	0.06	6	0.04	16,070
Mineral	60	30.30	48	24.24	36	18.18	44	22.22	3	1.52	0	0.00	4	2.02	0	0.00	2	1.01	0	0.00	0	0.00	0	0.00	1	0.51	198
Moffat	206	36.79	146	26.07	90	16.07	84	15.00	12	2.14	6	1.07	1	0.18	5	0.89	3	0.54	4	0.71	1	0.18	1	0.18	1	0.18	560
Montezuma	1,234	41.82	705	23.89	425	14.40	467	15.83	43	1.46	15	0.51	32	1.08	6	0.20	8	0.27	10	0.34	2	0.07	3	0.10	1	0.03	2,951
Montrose	1,209	30.45	1,169	29.44	875	22.03	556	14.00	70	1.76	18	0.45	39	0.98	10	0.25	9	0.23	4	0.10	2	0.05	8	0.20	2	0.05	3,971
Morgan	560	31.37	459	25.71	482	27.00	206	11.54	38	2.13	8	0.45	9	0.50	5	0.28	11	0.62	3	0.17	3	0.17	1	0.06	0	0.00	1,785
Otero	663	33.22	533	26.70	525	26.30	181	9.07	35	1.75	16	0.80	19	0.95	6	0.30	8	0.40	3	0.15	2	0.10	2	0.10	3	0.15	1,996
Ouray	513	37.55	355	25.99	199	14.57	260	19.03	19	1.39	3	0.22	10	0.73	3	0.22	1	0.07	2	0.15	0	0.00	0	0.00	1	0.07	1,366
Park	1,033	40.56	591	23.20	395	15.51	438	17.20	49	1.92	10	0.39	14	0.55	0	0.00	7	0.27	5	0.20	3	0.12	1	0.04	1	0.04	2,547
Phillips	74	27.51	74	27.51	74	27.51	28	10.41	5	1.86	2	0.74	3	1.12	2	0.74	3	1.12	2	0.74	2	0.74	0	0.00	0	0.00	269
Pitkin	1,480	29.99	1,330	26.95	1,457	29.52	605	12.26	29	0.59	15	0.30	12	0.24	3	0.06	2	0.04	2	0.04	0	0.00	0	0.00	0	0.00	4,935
Prowers	227	30.23	200	26.63	188	25.03	92	12.25	9	1.20	12	1.60	4	0.53	8	1.07	5	0.67	2	0.27	1	0.13	3	0.40	0	0.00	751
Pueblo	7,802	31.30	7,360	29.53	6,335	25.41	2,535	10.17	305	1.22	150	0.60	140	0.56	65	0.26	120	0.48	40	0.16	32	0.13	32	0.13	11	0.04	24,927
Rio Blanco	81	30.57	73	27.55	58	21.89	49	18.49	2	0.75	0	0.00	1	0.38	0	0.00	0	0.00	1	0.38	0	0.00	0	0.00	0	0.00	265
Rio Grande	479	37.22	291	22.61	319	24.79	161	12.51	7	0.54	4	0.31	5	0.39	9	0.70	7	0.54	3	0.23	0	0.00	0	0.00	2	0.16	1,287
Routt	1,842	33.27	1,486	26.84	1,215	21.94	883	15.95	54	0.98	13	0.23	23	0.42	7	0.13	3	0.05	5	0.09	3	0.05	1	0.02	2	0.04	5,537
Saguache	619	52.10	181	15.24	168	14.14	172	14.48	13	1.09	9	0.76	7	0.59	3	0.25	6	0.51	7	0.59	1	0.08	2	0.17	0	0.00	1,188
San Juan	86	43.00	34	17.00	31	15.50	38	19.00	4	2.00	2	1.00	1	0.50	2	1.00	2	1.00	0	0.00	0	0.00	0	0.00	0	0.00	200
San Miguel	1,039	45.79	462	20.36	356	15.69	362	15.95	25	1.10	8	0.35	7	0.31	1	0.04	4	0.18	1	0.04	1	0.04	1	0.04	2	0.09	2,269
Sedgwick	57	31.67	41	22.78	40	22.22	25	13.89	6	3.33	2	1.11	3	1.67	2	1.11	0	0.00	0	0.00	3	1.67	1	0.56	0	0.00	180
Summit	2,260	36.99	1,626	26.61	1,153	18.87	954	15.61	69	1.13	13	0.21	21	0.34	4	0.07	3	0.05	5	0.08	2	0.03	0	0.00	0	0.00	6,110
Teller	912	34.12	731	27.35	471	17.62	459	17.17	43	1.61	20	0.75	18	0.67	2	0.07	8	0.30	7	0.26	1	0.04	0	0.00	1	0.04	2,673
Washington	66	35.48	39	20.97	40	21.51	28	15.05	5	2.69	2	1.08	1	0.54	0	0.00	0	0.00	2	1.08	3	1.61	0	0.00	0	0.00	186
Weld	11,911	39.25	7,304	24.07	5,927	19.53	4,308	14.20	426	1.40	132	0.43	136	0.45	61	0.20	57	0.19	38	0.13	25	0.08	10	0.03	13	0.04	30,348
Yuma	111	23.32	129	27.10	140	29.41	59	12.39	15	3.15	8	1.68	6	1.26	1	0.21	2	0.42	2	0.42	1	0.21	2	0.42	0	0.00	476
Total	355,293	37.00	236,565	24.64	177,727	18.51	168,695	17.57	10,037	1.05	3,988	0.42	3,323	0.35	1,276	0.13	1,136	0.12	1,086	0.11	445	0.05	330	0.03	227	0.02	960,128

2020 Maine Democratic presidential primary

Results by county Biden—30–40% Biden—40–50% Sanders—30–40%

2020 Maine Democratic presidential primary
Candidate	Votes	%	Delegates
Joe Biden	68,729	33.37	11
Bernie Sanders	66,826	32.45	9
Elizabeth Warren	32,055	15.57	4
Michael Bloomberg	24,294	11.80	
Pete Buttigieg (withdrawn) (Note: Candidate withdrew during absentee voting, shortly before the date of the election.)	4,364	2.12	
Amy Klobuchar (withdrawn)	2,826	1.37	
Tulsi Gabbard	1,815	0.88	
Andrew Yang (withdrawn) (Note: Candidate withdrew following the New Hampshire primary, when absentee voting had already begun.)	696	0.34	
Tom Steyer (withdrawn)	313	0.15	
Deval Patrick (withdrawn)	218	0.11	
Marianne Williamson (withdrawn)	201	0.10	
Cory Booker (withdrawn)	183	0.09	
Blank ballots	3,417	1.66	
Total	205,937	100%	24

=== Results by county ===
2020 Maine Democratic primary (results per county)
County	Joe Biden		Bernie Sanders		Elizabeth Warren		Michael Bloomberg		Pete Buttigieg		Amy Klobuchar		Tulsi Gabbard		Andrew Yang		Tom Steyer		Deval Patrick		Marianne Williamson		Cory Booker		Blank ballots		Total votes cast
County	Votes	%	Votes	%	Votes	%	Votes	%	Votes	%	Votes	%	Votes	%	Votes	%	Votes	%	Votes	%	Votes	%	Votes	%	Votes	%	Total votes cast
Androscoggin	4,076	34.20	3,639	30.54	1,431	12.01	1,762	14.79	246	2.06	139	1.17	160	1.34	47	0.39	22	0.18	35	0.29	20	0.17	14	0.12	326	2.74	11,917
Aroostook	2,558	46.15	1,256	22.66	361	6.51	851	15.35	88	1.59	50	0.90	34	0.61	28	0.51	14	0.25	11	0.20	11	0.20	16	0.29	265	4.78	5,543
Cumberland	20,555	31.18	22,187	33.66	12,701	19.27	6,766	10.26	1,521	2.31	957	1.45	413	0.63	149	0.23	63	0.10	37	0.06	32	0.05	43	0.07	500	0.76	65,924
Franklin	1,226	33.93	1,329	36.78	414	11.46	390	10.79	49	1.36	40	1.11	40	1.11	18	0.50	11	0.30	16	0.44	7	0.19	5	0.14	68	1.88	3,613
Hancock	2,988	31.28	3,328	34.84	1,756	18.39	1,005	10.52	171	1.79	125	1.31	32	0.34	31	0.32	19	0.20	2	0.02	10	0.10	8	0.08	76	0.80	9,551
Kennebec	5,651	35.59	4,775	30.07	2,222	13.99	2,062	12.99	314	1.98	208	1.31	185	1.17	65	0.41	29	0.18	17	0.11	20	0.13	13	0.08	318	2.00	15,879
Knox	2,586	32.44	2,611	32.75	1,486	18.64	892	11.19	106	1.33	102	1.28	65	0.82	22	0.28	1	0.01	9	0.11	4	0.05	5	0.06	83	1.04	7,972
Lincoln	2,138	34.21	2,020	32.33	979	15.67	753	12.05	117	1.87	86	1.38	47	0.75	17	0.27	5	0.08	21	0.34	2	0.03	4	0.06	60	0.96	6,249
Oxford	2,282	35.52	2,199	34.23	739	11.50	736	11.46	99	1.54	66	1.03	93	1.45	30	0.47	8	0.12	3	0.05	10	0.16	6	0.09	154	2.40	6,425
Penobscot	5,392	33.24	5,526	34.07	2,138	13.18	2,045	12.61	265	1.63	216	1.33	125	0.77	89	0.55	27	0.17	23	0.14	22	0.14	20	0.12	332	2.05	16,220
Piscataquis	520	36.31	425	29.68	147	10.27	234	16.34	22	1.54	17	1.19	8	0.56	7	0.49	2	0.14	2	0.14	4	0.28	3	0.21	41	2.86	1,432
Sagadahoc	2,274	32.15	2,054	29.04	1,245	17.60	830	11.74	128	1.81	94	1.33	69	0.98	14	0.20	10	0.14	3	0.04	3	0.04	1	0.01	347	4.91	7,072
Somerset	1,553	36.46	1,225	28.76	360	8.45	699	16.41	86	2.02	45	1.06	53	1.24	38	0.89	12	0.28	5	0.12	12	0.28	6	0.14	166	3.90	4,260
Waldo	1,902	29.64	2,469	38.48	1,038	16.18	664	10.35	101	1.57	69	1.08	44	0.69	18	0.28	8	0.12	4	0.06	9	0.14	7	0.11	83	1.29	6,416
Washington	1,131	36.41	892	28.72	389	12.52	410	13.20	61	1.96	48	1.55	30	0.97	10	0.32	4	0.13	5	0.16	4	0.13	8	0.26	114	3.67	3,106
York	11,781	35.42	10,454	31.43	4,286	12.88	4,154	12.49	904	2.72	523	1.57	414	1.24	109	0.33	77	0.23	25	0.08	31	0.09	24	0.07	483	1.45	33,265
UOCAVA	116	10.61	437	39.98	363	33.21	41	3.75	86	7.87	41	3.75	3	0.27	4	0.37	1	0.09	0	0	0	0	0	0	1	0.09	1,093
Total	68,729	33.37	66,826	32.45	32,055	15.57	24,294	11.80	4,364	2.12	2,826	1.37	1,815	0.88	696	0.34	313	0.15	218	0.11	201	0.10	183	0.09	3,417	1.66	205,937

2020 Massachusetts Democratic presidential primary

2020 Massachusetts Democratic presidential primary
Candidate	Votes	%	Delegates
Joe Biden	473,861	33.41	37
Bernie Sanders	376,990	26.58	30
Elizabeth Warren	303,864	21.43	24
Michael Bloomberg	166,200	11.72	
Pete Buttigieg (withdrawn) (Note: Candidate withdrew after early voting started, but before the date of the election.)	38,400	2.71	
Amy Klobuchar (withdrawn)	17,297	1.22	
Tulsi Gabbard	10,548	0.74	
Deval Patrick (withdrawn)	6,923	0.49	
Tom Steyer (withdrawn)	6,762	0.48	
Andrew Yang (withdrawn)	2,708	0.19	
Michael Bennet (withdrawn)	1,257	0.09	
John Delaney (withdrawn)	675	0.05	
Marianne Williamson (withdrawn)	617	0.04	
Cory Booker (withdrawn)	426	0.03	
Julian Castro (withdrawn)	305	0.02	
All Others	1,941	0.14	
No Preference	5,345	0.38	
Blank ballots	4,061	0.29	
Total	1,418,180	100%	91

=== Results by county ===
2020 Massachusetts Democratic primary (results per county)
County	Joe Biden		Bernie Sanders		Elizabeth Warren		Michael Bloomberg		Pete Buttigieg		Amy Klobuchar		Tulsi Gabbard		Deval Patrick		Tom Steyer		Andrew Yang		Michael Bennet		John Delaney		Marianne Williamson		Cory Booker		Julian Castro		No Preference		Blank ballots		All Others		Total votes cast
County	Votes	%	Votes	%	Votes	%	Votes	%	Votes	%	Votes	%	Votes	%	Votes	%	Votes	%	Votes	%	Votes	%	Votes	%	Votes	%	Votes	%	Votes	%	Votes	%	Votes	%	Votes	%	Total votes cast
Barnstable	21,423	38.44	12,106	21.72	9,399	16.86	8,011	14.37	2,177	3.91	1,056	1.89	388	0.70	213	0.38	426	0.76	86	0.15	45	0.08	18	0.03	31	0.06	13	0.02	2	0.00	186	0.33	103	0.18	51	0.09	55,734
Berkshire	10,978	38.35	8,196	28.63	5,549	19.38	2,634	9.20	461	1.61	227	0.79	115	0.40	210	0.73	28	0.10	26	0.09	15	0.05	11	0.04	13	0.05	6	0.02	11	0.04	80	0.28	44	0.15	22	0.08	28,626
Bristol	29,181	36.91	22,885	28.94	10,606	13.41	10,350	13.09	2,196	2.78	818	1.03	635	0.80	547	0.69	488	0.62	120	0.15	88	0.11	46	0.06	44	0.06	37	0.05	25	0.03	504	0.64	307	0.39	189	0.24	79,066
Dukes	1,962	32.63	1,632	27.15	1,287	21.41	718	11.94	192	3.19	99	1.65	36	0.60	19	0.32	30	0.50	8	0.13	5	0.08	0	0.00	3	0.05	2	0.03	1	0.02	7	0.12	6	0.10	5	0.08	6,012
Essex	52,900	33.97	41,877	26.89	28,220	18.12	20,661	13.27	4,761	3.06	2,111	1.36	1,482	0.95	852	0.55	890	0.57	264	0.17	167	0.11	79	0.05	67	0.04	49	0.03	48	0.03	586	0.38	445	0.29	268	0.17	155,727
Franklin	4,804	23.54	8,185	40.11	5,159	25.28	1,274	6.24	305	1.49	159	0.78	161	0.79	84	0.41	66	0.32	42	0.21	8	0.04	47	0.23	10	0.05	2	0.01	1	0.00	44	0.22	44	0.22	13	0.06	20,408
Hampden	23,009	36.60	19,260	30.63	8,599	13.68	7,860	12.50	1,170	1.86	599	0.95	484	0.77	537	0.85	141	0.22	118	0.19	165	0.26	62	0.10	30	0.05	28	0.04	44	0.07	319	0.51	257	0.41	189	0.30	62,871
Hampshire	10,722	24.35	15,318	34.78	12,986	29.49	3,052	6.93	721	1.64	426	0.97	231	0.52	141	0.32	57	0.13	58	0.13	17	0.04	9	0.02	16	0.04	8	0.02	6	0.01	146	0.33	86	0.20	41	0.09	44,041
Middlesex	123,553	30.54	99,704	24.64	109,318	27.02	45,727	11.30	11,302	2.79	5,328	1.32	2,733	0.68	1,374	0.34	1,517	0.37	895	0.22	255	0.06	136	0.03	124	0.03	102	0.03	49	0.01	1,269	0.31	827	0.20	404	0.10	404,617
Nantucket	1,055	40.56	624	23.99	384	14.76	373	14.34	66	2.54	35	1.35	15	0.58	9	0.35	17	0.65	4	0.15	2	0.08	4	0.15	1	0.04	0	0.00	0	0.00	9	0.35	2	0.08	1	0.04	2,601
Norfolk	61,914	37.02	36,074	21.57	34,126	20.40	23,101	13.81	4,791	2.86	2,317	1.39	1,352	0.81	658	0.39	862	0.52	345	0.21	102	0.06	55	0.03	68	0.04	42	0.03	11	0.01	694	0.41	467	0.28	275	0.16	167,254
Plymouth	37,270	38.64	23,254	24.11	14,214	14.74	13,390	13.88	3,352	3.48	1,400	1.45	933	0.97	566	0.59	789	0.82	164	0.17	60	0.06	53	0.05	59	0.06	33	0.03	19	0.02	468	0.49	306	0.32	127	0.13	96,457
Suffolk	47,608	29.79	48,636	30.43	41,885	26.21	13,745	8.60	2,513	1.57	965	0.60	819	0.51	974	0.61	377	0.24	312	0.20	213	0.13	103	0.06	70	0.04	59	0.04	52	0.03	464	0.29	818	0.51	196	0.12	159,809
Worcester	47,482	35.18	39,239	29.08	22,132	16.40	15,304	11.34	4,393	3.26	1,757	1.30	1,164	0.86	739	0.55	1,074	0.80	266	0.20	115	0.09	52	0.04	81	0.06	45	0.03	36	0.03	569	0.42	349	0.26	160	0.12	134,957
Total	473,861	33.41	376,990	26.58	303,864	21.43	166,200	11.72	38,400	2.71	17,297	1.22	10,548	0.74	6,923	0.49	6,762	0.48	2,708	0.19	1,257	0.09	675	0.05	617	0.04	426	0.03	305	0.02	5,345	0.38	4,061	0.29	1,941	0.14	1,418,180

2020 Minnesota Democratic presidential primary

Popular vote share by county
Biden—30–40%
Biden—40–50%
Biden—50–60%
Biden—60–70%
Sanders—<30%
Sanders—30–40%
Klobuchar—<30%
Klobuchar—30–40%
Klobuchar—40–50%

Popular vote share by congressional district
Biden—30–40%
Biden—40–50%
Sanders—30–40%

2020 Minnesota Democratic presidential primary
Candidate	Votes	%	Delegates
Joe Biden	287,553	38.64	38
Bernie Sanders	222,431	29.89	27
Elizabeth Warren	114,674	15.41	10
Michael Bloomberg	61,882	8.32	
Amy Klobuchar (withdrawn) (Note: Candidate withdrew shortly before the primary when absentee voting had already begun.)	41,530	5.58	
Pete Buttigieg (withdrawn)	7,616	1.02	
Tulsi Gabbard	2,504	0.34	
Andrew Yang (withdrawn) (Note: Candidate withdrew after the New Hampshire primary when absentee voting had already begun.)	1,749	0.24	
Tom Steyer (withdrawn)	551	0.07	
Michael Bennet (withdrawn)	315	0.04	
Marianne Williamson (withdrawn)	226	0.03	
Cory Booker (withdrawn)	197	0.03	
John Delaney (withdrawn) (Note: Candidate withdrew during the first days of absentee voting.)	172	0.02	
Julian Castro (withdrawn)	114	0.02	
Deval Patrick (withdrawn) (Note: Candidate withdrew after in-person absentee voting started on January 17, 2020.)	72	0.01	
Uncommitted	2,612	0.35	
Total	744,198	100%	75

=== Results by county ===
2020 Minnesota Democratic primary (results per county) (Note: The results are official because they were certified by the State Canvassing Board on March 10, 2020 before being retrieved on April 2, 2020.)
County	Joe Biden		Bernie Sanders		Elizabeth Warren		Michael Bloomberg		Amy Klobuchar		Pete Buttigieg		Tulsi Gabbard		Andrew Yang		Tom Steyer		Michael Bennet		Marianne Williamson		Cory Booker		John Delaney		Julian Castro		Deval Patrick		Uncommitted		Total votes cast
County	Votes	%	Votes	%	Votes	%	Votes	%	Votes	%	Votes	%	Votes	%	Votes	%	Votes	%	Votes	%	Votes	%	Votes	%	Votes	%	Votes	%	Votes	%	Votes	%	Total votes cast
Aitkin	510	32.84	260	16.74	84	5.41	228	14.68	395	25.43	36	2.32	4	0.26	1	0.06	8	0.52	0	0	1	0.06	0	0	2	0.13	0	0	1	0.06	23	1.48	1,553
Anoka	15,176	42.20	11,280	31.37	4,156	11.56	3,303	9.18	1,425	3.96	221	0.61	133	0.37	105	0.29	19	0.05	15	0.04	9	0.03	1	0.00	4	0.01	3	0.01	1	0.00	111	0.31	35,962
Becker	1,120	50.61	440	19.88	188	8.50	187	8.45	211	9.53	26	1.17	11	0.50	5	0.23	4	0.18	0	0	0	0	0	0	2	0.09	1	0.05	0	0	18	0.81	2,213
Beltrami	1,450	32.78	1,720	38.89	407	9.20	362	8.18	357	8.07	58	1.31	23	0.52	6	0.14	5	0.11	5	0.11	1	0.02	0	0	2	0.05	1	0.02	0	0	26	0.59	4,423
Benton	982	40.31	817	33.54	244	10.02	221	9.07	120	4.93	15	0.62	11	0.45	4	0.16	1	0.04	3	0.12	0	0	2	0.08	2	0.08	1	0.04	1	0.04	12	0.49	2,436
Big Stone	123	26.00	56	11.84	29	6.13	58	12.26	175	37.00	17	3.59	3	0.63	1	0.21	3	0.63	0	0	0	0	0	0	0	0	0	0	0	0	8	1.69	473
Blue Earth	2,417	32.61	2,766	37.32	825	11.13	553	7.46	632	8.53	119	1.61	31	0.42	22	0.30	7	0.09	4	0.05	2	0.03	3	0.04	1	0.01	3	0.04	1	0.01	26	0.35	7,412
Brown	650	39.90	336	20.63	148	9.09	218	13.38	215	13.20	32	1.96	6	0.37	0	0	4	0.25	0	0	1	0.06	1	0.06	0	0	1	0.06	0	0	17	1.04	1,629
Carlton	2,056	45.17	1,134	24.91	329	7.23	515	11.31	389	8.55	56	1.23	19	0.42	8	0.18	6	0.13	3	0.07	2	0.04	3	0.07	2	0.04	0	0	1	0.02	29	0.64	4,552
Carver	5,165	48.14	2,417	22.53	1,386	12.92	1,044	9.73	514	4.79	120	1.12	34	0.32	14	0.13	9	0.08	0	0	3	0.03	0	0	0	0	0	0	0	0	23	0.21	10,729
Cass	903	35.76	615	24.36	165	6.53	371	14.69	342	13.54	76	3.01	10	0.40	9	0.36	6	0.24	3	0.12	4	0.16	0	0	1	0.04	2	0.08	0	0	18	0.71	2,525
Chippewa	319	38.57	149	18.02	57	6.89	86	10.40	179	21.64	18	2.18	5	0.60	0	0	1	0.12	0	0	0	0	1	0.12	2	0.24	1	0.12	0	0	9	1.09	827
Chisago	2,030	48.54	973	23.27	436	10.43	474	11.33	182	4.35	32	0.77	19	0.45	7	0.17	2	0.05	2	0.05	3	0.07	0	0	3	0.07	0	0	0	0	19	0.45	4,182
Clay	2,281	39.27	1,768	30.44	761	13.10	360	6.20	499	8.59	59	1.02	22	0.38	7	0.12	4	0.07	1	0.02	2	0.03	2	0.03	2	0.03	0	0	2	0.03	38	0.65	5,808
Clearwater	255	51.00	129	25.80	22	4.40	33	6.60	45	9.00	4	0.80	1	0.20	2	0.40	1	0.20	0	0	0	0	0	0	0	0	0	0	0	0	8	1.60	500
Cook	333	21.43	376	24.20	271	17.44	126	8.11	339	21.81	78	5.02	11	0.71	0	0	3	0.19	0	0	1	0.06	1	0.06	2	0.13	1	0.06	0	0	12	0.77	1,554
Cottonwood	275	51.02	107	19.85	52	9.65	73	13.54	21	3.90	4	0.74	1	0.19	1	0.19	0	0	0	0	0	0	0	0	0	0	0	0	0	0	5	0.93	539
Crow Wing	2,325	45.49	1,139	22.29	438	8.57	576	11.27	476	9.31	89	1.74	17	0.33	9	0.18	3	0.06	4	0.08	3	0.06	0	0	1	0.02	1	0.02	0	0	30	0.59	5,111
Dakota	24,759	43.84	15,479	27.41	7,457	13.20	5,115	9.06	2,622	4.64	519	0.92	182	0.32	106	0.19	24	0.04	13	0.02	17	0.03	14	0.02	7	0.01	12	0.02	2	0.00	147	0.26	56,475
Dodge	685	52.53	301	23.08	128	9.82	109	8.36	59	4.52	7	0.54	5	0.38	3	0.23	2	0.15	0	0	0	0	1	0.08	0	0	0	0	0	0	4	0.31	1,304
Douglas	1,445	52.93	468	17.14	245	8.97	340	12.45	175	6.41	22	0.81	12	0.44	3	0.11	2	0.07	3	0.11	4	0.15	0	0	0	0	1	0.04	0	0	10	0.37	2,730
Faribault	398	47.72	148	17.75	60	7.19	129	15.47	74	8.87	9	1.08	2	0.24	1	0.12	2	0.24	0	0	1	0.12	1	0.12	1	0.12	2	0.24	0	0	6	0.72	834
Fillmore	786	45.67	344	19.99	162	9.41	166	9.65	194	11.27	30	1.74	4	0.23	12	0.70	9	0.52	2	0.12	0	0	1	0.06	1	0.06	0	0	0	0	10	0.58	1,721
Freeborn	1,315	49.79	656	24.84	143	5.41	255	9.66	205	7.76	28	1.06	7	0.27	6	0.23	4	0.15	4	0.15	0	0	1	0.04	1	0.04	0	0	0	0	16	0.61	2,641
Goodhue	2,178	47.94	960	21.13	492	10.83	509	11.20	289	6.36	49	1.08	28	0.62	8	0.18	6	0.13	1	0.02	0	0	1	0.02	1	0.02	1	0.02	0	0	20	0.44	4,543
Grant	115	18.95	80	13.18	28	4.61	89	14.66	236	38.88	29	4.78	6	0.99	5	0.82	0	0	0	0	1	0.16	1	0.16	0	0	0	0	0	0	17	2.80	607
Hennepin	92,107	34.52	88,560	33.19	51,339	19.24	19,072	7.15	10,991	4.12	2,504	0.94	734	0.28	532	0.20	127	0.05	84	0.03	66	0.02	67	0.03	49	0.02	31	0.01	19	0.01	515	0.19	266,797
Houston	964	49.16	506	25.80	196	9.99	189	9.64	74	3.77	6	0.31	8	0.41	0	0	1	0.05	1	0.05	0	0	0	0	1	0.05	0	0	0	0	15	0.76	1,961
Hubbard	788	43.20	421	23.08	149	8.17	209	11.46	196	10.75	28	1.54	5	0.27	3	0.16	8	0.44	1	0.05	0	0	0	0	2	0.11	0	0	0	0	14	0.77	1,824
Isanti	1,217	49.27	595	24.09	195	7.89	292	11.82	124	5.02	12	0.49	15	0.61	6	0.24	1	0.04	1	0.04	0	0	1	0.04	0	0	0	0	0	0	11	0.45	2,470
Itasca	1,988	38.33	1,001	19.30	340	6.55	667	12.86	879	16.95	156	3.01	27	0.52	15	0.29	13	0.25	4	0.08	3	0.06	5	0.10	1	0.02	2	0.04	3	0.06	83	1.60	5,187
Jackson	282	45.71	107	17.34	36	5.83	74	11.99	95	15.40	7	1.13	3	0.49	1	0.16	2	0.32	3	0.49	0	0	0	0	0	0	0	0	0	0	7	1.13	617
Kanabec	513	51.61	228	22.94	82	8.25	106	10.66	40	4.02	10	1.01	3	0.30	2	0.20	0	0	0	0	1	0.10	1	0.10	1	0.10	1	0.10	0	0	6	0.60	994
Kandiyohi	1,496	49.68	589	19.56	236	7.84	371	12.32	238	7.90	31	1.03	8	0.27	12	0.40	3	0.10	3	0.10	3	0.10	3	0.10	1	0.03	1	0.03	0	0	16	0.53	3,011
Kittson	158	31.10	50	9.84	28	5.51	39	7.68	198	38.98	13	2.56	3	0.59	0	0	0	0	3	0.59	0	0	0	0	1	0.20	1	0.20	0	0	14	2.76	508
Koochiching	535	42.80	212	16.96	67	5.36	201	16.08	185	14.80	26	2.08	4	0.32	0	0	4	0.32	1	0.08	1	0.08	0	0	0	0	1	0.08	0	0	13	1.04	1,250
Lac qui Parle	221	35.02	75	11.89	29	4.60	71	11.25	201	31.85	17	2.69	1	0.16	0	0	1	0.16	1	0.16	1	0.16	0	0	0	0	1	0.16	0	0	12	1.90	631
Lake	812	44.18	459	24.97	184	10.01	211	11.48	122	6.64	21	1.14	3	0.16	4	0.22	7	0.38	1	0.05	0	0	0	0	1	0.05	0	0	0	0	13	0.71	1,838
Lake of the Woods	99	28.53	42	12.10	9	2.59	36	10.37	115	33.14	28	8.07	3	0.86	1	0.29	2	0.58	0	0	2	0.58	1	0.29	0	0	0	0	0	0	9	2.59	347
Le Sueur	735	37.50	345	17.60	142	7.24	255	13.01	402	20.51	35	1.79	13	0.66	4	0.20	1	0.05	2	0.10	2	0.10	0	0	1	0.05	1	0.05	0	0	22	1.12	1,960
Lincoln	209	65.31	47	14.69	15	4.69	24	7.50	17	5.31	1	0.31	3	0.94	2	0.63	1	0.31	0	0	0	0	0	0	0	0	0	0	0	0	1	0.31	320
Lyon	616	39.04	388	24.59	150	9.51	162	10.27	199	12.61	28	1.77	7	0.44	5	0.32	3	0.19	1	0.06	1	0.06	0	0	1	0.06	0	0	0	0	17	1.08	1,578
Mahnomen	864	46.15	482	25.75	156	8.33	237	12.66	95	5.07	13	0.69	9	0.48	8	0.43	1	0.05	0	0	0	0	1	0.05	1	0.05	0	0	0	0	5	0.27	1,872
Marshall	105	23.65	124	27.93	11	2.48	53	11.94	125	28.15	8	1.80	3	0.68	0	0	2	0.45	2	0.45	0	0	0	0	0	0	0	0	1	0.23	10	2.25	444
Martin	166	27.39	74	12.21	24	3.96	69	11.39	206	33.99	40	6.60	3	0.50	4	0.66	3	0.50	1	0.17	0	0	1	0.17	0	0	0	0	0	0	15	2.48	606
McLeod	450	50.00	177	19.67	95	10.56	104	11.56	50	5.56	7	0.78	2	0.22	2	0.22	1	0.11	1	0.11	0	0	1	0.11	0	0	0	0	0	0	10	1.11	900
Meeker	536	42.01	221	17.32	90	7.05	164	12.85	211	16.54	31	2.43	4	0.31	5	0.39	0	0	2	0.16	1	0.08	2	0.16	0	0	0	0	0	0	9	0.71	1,276
Mille Lacs	653	44.06	413	27.87	110	7.42	196	13.23	91	6.14	13	0.88	3	0.20	0	0	1	0.07	0	0	0	0	0	0	0	0	0	0	0	0	2	0.13	1,482
Morrison	706	43.18	318	19.45	109	6.67	204	12.48	221	13.52	26	1.59	11	0.67	6	0.37	3	0.18	1	0.06	4	0.24	0	0	1	0.06	0	0	1	0.06	24	1.47	1,635
Mower	1,499	45.00	781	23.45	200	6.00	370	11.11	317	9.52	75	2.25	15	0.45	28	0.84	13	0.39	4	0.12	2	0.06	0	0	2	0.06	2	0.06	0	0	23	0.69	3,331
Murray	270	44.63	89	14.71	31	5.12	58	9.59	115	19.01	21	3.47	2	0.33	0	0	2	0.33	0	0	1	0.17	0	0	2	0.33	0	0	0	0	14	2.31	605
Nicollet	1,554	35.86	1,331	30.72	638	14.72	387	8.93	322	7.43	55	1.27	11	0.25	9	0.21	6	0.14	1	0.02	1	0.02	1	0.02	1	0.02	1	0.02	0	0	15	0.35	4,333
Nobles	344	37.19	253	27.35	51	5.51	107	11.57	117	12.65	23	2.49	6	0.65	0	0	2	0.22	0	0	3	0.32	1	0.11	2	0.22	0	0	0	0	16	1.73	925
Norman	183	30.20	102	16.83	42	6.93	59	9.74	171	28.22	30	4.95	2	0.33	3	0.50	3	0.50	0	0	0	0	0	0	1	0.17	0	0	0	0	10	1.65	606
Olmsted	8,524	42.76	5,462	27.40	2,748	13.78	1,382	6.93	1,331	6.68	236	1.18	73	0.37	53	0.27	12	0.06	7	0.04	4	0.02	5	0.03	5	0.03	3	0.02	3	0.02	87	0.44	19,935
Otter Tail	2,166	52.03	800	19.22	404	9.70	388	9.32	284	6.82	33	0.79	31	0.74	15	0.36	3	0.07	1	0.02	0	0	3	0.07	3	0.07	1	0.02	0	0	31	0.74	4,163
Pennington	364	47.21	193	25.03	47	6.10	47	6.10	89	11.54	12	1.56	4	0.52	7	0.91	1	0.13	0	0	0	0	0	0	0	0	0	0	0	0	7	0.91	771
Pine	915	43.14	474	22.35	175	8.25	282	13.30	200	9.43	33	1.56	10	0.47	2	0.09	2	0.09	2	0.09	1	0.05	0	0	0	0	1	0.05	0	0	24	1.13	2,121
Pipestone	207	42.77	82	16.94	26	5.37	55	11.36	85	17.56	11	2.27	5	1.03	1	0.21	4	0.83	1	0.21	0	0	0	0	0	0	0	0	0	0	7	1.45	484
Polk	796	38.44	400	19.31	144	6.95	171	8.26	422	20.38	64	3.09	11	0.53	10	0.48	7	0.34	2	0.10	3	0.14	2	0.10	0	0	1	0.05	2	0.10	36	1.74	2,071
Pope	430	49.09	130	14.84	47	5.37	109	12.44	137	15.64	8	0.91	5	0.57	1	0.11	2	0.23	1	0.11	0	0	0	0	0	0	0	0	1	0.11	5	0.57	876
Ramsey	34,706	33.13	34,498	32.93	21,971	20.97	6,928	6.61	4,631	4.42	905	0.86	303	0.29	366	0.35	55	0.05	41	0.04	29	0.03	33	0.03	31	0.03	12	0.01	13	0.01	239	0.23	104,761
Red Lake	70	25.64	35	12.82	16	5.86	15	5.49	113	41.39	12	4.40	2	0.73	0	0	0	0	0	0	0	0	0	0	0	0	0	0	0	0	10	3.66	273
Redwood	344	50.89	163	24.11	55	8.14	55	8.14	36	5.33	5	0.74	5	0.74	5	0.74	2	0.30	1	0.15	1	0.15	0	0	1	0.15	0	0	0	0	3	0.44	676
Renville	370	49.60	156	20.91	52	6.97	104	13.94	51	6.84	4	0.54	3	0.40	1	0.13	0	0	3	0.40	0	0	0	0	0	0	1	0.13	0	0	1	0.13	746
Rice	3,212	37.02	2,853	32.88	1,484	17.10	571	6.58	395	4.55	73	0.84	36	0.41	11	0.13	4	0.05	5	0.06	3	0.03	2	0.02	3	0.03	1	0.01	1	0.01	22	0.25	8,676
Rock	223	38.65	102	17.68	40	6.93	42	7.28	134	23.22	22	3.81	6	1.04	0	0	3	0.52	0	0	0	0	1	0.17	0	0	1	0.17	0	0	3	0.52	577
Roseau	270	37.71	105	14.66	47	6.56	80	11.17	142	19.83	23	3.21	11	1.54	6	0.84	0	0	1	0.14	1	0.14	0	0	0	0	0	0	0	0	30	4.19	716
Saint Louis	14,115	42.38	10,054	30.18	3,682	11.05	3,228	9.69	1,528	4.59	233	0.70	137	0.41	63	0.19	35	0.11	16	0.05	10	0.03	6	0.02	4	0.01	5	0.02	7	0.02	185	0.56	33,308
Scott	5,820	45.05	3,544	27.43	1,493	11.56	1,204	9.32	590	4.57	121	0.94	59	0.46	25	0.19	9	0.07	2	0.02	2	0.02	1	0.01	4	0.03	1	0.01	1	0.01	44	0.34	12,920
Sherburne	2,794	46.23	1,640	27.13	583	9.65	625	10.34	280	4.63	47	0.78	28	0.46	5	0.08	4	0.07	9	0.15	2	0.03	0	0	1	0.02	0	0	3	0.05	23	0.38	6,044
Sibley	328	41.31	135	17.00	59	7.43	119	14.99	115	14.48	19	2.39	6	0.76	1	0.13	2	0.25	1	0.13	0	0	0	0	1	0.13	0	0	0	0	8	1.01	794
Stearns	4,204	38.60	3,355	30.81	1,271	11.67	998	9.16	773	7.10	134	1.23	44	0.40	26	0.24	12	0.11	7	0.06	5	0.05	4	0.04	3	0.03	4	0.04	1	0.01	50	0.46	10,891
Steele	1,142	43.89	671	25.79	257	9.88	310	11.91	156	6.00	21	0.81	13	0.50	6	0.23	2	0.08	3	0.12	0	0	4	0.15	3	0.12	1	0.04	0	0	13	0.50	2,602
Stevens	227	22.10	370	36.03	151	14.70	69	6.72	171	16.65	18	1.75	5	0.49	1	0.10	5	0.49	1	0.10	2	0.19	0	0	0	0	0	0	1	0.10	6	0.58	1,027
Swift	291	37.31	114	14.62	47	6.03	112	14.36	192	24.62	9	1.15	2	0.26	2	0.26	0	0	0	0	0	0	1	0.13	0	0	0	0	0	0	10	1.28	780
Todd	605	53.30	239	21.06	92	8.11	116	10.22	59	5.20	3	0.26	3	0.26	1	0.09	0	0	0	0	1	0.09	1	0.09	0	0	0	0	2	0.18	13	1.15	1,135
Traverse	110	39.71	38	13.72	8	2.89	31	11.19	78	28.16	10	3.61	0	0	1	0.36	0	0	0	0	0	0	0	0	0	0	0	0	0	0	1	0.36	277
Wabasha	841	49.24	350	20.49	146	8.55	207	12.12	124	7.26	19	1.11	7	0.41	4	0.23	3	0.18	1	0.06	1	0.06	1	0.06	0	0	0	0	0	0	4	0.23	1,708
Wadena	336	48.28	175	25.14	51	7.33	69	9.91	46	6.61	9	1.29	3	0.43	1	0.14	2	0.29	0	0	0	0	0	0	0	0	0	0	1	0.14	3	0.43	696
Waseca	616	51.59	282	23.62	106	8.88	115	9.63	52	4.36	5	0.42	6	0.50	1	0.08	2	0.17	3	0.25	1	0.08	0	0	0	0	0	0	0	0	5	0.42	1,194
Washington	16,244	46.18	8,827	25.09	4,241	12.06	3,297	9.37	1,874	5.33	355	1.01	103	0.29	98	0.28	20	0.06	17	0.05	7	0.02	10	0.03	5	0.01	6	0.02	1	0.00	71	0.20	35,176
Watonwan	251	32.43	141	18.22	58	7.49	114	14.73	170	21.96	20	2.58	2	0.26	2	0.26	2	0.26	3	0.39	0	0	1	0.13	0	0	1	0.13	0	0	9	1.16	774
Wilkin	130	32.18	55	13.61	21	5.20	45	11.14	127	31.44	14	3.47	2	0.50	0	0	0	0	0	0	0	0	0	0	0	0	0	0	1	0.25	9	2.23	404
Winona	2,221	38.77	1,916	33.44	773	13.49	523	9.13	186	3.25	34	0.59	24	0.42	13	0.23	2	0.03	1	0.02	4	0.07	2	0.03	0	0	1	0.02	1	0.02	28	0.49	5,729
Wright	4,294	49.12	2,053	23.49	880	10.07	933	10.67	395	4.52	77	0.88	36	0.41	22	0.25	7	0.08	5	0.06	2	0.02	1	0.01	2	0.02	1	0.01	0	0	33	0.38	8,741
Yellow Medicine	266	47.42	111	19.79	32	5.70	51	9.09	77	13.73	9	1.60	1	0.18	2	0.36	3	0.53	0	0	0	0	0	0	0	0	0	0	0	0	9	1.60	561
Total	287,553	38.64	222,431	29.89	114,674	15.41	61,882	8.32	41,530	5.58	7,616	1.02	2,504	0.34	1,749	0.24	551	0.07	315	0.04	226	0.03	197	0.03	172	0.02	114	0.02	72	0.01	2,612	0.35	744,198

2020 North Carolina Democratic presidential primary

Popular vote share by county Biden—<30% Biden—30–40% Biden—40–50% Biden—50–60% Biden—60–70% Sanders—30–40% Sanders—40–50%

2020 North Carolina Democratic presidential primary
Candidate	Votes	%	Delegates
Joe Biden	572,271	42.95	68
Bernie Sanders	322,645	24.22	37
Michael Bloomberg	172,558	12.95	3
Elizabeth Warren	139,912	10.50	2
Pete Buttigieg (withdrawn) (Note: Candidate withdrew during early voting, shortly before the date of the election.)	43,632	3.27	
Amy Klobuchar (withdrawn)	30,742	2.31	
Tom Steyer (withdrawn)	10,679	0.80	
Tulsi Gabbard	6,622	0.50	
Andrew Yang (withdrawn)	2,973	0.22	
Cory Booker (withdrawn)	2,181	0.16	
Michael Bennet (withdrawn)	1,978	0.15	
Deval Patrick (withdrawn)	1,341	0.10	
Marianne Williamson (withdrawn)	1,243	0.09	
John Delaney (withdrawn)	1,098	0.08	
Julian Castro (withdrawn)	699	0.05	
No Preference	21,808	1.64	
Total	1,332,382	100%	110

=== Results by county ===
2020 North Carolina Democratic primary (results per county)
County	Joe Biden		Bernie Sanders		Michael Bloomberg		Elizabeth Warren		Pete Buttigieg		Amy Klobuchar		Tom Steyer		Tulsi Gabbard		Andrew Yang		Cory Booker		Michael Bennet		Deval Patrick		Marianne Williamson		John Delaney		Julian Castro		No Preference		Total votes cast
County	Votes	%	Votes	%	Votes	%	Votes	%	Votes	%	Votes	%	Votes	%	Votes	%	Votes	%	Votes	%	Votes	%	Votes	%	Votes	%	Votes	%	Votes	%	Votes	%	Total votes cast
Alamance	7,702	43.61	4,383	24.82	2,307	13.06	1,646	9.32	600	3.40	386	2.19	112	0.63	85	0.48	42	0.24	29	0.16	27	0.15	17	0.10	17	0.10	24	0.14	23	0.13	261	1.48	17,661
Alexander	933	40.44	435	18.86	430	18.64	137	5.94	87	3.77	81	3.51	50	2.17	20	0.87	16	0.69	8	0.35	3	0.13	6	0.26	3	0.13	5	0.22	3	0.13	90	3.90	2,307
Alleghany	366	33.83	210	19.41	244	22.55	54	4.99	56	5.18	62	5.73	13	1.20	10	0.92	2	0.18	1	0.09	0	0	3	0.28	2	0.18	3	0.28	3	0.28	53	4.90	1,082
Anson	2,077	62.28	431	12.92	365	10.94	88	2.64	32	0.96	54	1.62	37	1.11	12	0.36	9	0.27	11	0.33	23	0.69	9	0.27	5	0.15	4	0.12	1	0.03	177	5.31	3,335
Ashe	969	40.27	536	22.28	379	15.75	233	9.68	101	4.20	72	2.99	13	0.54	21	0.87	5	0.21	2	0.08	6	0.25	1	0.04	1	0.04	2	0.08	2	0.08	63	2.62	2,406
Avery	457	44.07	272	26.23	128	12.34	87	8.39	20	1.93	39	3.76	5	0.48	7	0.68	0	0	1	0.10	1	0.10	1	0.10	0	0	2	0.19	0	0	17	1.64	1,037
Beaufort	2,761	52.34	774	14.67	876	16.61	267	5.06	136	2.58	147	2.79	39	0.74	43	0.82	12	0.23	13	0.25	23	0.44	10	0.19	12	0.23	12	0.23	5	0.09	145	2.75	5,275
Bertie	1,803	56.68	513	16.13	460	14.46	74	2.33	29	0.91	58	1.82	18	0.57	38	1.19	13	0.41	7	0.22	18	0.57	10	0.31	4	0.13	12	0.38	3	0.09	121	3.80	3,181
Bladen	2,499	59.11	581	13.74	515	12.18	138	3.26	40	0.95	72	1.70	42	0.99	41	0.97	12	0.28	14	0.33	14	0.33	7	0.17	10	0.24	5	0.12	4	0.09	234	5.53	4,228
Brunswick	7,806	45.12	2,600	15.03	3,558	20.56	1,082	6.25	1,029	5.95	768	4.44	125	0.72	68	0.39	13	0.08	16	0.09	21	0.12	17	0.10	16	0.09	7	0.04	5	0.03	171	0.99	17,302
Buncombe	15,533	24.94	23,440	37.64	4,928	7.91	10,655	17.11	3,074	4.94	2,397	3.85	1,193	1.92	366	0.59	109	0.18	31	0.05	49	0.08	20	0.03	40	0.06	22	0.04	22	0.04	403	0.65	62,282
Burke	3,026	43.88	1,495	21.68	1,034	14.99	478	6.93	229	3.32	224	3.25	74	1.07	45	0.65	21	0.30	20	0.29	14	0.20	6	0.09	5	0.07	11	0.16	4	0.06	210	3.05	6,896
Cabarrus	10,666	49.97	5,364	25.13	2,348	11.00	1,682	7.88	390	1.83	275	1.29	108	0.51	107	0.50	44	0.21	36	0.17	28	0.13	14	0.07	12	0.06	10	0.05	14	0.07	248	1.16	21,346
Caldwell	1,853	41.72	1,041	23.44	683	15.38	301	6.78	187	4.21	116	2.61	39	0.88	31	0.70	17	0.38	10	0.23	8	0.18	8	0.18	7	0.16	5	0.11	3	0.07	133	2.99	4,442
Camden	403	51.47	118	15.07	126	16.09	53	6.77	29	3.70	13	1.66	4	0.51	3	0.38	0	0	1	0.13	0	0	3	0.38	1	0.13	2	0.26	0	0	27	3.45	783
Carteret	2,969	43.55	1,251	18.35	1,237	18.15	502	7.36	288	4.22	248	3.64	57	0.84	52	0.76	17	0.25	10	0.15	8	0.12	5	0.07	10	0.15	5	0.07	6	0.09	152	2.23	6,817
Caswell	1,473	48.09	569	18.58	476	15.54	143	4.67	46	1.50	55	1.80	27	0.88	21	0.69	7	0.23	8	0.26	10	0.33	6	0.20	13	0.42	2	0.07	4	0.13	203	6.63	3,063
Catawba	4,618	41.09	2,775	24.69	1,732	15.41	876	7.79	502	4.47	312	2.78	94	0.84	52	0.46	30	0.27	18	0.16	14	0.12	18	0.16	9	0.08	15	0.13	5	0.04	170	1.51	11,240
Chatham	6,455	37.44	3,408	19.77	2,794	16.21	2,388	13.85	845	4.90	700	4.06	103	0.60	123	0.71	38	0.22	17	0.10	21	0.12	19	0.11	17	0.10	20	0.12	16	0.09	276	1.60	17,240
Cherokee	831	43.30	446	23.24	246	12.82	140	7.30	66	3.44	55	2.87	21	1.09	19	0.99	10	0.52	3	0.16	4	0.21	4	0.21	6	0.31	8	0.42	3	0.16	57	2.97	1,919
Chowan	831	54.49	184	12.07	275	18.03	78	5.11	45	2.95	36	2.36	9	0.59	5	0.33	2	0.13	1	0.07	5	0.33	2	0.13	6	0.39	3	0.20	1	0.07	42	2.75	1,525
Clay	416	42.84	201	20.70	130	13.39	92	9.47	41	4.22	41	4.22	8	0.82	4	0.41	1	0.10	3	0.31	6	0.62	1	0.10	1	0.10	2	0.21	2	0.21	22	2.27	971
Cleveland	4,197	51.73	1,406	17.33	1,250	15.41	424	5.23	132	1.63	174	2.14	81	1.00	41	0.51	16	0.20	16	0.20	25	0.31	17	0.21	14	0.17	12	0.15	5	0.06	304	3.75	8,114
Columbus	2,566	54.43	832	17.65	525	11.14	197	4.18	45	0.95	89	1.89	53	1.12	30	0.64	14	0.30	21	0.45	21	0.45	18	0.38	21	0.45	15	0.32	1	0.02	266	5.64	4,714
Craven	5,100	48.81	1,748	16.73	1,894	18.13	565	5.41	391	3.74	301	2.88	70	0.67	48	0.46	26	0.25	19	0.18	25	0.24	6	0.06	11	0.11	10	0.10	2	0.02	233	2.23	10,449
Cumberland	19,559	54.40	7,393	20.56	4,822	13.41	1,921	5.34	533	1.48	373	1.04	171	0.48	167	0.46	98	0.27	103	0.29	84	0.23	35	0.10	44	0.12	27	0.08	28	0.08	595	1.65	35,953
Currituck	960	47.60	427	21.17	276	13.68	171	8.48	54	2.68	36	1.78	8	0.40	18	0.89	2	0.10	4	0.20	1	0.05	0	0	1	0.05	1	0.05	3	0.15	55	2.73	2,017
Dare	2,179	40.91	1,282	24.07	780	14.65	511	9.59	233	4.37	154	2.89	26	0.49	46	0.86	7	0.13	7	0.13	11	0.21	2	0.04	7	0.13	2	0.04	2	0.04	77	1.45	5,326
Davidson	4,472	45.04	2,234	22.50	1,503	15.14	569	5.73	346	3.49	283	2.85	64	0.64	75	0.76	33	0.33	16	0.16	14	0.14	9	0.09	10	0.10	60	0.60	15	0.15	225	2.27	9,928
Davie	1,275	40.27	706	22.30	552	17.44	238	7.52	133	4.20	118	3.73	21	0.66	21	0.66	9	0.28	4	0.13	4	0.13	7	0.22	6	0.19	9	0.28	4	0.13	59	1.86	3,166
Duplin	2,486	55.55	675	15.08	689	15.40	133	2.97	45	1.01	82	1.83	25	0.56	30	0.67	14	0.31	11	0.25	17	0.38	13	0.29	9	0.20	17	0.38	6	0.13	223	4.98	4,475
Durham	29,664	36.22	22,104	26.99	7,504	9.16	16,580	20.24	2,926	3.57	1,805	2.20	263	0.32	224	0.27	137	0.17	92	0.11	63	0.08	62	0.08	43	0.05	18	0.02	27	0.03	398	0.49	81,910
Edgecombe	3,982	56.29	1,043	14.74	1,198	16.94	252	3.56	73	1.03	80	1.13	44	0.62	53	0.75	16	0.23	25	0.35	28	0.40	20	0.28	14	0.20	14	0.20	4	0.06	228	3.22	7,074
Forsyth	23,929	42.69	14,296	25.51	7,797	13.91	5,307	9.47	2,166	3.86	1,152	2.06	203	0.36	182	0.32	131	0.23	109	0.19	77	0.14	43	0.08	52	0.09	27	0.05	29	0.05	547	0.98	56,047
Franklin	3,732	45.94	1,580	19.45	1,218	14.99	496	6.11	189	2.33	460	5.66	51	0.63	47	0.58	33	0.41	22	0.27	19	0.23	15	0.18	10	0.12	10	0.12	9	0.11	232	2.86	8,123
Gaston	7,920	46.94	4,043	23.96	2,159	12.80	1,207	7.15	478	2.83	345	2.04	146	0.87	89	0.53	36	0.21	29	0.17	23	0.14	27	0.16	16	0.09	8	0.05	10	0.06	336	1.99	16,872
Gates	751	53.19	221	15.65	226	16.01	71	5.03	15	1.06	25	1.77	10	0.71	12	0.85	5	0.35	5	0.35	11	0.78	5	0.35	1	0.07	3	0.21	1	0.07	50	3.54	1,412
Graham	249	43.23	97	16.84	69	11.98	33	5.73	12	2.08	28	4.86	29	5.03	6	1.04	2	0.35	1	0.17	5	0.87	0	0	2	0.35	0	0	0	0	43	7.47	576
Granville	3,472	46.05	1,583	20.99	1,062	14.08	471	6.25	220	2.92	192	2.55	55	0.73	68	0.90	17	0.23	17	0.23	19	0.25	26	0.34	16	0.21	13	0.17	6	0.08	303	4.02	7,540
Greene	1,098	49.64	417	18.85	315	14.24	82	3.71	19	0.86	52	2.35	31	1.40	11	0.50	13	0.59	10	0.45	9	0.41	8	0.36	8	0.36	5	0.23	3	0.14	131	5.92	2,212
Guilford	37,425	45.65	21,337	26.02	10,288	12.55	7,491	9.14	2,205	2.69	1,396	1.70	298	0.36	251	0.31	181	0.22	167	0.20	131	0.16	84	0.10	63	0.08	37	0.05	39	0.05	597	0.73	81,990
Halifax	4,844	62.02	1,131	14.48	882	11.29	259	3.32	73	0.93	103	1.32	32	0.41	67	0.86	15	0.19	21	0.27	39	0.50	21	0.27	12	0.15	12	0.15	4	0.05	296	3.79	7,811
Harnett	4,324	49.05	1,924	21.83	1,157	13.13	541	6.14	218	2.47	157	1.78	61	0.69	57	0.65	37	0.42	25	0.28	27	0.31	16	0.18	11	0.12	16	0.18	5	0.06	239	2.71	8,815
Haywood	3,446	40.31	1,952	22.84	849	9.93	769	9.00	382	4.47	356	4.16	352	4.12	66	0.77	23	0.27	12	0.14	17	0.20	7	0.08	16	0.19	3	0.04	5	0.06	293	3.43	8,548
Henderson	5,713	38.36	3,729	25.04	1,588	10.66	1,641	11.02	866	5.81	698	4.69	416	2.79	68	0.46	21	0.14	8	0.05	13	0.09	7	0.05	9	0.06	4	0.03	13	0.09	100	0.67	14,894
Hertford	2,377	60.90	433	11.09	534	13.68	103	2.64	32	0.82	44	1.13	11	0.28	38	0.97	7	0.18	13	0.33	14	0.36	7	0.18	4	0.10	9	0.23	2	0.05	275	7.05	3,903
Hoke	2,801	53.48	1,114	21.27	648	12.37	215	4.11	68	1.30	55	1.05	39	0.74	20	0.38	20	0.38	23	0.44	20	0.38	6	0.11	8	0.15	8	0.15	3	0.06	189	3.61	5,237
Hyde	380	47.38	128	15.96	86	10.72	83	10.35	7	0.87	23	2.87	10	1.25	6	0.75	6	0.75	0	0	4	0.50	0	0	1	0.12	4	0.50	1	0.12	63	7.86	802
Iredell	6,245	41.26	3,424	22.62	2,509	16.58	1,181	7.80	639	4.22	426	2.81	153	1.01	92	0.61	37	0.24	31	0.20	27	0.18	16	0.11	22	0.15	12	0.08	9	0.06	312	2.06	15,135
Jackson	1,867	31.99	1,868	32.00	475	8.14	689	11.80	266	4.56	193	3.31	215	3.68	58	0.99	18	0.31	3	0.05	7	0.12	7	0.12	9	0.15	19	0.33	2	0.03	141	2.42	5,837
Johnston	8,061	44.38	4,347	23.93	2,447	13.47	1,491	8.21	586	3.23	389	2.14	88	0.48	104	0.57	29	0.16	29	0.16	27	0.15	17	0.09	15	0.08	22	0.12	14	0.08	497	2.74	18,163
Jones	820	61.84	184	13.88	181	13.65	28	2.11	15	1.13	9	0.68	11	0.83	9	0.68	3	0.23	3	0.23	6	0.45	1	0.08	0	0	5	0.38	2	0.15	49	3.70	1,326
Lee	2,520	44.74	1,233	21.89	955	16.95	333	5.91	170	3.02	169	3.00	53	0.94	35	0.62	5	0.09	12	0.21	7	0.12	9	0.16	4	0.07	7	0.12	4	0.07	117	2.08	5,633
Lenoir	3,539	53.40	1,201	18.12	1,024	15.45	228	3.44	79	1.19	112	1.69	45	0.68	28	0.42	15	0.23	18	0.27	28	0.42	16	0.24	9	0.14	14	0.21	3	0.05	268	4.04	6,627
Lincoln	2,896	46.66	1,244	20.04	1,040	16.76	373	6.01	207	3.33	140	2.26	71	1.14	36	0.58	21	0.34	9	0.14	8	0.13	10	0.16	5	0.08	8	0.13	2	0.03	137	2.21	6,207
Macon	1,445	39.82	739	20.36	460	12.68	304	8.38	172	4.74	158	4.35	205	5.65	30	0.83	7	0.19	10	0.28	5	0.14	0	0	5	0.14	7	0.19	2	0.06	80	2.20	3,629
Madison	1,066	27.40	1,295	33.29	314	8.07	481	12.37	109	2.80	166	4.27	154	3.96	54	1.39	18	0.46	9	0.23	10	0.26	9	0.23	7	0.18	5	0.13	1	0.03	192	4.94	3,890
Martin	2,132	60.53	441	12.52	400	11.36	131	3.72	37	1.05	70	1.99	33	0.94	22	0.62	6	0.17	7	0.20	9	0.26	7	0.20	5	0.14	6	0.17	2	0.06	214	6.08	3,522
McDowell	1,317	38.67	871	25.57	306	8.98	280	8.22	105	3.08	92	2.70	160	4.70	37	1.09	13	0.38	1	0.03	9	0.26	6	0.18	3	0.09	3	0.09	2	0.06	201	5.90	3,406
Mecklenburg	72,713	44.77	39,648	24.41	22,322	13.74	16,586	10.21	5,458	3.36	2,786	1.72	862	0.53	505	0.31	298	0.18	217	0.13	102	0.06	114	0.07	88	0.05	65	0.04	51	0.03	615	0.38	162,430
Mitchell	266	29.59	324	36.04	73	8.12	128	14.24	19	2.11	36	4.00	30	3.34	3	0.33	2	0.22	0	0	0	0	1	0.11	2	0.22	1	0.11	2	0.22	12	1.33	899
Montgomery	1,320	50.97	416	16.06	374	14.44	121	4.67	46	1.78	62	2.39	29	1.12	25	0.97	10	0.39	6	0.23	16	0.62	7	0.27	5	0.19	8	0.31	3	0.12	142	5.48	2,590
Moore	4,896	49.06	1,610	16.13	1,833	18.37	782	7.84	336	3.37	233	2.33	42	0.42	44	0.44	18	0.18	17	0.17	8	0.08	2	0.02	8	0.08	2	0.02	1	0.01	147	1.47	9,979
Nash	6,534	54.15	2,134	17.68	2,002	16.59	480	3.98	138	1.14	228	1.89	66	0.55	63	0.52	28	0.23	22	0.18	23	0.19	12	0.10	18	0.15	15	0.12	5	0.04	299	2.48	12,067
New Hanover	12,332	36.65	9,165	27.24	5,173	15.37	3,540	10.52	1,641	4.88	979	2.91	174	0.52	150	0.45	74	0.22	38	0.11	33	0.10	17	0.05	23	0.07	10	0.03	7	0.02	295	0.88	33,651
Northampton	2,656	58.70	499	11.03	505	11.16	126	2.78	46	1.02	83	1.83	23	0.51	89	1.97	20	0.44	18	0.40	32	0.71	11	0.24	12	0.27	9	0.20	8	0.18	388	8.57	4,525
Onslow	4,972	52.40	2,021	21.30	1,173	12.36	605	6.38	201	2.12	137	1.44	62	0.65	36	0.38	29	0.31	18	0.19	18	0.19	12	0.13	12	0.13	4	0.04	4	0.04	184	1.94	9,488
Orange	13,029	29.24	12,772	28.66	4,554	10.22	10,322	23.17	1,808	4.06	1,333	2.99	96	0.22	192	0.43	99	0.22	28	0.06	18	0.04	20	0.04	23	0.05	8	0.02	12	0.03	244	0.55	44,558
Pamlico	948	54.14	213	12.16	274	15.65	83	4.74	54	3.08	57	3.26	14	0.80	10	0.57	5	0.29	6	0.34	4	0.23	6	0.34	5	0.29	6	0.34	3	0.17	63	3.60	1,751
Pasquotank	2,415	56.57	663	15.53	628	14.71	183	4.29	89	2.08	96	2.25	23	0.54	18	0.42	9	0.21	20	0.47	7	0.16	6	0.14	4	0.09	1	0.02	0	0	107	2.51	4,269
Pender	2,513	45.72	1,191	21.67	861	15.66	392	7.13	221	4.02	139	2.53	41	0.75	31	0.56	7	0.13	5	0.09	14	0.25	6	0.11	5	0.09	2	0.04	5	0.09	64	1.16	5,497
Perquimans	594	45.27	175	13.34	262	19.97	58	4.42	31	2.36	54	4.12	12	0.91	18	1.37	4	0.30	1	0.08	5	0.38	3	0.23	4	0.30	20	1.52	2	0.15	69	5.26	1,312
Person	2,329	51.10	777	17.05	654	14.35	293	6.43	80	1.76	106	2.33	42	0.92	49	1.08	12	0.26	9	0.20	12	0.26	6	0.13	5	0.11	6	0.13	3	0.07	175	3.84	4,558
Pitt	10,329	48.14	5,105	23.79	2,639	12.30	1,554	7.24	602	2.81	454	2.12	117	0.55	92	0.43	47	0.22	38	0.18	31	0.14	27	0.13	25	0.12	8	0.04	13	0.06	376	1.75	21,457
Polk	1,066	41.85	521	20.46	299	11.74	284	11.15	132	5.18	106	4.16	96	3.77	17	0.67	3	0.12	2	0.08	2	0.08	3	0.12	2	0.08	5	0.20	0	0	9	0.35	2,547
Randolph	2,788	41.11	1,734	25.57	1,083	15.97	500	7.37	223	3.29	171	2.52	33	0.49	44	0.65	21	0.31	15	0.22	13	0.19	4	0.06	4	0.06	11	0.16	6	0.09	131	1.93	6,781
Richmond	2,654	53.79	701	14.21	693	14.05	175	3.55	72	1.46	85	1.72	59	1.20	44	0.89	20	0.41	18	0.36	15	0.30	14	0.28	10	0.20	15	0.30	3	0.06	356	7.22	4,934
Robeson	6,300	43.29	2,382	16.37	1,380	9.48	532	3.66	136	0.93	261	1.79	858	5.90	153	1.05	67	0.46	78	0.54	77	0.53	60	0.41	47	0.32	51	0.35	25	0.17	2,145	14.74	14,552
Rockingham	3,571	46.21	1,506	19.49	1,551	20.07	360	4.66	165	2.14	172	2.23	44	0.57	57	0.74	15	0.19	17	0.22	15	0.19	13	0.17	9	0.12	13	0.17	5	0.06	214	2.77	7,727
Rowan	4,799	46.14	2,393	23.01	1,507	14.49	662	6.37	298	2.87	226	2.17	102	0.98	59	0.57	26	0.25	27	0.26	21	0.20	14	0.13	11	0.11	13	0.13	11	0.11	231	2.22	10,400
Rutherford	2,153	47.01	1,146	25.02	403	8.80	276	6.03	98	2.14	105	2.29	200	4.37	37	0.81	11	0.24	3	0.07	9	0.20	6	0.13	8	0.17	5	0.11	1	0.02	119	2.60	4,580
Sampson	2,839	55.44	862	16.83	818	15.97	213	4.16	53	1.03	62	1.21	27	0.53	26	0.51	11	0.21	14	0.27	20	0.39	9	0.18	9	0.18	5	0.10	5	0.10	148	2.89	5,121
Scotland	2,075	55.16	529	14.06	330	8.77	155	4.12	65	1.73	95	2.53	212	5.64	43	1.14	13	0.35	17	0.45	8	0.21	5	0.13	7	0.19	11	0.29	4	0.11	193	5.13	3,762
Stanly	1,775	47.50	740	19.80	537	14.37	223	5.97	101	2.70	89	2.38	58	1.55	34	0.91	14	0.37	9	0.24	2	0.05	8	0.21	7	0.19	9	0.24	2	0.05	129	3.45	3,737
Stokes	1,213	40.22	681	22.58	533	17.67	174	5.77	92	3.05	74	2.45	38	1.26	21	0.70	4	0.13	5	0.17	6	0.20	6	0.20	4	0.13	3	0.10	2	0.07	160	5.31	3,016
Surry	1,949	41.60	1,021	21.79	827	17.65	305	6.51	119	2.54	147	3.14	42	0.90	37	0.79	14	0.30	8	0.17	14	0.30	5	0.11	5	0.11	12	0.26	6	0.13	174	3.71	4,685
Swain	554	34.69	470	29.43	161	10.08	111	6.95	64	4.01	58	3.63	82	5.13	21	1.31	5	0.31	3	0.19	2	0.13	4	0.25	1	0.06	4	0.25	2	0.13	55	3.44	1,597
Transylvania	1,890	35.83	1,288	24.42	552	10.46	692	13.12	298	5.65	304	5.76	148	2.81	33	0.63	7	0.13	0	0	6	0.11	1	0.02	5	0.09	2	0.04	0	0	49	0.93	5,275
Tyrrell	220	39.36	91	16.28	98	17.53	22	3.94	15	2.68	20	3.58	4	0.72	7	1.25	2	0.36	0	0	6	1.07	1	0.18	0	0	2	0.36	1	0.18	70	12.52	559
Union	9,117	44.44	4,587	22.36	3,069	14.96	1,767	8.61	844	4.11	506	2.47	157	0.77	103	0.50	42	0.20	31	0.15	24	0.12	20	0.10	19	0.09	11	0.05	10	0.05	207	1.01	20,514
Vance	3,348	59.20	794	14.04	768	13.58	217	3.84	58	1.03	87	1.54	36	0.64	46	0.81	12	0.21	21	0.37	20	0.35	11	0.19	11	0.19	7	0.12	8	0.14	211	3.73	5,655
Wake	79,007	40.53	50,919	26.12	23,544	12.08	27,837	14.28	6,821	3.50	3,759	1.93	505	0.26	812	0.42	403	0.21	175	0.09	121	0.06	89	0.05	85	0.04	35	0.02	51	0.03	763	0.39	194,926
Warren	2,211	57.49	548	14.25	480	12.48	132	3.43	46	1.20	68	1.77	22	0.57	38	0.99	10	0.26	20	0.52	12	0.31	12	0.31	14	0.36	43	1.12	6	0.16	184	4.78	3,846
Washington	1,079	55.82	292	15.11	269	13.92	56	2.90	13	0.67	43	2.22	38	1.97	12	0.62	6	0.31	4	0.21	4	0.21	4	0.21	6	0.31	6	0.31	3	0.16	98	5.07	1,933
Watauga	2,298	23.13	4,707	47.38	716	7.21	1,336	13.45	469	4.72	245	2.47	49	0.49	37	0.37	26	0.26	8	0.08	3	0.03	7	0.07	4	0.04	2	0.02	1	0.01	26	0.26	9,934
Wayne	5,781	49.69	2,340	20.11	1,672	14.37	493	4.24	207	1.78	198	1.70	115	0.99	76	0.65	32	0.28	55	0.47	39	0.34	18	0.15	29	0.25	12	0.10	11	0.09	556	4.78	11,634
Wilkes	1,787	45.02	873	22.00	634	15.97	247	6.22	87	2.19	84	2.12	22	0.55	18	0.45	6	0.15	7	0.18	7	0.18	7	0.18	3	0.08	3	0.08	4	0.10	180	4.54	3,969
Wilson	5,063	52.06	1,928	19.82	1,546	15.90	409	4.21	143	1.47	149	1.53	61	0.63	61	0.63	26	0.27	25	0.26	34	0.35	19	0.20	10	0.10	13	0.13	14	0.14	225	2.31	9,726
Yadkin	784	41.68	461	24.51	302	16.06	120	6.38	46	2.45	50	2.66	13	0.69	15	0.80	1	0.05	2	0.11	4	0.21	1	0.05	2	0.11	2	0.11	0	0	78	4.15	1,881
Yancey	848	34.77	709	29.07	206	8.45	318	13.04	79	3.24	79	3.24	76	3.12	27	1.11	3	0.12	2	0.08	4	0.16	4	0.16	2	0.08	5	0.21	0	0	77	3.16	2,439
Total	572,271	42.95	322,645	24.22	172,558	12.95	139,912	10.50	43,632	3.27	30,742	2.31	10,679	0.80	6,622	0.50	2,973	0.22	2,181	0.16	1,978	0.15	1,341	0.10	1,243	0.09	1,098	0.08	699	0.05	21,808	1.64	1,332,382

2020 Oklahoma Democratic presidential primary

Popular vote share by county Biden—<30% Biden—30–40% Biden—40–50%

2020 Oklahoma Democratic presidential primary
Candidate	Votes	%	Delegates
Joe Biden	117,633	38.66	21
Bernie Sanders	77,425	25.45	13
Michael Bloomberg	42,270	13.89	2
Elizabeth Warren	40,732	13.39	1
Amy Klobuchar (withdrawn) (Note: Candidate withdrew during absentee voting, shortly before the election.)	6,733	2.21	
Pete Buttigieg (withdrawn)	5,115	1.68	
Tulsi Gabbard	5,109	1.68	
Tom Steyer (withdrawn)	2,006	0.66	
Andrew Yang (withdrawn)	1,997	0.66	
Cory Booker (withdrawn)	1,530	0.50	
Michael Bennet (withdrawn)	1,273	0.42	
Marianne Williamson (withdrawn)	1,158	0.38	
Deval Patrick (withdrawn)	680	0.22	
Julian Castro (withdrawn)	620	0.20	
Total	304,281	100%	37

=== Results by county ===
2020 Oklahoma Democratic primary (results per county)
County	Joe Biden		Bernie Sanders		Michael Bloomberg		Elizabeth Warren		Amy Klobuchar		Pete Buttigieg		Tulsi Gabbard		Tom Steyer		Andrew Yang		Cory Booker		Michael Bennet		Marianne Williamson		Deval Patrick		Julian Castro		Total votes cast
County	Votes	%	Votes	%	Votes	%	Votes	%	Votes	%	Votes	%	Votes	%	Votes	%	Votes	%	Votes	%	Votes	%	Votes	%	Votes	%	Votes	%	Total votes cast
Adair	423	37.33	235	20.74	181	15.98	100	8.83	50	4.41	20	1.77	36	3.18	23	2.03	9	0.79	12	1.06	17	1.50	16	1.41	7	0.62	4	0.35	1,133
Alfalfa	73	36.14	31	15.35	46	22.77	24	11.88	7	3.47	6	2.97	4	1.98	1	0.50	2	0.99	5	2.48	0	0	2	0.99	1	0.50	0	0	202
Atoka	272	33.58	119	14.69	149	18.40	71	8.77	33	4.07	23	2.84	46	5.68	30	3.70	13	1.60	18	2.22	16	1.98	7	0.86	5	0.62	8	0.99	810
Beaver	42	35.59	13	11.02	25	21.19	12	10.17	4	3.39	6	5.08	5	4.24	2	1.69	0	0	3	2.54	1	0.85	2	1.69	2	1.69	1	0.85	118
Beckham	315	33.87	165	17.74	144	15.48	115	12.37	47	5.05	17	1.83	38	4.09	19	2.04	20	2.15	16	1.72	8	0.86	12	1.29	5	0.54	9	0.97	930
Blaine	222	37.69	98	16.64	116	19.69	63	10.70	24	4.07	16	2.72	22	3.74	7	1.19	5	0.85	3	0.51	3	0.51	6	1.02	1	0.17	3	0.51	589
Bryan	901	37.34	556	23.04	390	16.16	233	9.66	71	2.94	41	1.70	63	2.61	48	1.99	31	1.28	10	0.41	31	1.28	23	0.95	5	0.21	10	0.41	2,413
Caddo	777	36.67	434	20.48	367	17.32	202	9.53	101	4.77	43	2.03	57	2.69	34	1.60	29	1.37	14	0.66	16	0.76	19	0.90	17	0.80	9	0.42	2,119
Canadian	3,460	38.18	2,489	27.47	1,120	12.36	1,321	14.58	169	1.86	141	1.56	151	1.67	39	0.43	46	0.51	21	0.23	42	0.46	20	0.22	21	0.23	22	0.24	9,062
Carter	1,161	41.18	506	17.95	499	17.70	241	8.55	99	3.51	65	2.31	63	2.23	41	1.45	26	0.92	35	1.24	29	1.03	32	1.14	11	0.39	11	0.39	2,819
Cherokee	1,470	34.02	1,188	27.49	658	15.23	448	10.37	177	4.10	104	2.41	101	2.34	52	1.20	28	0.65	26	0.60	24	0.56	23	0.53	15	0.35	7	0.16	4,321
Choctaw	323	37.04	148	16.97	129	14.79	82	9.40	37	4.24	29	3.33	43	4.93	18	2.06	12	1.38	14	1.61	14	1.61	8	0.92	6	0.69	9	1.03	872
Cimarron	20	22.99	8	9.20	16	18.39	5	5.75	9	10.34	3	3.45	6	6.90	3	3.45	2	2.30	9	10.34	2	2.30	1	1.15	0	0	3	3.45	87
Cleveland	10,009	34.12	9,632	32.84	2,869	9.78	5,220	17.80	421	1.44	470	1.60	309	1.05	93	0.32	127	0.43	55	0.19	44	0.15	49	0.17	16	0.05	20	0.07	29,334
Coal	137	34.25	72	18.00	67	16.75	37	9.25	10	2.50	6	1.50	32	8.00	10	2.50	10	2.50	5	1.25	9	2.25	3	0.75	2	0.50	0	0	400
Comanche	2,999	46.07	1,602	24.61	844	12.97	551	8.47	101	1.55	104	1.60	81	1.24	48	0.74	47	0.72	30	0.46	21	0.32	39	0.60	27	0.41	15	0.23	6,509
Cotton	128	35.36	49	13.54	75	20.72	38	10.50	15	4.14	11	3.04	9	2.49	12	3.31	6	1.66	4	1.10	2	0.55	4	1.10	6	1.66	3	0.83	362
Craig	458	36.61	208	16.63	202	16.15	131	10.47	65	5.20	36	2.88	52	4.16	27	2.16	27	2.16	12	0.96	12	0.96	7	0.56	10	0.80	4	0.32	1,251
Creek	1,737	38.04	982	21.51	891	19.51	499	10.93	137	3.00	82	1.80	96	2.10	25	0.55	29	0.64	22	0.48	18	0.39	27	0.59	11	0.24	10	0.22	4,566
Custer	571	36.00	394	24.84	236	14.88	207	13.05	45	2.84	29	1.83	43	2.71	8	0.50	12	0.76	7	0.44	15	0.95	9	0.57	3	0.19	7	0.44	1,586
Delaware	1,110	44.10	378	15.02	492	19.55	209	8.30	96	3.81	51	2.03	60	2.38	28	1.11	26	1.03	13	0.52	20	0.79	12	0.48	13	0.52	9	0.36	2,517
Dewey	89	33.58	32	12.08	50	18.87	41	15.47	15	5.66	7	2.64	10	3.77	3	1.13	3	1.13	6	2.26	3	1.13	1	0.38	3	1.13	2	0.75	265
Ellis	55	30.22	23	12.64	31	17.03	34	18.68	7	3.85	6	3.30	11	6.04	6	3.30	0	0	1	0.55	1	0.55	4	2.20	2	1.10	1	0.55	182
Garfield	1,215	40.27	639	21.18	505	16.74	385	12.76	66	2.19	70	2.32	47	1.56	18	0.60	16	0.53	12	0.40	15	0.50	12	0.40	4	0.13	13	0.43	3,017
Garvin	635	37.27	290	17.02	292	17.14	198	11.62	89	5.22	39	2.29	49	2.88	23	1.35	22	1.29	15	0.88	19	1.12	12	0.70	9	0.53	12	0.70	1,704
Grady	1,229	38.38	625	19.52	475	14.83	423	13.21	121	3.78	71	2.22	81	2.53	37	1.16	33	1.03	26	0.81	22	0.69	31	0.97	13	0.41	15	0.47	3,202
Grant	98	42.61	37	16.09	34	14.78	28	12.17	12	5.22	5	2.17	4	1.74	5	2.17	0	0	2	0.87	0	0	3	1.30	2	0.87	0	0	230
Greer	129	33.77	72	18.85	52	13.61	47	12.30	18	4.71	14	3.66	18	4.71	10	2.62	6	1.57	4	1.05	4	1.05	3	0.79	1	0.26	4	1.05	382
Harmon	60	36.59	25	15.24	29	17.68	12	7.32	18	10.98	6	3.66	2	1.22	2	1.22	4	2.44	2	1.22	1	0.61	2	1.22	0	0	1	0.61	164
Harper	57	36.54	20	12.82	25	16.03	21	13.46	7	4.49	6	3.85	8	5.13	5	3.21	2	1.28	0	0	1	0.64	3	1.92	0	0	1	0.64	156
Haskell	355	38.84	133	14.55	157	17.18	66	7.22	48	5.25	24	2.63	34	3.72	20	2.19	29	3.17	11	1.20	10	1.09	8	0.88	13	1.42	6	0.66	914
Hughes	361	32.23	159	14.20	200	17.86	122	10.89	75	6.70	37	3.30	53	4.73	24	2.14	22	1.96	19	1.70	18	1.61	14	1.25	10	0.89	6	0.54	1,120
Jackson	395	45.30	176	20.18	106	12.16	71	8.14	20	2.29	25	2.87	22	2.52	11	1.26	9	1.03	12	1.38	6	0.69	7	0.80	4	0.46	8	0.92	872
Jefferson	148	37.95	45	11.54	64	16.41	44	11.28	26	6.67	8	2.05	13	3.33	10	2.56	3	0.77	5	1.28	8	2.05	7	1.79	3	0.77	6	1.54	390
Johnston	265	38.18	113	16.28	124	17.87	71	10.23	36	5.19	13	1.87	13	1.87	13	1.87	17	2.45	9	1.30	6	0.86	4	0.58	8	1.15	2	0.29	694
Kay	1,071	41.92	504	19.73	392	15.34	321	12.56	66	2.58	54	2.11	44	1.72	16	0.63	20	0.78	18	0.70	17	0.67	15	0.59	7	0.27	10	0.39	2,555
Kingfisher	206	32.19	129	20.16	121	18.91	86	13.44	32	5.00	16	2.50	18	2.81	7	1.09	8	1.25	6	0.94	3	0.47	4	0.63	3	0.47	1	0.16	640
Kiowa	248	42.25	73	12.44	118	20.10	64	10.90	21	3.58	16	2.73	18	3.07	5	0.85	3	0.51	6	1.02	8	1.36	2	0.34	2	0.34	3	0.51	587
Latimer	305	34.35	133	14.98	142	15.99	84	9.46	61	6.87	21	2.36	48	5.41	17	1.91	23	2.59	19	2.14	12	1.35	11	1.24	9	1.01	3	0.34	888
Le Flore	1,168	38.48	560	18.45	435	14.33	260	8.57	108	3.56	93	3.06	129	4.25	67	2.21	60	1.98	42	1.38	33	1.09	32	1.05	32	1.05	16	0.53	3,035
Lincoln	842	38.80	401	18.48	378	17.42	263	12.12	86	3.96	35	1.61	63	2.90	22	1.01	19	0.88	15	0.69	19	0.88	12	0.55	7	0.32	8	0.37	2,170
Logan	1,230	42.36	646	22.25	389	13.40	406	13.98	70	2.41	58	2.00	36	1.24	14	0.48	12	0.41	15	0.52	10	0.34	9	0.31	6	0.21	3	0.10	2,904
Love	209	35.19	112	18.86	103	17.34	58	9.76	23	3.87	13	2.19	28	4.71	16	2.69	17	2.86	2	0.34	4	0.67	5	0.84	4	0.67	0	0	594
Major	94	37.60	35	14.00	45	18.00	28	11.20	8	3.20	11	4.40	11	4.40	4	1.60	2	0.80	6	2.40	2	0.80	2	0.80	0	0	2	0.80	250
Marshall	332	37.09	141	15.75	184	20.56	85	9.50	28	3.13	32	3.58	25	2.79	12	1.34	7	0.78	17	1.90	12	1.34	11	1.23	3	0.34	6	0.67	895
Mayes	1,155	37.46	576	18.68	592	19.20	338	10.96	103	3.34	48	1.56	90	2.92	46	1.49	42	1.36	30	0.97	21	0.68	16	0.52	16	0.52	10	0.32	3,083
McClain	1,048	39.47	534	20.11	404	15.22	366	13.79	80	3.01	57	2.15	59	2.22	21	0.79	17	0.64	37	1.39	11	0.41	7	0.26	9	0.34	5	0.19	2,655
McCurtain	657	39.15	281	16.75	192	11.44	141	8.40	71	4.23	52	3.10	85	5.07	42	2.50	35	2.09	29	1.73	33	1.97	33	1.97	13	0.77	14	0.83	1,678
McIntosh	696	38.03	308	16.83	357	19.51	176	9.62	88	4.81	30	1.64	51	2.79	23	1.26	17	0.93	19	1.04	23	1.26	18	0.98	13	0.71	11	0.60	1,830
Murray	439	38.64	181	15.93	173	15.23	102	8.98	59	5.19	23	2.02	41	3.61	29	2.55	17	1.50	29	2.55	9	0.79	19	1.67	7	0.62	8	0.70	1,136
Muskogee	2,461	41.45	1,108	18.66	1,129	19.02	540	9.10	212	3.57	78	1.31	129	2.17	58	0.98	59	0.99	50	0.84	34	0.57	39	0.66	28	0.47	12	0.20	5,937
Noble	246	33.24	131	17.70	136	18.38	105	14.19	41	5.54	23	3.11	20	2.70	4	0.54	4	0.54	14	1.89	7	0.95	3	0.41	3	0.41	3	0.41	740
Nowata	218	33.23	104	15.85	137	20.88	93	14.18	39	5.95	13	1.98	19	2.90	9	1.37	7	1.07	5	0.76	7	1.07	2	0.30	2	0.30	1	0.15	656
Okfuskee	277	36.21	120	15.69	141	18.43	93	12.16	39	5.10	15	1.96	19	2.48	11	1.44	8	1.05	16	2.09	5	0.65	9	1.18	6	0.78	6	0.78	765
Oklahoma	31,394	41.34	21,130	27.82	8,443	11.12	11,432	15.05	832	1.10	1,026	1.35	675	0.89	167	0.22	298	0.39	166	0.22	145	0.19	117	0.15	53	0.07	69	0.09	75,947
Okmulgee	1,257	41.42	507	16.71	649	21.38	235	7.74	103	3.39	63	2.08	71	2.34	30	0.99	34	1.12	25	0.82	26	0.86	14	0.46	12	0.40	9	0.30	3,035
Osage	1,817	44.28	821	20.01	704	17.16	409	9.97	83	2.02	38	0.93	76	1.85	39	0.95	27	0.66	32	0.78	16	0.39	20	0.49	11	0.27	10	0.24	4,103
Ottawa	944	44.74	411	19.48	276	13.08	180	8.53	65	3.08	59	2.80	71	3.36	35	1.66	14	0.66	18	0.85	8	0.38	14	0.66	10	0.47	5	0.24	2,110
Pawnee	419	35.39	240	20.27	222	18.75	130	10.98	46	3.89	18	1.52	34	2.87	14	1.18	15	1.27	11	0.93	12	1.01	12	1.01	10	0.84	1	0.08	1,184
Payne	2,240	34.92	1,786	27.84	743	11.58	1,216	18.96	124	1.93	114	1.78	86	1.34	18	0.28	31	0.48	21	0.33	7	0.11	12	0.19	12	0.19	5	0.08	6,415
Pittsburg	1,344	36.45	703	19.07	597	16.19	355	9.63	219	5.94	75	2.03	145	3.93	39	1.06	51	1.38	50	1.36	33	0.90	39	1.06	16	0.43	21	0.57	3,687
Pontotoc	1,113	39.23	735	25.91	381	13.43	301	10.61	72	2.54	54	1.90	48	1.69	34	1.20	27	0.95	27	0.95	23	0.81	12	0.42	7	0.25	3	0.11	2,837
Pottawatomie	1,887	39.17	1,022	21.22	786	16.32	607	12.60	152	3.16	107	2.22	83	1.72	37	0.77	27	0.56	23	0.48	31	0.64	24	0.50	15	0.31	16	0.33	4,817
Pushmataha	253	31.98	119	15.04	145	18.33	87	11.00	57	7.21	20	2.53	37	4.68	22	2.78	8	1.01	10	1.26	10	1.26	11	1.39	5	0.63	7	0.88	791
Roger Mills	77	31.56	36	14.75	31	12.70	36	14.75	18	7.38	14	5.74	11	4.51	6	2.46	0	0	7	2.87	3	1.23	1	0.41	2	0.82	2	0.82	244
Rogers	2,168	36.13	1,362	22.70	1,070	17.83	740	12.33	193	3.22	125	2.08	120	2.00	52	0.87	62	1.03	34	0.57	20	0.33	31	0.52	10	0.17	13	0.22	6,000
Seminole	685	40.60	310	18.38	275	16.30	183	10.85	61	3.62	39	2.31	44	2.61	22	1.30	14	0.83	14	0.83	19	1.13	9	0.53	5	0.30	7	0.41	1,687
Sequoyah	1,023	39.90	431	16.81	455	17.75	211	8.23	106	4.13	49	1.91	93	3.63	60	2.34	31	1.21	19	0.74	39	1.52	23	0.90	10	0.39	14	0.55	2,564
Stephens	977	42.24	430	18.59	353	15.26	256	11.07	68	2.94	49	2.12	40	1.73	25	1.08	24	1.04	40	1.73	26	1.12	9	0.39	8	0.35	8	0.35	2,313
Texas	146	34.76	89	21.19	53	12.62	55	13.10	13	3.10	12	2.86	14	3.33	6	1.43	7	1.67	9	2.14	4	0.95	7	1.67	3	0.71	2	0.48	420
Tillman	179	44.20	56	13.83	71	17.53	30	7.41	17	4.20	15	3.70	13	3.21	5	1.23	5	1.23	5	1.23	3	0.74	2	0.49	3	0.74	1	0.25	405
Tulsa	21,099	36.89	17,233	30.13	8,070	14.11	8,086	14.14	673	1.18	710	1.24	627	1.10	128	0.22	216	0.38	115	0.20	83	0.15	80	0.14	35	0.06	34	0.06	57,189
Wagoner	1,998	39.38	1,164	22.95	896	17.66	526	10.37	136	2.68	91	1.79	114	2.25	38	0.75	32	0.63	31	0.61	14	0.28	9	0.18	12	0.24	12	0.24	5,073
Washington	1,385	41.79	711	21.45	520	15.69	415	12.52	78	2.35	65	1.96	52	1.57	21	0.63	18	0.54	12	0.36	10	0.30	15	0.45	3	0.09	9	0.27	3,314
Washita	216	31.91	120	17.73	110	16.25	85	12.56	54	7.98	21	3.10	18	2.66	14	2.07	3	0.44	14	2.07	5	0.74	6	0.89	5	0.74	6	0.89	677
Woods	142	33.97	72	17.22	77	18.42	66	15.79	24	5.74	13	3.11	7	1.67	4	0.96	0	0	6	1.44	2	0.48	4	0.96	0	0	1	0.24	418
Woodward	269	35.35	164	21.55	115	15.11	110	14.45	28	3.68	16	2.10	15	1.97	12	1.58	3	0.39	8	1.05	6	0.79	6	0.79	7	0.92	2	0.26	761
Total	117,633	38.66	77,425	25.45	42,270	13.89	40,732	13.39	6,733	2.21	5,115	1.68	5,109	1.68	2,006	0.66	1,997	0.66	1,530	0.50	1,273	0.42	1,158	0.38	680	0.22	620	0.20	304,281

2020 Tennessee Democratic presidential primary

Popular vote share by county Biden—30–40% Biden—40–50% Biden—50–60% Biden—60–70% Sanders—30–40%

2020 Tennessee Democratic presidential primary
Candidate	Votes	%	Delegates
Joe Biden	215,390	41.72	36 (Note: 33 delegates, if Bloomberg's statewide delegates would have been calculated.)
Bernie Sanders	129,168	25.02	22 (Note: 20 delegates, if Bloomberg's statewide delegates would have been calculated.)
Michael Bloomberg	79,789	15.46	5 (Note: 10 delegates, if Bloomberg's statewide delegates would have been calculated.)
Elizabeth Warren	53,732	10.41	1
Pete Buttigieg (withdrawn) (Note: Candidate withdrew shortly before the primary, after early voting started.)	17,102	3.31	
Amy Klobuchar (withdrawn)	10,671	2.07	
Tulsi Gabbard	2,278	0.44	
Tom Steyer (withdrawn)	1,932	0.37	
Michael Bennet (withdrawn)	1,650	0.32	
Andrew Yang (withdrawn)	1,097	0.21	
Cory Booker (withdrawn)	953	0.18	
Marianne Williamson (withdrawn)	498	0.10	
John Delaney (withdrawn)	378	0.07	
Julian Castro (withdrawn)	239	0.05	
Deval Patrick (withdrawn)	182	0.04	
Uncommitted	1,191	0.23	
Total	516,250	100%	64

=== Results by county ===
2020 Tennessee Democratic primary (results per county)
County	Joe Biden		Bernie Sanders		Michael Bloomberg		Elizabeth Warren		Pete Buttigieg		Amy Klobuchar		Tulsi Gabbard		Tom Steyer		Michael Bennet		Andrew Yang		Cory Booker		Marianne Williamson		John Delaney		Julian Castro		Deval Patrick		Uncommitted		Total votes cast
County	Votes	%	Votes	%	Votes	%	Votes	%	Votes	%	Votes	%	Votes	%	Votes	%	Votes	%	Votes	%	Votes	%	Votes	%	Votes	%	Votes	%	Votes	%	Votes	%	Total votes cast
Anderson	2,222	36.50	1,701	27.94	886	14.55	703	11.55	250	4.11	209	3.43	35	0.57	25	0.41	19	0.31	15	0.25	7	0.11	2	0.03	0	0.00	2	0.03	1	0.02	11	0.18	6,088
Bedford	799	43.33	446	24.19	284	15.40	130	7.05	60	3.25	65	3.52	15	0.81	18	0.98	8	0.43	5	0.27	5	0.27	2	0.11	3	0.16	1	0.05	2	0.11	1	0.05	1,844
Benton	402	49.26	160	19.61	129	15.81	41	5.02	39	4.78	21	2.57	3	0.37	10	1.23	4	0.49	3	0.37	0	0.00	2	0.25	1	0.12	0	0.00	0	0.00	1	0.12	816
Bledsoe	311	53.81	102	17.65	85	14.71	27	4.67	17	2.94	17	2.94	5	0.87	0	0.00	2	0.35	5	0.87	1	0.17	0	0.00	0	0.00	0	0.00	1	0.17	5	0.87	578
Blount	3,170	38.01	2,242	26.89	1,295	15.53	865	10.37	391	4.69	257	3.08	45	0.54	20	0.24	11	0.13	13	0.16	9	0.11	5	0.06	2	0.02	3	0.04	1	0.01	10	0.12	8,339
Bradley	1,762	39.21	1,239	27.57	706	15.71	360	8.01	174	3.87	155	3.45	29	0.65	19	0.42	8	0.18	12	0.27	11	0.24	1	0.02	4	0.09	2	0.04	0	0.00	12	0.27	4,494
Campbell	525	46.83	257	22.93	205	18.29	83	7.40	15	1.34	13	1.16	3	0.27	3	0.27	3	0.27	3	0.27	4	0.36	0	0.00	2	0.18	1	0.09	1	0.09	3	0.27	1,121
Cannon	281	41.69	182	27.00	105	15.58	55	8.16	18	2.67	20	2.97	5	0.74	3	0.45	2	0.30	1	0.15	0	0.00	0	0.00	0	0.00	0	0.00	1	0.15	1	0.15	674
Carroll	548	52.14	220	20.93	162	15.41	49	4.66	28	2.66	16	1.52	2	0.19	7	0.67	10	0.95	1	0.10	2	0.19	1	0.10	1	0.10	2	0.19	0	0.00	2	0.19	1,051
Carter	823	35.66	766	33.19	344	14.90	219	9.49	72	3.12	36	1.56	13	0.56	9	0.39	4	0.17	5	0.22	1	0.04	0	0.00	7	0.30	1	0.04	1	0.04	7	0.30	2,308
Cheatham	882	32.96	761	28.44	495	18.50	304	11.36	120	4.48	70	2.62	14	0.52	13	0.49	5	0.19	2	0.07	4	0.15	2	0.07	2	0.07	1	0.04	0	0.00	1	0.04	2,676
Chester	297	49.83	139	23.32	64	10.74	53	8.89	13	2.18	12	2.01	4	0.67	6	1.01	3	0.50	2	0.34	0	0.00	1	0.17	1	0.17	0	0.00	1	0.17	0	0.00	596
Claiborne	444	42.90	272	26.28	166	16.04	67	6.47	24	2.32	35	3.38	6	0.58	6	0.58	3	0.29	2	0.19	1	0.10	2	0.19	1	0.10	0	0.00	0	0.00	6	0.58	1,035
Clay	149	44.48	77	22.99	65	19.40	16	4.78	8	2.39	11	3.28	1	0.30	2	0.60	2	0.60	0	0.00	1	0.30	0	0.00	1	0.30	1	0.30	0	0.00	1	0.30	335
Cocke	446	38.55	324	28.00	209	18.06	75	6.48	43	3.72	38	3.28	2	0.17	6	0.52	2	0.17	2	0.17	4	0.35	1	0.09	3	0.26	0	0.00	1	0.09	1	0.09	1,157
Coffee	1,124	40.78	672	24.38	473	17.16	196	7.11	116	4.21	83	3.01	15	0.54	14	0.51	9	0.33	14	0.51	8	0.29	12	0.44	1	0.04	5	0.18	1	0.04	13	0.47	2,756
Crockett	348	61.27	83	14.61	74	13.03	17	2.99	12	2.11	10	1.76	5	0.88	5	0.88	5	0.88	2	0.35	3	0.53	0	0.00	1	0.18	1	0.18	1	0.18	1	0.18	568
Cumberland	1,423	43.27	614	18.67	643	19.55	258	7.84	132	4.01	134	4.07	10	0.30	23	0.70	13	0.40	8	0.24	6	0.18	5	0.15	2	0.06	2	0.06	0	0.00	16	0.49	3,289
Davidson	32,882	35.35	25,730	27.66	12,164	13.08	14,813	15.92	3,797	4.08	1,795	1.93	378	0.41	331	0.36	136	0.15	261	0.28	118	0.13	248	0.27	24	0.03	38	0.04	19	0.02	285	0.31	93,019
Decatur	231	48.94	89	18.86	91	19.28	19	4.03	9	1.91	8	1.69	7	1.48	4	0.85	2	0.42	0	0.00	4	0.85	0	0.00	2	0.42	1	0.21	0	0.00	5	1.06	472
DeKalb	447	45.89	203	20.84	165	16.94	74	7.60	24	2.46	27	2.77	6	0.62	12	1.23	4	0.41	1	0.10	3	0.31	2	0.21	2	0.21	1	0.10	0	0.00	3	0.31	974
Dickson	1,195	42.38	703	24.93	462	16.38	262	9.29	81	2.87	52	1.84	12	0.43	16	0.57	10	0.35	10	0.35	2	0.07	1	0.04	3	0.11	1	0.04	1	0.04	9	0.32	2,820
Dyer	647	51.23	231	18.29	259	20.51	65	5.15	22	1.74	18	1.43	3	0.24	3	0.24	6	0.48	1	0.08	1	0.08	0	0.00	1	0.08	0	0.00	4	0.32	2	0.16	1,263
Fayette	1,534	56.58	427	15.75	482	17.78	119	4.39	49	1.81	29	1.07	13	0.48	6	0.22	17	0.63	2	0.07	12	0.44	2	0.07	10	0.37	4	0.15	3	0.11	2	0.07	2,711
Fentress	226	40.29	130	23.17	105	18.72	50	8.91	16	2.85	17	3.03	3	0.53	5	0.89	2	0.36	1	0.18	2	0.36	0	0.00	1	0.18	0	0.00	0	0.00	3	0.53	561
Franklin	1,225	44.38	587	21.27	435	15.76	326	11.81	70	2.54	63	2.28	7	0.25	14	0.51	6	0.22	2	0.07	8	0.29	2	0.07	0	0.00	4	0.14	2	0.07	9	0.33	2,760
Gibson	1,272	59.44	356	16.64	292	13.64	82	3.83	48	2.24	26	1.21	11	0.51	13	0.61	18	0.84	4	0.19	8	0.37	1	0.05	3	0.14	1	0.05	1	0.05	4	0.19	2,140
Giles	729	50.87	287	20.03	250	17.45	77	5.37	43	3.00	23	1.61	4	0.28	6	0.42	4	0.28	0	0.00	5	0.35	0	0.00	3	0.21	0	0.00	0	0.00	2	0.14	1,433
Grainger	268	41.68	157	24.42	117	18.20	48	7.47	19	2.95	13	2.02	3	0.47	6	0.93	3	0.47	0	0.00	0	0.00	1	0.16	1	0.16	0	0.00	0	0.00	7	1.09	643
Greene	1,118	41.48	700	25.97	372	13.80	241	8.94	102	3.78	70	2.60	23	0.85	26	0.96	7	0.26	11	0.41	3	0.11	12	0.45	1	0.04	2	0.07	2	0.07	5	0.19	2,695
Grundy	265	41.80	116	18.30	126	19.87	55	8.68	19	3.00	8	1.26	2	0.32	8	1.26	5	0.79	2	0.32	1	0.16	1	0.16	3	0.47	2	0.32	1	0.16	20	3.15	634
Hamblen	994	42.41	676	28.84	345	14.72	144	6.14	72	3.07	60	2.56	11	0.47	6	0.26	10	0.43	4	0.17	8	0.34	2	0.09	7	0.30	1	0.04	0	0.00	4	0.17	2,344
Hamilton	16,296	43.88	9,428	25.39	5,556	14.96	3,640	9.80	1,076	2.90	624	1.68	144	0.39	110	0.30	62	0.17	78	0.21	38	0.10	16	0.04	7	0.02	7	0.02	7	0.02	48	0.13	37,137
Hancock	68	46.58	38	26.03	27	18.49	3	2.05	5	3.42	3	2.05	1	0.68	0	0.00	1	0.68	0	0.00	0	0.00	0	0.00	0	0.00	0	0.00	0	0.00	0	0.00	146
Hardeman	1,103	61.97	202	11.35	342	19.21	44	2.47	13	0.73	10	0.56	4	0.22	9	0.51	26	1.46	4	0.22	3	0.17	6	0.34	4	0.22	0	0.00	1	0.06	9	0.51	1,780
Hardin	520	58.30	153	17.15	107	12.00	45	5.04	19	2.13	22	2.47	5	0.56	9	1.01	1	0.11	4	0.45	2	0.22	1	0.11	0	0.00	0	0.00	0	0.00	4	0.45	892
Hawkins	865	46.51	481	25.86	281	15.11	104	5.59	45	2.42	32	1.72	8	0.43	12	0.65	4	0.22	7	0.38	3	0.16	2	0.11	3	0.16	2	0.11	1	0.05	10	0.54	1,860
Haywood	848	58.24	152	10.44	363	24.93	42	2.88	11	0.76	15	1.03	1	0.07	5	0.34	11	0.76	1	0.07	3	0.21	1	0.07	1	0.07	1	0.07	1	0.07	0	0.00	1,456
Henderson	395	56.11	157	22.30	79	11.22	27	3.84	14	1.99	17	2.41	4	0.57	1	0.14	5	0.71	1	0.14	0	0.00	0	0.00	0	0.00	1	0.14	0	0.00	3	0.43	704
Henry	768	44.50	329	19.06	361	20.92	111	6.43	65	3.77	44	2.55	8	0.46	10	0.58	9	0.52	3	0.17	9	0.52	1	0.06	1	0.06	3	0.17	1	0.06	3	0.17	1,726
Hickman	417	40.96	257	25.25	170	16.70	84	8.25	40	3.93	27	2.65	3	0.29	5	0.49	3	0.29	4	0.39	1	0.10	2	0.20	1	0.10	0	0.00	0	0.00	4	0.39	1,018
Houston	197	48.88	82	20.35	60	14.89	28	6.95	18	4.47	4	0.99	2	0.50	1	0.25	1	0.25	0	0.00	2	0.50	2	0.50	1	0.25	0	0.00	0	0.00	5	1.24	403
Humphreys	455	42.72	239	22.44	220	20.66	56	5.26	33	3.10	30	2.82	6	0.56	9	0.85	4	0.38	2	0.19	4	0.38	0	0.00	0	0.00	0	0.00	1	0.09	6	0.56	1,065
Jackson	234	43.98	139	26.13	76	14.29	34	6.39	22	4.14	11	2.07	4	0.75	5	0.94	1	0.19	2	0.38	1	0.19	0	0.00	1	0.19	0	0.00	0	0.00	2	0.38	532
Jefferson	862	41.38	546	26.21	352	16.90	186	8.93	59	2.83	43	2.06	7	0.34	7	0.34	2	0.10	6	0.29	4	0.19	2	0.10	2	0.10	0	0.00	0	0.00	5	0.24	2,083
Johnson	226	37.17	177	29.11	89	14.64	46	7.57	35	5.76	22	3.62	3	0.49	4	0.66	2	0.33	1	0.16	0	0.00	0	0.00	2	0.33	0	0.00	1	0.16	0	0.00	608
Knox	14,885	32.07	14,722	31.72	6,512	14.03	6,245	13.45	2,044	4.40	1,256	2.71	223	0.48	123	0.27	95	0.20	107	0.23	54	0.12	20	0.04	25	0.05	10	0.02	9	0.02	84	0.18	46,414
Lake	133	54.29	51	20.82	39	15.92	8	3.27	2	0.82	2	0.82	0	0.00	0	0.00	7	2.86	1	0.41	1	0.41	0	0.00	0	0.00	1	0.41	0	0.00	0	0.00	245
Lauderdale	727	55.88	223	17.14	245	18.83	36	2.77	15	1.15	13	1.00	5	0.38	8	0.61	10	0.77	6	0.46	3	0.23	0	0.00	3	0.23	0	0.00	2	0.15	5	0.38	1,301
Lawrence	803	48.67	379	22.97	272	16.48	89	5.39	25	1.52	39	2.36	11	0.67	10	0.61	8	0.48	1	0.06	2	0.12	1	0.06	2	0.12	1	0.06	1	0.06	6	0.36	1,650
Lewis	169	32.13	192	36.50	83	15.78	43	8.17	17	3.23	10	1.90	6	1.14	0	0.00	3	0.57	0	0.00	0	0.00	0	0.00	2	0.38	0	0.00	0	0.00	1	0.19	526
Lincoln	648	46.85	287	20.75	227	16.41	112	8.10	32	2.31	28	2.02	8	0.58	11	0.80	6	0.43	2	0.14	4	0.29	9	0.65	0	0.00	3	0.22	0	0.00	6	0.43	1,383
Loudon	1,295	38.78	640	19.17	746	22.34	244	7.31	179	5.36	178	5.33	11	0.33	14	0.42	9	0.27	5	0.15	4	0.12	3	0.09	3	0.09	3	0.09	0	0.00	5	0.15	3,339
Macon	209	36.73	161	28.30	128	22.50	26	4.57	24	4.22	9	1.58	2	0.35	2	0.35	4	0.70	1	0.18	0	0.00	0	0.00	1	0.18	1	0.18	0	0.00	1	0.18	569
Madison	4,063	58.06	1,121	16.02	1,003	14.33	416	5.94	128	1.83	115	1.64	16	0.23	39	0.56	30	0.43	10	0.14	19	0.27	7	0.10	9	0.13	1	0.01	4	0.06	17	0.24	6,998
Marion	1,027	42.49	420	17.38	441	18.25	158	6.54	76	3.14	62	2.57	67	2.77	23	0.95	24	0.99	13	0.54	13	0.54	3	0.12	19	0.79	4	0.17	2	0.08	65	2.69	2,417
Marshall	683	43.53	385	24.54	256	16.32	126	8.03	47	3.00	35	2.23	7	0.45	9	0.57	2	0.13	4	0.25	5	0.32	3	0.19	2	0.13	0	0.00	2	0.13	3	0.19	1,569
Maury	2,517	43.61	1,478	25.61	844	14.62	485	8.40	216	3.74	134	2.32	25	0.43	16	0.28	10	0.17	12	0.21	8	0.14	2	0.03	1	0.02	2	0.03	4	0.07	18	0.31	5,772
McMinn	953	44.49	453	21.15	361	16.85	160	7.47	73	3.41	55	2.57	15	0.70	28	1.31	11	0.51	6	0.28	4	0.19	1	0.05	1	0.05	3	0.14	5	0.23	13	0.61	2,142
McNairy	573	60.00	153	16.02	139	14.55	34	3.56	16	1.68	10	1.05	4	0.42	3	0.31	6	0.63	5	0.52	4	0.42	3	0.31	2	0.21	0	0.00	0	0.00	3	0.31	955
Meigs	258	47.78	101	18.70	101	18.70	25	4.63	13	2.41	21	3.89	5	0.93	4	0.74	2	0.37	0	0.00	4	0.74	0	0.00	2	0.37	0	0.00	0	0.00	4	0.74	540
Monroe	867	45.63	403	21.21	386	20.32	104	5.47	59	3.11	50	2.63	6	0.32	7	0.37	1	0.05	3	0.16	1	0.05	1	0.05	1	0.05	1	0.05	1	0.05	9	0.47	1,900
Montgomery	5,351	43.12	3,406	27.45	1,711	13.79	1,024	8.25	373	3.01	236	1.90	67	0.54	57	0.46	52	0.42	44	0.35	29	0.23	5	0.04	17	0.14	16	0.13	8	0.06	14	0.11	12,410
Moore	138	46.00	51	17.00	60	20.00	24	8.00	12	4.00	5	1.67	2	0.67	2	0.67	1	0.33	0	0.00	0	0.00	2	0.67	1	0.33	0	0.00	0	0.00	2	0.67	300
Morgan	236	36.82	165	25.74	124	19.34	56	8.74	22	3.43	11	1.72	6	0.94	7	1.09	7	1.09	1	0.16	0	0.00	0	0.00	1	0.16	0	0.00	1	0.16	4	0.62	641
Obion	580	53.95	202	18.79	145	13.49	54	5.02	36	3.35	24	2.23	6	0.56	7	0.65	5	0.47	4	0.37	4	0.37	0	0.00	2	0.19	2	0.19	1	0.09	3	0.28	1,075
Overton	512	42.14	281	23.13	248	20.41	61	5.02	31	2.55	26	2.14	8	0.66	10	0.82	10	0.82	4	0.33	9	0.74	4	0.33	1	0.08	2	0.16	1	0.08	7	0.58	1,215
Perry	135	43.83	75	24.35	55	17.86	16	5.19	12	3.90	6	1.95	4	1.30	3	0.97	0	0.00	0	0.00	1	0.32	0	0.00	1	0.32	0	0.00	0	0.00	0	0.00	308
Pickett	132	47.14	48	17.14	66	23.57	12	4.29	8	2.86	12	4.29	0	0.00	2	0.71	0	0.00	0	0.00	0	0.00	0	0.00	0	0.00	0	0.00	0	0.00	0	0.00	280
Polk	467	44.39	222	21.10	176	16.73	47	4.47	27	2.57	43	4.09	11	1.05	8	0.76	5	0.48	2	0.19	1	0.10	2	0.19	1	0.10	0	0.00	2	0.19	38	3.61	1,052
Putnam	1,361	30.87	1,509	34.23	632	14.33	422	9.57	224	5.08	156	3.54	27	0.61	29	0.66	9	0.20	12	0.27	11	0.25	0	0.00	1	0.02	2	0.05	3	0.07	11	0.25	4,409
Rhea	541	46.52	266	22.87	210	18.06	72	6.19	26	2.24	15	1.29	10	0.86	7	0.60	4	0.34	2	0.17	1	0.09	1	0.09	0	0.00	1	0.09	0	0.00	7	0.60	1,163
Roane	1,297	40.93	743	23.45	559	17.64	244	7.70	145	4.58	117	3.69	23	0.73	11	0.35	6	0.19	5	0.16	2	0.06	2	0.06	5	0.16	1	0.03	2	0.06	7	0.22	3,169
Robertson	1,621	43.31	859	22.95	652	17.42	298	7.96	116	3.10	98	2.62	26	0.69	25	0.67	12	0.32	8	0.21	6	0.16	1	0.03	5	0.13	3	0.08	1	0.03	12	0.32	3,743
Rutherford	9,112	37.95	7,803	32.50	2,832	11.79	2,516	10.48	878	3.66	445	1.85	120	0.50	75	0.31	49	0.20	75	0.31	48	0.20	10	0.04	10	0.04	15	0.06	3	0.01	21	0.09	24,012
Scott	192	46.60	108	26.21	61	14.81	25	6.07	7	1.70	7	1.70	4	0.97	3	0.73	1	0.24	0	0.00	1	0.24	1	0.24	0	0.00	0	0.00	0	0.00	2	0.49	412
Sequatchie	270	40.30	161	24.03	131	19.55	50	7.46	26	3.88	24	3.58	4	0.60	1	0.15	1	0.15	1	0.15	0	0.00	0	0.00	0	0.00	0	0.00	1	0.15	0	0.00	670
Sevier	1,536	39.51	1,149	29.55	588	15.12	309	7.95	153	3.94	83	2.13	23	0.59	12	0.31	4	0.10	7	0.18	2	0.05	5	0.13	3	0.08	2	0.05	3	0.08	9	0.23	3,888
Shelby	50,280	49.20	20,492	20.05	18,185	17.79	8,465	8.28	1,748	1.71	1,123	1.10	229	0.22	280	0.27	623	0.61	127	0.12	311	0.30	28	0.03	100	0.10	50	0.05	54	0.05	108	0.11	102,203
Smith	391	35.38	239	21.63	291	26.33	73	6.61	34	3.08	28	2.53	3	0.27	7	0.63	10	0.90	6	0.54	5	0.45	1	0.09	2	0.18	1	0.09	0	0.00	14	1.27	1,105
Stewart	279	41.64	148	22.09	133	19.85	43	6.42	21	3.13	24	3.58	3	0.45	3	0.45	5	0.75	4	0.60	3	0.45	0	0.00	0	0.00	1	0.15	0	0.00	3	0.45	670
Sullivan	3,147	41.09	2,252	29.41	1,017	13.28	660	8.62	268	3.50	191	2.49	43	0.56	29	0.38	17	0.22	12	0.16	2	0.03	6	0.08	3	0.04	1	0.01	2	0.03	8	0.10	7,658
Sumner	4,997	42.96	2,879	24.75	1,708	14.68	1,201	10.33	402	3.46	234	2.01	72	0.62	44	0.38	27	0.23	16	0.14	19	0.16	8	0.07	4	0.03	7	0.06	4	0.03	9	0.08	11,631
Tipton	1,144	47.35	517	21.40	460	19.04	174	7.20	44	1.82	30	1.24	13	0.54	9	0.37	8	0.33	3	0.12	3	0.12	0	0.00	6	0.25	1	0.04	1	0.04	3	0.12	2,416
Trousdale	182	43.13	81	19.19	111	26.30	21	4.98	13	3.08	9	2.13	1	0.24	2	0.47	1	0.24	0	0.00	1	0.24	0	0.00	0	0.00	0	0.00	0	0.00	0	0.00	422
Unicoi	265	34.06	283	36.38	117	15.04	56	7.20	22	2.83	23	2.96	5	0.64	2	0.26	1	0.13	1	0.13	1	0.13	0	0.00	0	0.00	0	0.00	0	0.00	2	0.26	778
Union	289	47.53	159	26.15	103	16.94	25	4.11	8	1.32	4	0.66	6	0.99	7	1.15	1	0.16	3	0.49	0	0.00	0	0.00	0	0.00	0	0.00	0	0.00	3	0.49	608
Van Buren	132	42.17	58	18.53	69	22.04	24	7.67	9	2.88	8	2.56	1	0.32	2	0.64	3	0.96	0	0.00	3	0.96	0	0.00	1	0.32	0	0.00	0	0.00	3	0.96	313
Warren	817	38.59	506	23.90	412	19.46	157	7.42	71	3.35	59	2.79	22	1.04	19	0.90	16	0.76	5	0.24	11	0.52	1	0.05	5	0.24	3	0.14	1	0.05	12	0.57	2,117
Washington	2,828	32.87	3,096	35.98	1,039	12.08	934	10.86	370	4.30	221	2.57	36	0.42	31	0.36	13	0.15	12	0.14	7	0.08	2	0.02	4	0.05	2	0.02	0	0.00	9	0.10	8,604
Wayne	155	46.97	58	17.58	62	18.79	22	6.67	17	5.15	4	1.21	0	0.00	3	0.91	1	0.30	0	0.00	2	0.61	2	0.61	0	0.00	1	0.30	0	0.00	3	0.91	330
Weakley	624	44.13	323	22.84	192	13.58	138	9.76	42	2.97	45	3.18	10	0.71	6	0.42	10	0.71	2	0.14	2	0.14	2	0.14	1	0.07	0	0.00	1	0.07	16	1.13	1,414
White	481	42.05	274	23.95	205	17.92	67	5.86	41	3.58	24	2.10	11	0.96	10	0.87	1	0.09	4	0.35	1	0.09	1	0.09	2	0.17	0	0.00	1	0.09	21	1.84	1,144
Williamson	10,441	43.48	4,671	19.45	3,932	16.37	2,881	12.00	1,086	4.52	709	2.95	133	0.55	50	0.21	28	0.12	33	0.14	19	0.08	9	0.04	6	0.02	4	0.02	3	0.01	11	0.05	24,016
Wilson	3,404	38.90	1,886	21.55	1,582	18.08	907	10.37	486	5.55	295	3.37	43	0.49	40	0.46	16	0.18	21	0.24	10	0.11	11	0.13	7	0.08	3	0.03	1	0.01	38	0.43	8,750
Total	215,390	41.72	129,168	25.02	79,789	15.46	53,732	10.41	17,102	3.31	10,671	2.07	2,278	0.44	1,932	0.37	1,650	0.32	1,097	0.21	953	0.18	498	0.10	378	0.07	239	0.05	182	0.04	1,191	0.23	516,250

2020 Texas Democratic presidential primary

Popular vote share by county: Biden—<30% Biden—30–40% Biden—40–50% Biden—50–60% Biden—60–70% Bloomberg—<30% Bloomberg—30–40% Bloomberg—50–60% / Sanders—<30% Sanders—30–40% Sanders—40–50% Sanders—50–60% Warren—<30% Tie

2020 Texas Democratic presidential primary
Candidate	Votes	%	Delegates
Joe Biden	725,562	34.64	113
Bernie Sanders	626,339	29.91	99
Michael Bloomberg	300,608	14.35	11
Elizabeth Warren	239,237	11.42	5
Pete Buttigieg (withdrawn) (Note: Candidate withdrew shortly before the primary after early voting had already started.)	82,671	3.95	
Amy Klobuchar (withdrawn)	43,291	2.07	
Julian Castro (withdrawn)	16,688	0.80	
Tom Steyer (withdrawn)	13,929	0.67	
Michael Bennet (withdrawn)	10,324	0.49	
Tulsi Gabbard	8,688	0.41	
Andrew Yang (withdrawn)	6,674	0.32	
Cory Booker (withdrawn)	4,941	0.24	
Marianne Williamson (withdrawn)	3,918	0.19	
John Delaney (withdrawn)	3,280	0.16	
Deval Patrick (withdrawn)	1,304	0.06	
Other candidates	6,974	0.33	
Total	2,094,428	100%	228

2020 Utah Democratic presidential primary

Results by county Sanders—<30% Sanders—30–40% Sanders—40–50% Biden—30–40% Bloomberg—<30% Tie—20—30%

2020 Utah Democratic presidential primary
Candidate	Votes	%	Delegates
Bernie Sanders	79,728	36.14	16 (Note: 13 delegates, if Warren's and Bloomberg's statewide delegates would have been calculated.)
Joe Biden	40,674	18.44	7 (Note: 6 delegates, if Warren's and Bloomberg's statewide delegates would have been calculated.)
Elizabeth Warren	35,727	16.20	3 (Note: 5 delegates, if Warren's and Bloomberg's statewide delegates would have been calculated.)
Michael Bloomberg	33,991	15.41	3 (Note: 5 delegates, if Warren's and Bloomberg's statewide delegates would have been calculated.)
Pete Buttigieg (withdrawn) (Note: Candidate withdrew shortly before the primary after all-mail voting had started.)	18,734	8.49	
Amy Klobuchar (withdrawn)	7,603	3.45	
Tulsi Gabbard	1,704	0.77	
Andrew Yang (withdrawn)	950	0.43	
Tom Steyer (withdrawn)	703	0.32	
Marianne Williamson (withdrawn)	220	0.10	
Julian Castro (withdrawn)	159	0.07	
Cory Booker (withdrawn)	138	0.06	
Deval Patrick (withdrawn)	55	0.02	
Other candidates	196	0.09	
Total	220,582	100%	29

=== Results by county ===
2020 Utah Democratic primary (results per county)
County	Bernie Sanders		Joe Biden		Elizabeth Warren		Michael Bloomberg		Pete Buttigieg		Amy Klobuchar		Tulsi Gabbard		Andrew Yang		Tom Steyer		Marianne Williamson		Julian Castro		Cory Booker		Roque De La Fuente III		Nathan Bloxham		Deval Patrick		Total votes cast
County	Votes	%	Votes	%	Votes	%	Votes	%	Votes	%	Votes	%	Votes	%	Votes	%	Votes	%	Votes	%	Votes	%	Votes	%	Votes	%	Votes	%	Votes	%	Total votes cast
Beaver	28	18.54	39	25.83	14	9.27	43	28.48	15	9.93	10	6.62	0	0.00	0	0.00	2	1.32	0	0.00	0	0.00	0	0.00	0	0.00	0	0.00	0	0.00	151
Box Elder	403	28.36	309	21.75	166	11.68	299	21.04	141	9.92	51	3.59	18	1.27	12	0.84	14	0.99	2	0.14	3	0.21	0	0.00	2	0.14	1	0.07	0	0.00	1,421
Cache	2,131	38.78	874	15.91	1,064	19.36	612	11.14	425	7.73	271	4.93	49	0.89	32	0.58	18	0.33	7	0.13	1	0.02	6	0.11	4	0.07	1	0.02	0	0.00	5,495
Carbon	267	22.01	353	29.10	137	11.29	254	20.94	115	9.48	48	3.96	13	1.07	4	0.33	10	0.82	3	0.25	2	0.16	1	0.08	4	0.33	1	0.08	1	0.08	1,213
Daggett	13	31.71	11	26.83	4	9.76	8	19.51	3	7.32	2	4.88	0	0.00	0	0.00	0	0.00	0	0.00	0	0.00	0	0.00	0	0.00	0	0.00	0	0.00	41
Davis	6,841	32.63	3,977	18.97	3,154	15.04	3,615	17.24	2,046	9.76	778	3.71	237	1.13	141	0.67	81	0.39	30	0.14	18	0.09	17	0.08	13	0.06	11	0.05	9	0.04	20,968
Duchesne	83	27.30	72	23.68	45	14.80	56	18.42	21	6.91	8	2.63	6	1.97	3	0.99	4	1.32	0	0.00	0	0.00	3	0.99	3	0.99	0	0.00	0	0.00	304
Emery	44	22.00	52	26.00	15	7.50	38	19.00	22	11.00	21	10.50	3	1.50	1	0.50	2	1.00	0	0.00	1	0.50	0	0.00	1	0.50	0	0.00	0	0.00	200
Garfield	77	33.77	25	10.96	56	24.56	29	12.72	21	9.21	12	5.26	3	1.32	2	0.88	1	0.44	0	0.00	0	0.00	2	0.88	0	0.00	0	0.00	0	0.00	228
Grand	618	41.90	213	14.44	295	20.00	146	9.90	101	6.85	80	5.42	15	1.02	3	0.20	2	0.14	1	0.07	0	0.00	1	0.07	0	0.00	0	0.00	0	0.00	1,475
Iron	598	32.89	391	21.51	294	16.17	246	13.53	154	8.47	82	4.51	23	1.27	14	0.77	7	0.39	4	0.22	0	0.00	1	0.06	4	0.22	0	0.00	0	0.00	1,818
Juab	54	24.22	55	24.66	18	8.07	64	28.70	16	7.17	9	4.04	1	0.45	4	1.79	1	0.45	0	0.00	1	0.45	0	0.00	0	0.00	0	0.00	0	0.00	223
Kane	195	33.51	96	16.49	101	17.35	87	14.95	51	8.76	37	6.36	4	0.69	4	0.69	3	0.52	0	0.00	1	0.17	2	0.34	0	0.00	0	0.00	1	0.17	582
Millard	33	14.60	61	26.99	22	9.73	61	26.99	21	9.29	17	7.52	3	1.33	0	0.00	2	0.88	0	0.00	2	0.88	2	0.88	1	0.44	1	0.44	0	0.00	226
Morgan	84	25.07	81	24.18	38	11.34	63	18.81	27	8.06	26	7.76	8	2.39	0	0.00	1	0.30	1	0.30	0	0.00	2	0.60	3	0.90	1	0.30	0	0.00	335
Piute	5	19.23	5	19.23	2	7.69	7	26.92	3	11.54	2	7.69	1	3.85	0	0.00	0	0.00	0	0.00	0	0.00	0	0.00	0	0.00	1	3.85	0	0.00	26
Rich	12	22.22	20	37.04	4	7.41	7	12.96	6	11.11	4	7.41	0	0.00	0	0.00	1	1.85	0	0.00	0	0.00	0	0.00	0	0.00	0	0.00	0	0.00	54
Salt Lake	48,183	38.51	21,661	17.31	21,002	16.79	18,311	14.64	10,517	8.41	3,777	3.02	694	0.55	366	0.29	310	0.25	88	0.07	62	0.05	49	0.04	48	0.04	25	0.02	18	0.01	125,111
San Juan	495	43.23	210	18.34	107	9.34	197	17.21	54	4.72	29	2.53	5	0.44	19	1.66	11	0.96	4	0.35	5	0.44	5	0.44	0	0.00	2	0.17	2	0.17	1,145
Sanpete	198	34.55	96	16.75	83	14.49	89	15.53	56	9.77	30	5.24	9	1.57	4	0.70	5	0.87	1	0.17	0	0.00	0	0.00	1	0.17	1	0.17	0	0.00	573
Sevier	87	24.44	84	23.60	45	12.64	84	23.60	32	8.99	17	4.78	0	0.00	2	0.56	2	0.56	0	0.00	0	0.00	1	0.28	0	0.00	1	0.28	1	0.28	356
Summit	1,565	22.56	1,632	23.53	1,009	14.55	1,652	23.82	704	10.15	294	4.24	27	0.39	12	0.17	21	0.30	4	0.06	3	0.04	7	0.10	3	0.04	1	0.01	2	0.03	6,936
Tooele	917	33.27	600	21.77	338	12.26	526	19.09	230	8.35	79	2.87	27	0.98	20	0.73	6	0.22	4	0.15	4	0.15	1	0.04	2	0.07	1	0.04	1	0.04	2,756
Uintah	208	27.44	158	20.84	95	12.53	127	16.75	90	11.87	41	5.41	16	2.11	7	0.92	4	0.53	3	0.40	1	0.13	1	0.13	3	0.40	2	0.26	2	0.26	758
Utah	8,596	36.91	4,359	18.72	4,350	18.68	2,799	12.02	1,587	6.81	849	3.65	373	1.60	204	0.88	65	0.28	35	0.15	23	0.10	12	0.05	17	0.07	7	0.03	11	0.05	23,287
Wasatch	640	29.14	489	22.27	274	12.48	468	21.31	208	9.47	73	3.32	18	0.82	9	0.41	7	0.32	3	0.14	0	0.00	4	0.18	3	0.14	0	0.00	0	0.00	2,196
Washington	2,298	26.06	2,055	23.31	1,077	12.22	1,753	19.88	896	10.16	515	5.84	68	0.77	31	0.35	75	0.85	16	0.18	9	0.10	9	0.10	9	0.10	5	0.06	1	0.01	8,817
Wayne	45	27.61	24	14.72	37	22.70	27	16.56	13	7.98	13	7.98	0	0.00	1	0.61	1	0.61	0	0.00	2	1.23	0	0.00	0	0.00	0	0.00	0	0.00	163
Weber	5,010	36.51	2,672	19.47	1,881	13.71	2,323	16.93	1,159	8.45	428	3.12	83	0.60	55	0.40	47	0.34	14	0.10	21	0.15	12	0.09	6	0.04	7	0.05	6	0.04	13,724
Total	79,728	36.14	40,674	18.44	35,727	16.20	33,991	15.41	18,734	8.49	7,603	3.45	1,704	0.77	950	0.43	703	0.32	220	0.10	159	0.07	138	0.06	127	0.06	69	0.03	55	0.02	220,582

2020 Vermont Democratic presidential primary

Popular vote share by county Sanders—40–50% Sanders—50–60%

2020 Vermont Democratic presidential primary
Candidate	Votes	%	Delegates
Bernie Sanders	79,921	50.57	11
Joe Biden	34,669	21.94	5
Elizabeth Warren	19,785	12.52	
Michael Bloomberg	14,828	9.38	
Pete Buttigieg (withdrawn) (Note: Candidate withdrew during absentee voting, shortly before the primary.)	3,709	2.35	
Amy Klobuchar (withdrawn)	1,991	1.26	
Tulsi Gabbard	1,303	0.82	
Andrew Yang (withdrawn) (Note: Candidate withdrew following the New Hampshire primary, when absentee voting had already begun.)	591	0.37	
Tom Steyer (withdrawn)	202	0.13	
Deval Patrick (withdrawn)	137	0.09	
Marianne Williamson (withdrawn)	135	0.09	
Donald Trump (write-in Republican)	83	0.05	
Julian Castro (withdrawn)	52	0.03	
Hillary Clinton (write-in)	5	0.00	
Michael Bennet (write-in)	3	0.00	
Other candidates / Write-in	(Note: Including "Blank" (written in) with 8 votes; Ron Paul, Michelle Obama, John Edwards and two others with 2 votes; and 110 other write-ins with 1 vote)238	0.15	
Overvotes / Blank votes	(Note: 57 overvotes and 323 blank votes)380	0.24	
Total	158,032	100%	16

=== Results by county ===
2020 Vermont Democratic primary (results per county)
County	Bernie Sanders		Joe Biden		Elizabeth Warren		Michael Bloomberg		Pete Buttigieg		Amy Klobuchar		Tulsi Gabbard		Andrew Yang		Tom Steyer		Deval Patrick		Marianne Williamson		Mark Stewart		Julian Castro		Write-ins		Overvotes		Blank votes		Total votes cast
County	Votes	%	Votes	%	Votes	%	Votes	%	Votes	%	Votes	%	Votes	%	Votes	%	Votes	%	Votes	%	Votes	%	Votes	%	Votes	%	Votes	%	Votes	%	Votes	%	Total votes cast
Addison	5,069	48.61	2,256	21.63	1,581	15.16	974	9.34	227	2.18	117	1.12	67	0.64	34	0.33	15	0.14	7	0.07	6	0.06	11	0.11	5	0.05	17	0.16	7	0.07	35	0.34	10,428
Bennington	3,568	45.10	2,308	29.17	813	10.28	827	10.45	158	2.00	69	0.87	62	0.78	27	0.34	10	0.13	20	0.25	9	0.11	4	0.05	5	0.06	17	0.21	3	0.04	12	0.15	7,912
Caledonia	2,749	50.88	1,182	21.88	656	12.14	501	9.27	121	2.24	56	1.04	59	1.09	33	0.61	5	0.09	10	0.19	6	0.11	4	0.07	1	0.02	5	0.09	7	0.13	8	0.15	5,403
Chittenden	26,465	51.98	9,959	19.56	6,972	13.69	4,647	9.13	1,254	2.46	777	1.53	375	0.74	173	0.34	43	0.08	22	0.04	37	0.07	27	0.05	14	0.03	56	0.11	9	0.02	83	0.16	50,913
Essex	408	43.78	275	29.51	55	5.90	117	12.55	22	2.36	15	1.61	10	1.07	7	0.75	2	0.21	0	0	0	0	2	0.21	0	0	7	0.75	1	0.11	11	1.18	932
Franklin	3,962	50.14	1,919	24.28	527	6.67	1,021	12.92	194	2.46	81	1.03	57	0.72	47	0.59	7	0.09	8	0.10	14	0.18	7	0.09	4	0.05	25	0.32	3	0.04	26	0.33	7,902
Grand Isle	936	46.73	475	23.71	178	8.89	284	14.18	54	2.70	31	1.55	17	0.85	9	0.45	2	0.10	0	0	1	0.05	2	0.10	0	0	3	0.15	2	0.10	9	0.45	2,003
Lamoille	3,146	53.57	1,271	21.64	495	8.43	680	11.58	114	1.94	65	1.11	37	0.63	26	0.44	5	0.09	4	0.07	2	0.03	0	0	2	0.03	9	0.15	1	0.02	16	0.27	5,873
Orange	3,283	52.10	1,342	21.30	885	14.05	451	7.16	134	2.13	85	1.35	60	0.95	20	0.32	8	0.13	6	0.10	4	0.06	2	0.03	2	0.03	5	0.08	3	0.05	11	0.17	6,301
Orleans	1,985	51.53	899	23.34	341	8.85	439	11.40	67	1.74	37	0.96	35	0.91	14	0.36	5	0.13	4	0.10	7	0.18	5	0.13	1	0.03	1	0.03	2	0.05	10	0.26	3,852
Rutland	5,585	46.49	3,275	27.26	979	8.15	1,463	12.18	310	2.58	133	1.11	122	1.02	46	0.38	18	0.15	16	0.13	15	0.12	15	0.12	5	0.04	16	0.13	5	0.04	11	0.09	12,014
Washington	8,668	51.76	3,260	19.47	2,479	14.80	1,347	8.04	467	2.79	178	1.06	134	0.80	66	0.39	17	0.10	9	0.05	23	0.14	16	0.10	9	0.05	19	0.11	6	0.04	49	0.29	16,747
Windham	6,857	55.21	2,316	18.65	1,844	14.85	748	6.02	237	1.91	171	1.38	115	0.93	36	0.29	31	0.25	17	0.14	6	0.05	9	0.07	2	0.02	13	0.10	4	0.03	13	0.10	12,419
Windsor	7,240	47.22	3,932	25.64	1,980	12.91	1,329	8.67	350	2.28	176	1.15	153	1.00	53	0.35	34	0.22	14	0.09	5	0.03	6	0.04	2	0.01	26	0.17	4	0.03	29	0.19	15,333
Total	79,921	50.57	34,669	21.94	19,785	12.52	14,828	9.38	3,709	2.35	1,991	1.26	1,303	0.82	591	0.37	202	0.13	137	0.09	135	0.09	110	0.07	52	0.03	219	0.14	57	0.04	323	0.20	158,032

2020 Virginia Democratic presidential primary

Popular vote share by county
Biden—30–40%
Biden—40–50%
Biden—50–60%
Biden—60–70%
Biden—70–80%
Sanders—30–40%
Sanders—40–50%

Popular vote share by congressional district
Biden—40–50%
Biden—50–60%

2020 Virginia Democratic presidential primary (Note: The "2020 March Democratic Presidential Primary" website published by the Virginia Department of Elections does not include the write-in votes. This article includes them.)
Candidate	Votes	%	Delegates
Joe Biden	705,501	53.30	67
Bernie Sanders	306,388	23.15	31
Elizabeth Warren	142,546	10.77	1
Michael Bloomberg	128,030	9.67	
Tulsi Gabbard	11,288	0.85	
Pete Buttigieg (withdrawn) (Note: Candidate withdrew during absentee voting, shortly before the primary.)	11,199	0.85	
Amy Klobuchar (withdrawn)	8,414	0.64	
Andrew Yang (withdrawn) (Note: Candidate withdrew following the New Hampshire primary, when absentee voting had already begun.)	3,361	0.25	
Cory Booker (withdrawn)	1,910	0.14	
Tom Steyer (withdrawn)	1,472	0.11	
Michael Bennet (withdrawn)	1,437	0.11	
Marianne Williamson (withdrawn)	902	0.07	
Julian Castro (withdrawn)	691	0.05	
Deval Patrick (withdrawn)	370	0.03	
Write-in votes	184	0.01	
Total	1,323,693	100%	99

=== Results by locality ===
2020 Virginia Democratic primary (results per locality)
Locality	Joe Biden		Bernie Sanders		Elizabeth Warren		Michael Bloomberg		Tulsi Gabbard		Pete Buttigieg		Amy Klobuchar		Andrew Yang		Cory Booker		Tom Steyer		Michael Bennet		Marianne Williamson		Julian Castro		Deval Patrick		Write-in votes		Total votes cast
Locality	Votes	%	Votes	%	Votes	%	Votes	%	Votes	%	Votes	%	Votes	%	Votes	%	Votes	%	Votes	%	Votes	%	Votes	%	Votes	%	Votes	%	Votes	%	Total votes cast
Accomack	2,026	61.34	598	18.10	173	5.24	374	11.32	41	1.24	38	1.15	25	0.76	3	0.09	8	0.24	3	0.09	9	0.27	3	0.09	2	0.06	0	0	0	0	3,303
Albemarle	12,343	45.97	6,321	23.54	4,740	17.65	2,752	10.25	156	0.58	233	0.87	214	0.80	38	0.14	8	0.03	19	0.07	10	0.04	5	0.02	6	0.02	3	0.01	0	0	26,848
Alexandria	20,806	49.94	7,603	18.25	7,637	18.33	4,248	10.20	246	0.59	583	1.40	343	0.82	65	0.16	36	0.09	22	0.05	31	0.07	17	0.04	15	0.04	11	0.03	2	0.00	41,665
Alleghany	586	53.76	234	21.47	96	8.81	103	9.45	18	1.65	13	1.19	19	1.74	5	0.46	1	0.09	5	0.46	4	0.37	0	0	2	0.18	4	0.37	0	0	1,090
Amelia	765	67.58	171	15.11	46	4.06	103	9.10	6	0.53	14	1.24	4	0.35	2	0.18	8	0.71	5	0.44	4	0.35	2	0.18	0	0	2	0.18	0	0	1,132
Amherst	1,521	63.61	431	18.03	195	8.16	161	6.73	25	1.05	14	0.59	15	0.63	9	0.38	3	0.13	4	0.17	7	0.29	4	0.17	0	0	2	0.08	0	0	2,391
Appomattox	667	61.99	220	20.45	57	5.30	71	6.60	24	2.23	11	1.02	8	0.74	2	0.19	4	0.37	1	0.09	4	0.37	3	0.28	0	0	3	0.28	1	0.09	1,076
Arlington	34,003	48.24	13,284	18.84	14,076	19.97	6,689	9.49	383	0.54	1,109	1.57	612	0.87	154	0.22	47	0.07	31	0.04	40	0.06	27	0.04	27	0.04	11	0.02	1	0.00	70,494
Augusta	3,072	50.86	1,511	25.02	622	10.30	517	8.56	98	1.62	66	1.09	70	1.16	22	0.36	21	0.35	11	0.18	8	0.13	8	0.13	10	0.17	4	0.07	0	0	6,040
Bath	188	52.22	68	18.89	33	9.17	41	11.39	10	2.78	6	1.67	7	1.94	1	0.28	1	0.28	2	0.56	2	0.56	0	0	0	0	1	0.28	0	0	360
Bedford	3,565	54.73	1,361	20.89	558	8.57	718	11.02	122	1.87	54	0.83	54	0.83	31	0.48	7	0.11	16	0.25	10	0.15	7	0.11	3	0.05	8	0.12	0	0	6,514
Bland	139	45.13	82	26.62	43	13.96	24	7.79	8	2.60	2	0.65	4	1.30	1	0.32	2	0.65	1	0.32	1	0.32	0	0	0	0	1	0.32	0	0	308
Botetourt	1,673	53.85	693	22.30	286	9.21	318	10.23	48	1.54	28	0.90	25	0.80	10	0.32	4	0.13	7	0.23	4	0.13	5	0.16	3	0.10	3	0.10	0	0	3,107
Bristol	512	49.18	325	31.22	94	9.03	74	7.11	7	0.67	8	0.77	7	0.67	3	0.29	1	0.10	2	0.19	2	0.19	3	0.29	1	0.10	2	0.19	0	0	1,041
Brunswick	1,366	73.24	243	13.03	50	2.68	173	9.28	10	0.54	3	0.16	4	0.21	5	0.27	0	0	3	0.16	3	0.16	2	0.11	2	0.11	1	0.05	0	0	1,865
Buchanan	403	59.97	143	21.28	35	5.21	65	9.67	2	0.30	2	0.30	6	0.89	2	0.30	6	0.89	4	0.60	2	0.30	2	0.30	0	0	0	0	0	0	672
Buckingham	945	63.13	284	18.97	78	5.21	130	8.68	15	1.00	8	0.53	10	0.67	5	0.33	8	0.53	4	0.27	5	0.33	2	0.13	1	0.07	2	0.13	0	0	1,497
Buena Vista	190	49.87	87	22.83	51	13.39	36	9.45	7	1.84	3	0.79	3	0.79	1	0.26	3	0.79	0	0	0	0	0	0	0	0	0	0	0	0	381
Campbell	2,165	61.96	646	18.49	228	6.53	319	9.13	54	1.55	26	0.74	20	0.57	10	0.29	9	0.26	10	0.29	4	0.11	2	0.06	1	0.03	0	0	0	0	3,494
Caroline	2,537	64.20	744	18.83	222	5.62	323	8.17	34	0.86	26	0.66	16	0.40	11	0.28	13	0.33	6	0.15	8	0.20	8	0.20	2	0.05	2	0.05	0	0	3,952
Carroll	770	49.20	425	27.16	107	6.84	157	10.03	31	1.98	12	0.77	23	1.47	12	0.77	8	0.51	5	0.32	5	0.32	2	0.13	3	0.19	4	0.26	1	0.06	1,565
Charles City	860	71.19	169	13.99	46	3.81	102	8.44	8	0.66	6	0.50	5	0.41	3	0.25	3	0.25	2	0.17	3	0.25	0	0	1	0.08	0	0	0	0	1,208
Charlotte	702	71.85	127	13.00	43	4.40	86	8.80	6	0.61	2	0.20	3	0.31	0	0	1	0.10	3	0.31	2	0.20	0	0	2	0.20	0	0	0	0	977
Charlottesville	4,418	32.18	4,681	34.09	3,451	25.13	875	6.37	55	0.40	115	0.84	85	0.62	29	0.21	7	0.05	2	0.01	3	0.02	4	0.03	3	0.02	2	0.01	1	0.01	13,731
Chesapeake	22,063	62.99	6,917	19.75	2,165	6.18	2,818	8.05	337	0.96	209	0.60	163	0.47	88	0.25	97	0.28	50	0.14	54	0.15	23	0.07	22	0.06	14	0.04	4	0.01	35,024
Chesterfield	33,400	56.86	13,422	22.85	5,587	9.51	4,811	8.19	515	0.88	310	0.53	246	0.42	128	0.22	77	0.13	122	0.21	45	0.08	28	0.05	27	0.05	13	0.02	14	0.02	58,745
Clarke	1,209	51.40	526	22.36	249	10.59	275	11.69	28	1.19	31	1.32	19	0.81	6	0.26	1	0.04	5	0.21	1	0.04	1	0.04	0	0	1	0.04	0	0	2,352
Colonia Heights	716	49.45	402	27.76	123	8.49	130	8.98	27	1.86	10	0.69	12	0.83	7	0.48	10	0.69	5	0.35	2	0.14	1	0.07	2	0.14	1	0.07	0	0	1,448
Covington	241	60.40	86	21.55	27	6.77	29	7.27	6	1.50	3	0.75	3	0.75	2	0.50	1	0.25	0	0	0	0	1	0.25	0	0	0	0	0	0	399
Craig	166	46.50	95	26.61	40	11.20	33	9.24	10	2.80	2	0.56	4	1.12	2	0.56	2	0.56	2	0.56	0	0	0	0	0	0	1	0.28	0	0	357
Culpeper	2,642	53.16	1,203	24.21	409	8.23	543	10.93	47	0.95	41	0.82	36	0.72	12	0.24	10	0.20	9	0.18	5	0.10	3	0.06	6	0.12	3	0.06	1	0.02	4,970
Cumberland	696	68.91	164	16.24	57	5.64	62	6.14	6	0.59	6	0.59	6	0.59	4	0.40	4	0.40	3	0.30	2	0.20	0	0	0	0	0	0	0	0	1,010
Danville	3,879	71.85	748	13.85	170	3.15	463	8.58	25	0.46	14	0.26	24	0.44	6	0.11	25	0.46	15	0.28	12	0.22	9	0.17	8	0.15	1	0.02	0	0	5,399
Dickenson	313	55.69	178	31.67	15	2.67	32	5.69	7	1.25	4	0.71	4	0.71	4	0.71	2	0.36	1	0.18	1	0.18	0	0	1	0.18	0	0	0	0	562
Dinwiddie	2,366	73.05	466	14.39	93	2.87	235	7.26	14	0.43	18	0.56	12	0.37	7	0.22	10	0.31	2	0.06	8	0.25	4	0.12	3	0.09	1	0.03	0	0	3,239
Emporia	413	73.62	67	11.94	16	2.85	53	9.45	4	0.71	3	0.53	0	0	1	0.18	2	0.36	1	0.18	0	0	0	0	0	0	1	0.18	0	0	561
Essex	852	70.88	138	11.48	65	5.41	118	9.82	8	0.67	6	0.50	6	0.50	2	0.17	1	0.08	2	0.17	1	0.08	2	0.17	0	0	1	0.08	0	0	1,202
Fairfax (City)	2,674	45.11	1,561	26.33	783	13.21	666	11.23	61	1.03	67	1.13	73	1.23	24	0.40	6	0.10	2	0.03	5	0.08	2	0.03	3	0.05	1	0.02	0	0	5,928
Fairfax (County)	121,927	49.82	57,157	23.36	29,550	12.08	28,203	11.52	1,795	0.73	2,654	1.08	1,875	0.77	753	0.31	211	0.09	129	0.05	200	0.08	113	0.05	110	0.04	37	0.02	0	0	244,714
Falls Church	2,355	48.11	881	18.00	909	18.57	527	10.77	19	0.39	91	1.86	100	2.04	6	0.12	2	0.04	2	0.04	3	0.06	0	0	0	0	0	0	0	0	4,895
Fauquier	5,141	52.34	2,152	21.91	924	9.41	1,210	12.32	139	1.42	92	0.94	93	0.95	28	0.29	10	0.10	5	0.05	10	0.10	12	0.12	5	0.05	1	0.01	0	0	9,822
Floyd	628	35.36	740	41.67	231	13.01	108	6.08	24	1.35	9	0.51	20	1.13	2	0.11	3	0.17	4	0.23	1	0.06	4	0.23	2	0.11	0	0	0	0	1,776
Fluvanna	1,991	52.71	823	21.79	478	12.66	357	9.45	32	0.85	28	0.74	33	0.87	9	0.24	7	0.19	7	0.19	3	0.08	7	0.19	2	0.05	0	0	0	0	3,777
Franklin	848	69.00	173	14.08	49	3.99	129	10.50	10	0.81	3	0.24	2	0.16	1	0.08	4	0.33	2	0.16	4	0.33	1	0.08	3	0.24	0	0	0	0	1,229
Franklin	2,539	56.76	913	20.41	299	6.68	476	10.64	65	1.45	52	1.16	65	1.45	11	0.25	11	0.25	15	0.34	10	0.22	9	0.20	5	0.11	3	0.07	0	0	4,473
Frederick	4,417	50.71	2,214	25.42	806	9.25	892	10.24	135	1.55	89	1.02	67	0.77	36	0.41	8	0.09	20	0.23	6	0.07	11	0.13	2	0.02	8	0.09	0	0	8,711
Fredericksburg	2,126	45.77	1,263	27.19	641	13.80	439	9.45	48	1.03	66	1.42	22	0.47	13	0.28	12	0.26	3	0.06	3	0.06	5	0.11	2	0.04	0	0	2	0.04	4,645
Galax	173	52.74	82	25.00	20	6.10	39	11.89	6	1.83	4	1.22	0	0	0	0	1	0.30	0	0	0	0	0	0	2	0.61	1	0.30	0	0	328
Giles	541	47.29	332	29.02	113	9.88	97	8.48	25	2.19	7	0.61	7	0.61	8	0.70	3	0.26	5	0.44	1	0.09	1	0.09	2	0.17	2	0.17	0	0	1,144
Gloucester	2,165	54.06	912	22.77	354	8.84	411	10.26	52	1.30	36	0.90	24	0.60	12	0.30	7	0.17	9	0.22	9	0.22	8	0.20	4	0.10	2	0.05	0	0	4,005
Goochland	2,509	61.03	692	16.83	312	7.59	480	11.68	33	0.80	28	0.68	26	0.63	5	0.12	6	0.15	9	0.22	5	0.12	4	0.10	2	0.05	0	0	0	0	4,111
Grayson	425	54.14	182	23.18	76	9.68	60	7.64	13	1.66	11	1.40	10	1.27	3	0.38	0	0	4	0.51	0	0	1	0.13	0	0	0	0	0	0	785
Greene	916	46.43	526	26.66	253	12.82	190	9.63	31	1.57	25	1.27	17	0.86	5	0.25	3	0.15	2	0.10	2	0.10	2	0.10	1	0.05	0	0	0	0	1,973
Greensville	827	74.17	144	12.91	24	2.15	90	8.07	5	0.45	5	0.45	2	0.18	3	0.27	4	0.36	4	0.36	5	0.45	1	0.09	1	0.09	0	0	0	0	1,115
Halifax	2,324	72.85	465	14.58	102	3.20	226	7.08	11	0.34	12	0.38	17	0.53	3	0.09	8	0.25	6	0.19	8	0.25	5	0.16	2	0.06	1	0.03	0	0	3,190
Hampton	15,745	65.91	4,341	18.17	1,298	5.43	1,967	8.23	143	0.60	86	0.36	68	0.28	49	0.21	67	0.28	36	0.15	36	0.15	16	0.07	15	0.06	13	0.05	10	0.04	23,890
Hanover	8,328	54.14	3,490	22.69	1,645	10.70	1,314	8.54	225	1.46	112	0.73	119	0.77	41	0.27	24	0.16	21	0.14	18	0.12	21	0.14	9	0.06	6	0.04	8	0.05	15,381
Harrisonburg	2,090	32.24	2,591	39.97	1,387	21.39	249	3.84	50	0.77	40	0.62	37	0.57	15	0.23	7	0.11	6	0.09	6	0.09	1	0.02	3	0.05	1	0.02	0	0	6,483
Henrico	37,813	57.08	14,707	22.20	6,305	9.52	5,909	8.92	431	0.65	369	0.56	281	0.42	127	0.19	96	0.14	52	0.08	70	0.11	36	0.05	28	0.04	16	0.02	6	0.01	66,246
Henry	2,697	69.15	635	16.28	143	3.67	298	7.64	44	1.13	27	0.69	17	0.44	9	0.23	10	0.26	7	0.18	5	0.13	2	0.05	5	0.13	1	0.03	0	0	3,900
Highland	146	51.77	74	26.24	38	13.48	10	3.55	3	1.06	5	1.77	4	1.42	2	0.71	0	0	0	0	0	0	0	0	0	0	0	0	0	0	282
Hopewell	1,444	63.98	435	19.27	122	5.41	182	8.06	14	0.62	15	0.66	9	0.40	4	0.18	11	0.49	6	0.27	7	0.31	1	0.04	3	0.13	0	0	4	0.18	2,257
Isle of Wight	3,482	65.33	918	17.22	287	5.38	481	9.02	65	1.22	25	0.47	26	0.49	10	0.19	14	0.26	8	0.15	7	0.13	5	0.09	1	0.02	1	0.02	0	0	5,330
James City	9,154	57.70	2,577	16.24	1,578	9.95	1,986	12.52	168	1.06	174	1.10	142	0.90	23	0.14	13	0.08	22	0.14	10	0.06	7	0.04	3	0.02	6	0.04	1	0.01	15,864
King and Queen	551	67.11	136	16.57	47	5.72	66	8.04	8	0.97	3	0.37	3	0.37	1	0.12	3	0.37	0	0	0	0	3	0.37	0	0	0	0	0	0	821
King George	1,452	55.19	566	21.51	236	8.97	263	10.00	50	1.90	28	1.06	20	0.76	8	0.30	4	0.15	1	0.04	0	0	1	0.04	0	0	1	0.04	1	0.04	2,631
King William	1,049	60.60	330	19.06	112	6.47	175	10.11	12	0.69	7	0.40	12	0.69	9	0.52	3	0.17	8	0.46	5	0.29	4	0.23	0	0	5	0.29	0	0	1,731
Lancaster	1,212	64.47	240	12.77	98	5.21	253	13.46	12	0.64	27	1.44	21	1.12	1	0.05	4	0.21	4	0.21	2	0.11	1	0.05	3	0.16	2	0.11	0	0	1,880
Lee	308	60.63	121	23.82	26	5.12	31	6.10	3	0.59	2	0.39	6	1.18	0	0	2	0.39	4	0.79	4	0.79	1	0.20	0	0	0	0	0	0	508
Lexington	565	47.40	227	19.04	263	22.06	106	8.89	4	0.34	17	1.43	6	0.50	1	0.08	0	0	0	0	1	0.08	1	0.08	0	0	1	0.08	0	0	1,192
Loudoun	36,233	50.54	18,103	25.25	7,196	10.04	8,034	11.21	625	0.87	639	0.89	353	0.49	225	0.31	69	0.10	49	0.07	69	0.10	37	0.05	38	0.05	15	0.02	4	0.01	71,689
Louisa	2,523	56.97	897	20.25	385	8.69	457	10.32	64	1.45	26	0.59	34	0.77	9	0.20	9	0.20	7	0.16	5	0.11	8	0.18	2	0.05	3	0.07	0	0	4,429
Lunenburg	874	71.70	171	14.03	53	4.35	94	7.71	2	0.16	4	0.33	9	0.74	3	0.25	4	0.33	3	0.25	1	0.08	0	0	1	0.08	0	0	0	0	1,219
Lynchburg	4,836	56.88	1,806	21.24	791	9.30	773	9.09	105	1.24	40	0.47	47	0.55	36	0.42	19	0.22	12	0.14	17	0.20	6	0.07	7	0.08	2	0.02	5	0.06	8,502
Madison	756	52.94	308	21.57	151	10.57	156	10.92	20	1.40	12	0.84	17	1.19	2	0.14	1	0.07	1	0.07	2	0.14	1	0.07	1	0.07	0	0	0	0	1,428
Manassas	2,321	46.81	1,438	29.00	507	10.23	510	10.29	45	0.91	48	0.97	41	0.83	20	0.40	6	0.12	6	0.12	8	0.16	2	0.04	5	0.10	1	0.02	0	0	4,958
Manassas Park	765	44.37	593	34.40	159	9.22	141	8.18	5	0.29	24	1.39	13	0.75	8	0.46	7	0.41	3	0.17	2	0.12	2	0.12	1	0.06	1	0.06	0	0	1,724
Martinsville	1,117	67.62	267	16.16	54	3.27	178	10.77	10	0.61	4	0.24	8	0.48	4	0.24	2	0.12	3	0.18	2	0.12	0	0	1	0.06	0	0	2	0.12	1,652
Mathews	608	55.63	211	19.30	89	8.14	133	12.17	13	1.19	15	1.37	9	0.82	5	0.46	3	0.27	1	0.09	4	0.37	0	0	0	0	2	0.18	0	0	1,093
Mecklenburg	2,111	66.05	491	15.36	173	5.41	292	9.14	34	1.06	20	0.63	28	0.88	7	0.22	14	0.44	4	0.13	8	0.25	8	0.25	4	0.13	2	0.06	0	0	3,196
Middlesex	863	61.38	256	18.21	89	6.33	149	10.60	12	0.85	12	0.85	14	1.00	0	0	3	0.21	1	0.07	2	0.14	1	0.07	2	0.14	2	0.14	0	0	1,406
Montgomery	5,560	38.78	5,093	35.52	2,393	16.69	866	6.04	137	0.96	111	0.77	94	0.66	38	0.27	9	0.06	18	0.13	9	0.06	7	0.05	1	0.01	2	0.01	0	0	14,338
Nelson	1,340	53.15	560	22.21	303	12.02	229	9.08	28	1.11	28	1.11	17	0.67	3	0.12	3	0.12	3	0.12	2	0.08	4	0.16	1	0.04	0	0	0	0	2,521
New Kent	1,583	59.71	477	17.99	211	7.96	279	10.52	34	1.28	19	0.72	15	0.57	12	0.45	7	0.26	3	0.11	5	0.19	2	0.08	2	0.08	0	0	2	0.08	2,651
Newport News	15,607	61.31	5,286	20.77	1,639	6.44	2,252	8.85	185	0.73	131	0.51	111	0.44	60	0.24	52	0.20	41	0.16	45	0.18	14	0.05	13	0.05	11	0.04	8	0.03	25,455
Norfolk	18,873	56.11	8,106	24.10	2,737	8.14	3,059	9.09	246	0.73	212	0.63	137	0.41	70	0.21	70	0.21	33	0.10	38	0.11	25	0.07	21	0.06	3	0.01	8	0.02	33,638
Northampton	1,150	63.85	284	15.77	83	4.61	227	12.60	9	0.50	18	1.00	17	0.94	2	0.11	4	0.22	3	0.17	3	0.17	1	0.06	0	0	0	0	0	0	1,801
Northumberland	1,061	66.11	178	11.09	90	5.61	203	12.65	20	1.25	14	0.87	25	1.56	3	0.19	3	0.19	3	0.19	5	0.31	0	0	0	0	0	0	0	0	1,605
Norton	74	47.44	52	33.33	13	8.33	10	6.41	4	2.56	0	0	2	1.28	0	0	0	0	0	0	1	0.64	0	0	0	0	0	0	0	0	156
Nottoway	884	64.06	233	16.88	72	5.22	119	8.62	10	0.72	10	0.72	13	0.94	3	0.22	3	0.22	2	0.14	4	0.29	3	0.22	1	0.07	0	0	23	1.67	1,380
Orange	2,222	53.32	911	21.86	379	9.10	479	11.50	47	1.13	36	0.86	53	1.27	8	0.19	4	0.10	7	0.17	9	0.22	7	0.17	3	0.07	2	0.05	0	0	4,167
Page	693	52.30	325	24.53	116	8.75	128	9.66	21	1.58	15	1.13	16	1.21	5	0.38	2	0.15	0	0	0	0	2	0.15	2	0.15	0	0	0	0	1,325
Patrick	550	50.74	252	23.25	87	8.03	121	11.16	20	1.85	13	1.20	12	1.11	6	0.55	7	0.65	6	0.55	2	0.18	3	0.28	3	0.28	2	0.18	0	0	1,084
Petersburg	3,930	73.46	718	13.42	190	3.55	438	8.19	9	0.17	14	0.26	12	0.22	4	0.07	8	0.15	5	0.09	6	0.11	3	0.06	3	0.06	1	0.02	9	0.17	5,350
Pittsylvania	3,472	68.49	815	16.08	187	3.69	416	8.21	38	0.75	14	0.28	33	0.65	17	0.34	26	0.51	21	0.41	14	0.28	8	0.16	4	0.08	4	0.08	0	0	5,069
Poquoson	631	47.27	355	26.59	111	8.31	144	10.79	39	2.92	15	1.12	20	1.50	4	0.30	2	0.15	4	0.30	1	0.07	2	0.15	3	0.22	4	0.30	0	0	1,335
Portsmouth	10,189	65.94	2,753	17.82	746	4.83	1,431	9.26	76	0.49	57	0.37	51	0.33	24	0.16	41	0.27	21	0.14	29	0.19	13	0.08	6	0.04	3	0.02	12	0.08	15,452
Powhatan	1,812	56.24	699	21.69	272	8.44	324	10.06	47	1.46	29	0.90	23	0.71	7	0.22	1	0.03	3	0.09	1	0.03	1	0.03	3	0.09	0	0	0	0	3,222
Prince Edward	1,453	63.51	350	15.30	230	10.05	189	8.26	16	0.70	15	0.66	10	0.44	4	0.17	8	0.35	3	0.13	5	0.22	3	0.13	1	0.04	1	0.04	0	0	2,288
Prince George	2,418	67.83	636	17.84	169	4.74	245	6.87	31	0.87	13	0.36	14	0.39	8	0.22	11	0.31	4	0.11	5	0.14	5	0.14	3	0.08	2	0.06	1	0.03	3,565
Prince William	37,406	53.02	18,405	26.09	5,716	8.10	7,019	9.95	566	0.80	514	0.73	374	0.53	205	0.29	90	0.13	52	0.07	77	0.11	43	0.06	64	0.09	16	0.02	10	0.01	70,557
Pulaski	1,220	52.59	585	25.22	192	8.28	245	10.56	29	1.25	17	0.73	10	0.43	8	0.34	2	0.09	2	0.09	3	0.13	3	0.13	2	0.09	1	0.04	1	0.04	2,320
Radford	705	39.36	654	36.52	240	13.40	124	6.92	24	1.34	19	1.06	12	0.67	5	0.28	1	0.06	2	0.11	3	0.17	1	0.06	1	0.06	0	0	0	0	1,791
Rappahannock	676	50.75	331	24.85	124	9.31	133	9.98	14	1.05	24	1.80	21	1.58	1	0.08	1	0.08	1	0.08	3	0.23	2	0.15	0	0	1	0.08	0	0	1,332
Richmond (City)	24,360	43.73	19,006	34.12	7,779	13.96	3,609	6.48	255	0.46	234	0.42	156	0.28	92	0.17	63	0.11	31	0.06	51	0.09	35	0.06	13	0.02	12	0.02	14	0.03	55,710
Richmond (County)	444	70.03	81	12.78	40	6.31	54	8.52	8	1.26	3	0.47	1	0.16	0	0	0	0	0	0	0	0	2	0.32	1	0.16	0	0	0	0	634
Roanoke (City)	6,824	51.25	3,490	26.21	1,513	11.36	1,161	8.72	77	0.58	97	0.73	62	0.47	26	0.20	20	0.15	16	0.12	19	0.14	5	0.04	1	0.01	5	0.04	0	0	13,316
Roanoke (County)	6,009	52.73	2,730	23.96	1,142	10.02	1,148	10.07	145	1.27	75	0.66	59	0.52	20	0.18	12	0.11	16	0.14	9	0.08	15	0.13	6	0.05	4	0.04	5	0.04	11,395
Rockbridge	1,569	55.40	533	18.82	320	11.30	311	10.98	31	1.09	29	1.02	33	1.17	3	0.11	1	0.04	1	0.04	1	0.04	0	0	0	0	0	0	0	0	2,832
Rockingham	3,402	48.08	1,924	27.19	1,022	14.44	445	6.29	106	1.50	52	0.73	65	0.92	25	0.35	7	0.10	15	0.21	2	0.03	7	0.10	4	0.06	0	0	0	0	7,076
Russell	542	54.64	291	29.33	45	4.54	66	6.65	11	1.11	5	0.50	11	1.11	1	0.10	7	0.71	4	0.40	3	0.30	2	0.20	1	0.10	3	0.30	0	0	992
Salem	1,312	50.36	689	26.45	275	10.56	238	9.14	21	0.81	17	0.65	16	0.61	11	0.42	2	0.08	12	0.46	4	0.15	6	0.23	1	0.04	1	0.04	0	0	2,605
Scott	324	51.76	201	32.11	38	6.07	37	5.91	7	1.12	4	0.64	5	0.80	1	0.16	0	0	6	0.96	0	0	0	0	2	0.32	1	0.16	0	0	626
Shenandoah	1,703	50.34	882	26.07	346	10.23	312	9.22	41	1.21	24	0.71	30	0.89	14	0.41	8	0.24	9	0.27	5	0.15	4	0.12	4	0.12	1	0.03	0	0	3,383
Smyth	629	53.67	315	26.88	80	6.83	85	7.25	18	1.54	12	1.02	7	0.60	3	0.26	8	0.68	5	0.43	2	0.17	3	0.26	4	0.34	1	0.09	0	0	1,172
Southampton	1,325	68.30	285	14.69	73	3.76	196	10.10	9	0.46	16	0.82	12	0.62	4	0.21	4	0.21	3	0.15	5	0.26	4	0.21	4	0.21	0	0	0	0	1,940
Spotsylvania	9,243	54.54	4,002	23.62	1,327	7.83	1,729	10.20	198	1.17	154	0.91	117	0.69	50	0.30	40	0.24	26	0.15	22	0.13	20	0.12	8	0.05	10	0.06	0	0	16,946
Stafford	11,613	54.68	5,091	23.97	1,724	8.12	2,015	9.49	307	1.45	162	0.76	122	0.57	79	0.37	36	0.17	25	0.12	25	0.12	21	0.10	15	0.07	4	0.02	0	0	21,239
Staunton	1,754	42.90	1,189	29.08	716	17.51	246	6.02	47	1.15	43	1.05	59	1.44	11	0.27	6	0.15	11	0.27	1	0.02	3	0.07	3	0.07	0	0	0	0	4,089
Suffolk	10,029	68.09	2,380	16.16	735	4.99	1,241	8.43	120	0.81	53	0.36	55	0.37	26	0.18	33	0.22	15	0.10	23	0.16	11	0.07	4	0.03	3	0.02	0	0	14,728
Surry	977	71.52	207	15.15	49	3.59	103	7.54	7	0.51	1	0.07	7	0.51	1	0.07	0	0	1	0.07	6	0.44	2	0.15	2	0.15	0	0	3	0.22	1,366
Sussex	1,015	77.48	146	11.15	21	1.60	95	7.25	2	0.15	7	0.53	6	0.46	2	0.15	5	0.38	2	0.15	4	0.31	2	0.15	1	0.08	2	0.15	0	0	1,310
Tazewell	749	51.55	404	27.80	91	6.26	95	6.54	34	2.34	18	1.24	19	1.31	7	0.48	9	0.62	11	0.76	10	0.69	3	0.21	2	0.14	1	0.07	0	0	1,453
Virginia Beach	33,528	54.87	14,624	23.93	4,471	7.32	6,467	10.58	716	1.17	458	0.75	339	0.55	157	0.26	86	0.14	97	0.16	64	0.10	34	0.06	33	0.05	20	0.03	14	0.02	61,108
Warren	1,583	47.77	901	27.19	344	10.38	334	10.08	58	1.75	32	0.97	14	0.42	12	0.36	12	0.36	6	0.18	8	0.24	8	0.24	0	0	1	0.03	1	0.03	3,314
Washington	1,602	51.48	820	26.35	311	9.99	258	8.29	30	0.96	37	1.19	20	0.64	12	0.39	6	0.19	10	0.32	1	0.03	3	0.10	1	0.03	1	0.03	0	0	3,112
Waynesboro	1,320	48.12	779	28.40	321	11.70	203	7.40	34	1.24	24	0.87	25	0.91	10	0.36	9	0.33	5	0.18	7	0.26	4	0.15	1	0.04	1	0.04	0	0	2,743
Westmoreland	1,438	65.57	345	15.73	105	4.79	246	11.22	28	1.28	5	0.23	11	0.50	3	0.14	2	0.09	1	0.05	3	0.14	3	0.14	2	0.09	1	0.05	0	0	2,193
Williamsburg	1,435	40.23	1,133	31.76	626	17.55	281	7.88	21	0.59	30	0.84	18	0.50	7	0.20	2	0.06	4	0.11	4	0.11	5	0.14	0	0	1	0.03	0	0	3,567
Winchester	1,666	47.42	979	27.87	413	11.76	321	9.14	26	0.74	38	1.08	38	1.08	13	0.37	5	0.14	2	0.06	6	0.17	2	0.06	3	0.09	1	0.03	0	0	3,513
Wise	552	44.05	469	37.43	113	9.02	69	5.51	12	0.96	13	1.04	13	1.04	2	0.16	2	0.16	3	0.24	4	0.32	0	0	1	0.08	0	0	0	0	1,253
Whythe	657	47.16	424	30.44	134	9.62	114	8.18	13	0.93	17	1.22	14	1.01	5	0.36	2	0.14	4	0.29	2	0.14	2	0.14	0	0	1	0.07	4	0.29	1,393
York	5,641	56.46	2,006	20.08	933	9.34	1,003	10.04	137	1.37	102	1.02	74	0.74	33	0.33	16	0.16	16	0.16	8	0.08	15	0.15	4	0.04	2	0.02	1	0.01	9,991
Total	705,501	53.30	306,388	23.15	142,546	10.77	128,030	9.67	11,288	0.85	11,199	0.85	8,414	0.64	3,361	0.25	1,910	0.14	1,472	0.11	1,437	0.11	902	0.07	691	0.05	370	0.03	184	0.01	1,323,693
