= Jessica Delfino =

American comedian

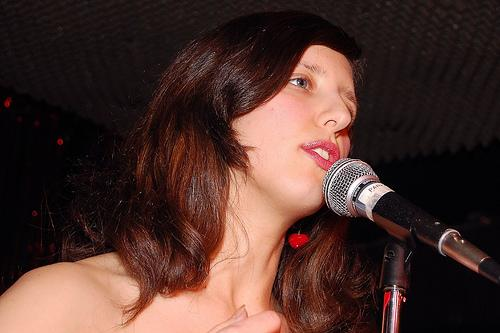
- Delfino performing in 2008

Background information
- Born: Bridgeport, Connecticut
- Genres: Folk rock Alternative rock Indie rock Pop rock Comedy; Stand-up Comedy
- Occupations: Singer-songwriter comedian
- Instruments: Vocals, guitar, flying v ukulele, rape whistle
- Years active: 2001–present
- Label: Loudmouth Records

Jessica Delfino (born June 8, in Bridgeport, Connecticut) is a singer, songwriter, and comedian based in New York City. Her songs tend to ridicule taboos and typically include jokes about vaginas and other sexual or dark topics. In her act, she plays an assortment of instruments including guitar, flying V ukulele and a rape whistle. She is also an illustrator and attended Philadelphia's Art Institute, as well as the University of Maine. She has won numerous awards, including winning the 2024 Holding Court comedy contest at Camp Out in the Poconos, placing as a finalist in the 2024 Lehigh Valley's Funniest Competition, beating out Flight of the Conchords to win the Best Musical Act at the 2005 ECNY awards, and a 2005 Village Voice "Best of" Award, in which the Village Voice declared her to be "fall-off-your-chair hilarious." She has appeared on Good Morning America as a finalist in a national comedy competition. She has also won many other competitions, some of them unusual, such as The Stoned Spelling Bee in Brooklyn, the Madagascar Institute's Catholic high school talent competition and the Arlene's Grocery "Gong Show," which later became The Gong Show with Dave Attell on Comedy Central.

== Career ==
=== Music and performance ===
Jessica Delfino's first CD, Dirty Folk Rock came out in 2004 on the Soundcakes International label. It received excellent reviews all across the United States, including in Jane Magazine, High Times (Best "unsigned" Act of The Week), Arthur Magazine (in a fawning review by Sonic Youth's Thurston Moore) and The Onion (describing her as "Redd Foxx meets Jewel").

Delfino's second CD, I Wanna Be Famous, came out in June 2008 on the Loudmouth Records label, and was officially the first CD ever to be released by that label. It has received praise from Time Out New York, Time Out London, and Blender Magazine's Rob Tannenbaum, who described Delfino as "The Joan Baez of the Vagina Song." Animator Nick Fox-Gieg's video for the title cut of the song, I Wanna Be Famous, has been viewed more than one million times on YouTube.

She has appeared on Opie & Anthony's radio show, UK comedian Russell Brand's radio show, the Sundance Channel, BBC's Loose Ends Radio Programme, the Montreal Comedy Festival, the (Scotland) Edinburgh Fringe Festival, the Galway (Ireland) Comedy Festival, the Bud Light Comedy Festival (Dublin, Ireland), the NY International Children's Film Festival and toured the US with Lisa "Suckdog" Crystal Carver, Dame Darcy, The Trachtenburg Family Slideshow Players, and Corn Mo as their opening act. She has also appeared on the Fox News Channel show, "Red Eye" with Greg Gutfeld.

Delfino, together with Meat Cake author and fellow musician Dame Darcy created Naughty Nautical Nite, a monthly maritime-themed cabaret show at The Slipper Room in New York City, which showcases off-beat acts from around the world, such as ventriloquist Carla Rhodes and world-renowned thereminist Pamelia Kurstin. In September 2008, she appeared in sold-out performances of her show, Dirty Folk Rock, at the Soho Theatre in London, for which she received a "Critics Choice" from Time Out London.

Delfino is also known for performing as various unusual characters, including "Bilge Baron" in her histrionic fear-metal band Haunted Pussy and "T-Top Trans-Am" (her white-trash burlesque act) amongst many others, some of which appear in "Skits N Tits" the monthly sketch comedy show she co-produces in NYC with Diane O'Debra Langan and Steph Sabelli.

On Thursday, September 10, 2015, Delfino performed 16 times in New York City, setting a record for most consecutive comedic sets performed on one night, and beating out comedian Steve Byrne, who'd previously held the record with 13. Two days later, her record was toppled by comedian Aaron Berg, who performed 23 sets in one night. Delfino still holds the record for most consecutive comedic music sets in one night, and most comedic sets performed by a female in one night.

==== New York Annual Funny Songs Festival ====
In June 2012, Jessica Delfino organized the First Annual Funny Songs Festival in New York City, "a four-day event that bills itself as the city's first comedy music festival," featuring performers including Rob Paravonian, Jen Kwok, Ben Lerman, Soce the Elemental Wizard, Mindy Raf, Carolyn Castiglia, Myq Kaplan, Micah Sherman, and Jessica Delfino herself, among many others. The festival occurred from Thursday, June 7, 2012, through Sunday, June 10, 2012, in Manhattan's Lower East Side neighborhood, and Delfino and the festival were the subjects of feature articles in The New York Times, Time Out New York, and numerous other publications.

==== The Mom Report ====
Delfino wrote and voiced a weekly parenting segment on WABT 96.7 FM radio as part of Gary Cee's Morning Show from December 2021 to April 2023.

==== Poconos Underground Comedy ====
In 2024, Delfino and fellow comedian Boris Khaykin started a monthly comedy show together called Poconos Underground Comedy at Newberry's Yard of Ale.

=== Politics ===
Delfino managed the 2005 mayoral campaign of Christopher X. Brodeur, and she was featured in the 2009 documentary, The Promise of New York.

=== The Times-Tribune ===
Jessica Delfino joined The Times-Tribune as a political reporter in May 2024. During her tenure, she was invited to a fishing trip with Governor Josh Shapiro of Pennsylvania, where she conducted an exclusive interview with him. She also covered the 2024 political election for the news outlet and was part of the press detail that accompanied Vice President Kamala Harris and Second Gentleman Doug Emhoff. Additionally, she reported on political rallies for both Donald Trump and Kamala Harris. During her tenure, Delfino conducted interviews with Pennsylvania congressmen U.S. Representative Rob Bresnahan (R-8, Pa.), U.S. Representative Matt Cartwright (D-8, Pa) and former U.S. Senator Bob Casey Jr.

=== Writing ===
Delfino wrote for MTV's game show, I Bet You Will. Later, Morgan Spurlock hired her to write songs for his 2007 documentary film, What Would Jesus Buy?.

Delfino writes a blog that Wil Wheaton called "the funniest thing I've ever read." Her blog has since been moved to her website. She has also been a regular contributor for TNT's Saving Grace television series blog.

In 2016, Delfino wrote a weekly cannabis-themed Twitter round-up column for High Times called Toasted Tweets.

Through 2017–2020, she went on to write about parenting and cannabis for High Times and pen pieces about parenting for The Atlantic, Huffington Post, VH1, and The Week, and satire for McSweeney's Internet Tendencies, Working Mother, The New Yorker, and The New York Times.

She also was a contributor in the writer's room on Adult Swim's Mr. Punk Goes To Washington and for Bravo.

== Controversy ==
On December 19, 2006, Catholic League president William A. Donohue publicly attacked Delfino's act, asserting that it "provides ammunition" to Muslim terrorists by "harboring a depraved understanding of liberty." In response, Delfino stated, "I was brought up Catholic, and I was also brought up to believe that it isn't anti-Catholic to celebrate the life-giving and life-nurturing parts of a woman's body. I don't know why William Donohue hates women's bodies. I don't know why he is afraid of refocusing attention on humanity's true source of creation, the mysterious and magical womb. But I do know that William Donohue is a hypocrite and a bigot, who has publicly made outrageous and highly-offensive anti-Semitic, and now anti-Muslim statements. And that certainly doesn't make him a better Catholic than I am. William Donohue does not speak for all Catholics. He doesn't speak for me."

On the day after Google announced its purchase of YouTube, YouTube removed a popular video of one of Delfino's songs, the subject of which was that her vagina was magic. On October 11, 2008, that same video was featured as the top pick on playboy.com's "Video Hotlist," and was featured on the main front page of playboy.com's website.

== Discography ==
=== Albums ===
- Dirty Folk Rock, 2004
- I Wanna Be Famous, 2008
- Perfect Holidays, 2010
- Songs To Make War To, 2012

=== Singles ===
- "My Pussy Is Magic"
- "I Wanna Be Famous"
- "Jewish Boys"
