= 2005 New York City mayoral election =

- November 8, 2005
- Registered: 3,944,831
- Turnout: 1,315,360; 33.34% (▼7.59 pp)
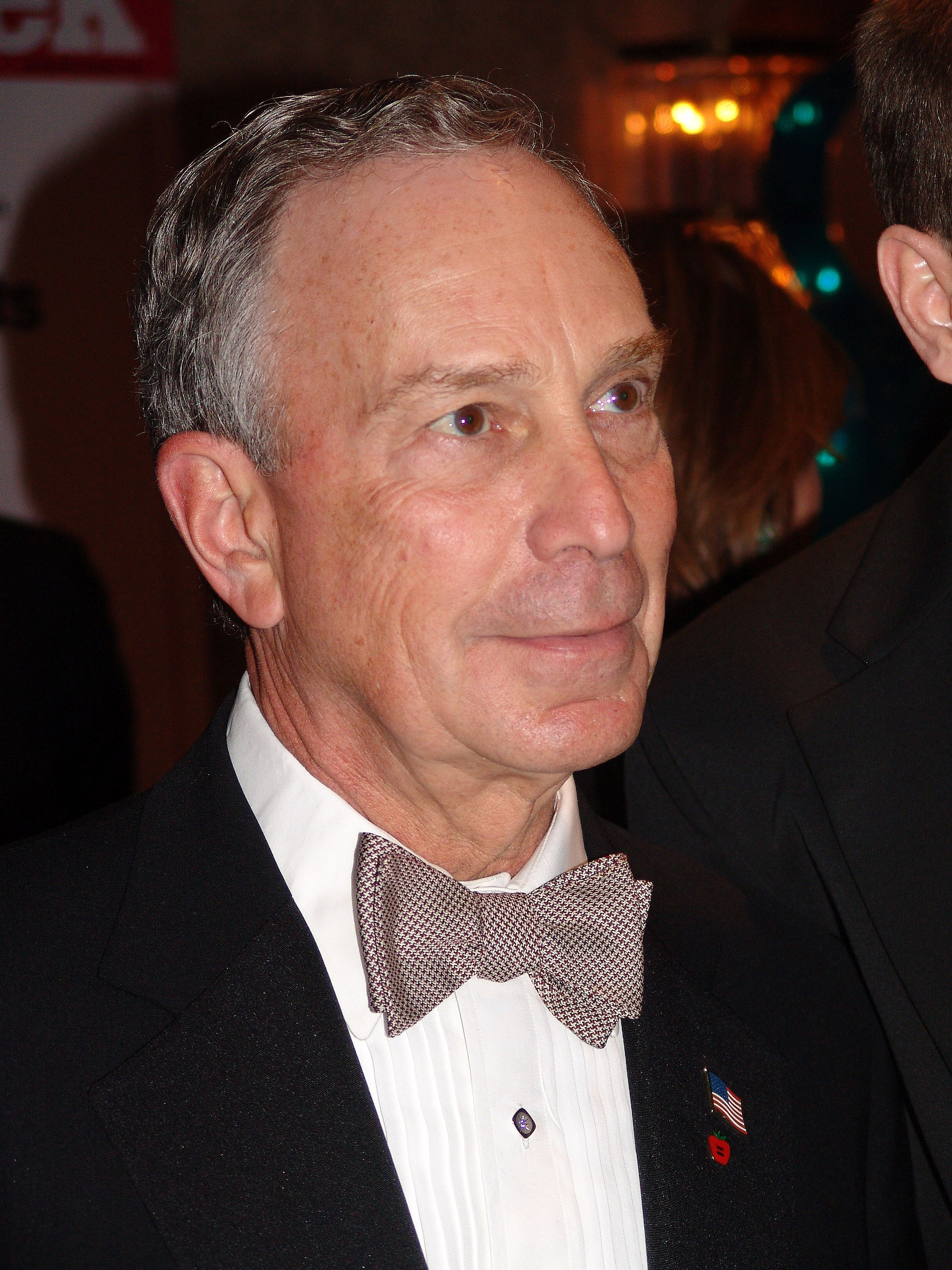

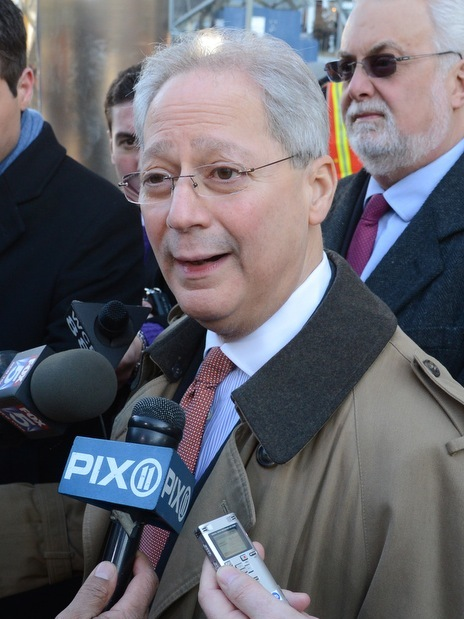
Nominee	Michael Bloomberg	Fernando Ferrer
Party	Republican	Democratic
Alliance	Liberal; Independence
Popular vote	753,090	503,219
Percentage	58.4%	39.0%
- Bloomberg: 40–50% 50–60% 60–70% 70–80% 80–90% >90% Ferrer: 40–50% 50–60% 60–70% 70–80% 80–90% >90% Tie: 40–50% 50% No data
Mayor before election
Michael Bloomberg
Republican
Elected Mayor
Michael Bloomberg
Republican

The 2005 New York City mayoral election occurred on November 8, 2005. Incumbent Republican mayor Michael Bloomberg defeated the Democratic nominee, former Bronx borough president Fernando Ferrer. Several third-party candidates also ran for mayor. In July, mayoral candidates filed nominating petitions with the City Board of Elections.

Bloomberg won four of the five boroughs, the exception being the Bronx. He flipped the boroughs of Manhattan and Brooklyn. To date, this is the last time a Republican was elected mayor of New York City, and the last time a Republican line carried Brooklyn. Bloomberg left the Republican Party in 2007 to register as an independent, but the Republican Party nominated him for reelection in 2009.

== Republican primary ==
=== Candidates ===
- Michael Bloomberg, incumbent mayor since 2002
- Walter Iwachiw
- Tom Ognibene, former City Councilman from Queens (1992–2002) and Council minority leader
- Steve Shaw

=== Campaign ===
Tom Ognibene ran on a platform supporting tax cuts, education reform and opposed Mayor Bloomberg's smoking ban. He was expected to win the endorsement of the Conservative Party. He received 8,100 signatures, 600 more than the necessary 7,500 signatures to appear on the primary ballot. But the Bloomberg campaign challenged many signatures, leaving Ognibene with 5,848 eligible signatures and forcing him off the ballot. On August 25, a federal judge refused to allow Ognibene on the Republican ballot.

The first television ads were launched in English and Spanish by the Bloomberg campaign on May 18.

=== Endorsements ===
Ognibene was endorsed by the leaders of the Queens County Republican Committee on February 10.

=== Polling ===
Hypothetical polling

Source	Date	Sample size	Margin of error	Bloomberg	Ognibene
Quinnipiac University	March 2, 2004	210 RV	± 6.8%	65%	16%

=== Aftermath ===
Ognibene challenged the Republican nomination in a hearing on August 25, but his challenge was unsuccessful.

== Democratic primary ==
=== Candidates ===
- Christopher X. Brodeur, artist and Green Party candidate in 2001
- Fernando Ferrer, former Bronx Borough President (1987–2001) and candidate for Mayor in 2001
- C. Virginia Fields, Manhattan Borough President
- Gifford Miller, Speaker of the New York City Council
- Arthur Piccolo
- Anthony Weiner, U.S. Representative from Brooklyn and Queens

==== Withdrew ====
- Charles Barron, member of the City Council from the 42nd district (endorsed Fields)

==== Declined ====
- Mark Green, nominee for mayor in 2001 (ran for New York Attorney General in 2006)
- Bob Kerrey, former U.S. Senator from Nebraska and President of the New School
- Bill Thompson, New York City Comptroller
- Howard Dean, Former Governor of Vermont

=== Campaign ===
On August 3, Ferrer began running campaign advertisements. On August 12, the Gifford Miller campaign launched its own television ads. The Democratic candidates held their first debate on August 16. The Anthony Weiner campaign launched television ads on August 19, the same day voter registration for the primary elections ended. The Democratic candidates held their second televised debate on August 21, sponsored by WCBS and The New York Times.

=== Endorsements ===
On September 1, Ferrer was endorsed by City Comptroller Bill Thompson and ACORN. On September 3, The New York Times endorsed Ferrer in the Democratic primary. The Democratic candidates held two final debates, on WNBC on September 7 and on WABC on September 8. On September 10, Reverend Al Sharpton endorsed Ferrer.

Before the primary, Ferrer was endorsed by New York state attorney general Eliot Spitzer, Carl McCall, Geraldine Ferraro, Sheldon Silver, the Transport Workers Union, Bronx borough president Adolfo Carrión Jr., and Ruth Messinger. He was also endorsed by Representatives Joseph Crowley, Gregory Meeks, Major Owens, José E. Serrano, Edolphus Towns and Nydia Velázquez.

=== Debate ===
2005 New York City mayoral election democratic primary debate
No.	Date	Host	Moderator	Link	Democratic	Democratic	Democratic	Democratic
Key: P Participant A Absent N Not invited I Invited W Withdrawn								
Key: P Participant A Absent N Not invited I Invited W Withdrawn					Fernando Ferrer	C. Virginia Fields	Gifford Miller	Anthony Weiner
1	Sep. 16, 2005	New York 1 New York 1 Noticias; New York City Campaign Finance Board; New York Newsday; WNYC	Dominic Carter	YouTube	P	P	P	P

=== Polling ===
Hypothetical polling

Source	Date	Sample size	Margin of error	Barron	Ferrer	Fields	Miller	Thompson	Weiner
Marist College	April 7, 2004	335 RV	± 5.5%	2%	34%	8%	6%	6%	8%
Quinnipiac University	November 10, 2004	754 RV	± 3.6%	3%	28%	14%	8%	9%	8%
Marist College	December 2004			–	38%	13%	11%	–	10%
Quinnipiac University	January 19, 2005			5%	31%	15%	12%	–	10%
Quinnipiac University	March 2, 2005	909 RV	± 3.3%	–	40%	14%	12%	–	12%
Marist College	March 23, 2005	485 RV	± 4.5%	–	39%	21%	10%	–	11%
Quinnipiac University	March 30, 2005	835 RV	± 3.4%	–	36%	21%	10%	–	11%
Marist College	April 2005			–	34%	30%	12%	–	11%
Quinnipiac University	May 11, 2005	707 RV	± 3.7%	–	27%	23%	11%	–	13%
Marist College	June 2005			–	38%	24%	13%	–	12%
Quinnipiac University	June 22, 2005	1,140 RV	± 2.9%	–	31%	19%	12%	–	12%
Quinnipiac University	July 19, 2005	807 RV	± 3.5%	–	33%	16%	15%	–	11%
Marist College	July 22, 2005	470 RV	± 4.5%	–	36%	19%	14%	–	14%
Marist College	August 9, 2005	406 RV	± 5.0%	–	30%	19%	15%	–	13%
Quinnipiac University	August 18, 2005	489 LV	± 4.4%	–	33%	17%	17%	–	16%
Quinnipiac University	September 7, 2005	572 LV	± 4.1%	–	32%	13%	17%	–	21%
Quinnipiac University	September 12, 2005	717 LV	± 3.7%	–	32%	14%	14%	–	25%

=== Results ===
Democratic primary election results Total votes: 478,818
Borough	Fernando Ferrer	Anthony Weiner	C. Virginia Fields	Gifford Miller	Christopher X. Brodeur	Arthur Piccolo	Michael Bloomberg (write-in)	Other write-in
Manhattan	56,579	46,668	24,856	22,075	5,667	1,388	95	
The Bronx	50,088	11,422	10,381	3,491	4,942	938	13	
Brooklyn	50,068	41,358	25,612	14,324	3,724	1,963	9	
Queens	32,506	34,028	13,918	7,956	2,054	1,175	1	
Staten Island	3,021	5,441	1,059	1,669	174	120	3	
Total	192,262	138,917	75,826	49,515	16,561	5,584	121	32

The Democratic primary was held on September 13, with initial returns showing Ferrer receiving 39.95% of the votes, just short of the 40% needed to avoid a runoff with Weiner. Despite at first seeming poised to continue, the next morning Weiner conceded the election to Ferrer. But the city election board insisted on proceeding with a $12 million election scheduled for September 27, with an additional debate even planned. This prompted a lawsuit supported by both candidates to prevent the runoff, which was avoided when the final count gave Ferrer just over 40% of the vote.

== Other nominations ==
=== Conservative ===
Despite his removal from the Republican primary, Tom Ognibene ran as the Conservative Party nominee.

=== Independence ===
On May 28, the Independence Party endorsed Bloomberg for reelection.

=== Liberal ===
The Liberal Party of New York endorsed Bloomberg.

=== Green ===
Manhattan College history professor Anthony Gronowicz was the Green Party's mayoral nominee. Gronowicz sought to strengthen affordable housing, supported renewable sources of energy and sought to provide free tuition to City University of New York. He was featured in an article in The Villager.

=== Libertarian ===
Audrey Silk, a former NYPD officer, community activist and founder of NYC Citizens Lobbying Against Smoker Harassment, was nominated by the party on April 16, 2005.

== General election ==
=== Candidates ===
- Michael Bloomberg, incumbent mayor since 2002 (Republican, Independence, Liberal)
- Fernando Ferrer, former Bronx Borough President (Democrat)
- Tom Ognibene (Conservative)
- Anthony Gronowicz (Green)
- Jimmy McMillan (Rent Is Too Damn High)
- Audrey Silk (Libertarian)
- Martin Koppel (Socialist Workers)
- Seth Blum (Education)
- Mitch Crumblehorn (Independent)

=== Campaign ===
Issues in the 2005 mayoral race included education, taxes, crime, transportation, public housing, homeland security funding, and the city budget. One prominent issue throughout 2005 was New York's bid for the 2012 Olympic Games, as New York City was one of the finalists to serve as host city. On June 6, the planned West Side Stadium was defeated by the Public Authorities Control Board when Assembly Speaker Sheldon Silver and State Senate Majority Leader Joseph Bruno refused to vote for it. As a result, Bloomberg had supported the new Mets ballpark, later Citi Field, as the centerpiece of the revised bid. On July 6, the IOC awarded London the 2012 Summer Olympics.

On October 23, Ferrer proposed Home Owner Property Exemption, or HOPE, a tax break for homeowners with a home property value of less than $100,000.

On October 6, a mayoral debate was held at the Apollo Theater with Ferrer and Ognibene; Bloomberg was absent. The last day for voter registration for the general election was October 14. The first mayoral debate between Ferrer and Bloomberg was on October 30, and broadcast on WABC. They debated each other again on November 1, at a debate sponsored by WNBC and the New York City Campaign Finance Board.

The general election was held on November 8. Members of the New York City Council, as well as the offices of borough president, city comptroller, public advocate, and district attorney, were also up for election. At 10:30 p.m. on November 8, Ferrer conceded to Bloomberg in a speech at the Waldorf-Astoria hotel. Bloomberg was sworn in for a second term on January 1, 2006.

=== Endorsements ===
Bloomberg was endorsed by former mayors Rudy Giuliani and Ed Koch, Jeanine Pirro, Herman Badillo, former congressman Floyd Flake, Reverend Calvin Butts, and many prominent local Democrats.

On October 23, Bloomberg was endorsed by both Newsday and The New York Times in the general election, with the New York Daily News following on the 31st. The Times wrote that Bloomberg could be "one of the greatest mayors in New York history" but criticized "his 'obscene' unlimited spending on his political campaigns", creating an "uneven playing field".

After winning the Democratic nomination, Ferrer was endorsed by Senators Chuck Schumer and Hillary Clinton, as well as former President Bill Clinton, on September 16. On September 19, he was endorsed by SEIU Local 1199. He was endorsed by former mayor David Dinkins on September 23. Ferrer was endorsed by the Working Families Party on September 27, but failed to receive enough votes from the party's coordinating council to be nominated for the Working Families Party's ballot line. Andrew Cuomo endorsed Ferrer on September 29. On October 20, Ferrer campaigned with Bill Clinton on Charlotte Street in the South Bronx.

=== Polling ===
Source	Date	Sample size	Margin of error	Ferrer (D)	Bloomberg (R)
Quinnipiac University	November 25, 2003	1,147 RV	± 2.9%	51%	33%
Quinnipiac University	February 4, 2004	1,776 RV	± 2.9%	46%	39%
Quinnipiac University	March 31, 2004	1,159 RV	± 2.9%	45%	41%
Marist College	April 7, 2004	546 RV	± 4.5%	48%	41%
Quinnipiac University	June 9, 2004	1,226 RV	± 2.8%	45%	39%
Quinnipiac University	July 20, 2004	1,119 RV	± 2.9%	46%	39%
Marist College	September 10, 2004	607 RV	± 4.0%	47%	43%
Quinnipiac University	November 10, 2004	1,221 RV	± 2.8%	45%	40%
Marist College	December 15, 2004	503 RV	± 4.5%	51%	39%
Quinnipiac University	January 19, 2005	1,027 RV	± 3.1%	43%	43%
Quinnipiac University	March 2, 2005	1,435 RV	± 2.6%	47%	39%
Marist College	March 23, 2005	775 RV	± 3.5%	49%	42%
Quinnipiac University	March 30, 2005	1,371 RV	± 2.7%	46%	40%
Marist College	April 27, 2005	525 RV	± 4.5%	38%	51%
Quinnipiac University	May 11, 2005	1,169 RV	± 2.9%	38%	47%
Marist College	June 10, 2005			46%	45%
Quinnipiac University	June 22, 2005	1,780 RV	± 2.3%	37%	50%
Quinnipiac University	July 19, 2005	1,313 RV	± 2.7%	36%	52%
Marist College	July 22, 2005	755 RV	± 3.5%	36%	52%
Marist College	August 9, 2005	661 RV	± 4.0%	36%	52%
The New York Times	August 22–28, 2005	718 RV	± 5.0%	32%	54%
Quinnipiac University	September 21, 2005	774 LV	± 3.5%	38%	52%
WNBC/Marist College	September 27, 2005	381 LV	± 5.0%	38%	53%
Marist College	October 12, 2005			32%	59%
Quinnipiac University	October 12, 2005	725 LV	± 3.6%	32%	60%
Quinnipiac University	October 25, 2005	723 LV	± 3.6%	30%	61%
Pace University	October 27, 2005			27%	58%
The New York Times	October 21–26, 2005	758 RV	± 4.0%	30%	57%
Marist College	November 1, 2005			31%	62%
Quinnipiac University	November 1, 2005	742 LV	± 3.6%	31%	59%
Marist College	November 4, 2005			30%	64%
Quinnipiac University	November 7, 2005	712 LV	± 3.7%	30%	68%

Hypothetical polling

Source	Date	Sample size	Margin of error	Barron (D)	Bloomberg (R)
Quinnipiac University	February 4, 2004	1,776 RV	± 2.9%	32%	43%
Quinnipiac University	March 31, 2004	1,159 RV	± 2.9%	34%	41%
Quinnipiac University	June 9, 2004	1,226 RV	± 2.8%	34%	42%
Quinnipiac University	July 20, 2004	1,119 RV	± 2.9%	31%	43%
Quinnipiac University	November 10, 2004	1,221 RV	± 2.8%	32%	42%
Marist College	December 15, 2004	503 RV	± 4.5%	38%	44%
Quinnipiac University	January 19, 2005	1,027 RV	± 3.1%	31%	46%

Source	Date	Sample size	Margin of error	Fields (D)	Bloomberg (R)
Quinnipiac University	March 31, 2004	1,159 RV	± 2.9%	39%	41%
Quinnipiac University	June 9, 2004	1,226 RV	± 2.8%	39%	43%
Quinnipiac University	July 20, 2004	1,119 RV	± 2.9%	38%	42%
Quinnipiac University	November 10, 2004	1,221 RV	± 2.8%	38%	42%
Quinnipiac University	December 2004			44%	44%
Marist College	December 15, 2004	503 RV	± 4.5%	44%	44%
Quinnipiac University	January 19, 2005	1,027 RV	± 3.1%	39%	44%
Marist College	March 2005			42%	45%
Quinnipiac University	March 2, 2005	1,435 RV	± 2.6%	38%	41%
Marist College	March 23, 2005	775 RV	± 3.5%	42%	45%
Quinnipiac University	March 30, 2005	1,371 RV	± 2.7%	41%	42%
Marist College	April 27, 2005	525 RV	± 4.5%	41%	47%
Quinnipiac University	May 11, 2005	1,169 RV	± 2.9%	38%	43%
Marist College	June 2, 2005			41%	49%
Marist College	June 10, 2005			43%	45%
Quinnipiac University	June 22, 2005	1,780 RV	± 2.3%	34%	49%
Quinnipiac University	July 19, 2005	1,313 RV	± 2.7%	29%	55%
Marist College	July 22, 2005	755 RV	± 3.5%	32%	53%
Marist College	August 9, 2005	661 RV	± 4.0%	34%	52%

Source	Date	Sample size	Margin of error	Green (D)	Bloomberg (R)
Quinnipiac University	February 4, 2004	1,776 RV	± 2.9%	45%	42%

Source	Date	Sample size	Margin of error	McLaughlin (D)	Bloomberg (R)
Quinnipiac University	February 4, 2004	1,776 RV	± 2.9%	34%	40%

Source	Date	Sample size	Margin of error	Miller (D)	Bloomberg (R)
Quinnipiac University	November 25, 2003	1,147 RV	± 2.9%	41%	33%
Quinnipiac University	February 4, 2004	1,776 RV	± 2.9%	37%	39%
Quinnipiac University	March 31, 2004	1,159 RV	± 2.9%	38%	41%
Quinnipiac University	June 9, 2004	1,226 RV	± 2.8%	38%	40%
Quinnipiac University	July 20, 2004	1,119 RV	± 2.9%	37%	39%
Quinnipiac University	November 10, 2004	1,221 RV	± 2.8%	36%	42%
Marist College	December 15, 2004	503 RV	± 4.5%	40%	42%
Quinnipiac University	January 19, 2005	1,027 RV	± 3.1%	38%	43%
Marist College	March 2005			42%	44%
Quinnipiac University	March 2, 2005	1,435 RV	± 2.6%	38%	40%
Marist College	March 23, 2005	775 RV	± 3.5%	42%	44%
Quinnipiac University	March 30, 2005	1,371 RV	± 2.7%	40%	40%
Marist College	April 27, 2005	525 RV	± 4.5%	36%	50%
Quinnipiac University	May 11, 2005	1,169 RV	± 2.9%	35%	42%
Marist College	July 2, 2005			36%	53%
Marist College	July 10, 2005			41%	46%
Quinnipiac University	June 22, 2005	1,780 RV	± 2.3%	33%	49%
Quinnipiac University	July 19, 2005	1,313 RV	± 2.7%	30%	55%
Marist College	July 22, 2005	755 RV	± 3.5%	31%	53%
Marist College	August 9, 2005	661 RV	± 4.0%	33%	53%

Source	Date	Sample size	Margin of error	Thompson (D)	Bloomberg (R)
Quinnipiac University	February 4, 2004	1,776 RV	± 2.9%	36%	40%
Quinnipiac University	March 31, 2004	1,159 RV	± 2.9%	38%	41%
Quinnipiac University	June 9, 2004	1,226 RV	± 2.8%	38%	41%
Quinnipiac University	July 20, 2004	1,119 RV	± 2.9%	35%	40%
Quinnipiac University	November 10, 2004	1,221 RV	± 2.8%	36%	40%

Source	Date	Sample size	Margin of error	Weiner (D)	Bloomberg (R)
Quinnipiac University	February 4, 2004	1,776 RV	± 2.9%	34%	40%
Quinnipiac University	March 31, 2004	1,159 RV	± 2.9%	36%	40%
Quinnipiac University	June 9, 2004	1,226 RV	± 2.8%	37%	42%
Quinnipiac University	July 20, 2004	1,119 RV	± 2.9%	34%	40%
Quinnipiac University	November 10, 2004	1,221 RV	± 2.8%	35%	40%
Marist College	December 15, 2004	503 RV	± 4.5%	39%	44%
Quinnipiac University	January 19, 2005	1,027 RV	± 3.1%	36%	43%
Marist College	March 2005			41%	45%
Quinnipiac University	March 2, 2005	1,435 RV	± 2.6%	36%	41%
Marist College	March 23, 2005	775 RV	± 3.5%	41%	45%
Quinnipiac University	March 30, 2005	1,371 RV	± 2.7%	35%	43%
Marist College	April 27, 2005	525 RV	± 4.5%	36%	48%
Quinnipiac University	May 11, 2005	1,169 RV	± 2.9%	32%	44%
Marist College	June 2, 2005			34%	52%
Marist College	June 10, 2005			36%	49%
Quinnipiac University	June 22, 2005	1,780 RV	± 2.3%	30%	51%
Quinnipiac University	July 19, 2005	1,313 RV	± 2.7%	28%	54%
Marist College	July 22, 2005	755 RV	± 3.5%	29%	53%
Marist College	August 9, 2005	661 RV	± 4.0%	34%	52%

=== Debates ===
2005 New York City mayoral election debates
No.	Date	Host	Moderator	Link	Republican	Democratic
Key: P Participant A Absent N Not invited I Invited W Withdrawn						
Key: P Participant A Absent N Not invited I Invited W Withdrawn					Michael Bloomberg	Fernando Ferrer
1	Oct. 6, 2005	New York 1, New York 1 Noticias; New York City Campaign Finance Board; New York Newsday, WNYC	Dominic Carter	YouTube	P	P
2	Oct. 30, 2005	WABC-TV	Bill Ritter	C-SPAN	P	P
3	Nov. 1, 2005	New York City Campaign Finance Board; WNBC	Gabe Pressman	YouTube	P	P

=== Results ===
Results of the 2005 New York City mayoral election
Party	Candidate	Votes	%	±%
Republican (Liberal)	Michael Bloomberg	678,444	52.6	
Independence	Michael Bloomberg	74,645	5.8	
Total	Michael Bloomberg (incumbent)	753,089	58.4	+8.1
Democratic	Fernando Ferrer	503,219	39.0	−8.9
Conservative	Thomas Ognibene	14,630	1.1	+0.9
Green	Anthony Gronowicz	8,297	0.6	+0.1
Rent Is Too Damn High	Jimmy McMillan	4,111	0.3	+0.3
Libertarian	Audrey Silk	2,888	0.2	+0.1
Socialist Workers	Martin Koppel	2,256	0.2	+0.2
Education	Seth Blum	1,176	0.1	+0.1
Write-Ins		269	0.02	+0.02
Majority		249,870	19.4	+17.0
Turnout		1,289,935		
Republican hold		Swing	+8.5	

=== Results by borough ===
Results by borough of the 2005 New York City mayoral election
		Manhattan	The Bronx	Brooklyn	Queens	Staten Island	Total
Bloomberg–Green margin (2001)		−22,777	−21,683	−28,182	+46,904	+61,227	+35,489
Bloomberg–Ferrer margin		+76,197	−41,317	+69,441	+95,030	+50,523	+249,871
Republican–Liberal	Michael Bloomberg	171,593	69,577	189,040	184,426	63,267	678,444
Independence	Michael Bloomberg	25,416	6,840	20,141	17,689	4,559	74,645
Combined total	Michael Bloomberg	197,010	76,417	209,723	202,116	67,827	753,090
		60.4%	38.8%	58.2%	63.5%	76.7%	58.4%
Democratic	Fernando Ferrer	120,813	117,734	140,282	107,086	17,304	503,219
		37.0%	59.8%	39.0%	33.6%	19.6%	39.0%
Conservative	Thomas Ognibene	1,729	1,185	3,573	5,645	2,498	14,630
Green	Anthony Gronowicz	3,195	466	3,112	1,285	239	8,297
Rent Is Too Damn High	Jimmy McMillan	1,369	474	1,293	799	176	4,111
Libertarian	Audrey Silk	991	234	841	617	205	2,888
Socialist Workers	Martin Koppel	758	231	766	384	117	2,256
Education	Seth Blum	322	131	382	264	77	1,176
write-ins		109	1	90	57	12	269
	T O T A L	326,295	196,873	360,061	318,252	88,454	
							1,289,935
