= Gifford Miller =

American politician

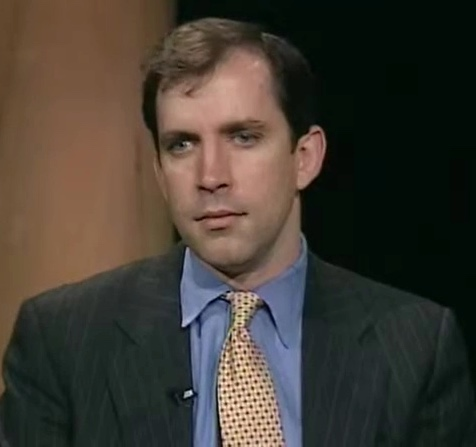
- Miller on CUNY TV's The Urban Agenda, 2002

Speaker of the New York City Council
- In office January 9, 2002 – December 31, 2005
- Preceded by: Peter F. Vallone, Sr.
- Succeeded by: Christine C. Quinn

Member of the New York City Council from the 5th district
- In office January 9, 1996 – December 31, 2005
- Preceded by: Charles Millard
- Succeeded by: Jessica Lappin

Personal details
- Born: Alan Gifford Miller; November 6, 1969 (age 57) New York, New York, U.S.
- Party: Democratic
- Spouse: Pamela Addison
- Children: 2
- Education: Princeton University (BA)

Alan Gifford Miller (born November 6, 1969) is the former Speaker of the New York City Council who represented the 5th district. Barred from seeking reelection due to term limits, the Democrat ran unsuccessfully in the Democratic primary for the opportunity to run against incumbent Republican Mayor, Michael Bloomberg in November 2005.

== Early life and education ==
Miller grew up in New York City with mother Lynden B. Miller, a prominent landscape designer, and father Leigh Miller, who was a political appointee to Presidents Kennedy and Johnson.

Miller attended St. Bernard's School,. He graduated from Middlesex School and Princeton University, earning a degree in political science. Following his graduation from Princeton in 1992, Miller joined the staff of Representative Carolyn B. Maloney, a Democrat who represented the New York 14th Congressional District, which overlaps Council District 5. Council District 5 represents of the Upper East Side, Yorkville, Carnegie Hill, Turtle Bay, Sutton Place and Roosevelt Island.

Miller dropped out of Fordham University Law School in 2000 to focus on his successful race for the New York City Council Speaker.

== Political career ==
On January 9, 1996, Miller won his first term in the New York City Council at the age of 26. He was the first Democrat in recent history elected to represent the traditionally wealthy district. He easily won reelection in 1997, 2001 and 2003; term limits laws prohibited him from seeking a fifth term. Following a unanimous election on January 9, 2002, Miller succeeded Peter Vallone, Sr. to become the second Speaker of the New York City Council.

Under Miller's leadership the Council passed new laws to protect children from lead-paint poisoning, expanded civil rights, strengthened the City's campaign finance system and established tax credits to encourage greater energy savings and cleaner air. He also oversaw changes in land use, zoning affordable housing and led the post 9-11 recovery. He was known for frequently clashing with Mayor Bloomberg, which he saw as key to the work of the Speaker role.

Miller sought the Democratic mayoral nomination in 2005 and was known for his outreach to constituent communities by performing their national anthems. His opponents for the nomination included former Bronx borough president Fernando Ferrer, Congressman Anthony D. Weiner and outgoing Manhattan borough president C. Virginia Fields. Although Miller had the most money of any of the candidates in the Democratic field and worked to add his name to the ballot under a new party, as well as many key endorsements, he suffered severe reversals of fortune in the final month of the primary. In the end, Miller placed fourth in the primary field with 10.19%.

The winner of the Democratic primary election on September 13, 2005 was Ferrer, who was easily defeated by Republican mayor Michael Bloomberg in the general election held on November 8, 2005.

== Post-elected office activities ==
Following the completion of his City Council tenure, Miller purchased a soccer team, worked in consulting and serves on a number of non profit boards. He also continued his work in affordable housing.

== Personal life ==
He lives in Manhattan with his wife, Pamela Addison.

Political offices
Preceded by Charles Millard	New York City Council, 5th district 1996–2005	Succeeded by Jessica Lappin
Preceded by Peter F. Vallone, Sr.	Speaker, New York City Council; 2002–2005	Succeeded by Christine Quinn
