= Ben Kallos =

American attorney and politician (born 1981)

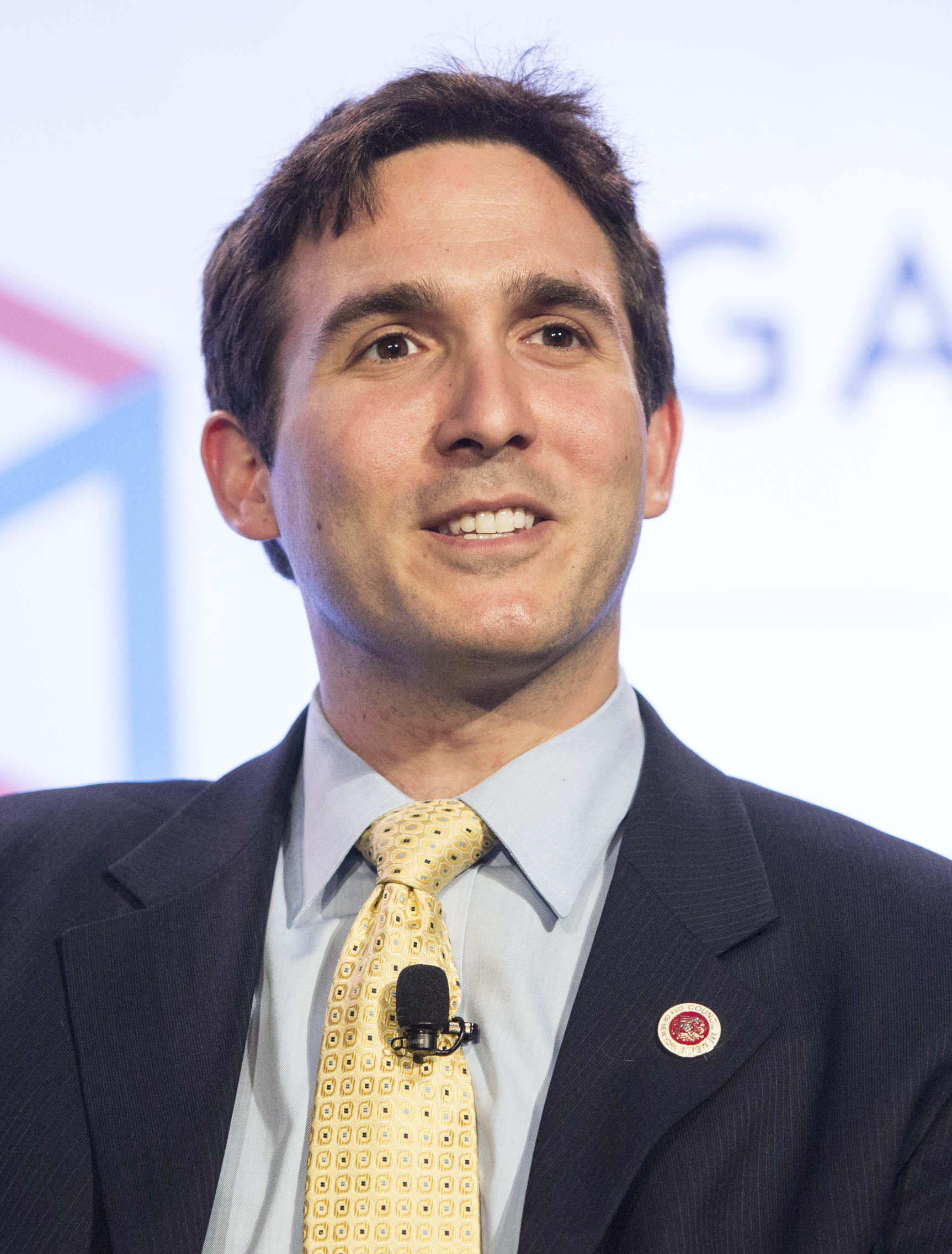
- Kallos in 2015

Official in the Executive Office of the President
- In office 2022–2024

Member of the New York City Council from the 5th district
- In office January 1, 2014 – January 1, 2022
- Preceded by: Jessica Lappin
- Succeeded by: Julie Menin

Personal details
- Born: Benjamin J. Kallos; February 5, 1981 (age 45) Florida, U.S.
- Party: Democratic
- Education: University at Albany (BA); University at Buffalo (JD)
- Website: BenKallos.com

Benjamin J. Kallos (born February 5, 1981) is an American attorney, politician, and software developer. Co-Chair of the Progressive Caucus and as a member of the Democratic Party, he represented the 5th district of the New York City Council from 2014 to 2021. During his tenure, Kallos was described as applying agile management principles, adapted from software development, to initiatives aimed at improving transparency and constituent services. Kallos has authored laws to recapture existing affordable housing, improve public education, create a full public campaign finance system, and alleviate poverty by providing health and food benefits automatically.

From 2022 to 2024, he served as an official in the United States Digital Service within the Executive Office of the President.

== Early life and education ==
Kallos was born in Florida. He attended Rabbi Arthur Schneier Park East Day School. He then attended Bronx High School of Science where he caught attention for starting a technology consulting firm at 15-years-old. He earned a BA in Psychology, Communication and Rhetoric, Philosophy, and Religion from the University at Albany in 2002. He received his JD from the University at Buffalo School of Law in 2005.

== Career ==
Kallos has served on Manhattan Community Board 8 from 2006 to 2007 prior serving as chief of staff for New York State Assemblymember Jonathan Bing from 2007 to 2009. He was also, director of policy for then New York City Public Advocate Mark Green in 2009, and executive director of New Roosevelt from 2010 to 2013. During this time he served as the statewide coordination committee chair for the New York Democratic Lawyers Council from 2005 to 2013.

In 2010, he was featured as an Insurgent by the Observer as a "one-man political geek squad" for building websites where people could check their voter registration and how their elected officials voted. In 2011 he was included in the 40 Under 40 by City & State, for his work on government transparency, ousting State Senator Pedro Espada, and public service working for the New York State Attorney General and Sen. Chuck Schumer.

=== New York City Council ===
In 2013, The New York Times endorsed Kallos in the Democratic primary, describing him as bringing “fresh ideas” and citing his proposals to forgive student loans for City University of New York graduates who work and remain in the city, require developers to build more affordable housing in exchange for tax abatements, expand broadband access, and revisit congestion pricing. In 2017, the Excelsior Scholarship was launched statewide covering the last dollars of tuition with the requirement that students stay and work in New York after graduation. Kallos remained a strong advocate for congestion pricing which launched in January 2025.

On September 10, 2013, Kallos won the Democratic primary for the 5th New York City Council District, receiving 46% of the vote to Micah Kellner's 39% and Ed Hartzog's 15%. He won the general election on November 5, 2013, and assumed office on January 1, 2014. On November 5, 2017, Kallos won reelection to another term with 81% of the vote.

As a Council Member, Kallos was ranked among the best lawmakers in the New York City Council in 2017 and again in 2020, and was listed among the most powerful New York City politicians in 2018, 2019, and 2021 by City & State. Kallos has also been recognized as one of the "politicians who call the shots on real estate" by the Commercial Observer.

==== Public campaign finance and ethics ====
In 2014, Kallos refused $64,000 in additional income, and then wrote the laws to ban outside income and make the job of Council Member full-time. In 2016, Kallos wrote a law to make New York City's budget available online, which he worked with Mayor de Blasio to implement.

Kallos authored the law that raised the cap on public funds received by participating candidates to establish a new full public matching system that matches every small dollar donated by New York City residents at a rate of 8 to 1. The new public matching system worked to elect a City Council that was for the first time majority women.

==== Housing and Land use ====
===== Affordable Housing =====
In 2015, Kallos worked with ProPublica and a whistle blower on an investigation that found 50,000 affordable apartments that were not registered by landlords who were receiving tax breaks, and might have been charging tenants too much rent. Kallos authored legislation to force landlords receiving tax benefits for affordable housing to register every unit and allow anyone to apply for them online. The law passed in 2017, requiring most landlords in New York City to register their affordable housing. In 2020, as part of the legislation, the city began to add back hundreds of thousands of existing affordable apartments, launched an affordable housing portal, Housing Connect.

===== Billionaire's Row =====
In 2015, Kallos began organizing community opposition to a proposed 950-foot Billionaire's Row tower on Sutton Place. In 2016, he participated in a community-led rezoning effort intended to limit the construction of similar supertall buildings for billionaires. The rezoning was approved in 2017, halting the planned tower and restricting future high-rise development in the area.

Kallos later supported zoning amendments that prohibited the use of large mechanical voids designed to increase building height without adding residential or commercial space, a measure aimed at curbing the construction of extremely tall residential towers for billionaires on the Upper East and Upper West Sides.

===== Land Use =====
In 2015, Kallos opposed legislation that sought to weaken the city's landmarks law. In 2017, he authored a law to reform the Board of Standards and Appeals, a zoning relief body. In the same year, Kallos authored a law to force developers, including Donald Trump, to honor agreements to provide amenities in Privately Owned Public Spaces. Kallos proposed legislation to get scaffolding down in a timely manner. He authored a law in 2017 to lower the noise allowed from construction during the evenings and weekend.

===== Homeless =====
In 2016, Kallos founded the Eastside Taskforce on Homeless Outreach and Services to connect the homeless and hungry with churches, synagogues, and non-profits offering meals, legal services, and food. In 2019, Kallos opened supportive housing for homeless women and children on the Upper East Side. In 2021, he won community support to welcome a new shelter in his district.

===== Short Term Rentals =====
In 2021, Kallos introduced a measure regulating short-term rentals by requiring more than 37,000 units listed on platforms such as Airbnb to register with New York City. The measure was intended to address concerns that unregistered short-term rentals reduced the supply of long-term housing and contributed to rising housing costs.

==== Public Education ====
===== Universal Childcare =====
Beginning in 2014, Kallos supported Mayor Bill de Blasio’s initiative to provide universal pre-kindergarten for all four-year-olds. After the Upper East Side initially received fewer seats than needed, he led efforts to expand capacity, resulting in 400 additional pre-kindergarten seats by 2018. Kallos later advocated for extending free pre-kindergarten to three-year-olds, a program that was implemented citywide in 2021.

He also pushed for universal after-school programming, the restoration of funding for Summer Youth Employment Program slots, and the development of the Summer Rising initiative, which offered free academic and recreational programming during the summer months.

===== School Seats =====
Kallos wrote the law to force transparency around how the city determines need for school seats. As a result of his law, the city agreed to add nearly 200 new school seats to the neighborhood Kallos represents.

===== School Food & Child Nutrition =====
As a high school student, Kallos was too ashamed to stand on the free and reduced school lunch line and went hungry instead. In 2015, Kallos passed a law he authored to force reporting on the number of meals served to students to help win breakfast after the bell and free lunch for every public school student. Kallos authored a law in 2019 to require that only healthy drinks are offered with children's meals in New York City. In 2021, Kallos proposed offering free supper at every public school to end youth hunger.

===== Gender & Sexuality =====
Kallos sponsored Drag Queen Story Hour to bring LGBTQ role models to read inclusive books to libraries in his district. In, Kallos introduced a student-written bill to require gender and sexuality education in New York City schools, with the stated goal of reducing bullying of LGBTQ students. The measure expanded Gender and Sexuality Alliance (GSA) clubs and required training for school staff on supporting LGBTQ and gender-nonconforming (GNC) students.

===== Digital Divide and Home Work Gap =====
In 2015, Kallos joined Letitia James in advocating for cable companies to offer low-cost high-speed Internet to low-income New Yorkers, as a way of bridging the digital divide. In 2017, Kallos and James won low-cost high-speed Internet for one million students on free and reduced lunch as well as seniors on Supplemental Security Income. Kallos then proposed legislation to force landlords to offer basic internet as a utility. Kallos backed efforts to close the homework gap through laptop distribution and online learning equity. Since then, the country has seen a wave of state laws based on the model for low-cost high-speed Internet for low-income families that Kallos and James won in New York.

===== Environment and climate change =====
In 2019, Kallos authored a declaration of climate emergency and passed it making New York City the largest city in the United States to do so. In 2018, Kallos introduced legislation to ban the sale of plastic water bottles in city parks and purchase by city agencies that Mayor de Blasio implemented by executive order in 2020. Kallos wrote the law in 2021 to ban toxic pesticides from being used in New York City parks.

===== Public Health, Nutrition, and Safety Net =====
In 2015, Kallos authored a law to allow low-income residents of New York City to automatically receive Supplemental Nutrition Assistance Program and other government social safety benefits. In 2016, Kallos worked with Intuit to release their Benefits Assist software as free and open-source software.

Kallos participated in public health initiatives aimed at improving access to healthy food, including funding Greenmarkets and Fresh Food Box programs, expanding Good Food Purchasing standards, and supporting efforts to modernize how residents receive public benefits. Kallos authored a law to create the Offices of Food Policy and Urban Agriculture. Kallos also supported reforms targeting the prevention of Legionnaires’ disease, including measures intended to reduce avoidable outbreaks and fatalities.

In 2016, Kallos, who is an ERISA attorney, authored legislation with Public Advocate Letitia James and Mayor Bill de Blasio for the city to automatically enroll employees in individual retirement accounts at no cost to employers who did not offer a retirement plan themselves. The law passed in 2021 and was then extended statewide.

=== Campaign for Manhattan Borough President ===
Kallos ran in the primary for the Democratic nomination in the 2021 Manhattan borough president election. In the first round, Kallos came in third place and was eliminated in the sixth round of the ranked-choice voting process.

=== White House ===
From March 2022 to October 2024, Kallos served as the Federal Data Sharing Lead in the United States Digital Service (USDS) within the Executive Office of the President. This work was under the Customer Experience Executive Order's "Facing Financial Shocks" life-experience initiative, which focused on making it easier for Americans to access social safety-net benefits. The Executive Order on Customer Experience signed by President Biden in December 2021, included language on pre-filled forms that mirrored language from the law Kallos wrote in 2015.

=== Counsel to Candidates and the Community ===
In 2024, Kallos launched a law firm representing candidates running for office in New York City as well as buildings and neighborhood groups. Kallos was able to help scale back a proposal from a house-museum seeking 17-bars to throw parties until 4AM.

During the 2025 elections, Kallos proposed several housing and affordability-related charter amendments, including the introduction of a vacancy tax, funding for repairs of rent-regulated units, the use of shelter funds to purchase market-rate housing, measuring affordability by local census block income, replacing lost rent-regulated apartments, and supporting community-led planning initiatives. Kallos then opposed the Mayor's ballot questions that ignored these proposals in favor of removing land use powers from the City Council.

== Election history ==
New York City Council: District 5
Election		Candidate	Party	Votes	Pct	Candidate	Party	Votes	Pct	Candidate	Party	Votes	Pct
2013	Primary election	Ben Kallos	Dem	7,513	45.92%	Micah Kellner	Dem	6,420	39.24%	Ed Hartzog	Dem	2,429	14.85%
2013	General election	Ben Kallos	Dem	18,135	57.06%	David Paul Garland	Rep	10,518	33.09%	Micah Kellner	WFP	3,118	9.81%
2017	Primary election	Ben Kallos	Dem	7,156	75%	Gwen Goodwin	Dem	1,411	15%	Patrick Bobilin	Dem	947	10%
2017	General election	Ben Kallos	Dem	22,514	81%	Frank Splotorno	Rep	5,419	19%				

Political offices
Preceded by Jessica Lappin	New York City Council, 5th district 2014–2020	Succeeded by Julie Menin
