= Charles E. F. Millard =

American businessman

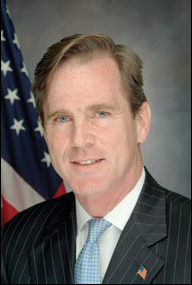

Director of the Pension Benefit Guaranty Corporation
- In office 2007–2009
- Preceded by: Bradley Belt
- Succeeded by: Joshua Gotbaum

President and CEO of the New York City Economic Development Corporation
- In office 1995–1999
- Appointed by: Rudy Giuliani
- Preceded by: Clay Lifflander
- Succeeded by: Michael Carey

Member of the New York City Council from the 5th district
- In office January 1, 1992 – December 1, 1995
- Preceded by: C. Virginia Fields
- Succeeded by: Gifford Miller

Personal details
- Born: 1959 (age 66–67)
- Party: Republican
- Spouse: Gwen
- Education: College of the Holy Cross (BA); Columbia University (JD)

Charles Edward Francis Millard (born March 1959) is an American lawyer and politician who served as the director of the Pension Benefit Guaranty Corporation (PBGC) from 2007 to 2009. Appointed by President George W. Bush, he was the corporation's first director to be named by a U.S. president and the first to be confirmed by the U.S. Senate.

Millard was previously the president and chief executive officer (CEO) of the New York City Economic Development Corporation, a state public-benefit corporation, and served as a member of the New York City Council from 1992 to 1995.

== Early life and education ==
Millard is a fourth-generation Irish American. His father, Charles E. F. Millard Sr. (1932–2003), was a businessman who was one of the youngest vice presidents of the advertising agency Benton & Bowles and later became the chairman and CEO of the Coca-Cola Bottling Company of New York (now Coca-Cola Enterprises).

Millard graduated from the College of the Holy Cross with a Bachelor of Arts, cum laude, in religious studies in 1979. He then earned his Juris Doctor (J.D.) with honors in 1985 from Columbia Law School, where he was a Harlan Fiske Stone Scholar.

== Private sector ==
Millard is currently the President of Cardinal Advisors, where he is a consultant and senior advisor for multiple companies, principally those involved in retirement policy-related business. He has written articles widely on the need for lifetime income solutions in 401k plans and in support of the democratization of access to alternative investments in 401k plans.

He has served as an advisor for Aries Management, Star Mountain Capital, Vitera Financial, McKinsey, AQR Capital, and Amundi. He is an independent, non-executive Director of Mount Logan, Re, a Bermuda-based reinsurance firm, and in the spring of 2024, after the Bermuda Monetary Authority appointed a Special Committee of independent Directors to address the problems at 777 Re, he was approved by the Bermuda Monetary Authority as an Independent Director and member of the Special Committee. and in the spring of 2024, after the Bermuda Monetary Authority appointed a Special Committee of Independent Directors to address problems at 777 Re, he was approved by the Bermuda Monetary Authority as an Independent Director and member of the Special Committee.

From 2011 through 2016 he was a managing director and Head of Global Pension Relations for Citigroup. In that role he led international pension conferences and was a leading speaker at numerous pension-related conferences around the country.

During this time, he was on the faculty at the Yale School of Management and taught on pensions and public policy.

In March 2016, Millard led the publication of the report "The Coming Pensions Crisis." This led to Millard's service on the "Project Expert Community," for the World Economic Forum's paper entitled "Investing in (and for) Our Future." The report was noteworthy for highlighting $78 trillion in unfunded retirement obligations in twenty countries of the Organisation for Economic Co-operation and Development (OECD). The report also advocated the development of more pooled defined contribution systems such as Collective Defined Contribution, Target Benefit, and Defined Ambition as methods increase retirement security.

Earlier in his career in the private sector, Millard served as a managing director at both Lehman Brothers and Prudential Securities, and immediately prior to joining the PBGC, Millard was a managing director at Broadway Partners in New York, and President of BP Direct Securities in New York.

He was also was an attorney with Davis Polk & Wardwell.

== Tenure at PBGC ==
Millard's tenure at PBGC was focused on reducing the corporation's long-term deficit through two initiatives-more aggressive stances in bankruptcy negotiations and greater diversification in the agency's investment policy.

Under his direction the agency took aggressive positions with General Motors and Delphi in the Delphi bankruptcy cases. Those actions resulted in substantial reduction in PBGC's deficit. Overall, during Millard's tenure, the corporation's deficit was reduced from $18 billion to $11 billion.

The PBGC is governed by a three-person Board, the Secretaries of Treasury, Commerce, and Labor. In February 2008, the Board adopted a new investment policy presented to it by Millard. The investment policy intended to put 45 percent of the corporation's $55 billion in equities, 45 percent in fixed income assets, and 10 percent in alternative investments. This would have tripled the chance that the agency would close its deficit. However, under new leadership in 2009, the PBGC froze the implementation of this investment policy. According to "Pensions and Investments", a trade publication, Ron Gebhardtsbauer, former PBGC actuary and head of the Actuarial Science Program at Penn State's Smeal College of Business, stated on June 16, 2010, "If the PBGC had followed Millard and invested in stocks in 2009, it could have $10 billion more in assets today."

== Public sector ==
From 1995 through 1999, under Mayor Rudolph Giuliani, Millard served as president and chief executive officer of the New York City Economic Development Corporation and Chairman of the New York City Industrial Development Agency. In that role, he concluded the relationship with numerous negotiations and transactions that led to the redevelopment of 42nd Street and Times Square. His work included negotiations with Reuters, Conde Nast headquarters tower, the New Amsterdam Theater, and numerous other sites up and down 42nd Street and Times Square.

In that role, he was the leader of the city's then-nascent tech sector known as "Silicon Alley". He was on the board of the city's successful venture capital fund (the Discovery Fund) and started two venture capital conferences. He was known as the "godfather of Silicon Alley".

He was responsible for negotiations with some of the city's largest employers including Merrill Lynch and AIG, to keep thousands of jobs in New York City.

As President of the EDC, he was also the landlord for multiple infrastructure facilities including the Howland Hook container port, Hunts Point Market, Fulton Fish Market, South Street Seaport and 10 million square feet of occupied real estate. He also privatized the then-city-owned United Nations Hotel. He reorganized the agency and created a system of performance reviews that resulted in numerous categories of improvement. He was twice elected to the New York City Council. He was the first Republican elected Councilman from Manhattan in 25 years. In that role he drafted the original legislation to eliminate pornography stores from many New York neighborhoods.

Millard also ran unsuccessfully for Congress in 1994 against Representative Carolyn Maloney.

In 1979–80, he worked as a VISTA volunteer in Crown Heights, Brooklyn, and in 1982–83, he served as Legislative Assistant for Foreign Affairs for legendaryCongresswoman Millicent Fenwick.

After law school he worked for the leading Human Rights Group in Chile, the Vicaria de la Solidaridad, during the regime of dictator Augusto Pinochet. He authored a report demonstrating the effectiveness of American human rights policies in reducing torture and other abuses by the government. In subsequent years, he published numerous Op Ed articles in opposition to the Pinochet administration's violations of human rights.

== Media contributions ==
He is a frequent commentator and contributor on matters of financial and retirement policy and has regularly appeared on CNN, Fox Business news, CNBC and has been published in Pensions & Investments, The Wall Street Journal, Bloomberg, and the Financial Times. Millard also wrote a regular column for the New York Post.

== Personal ==
Millard and his wife are parents of nine children.
