= The Promise of New York =

The Promise of New York is a 2009 documentary film documenting some less-well-known candidates in the New York City 2005 mayoral race.

== Synopsis ==
The film follows Seth Blum, a high-school math teacher, Andy Horwitz, a blogger and performer, and Christopher X. Brodeur, a political gadfly, as they attempt to collect petitions, get on the ballot, raise money and generally navigate the 2005 New York City mayor's race. They prowl the streets for signatures, crash debates and get arrested for allegedly threatening journalists.

== Production ==
It was directed and edited by Raul Barcelona and produced by Cassandra Hohn. The film received the Best Documentary Audience Choice award at the 31st Big Muddy Film Festival. It was exhibited simultaneously in New York City, released on DVD and on YouTube during the 2009 mayoral election to coincide with Michael R. Bloomberg's controversial bid for a third term.

The DVD special features contain footage from the campaigns of other less-well-known 2005 mayoral candidates which were also documented but that were left out of the final film, including Audrey Silk (Libertarian Party), Jimmy McMillan (Rent Is Too Damn High Party), Anthony Gronowicz (Green Party) and Theo Chino (Green Party).
