= Julie Menin =

American lawyer and businesswoman

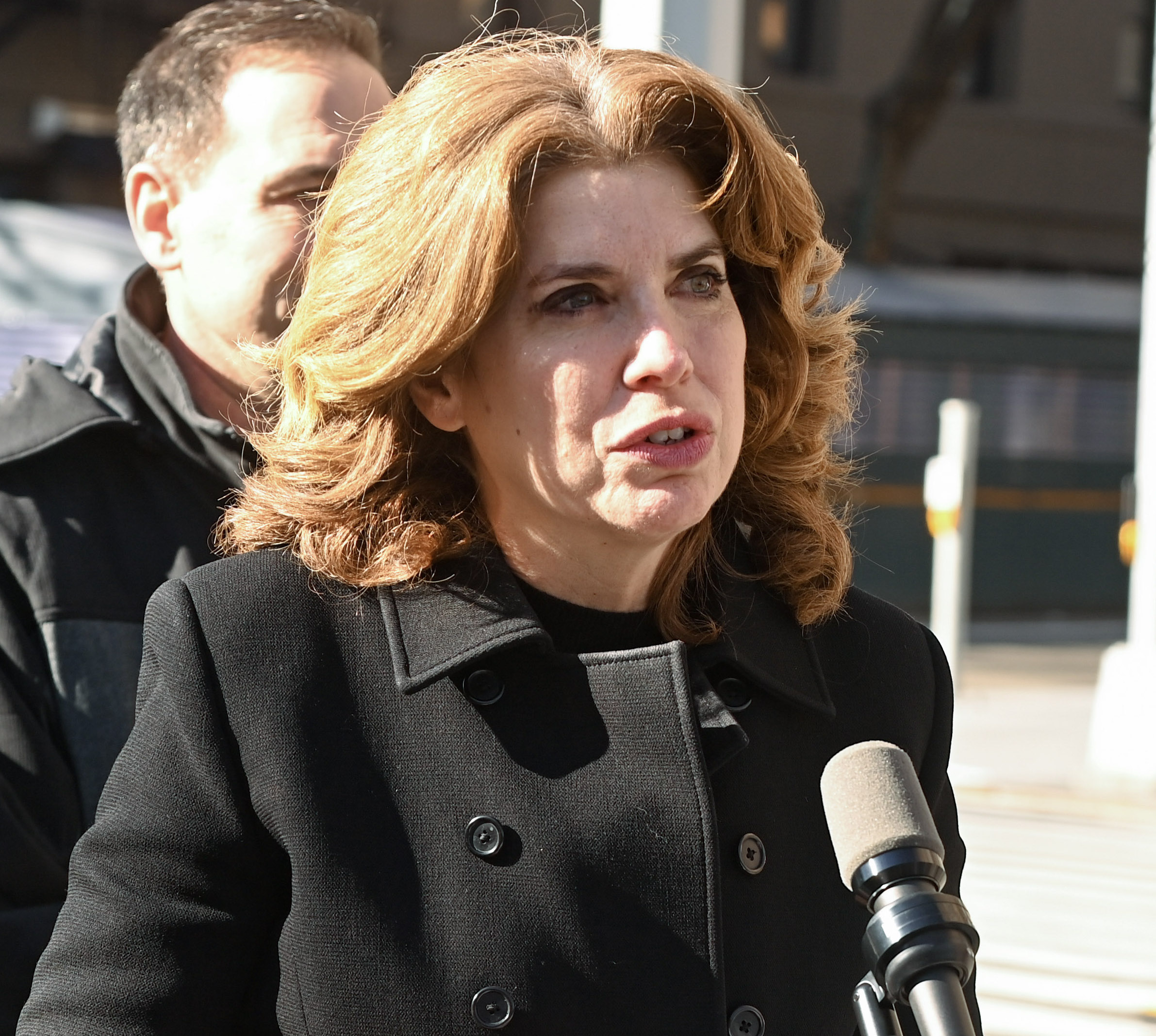

Speaker of the New York City Council
- Incumbent
- Assumed office January 7, 2026
- Deputy: Nantasha Williams
- Preceded by: Adrienne Adams

Member of the New York City Council from the 5th district
- Incumbent
- Assumed office January 1, 2022
- Preceded by: Ben Kallos

Director of the New York City Census
- In office 2019–2020

Commissioner of the New York City Mayor's Office of Media and Entertainment
- In office February 2016 – 2018
- Preceded by: Cynthia López

Commissioner of the New York City Department of Consumer Affairs
- In office 2014–2016
- Preceded by: Jonathan Mintz
- Succeeded by: Lorelei Salas

Chairperson of Manhattan Community Board 1
- In office 2005–2012

Personal details
- Born: Julie Lauren Jacobs; October 6, 1967 (age 59) New York City, New York, U.S.
- Party: Democratic
- Other political affiliations: Republican (formerly)
- Spouse: Bruce Menin (m. 1999)
- Children: 4
- Education: Columbia University (BA); Northwestern University (JD)
- Website: City Council website Campaign website

Julie Lauren Menin (née Jacobs; born October 6, 1967) is an American politician serving as the Speaker of the New York City Council. She has represented the 5th district since 2022, and previously worked as an attorney, civil servant, non-profit executive, professor and small business owner. In January 2019, she was appointed Director of the Census for NYC and Executive Assistant Corporation Counsel for Strategic Advocacy. Prior to this, she had worked as the Commissioner of the New York City Mayor's Office of Media and Entertainment and Commissioner of New York City's Department of Consumer Affairs.

== Early life and education ==
Julie Lauren Jacobs is the daughter of Agnes and Robert Jacobs.During World War II, her mother and maternal grandmother survived the Holocaust in Hungary, evading capture by hiding in a cellar in Budapest. At the same time, her maternal grandfather was targeted, captured, and murdered by the Nazi regime.

After the war, her mother and grandmother fled from Hungary when the Soviet Union took over the Hungarian government, across the border to Czechoslovakia. But when the Czechoslovak coup d'état took place in 1948, and the Czech government fell to Soviet communist control, they had to flee again. This time Julie's mother and relatives fled to Sydney, Australia, where they lived for 6 years.

In the mid-1950s, Agnes and her relatives then moved to New York City's neighborhood of Yorkville, or "Little Hungary", living in a rent-controlled apartment. Her mother was a painter, and her father was a radiologist.

Menin was born October 6, 1967, in Washington, DC, and is Jewish. She grew up in Washington, DC, and went to school in Bethesda, Maryland.

In the fall of 1985, Menin enrolled at Columbia University's undergraduate division, Columbia College. She pursued a Bachelor of Arts degree with a major in political science. Her interest in municipal governance was first sparked by a public policy course taught by professor Ester Fuchs. She graduated magna cum laude in the class of 1989. Decades later, she returned to campus to serve as an adjunct professor of law and public policy. Menin earned her Juris Doctor degree from Northwestern University School of Law in 1992.

== Career ==
Menin began her career in 1992 as a regulatory attorney at Wiley, Rein & Fielding in Washington D.C., where she represented clients in matters involving federal and state enforcement agencies. She later became Senior Regulatory Attorney at Colgate-Palmolive in New York City, where she played a lead role in numerous agency cases involving the Department of Justice, the Environmental Protection Agency, and the Federal Trade Commission, and also litigated disputes in state and federal courts. In 1999, she opened and operated Vine, a restaurant, market, and catering operation in lower Manhattan with more than 75 employees.

Following 9/11, Menin founded and was the president of the nonprofit Wall Street Rising, which worked for the recovery of the downtown neighborhood. She helped small businesses access grants, insurance, and other monetary aid; grew the organization to 30,000 members; and created a variety of programs, including the Retail Attraction Program, which helped more than 600 small businesses stay in lower Manhattan.

Under her leadership, the organization launched the "Music Downtown" and "Art Downtown" series, which provided cultural and entertainment amenities to local residents in an effort to revitalize Lower Manhattan. Menin worked with artists including Mikhail Baryshnikov on these programs.

=== Manhattan Community Board 1 ===
Beginning in 2005, Menin served as chairperson for Manhattan Community Board 1, where she was unanimously elected for three consecutive terms totaling seven years. As chair of CB1, Menin worked on numerous land use and zoning issues, led a successful campaign to build New York City's first "green" school and other initiatives to revitalize Lower Manhattan. Menin has been recognized for her "solution-based" approach to controversial issues in the wake of 9/11 and as chair of CB1. She successfully pushed to move the trial of Khalid Sheik Mohammed out of Lower Manhattan, while maintaining the importance of a federal trial.

On May 25, 2010, Menin presided over the Community Board's 29-1 vote in favor of a proposed Islamic cultural center and mosque, where she urged that an interfaith center (where all different religions can worship) be part of the plans. In 2011, Menin was praised for her efforts to balance the rights of Occupy Wall Street protesters with quality-of-life concerns of residents.

=== 2013 Manhattan Borough presidential election ===
Menin ran in the Democratic primary for Manhattan Borough President in September 2013 and lost to Gale Brewer. She finished fourth behind New York City Council Members Jessica Lappin and Robert Jackson. In 2017, Menin agreed to repay $201,000 as part of a settlement with the New York City Campaign Finance Board after the Board had conducted an audit of her 2013 campaign's financing and found a number of possible violations, including accepting donations over the legal limit, accepting donations from prohibited donors and unregistered political committees, and failing to disclose in-kind contribution, among others. Menin's campaign attorney told Politico "The pending settlement payment reflects the return of all funds that had remained in the 2013 campaign committee, plus Ms. Menin’s personal payment of $34.78. Again, no penalties were assessed and the settlement payment is not a penalty."

=== Commissioner of DCA ===
Under Menin's leadership from April 24, 2014 to February 2, 2016, the New York City Department of Consumer Affairs has launched initiatives to protect consumers from fraud, scams, and predatory conduct, and expanded the Agency's role in areas such as financial empowerment and investigative legal enforcement. DCA increased its consumer restitution by 72 percent from 2014 to 2015, returning money to consumers who have been victims of fraud, scams and predatory conduct. At DCA she also implemented New York City's paid sick leave law and launched a new Earned Income Tax Credit initiative that resulted in over $250 million being returned to low-income New Yorkers. During her tenure, fines assessed by DCA on small businesses were cut in half as she worked to make DCA more responsive and accessible to business owners' needs.

=== Mayor's Office of Media and Entertainment ===
From February 2, 2016 to January 2, 2019, Menin was appointed Commissioner of the Mayor's Office of Media and Entertainment, an agency that comprises the Office of Film, Theatre and Broadcasting and NYC Media. The Office of Film, Theatre and Broadcasting serves as a one-stop shop for the entertainment industry, a sector that contributes nearly $9 billion to the City of New York's economy and employs over 130,000 New Yorkers. NYC Media is responsible for managing and programming all of the media assets for the City of New York, which includes a television broadcast network reaching over 18 million people, a radio station and four local cable stations. Under her leadership, the agency saw record growth in both film projects and television series produced in the city. She negotiated the deal to bring the Grammy Awards back to New York after a 15-year absence, resulting in a $200 million benefit to New York City.

In 2016, the office launched a five-part initiative to support women both behind and in-front of the camera in film and television and in theater, the first of its kind for a U.S. city. That same year, Menin launched Made in NY Writers Room, a diversity initiative that awards fellowships and mentorship opportunities to traditionally under-represented television writers, and #NominateNYC, a campaign to increase diversity among the voting members of the Academy of Motion Picture Arts and Sciences. In an effort to reduce the carbon footprint of the film and television industry, Menin created NYC Film Green, an environmental initiative that promotes and recognizes sustainable practices on the sets of film and television productions.

=== Census for NYC ===
From January 2, 2019 to November 10, 2020, Menin was announced as Director of the Census for NYC and Executive Assistant Corporation Counsel for Strategic Advocacy by Mayor Bill de Blasio. Menin was responsible for organizing New York City's efforts to have every resident to participate in the 2020 Census. Menin and others successfully advocated against the Trump administration's attempt to add a citizenship question to the 2020 census.

The Census results captured a gain of 629,000 residents for New York City as the City grew more in total population than any other city in America. Menin is an adjunct professor at the School of International and Public Affairs, Columbia University. She served on the board of trustees of Columbia University.

=== New York City Council ===
Julie Menin speech at 2026 Knicks Championship Ceremony

In 2021, Menin was elected to represent the 5th District of the New York City Council, which encompasses the Upper East Side, East Harlem, Yorkville, Midtown East, Carnegie Hill, Sutton Place, Roosevelt Island, and Lenox Hill neighborhoods of Manhattan. In the 2021 Democratic primary, she garnered 56% of the vote in the final round of ranked choice voting, defeating Columbia University Director of Government Affairs Tricia Shimamura. She defeated Republican Mark Foley in the general election, winning over 75% of the vote.

In her first term, Menin served as Chair of the Council’s Small Business Committee. As Chair, she introduced and passed legislation that created a “One Stop Shop” to streamline small business interactions for all city agency permits and fines into one portal and ease regulatory burdens small businesses face.

Menin also introduced five of the bills as part of the historic package the Council passed to make New York City the first in the country to have Universal Childcare. In March 2023, Mayor Eric Adams moved forward with the implementation of Universal Childcare launching the first phase of MyCity Portal, which provided an eligibility screening tool and streamlined childcare application processes.

In 2024, Menin established a public-private partnership with the Gray Foundation to provide free swimming lessons to second graders throughout New York City as part of wider efforts to close racial disparities in learning to swim and reduce childhood drowning deaths. She also created a public-private partnership to address anti-semitism, which includes a free field trip to the Museum of Jewish Heritage for all eighth graders in New York City public and charter schools.

Menin chairs the Committee on Consumer and Worker Protection where she introduced and passed the Healthcare Accountability and Consumer Protection Act, legislation which created the nation’s first-ever municipal Office of Healthcare Accountability. Established in 2023 after the bill’s passage, the Office of Healthcare Accountability examines and publishes medical costs to provide increased transparency to patients. Studies show that this new office could save up to $2 billion a year in the City budget. Menin also serves as the New York City Council's Women's Caucus Co-Chair. Menin won re-election in 2023 and 2025.

In the time during and after the 2025 New York City Council election, Menin was seen as a frontrunner to be the Council's next Speaker. The field was thought to be narrowed down to Menin and Crystal Hudson of Brooklyn. On November 26, 2025, Menin announced she had the support of a supermajority of members of the council, which would make her the first Jewish Speaker.

On January 7, 2026, the New York City Council unanimously elected Julie Menin as Speaker. Menin is also the fourth woman and first Jewish person to serve as Speaker of the New York City Council.

In July 2026, Menin said she will not accept a salary increase if the City Council decides to increase the salaries of all citywide elected officials.

== Personal life ==
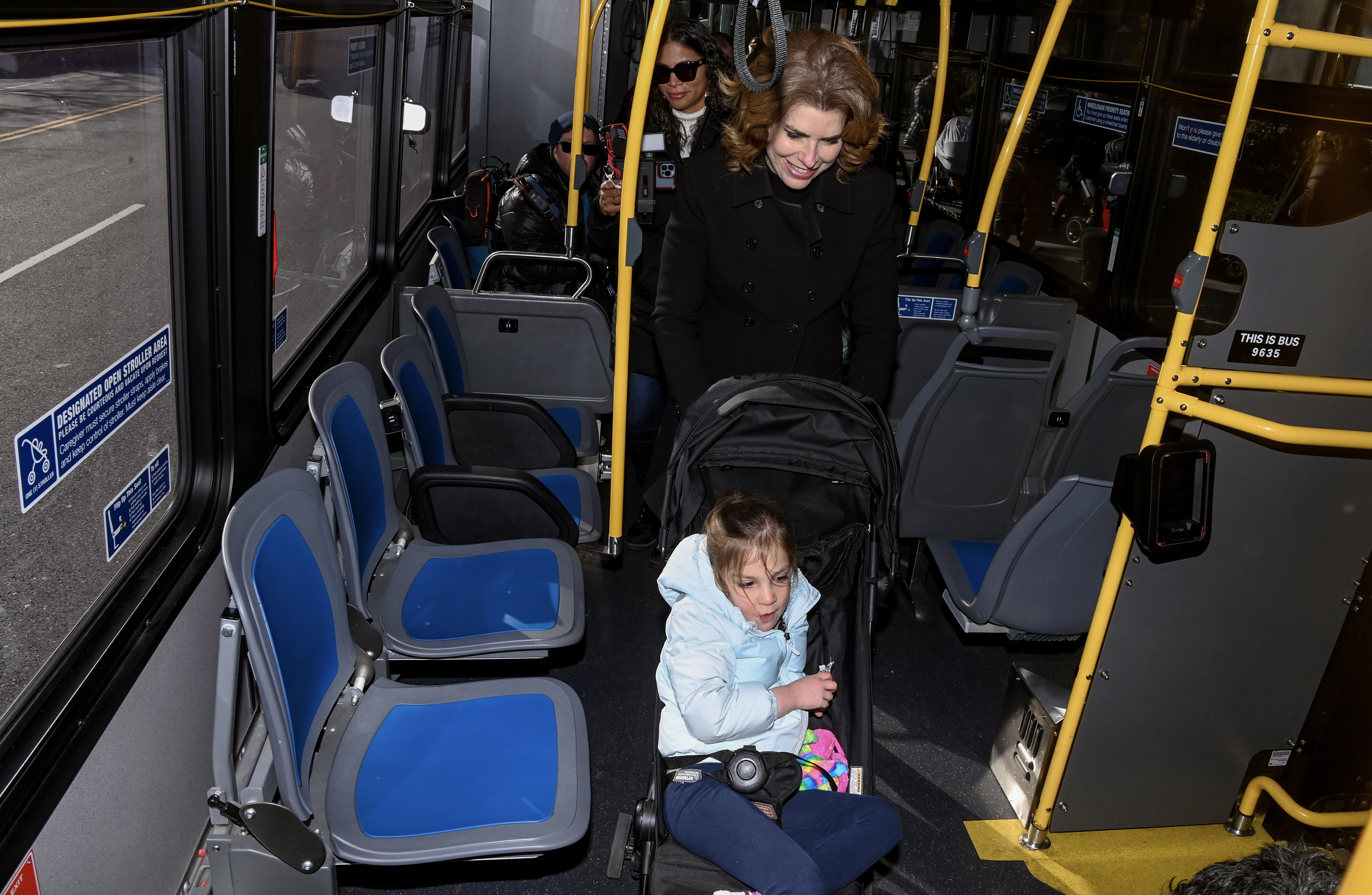
Menin on a bus in 2023.

In 1999, she married real estate developer Bruce Menin at the Metropolitan Club. She resides in Manhattan with her husband and four children. She and her husband own a $22 million mansion in the Hamptons and several luxury condos on the Upper East Side, however through a tax exemption for spouses, she reported less than $500,000 in assets and other income.

== Electoral history ==
=== 2025 ===
2025 New York City Council Democratic primary, District 5
Party	Candidate	Votes	%
Democratic	Julie Menin (incumbent)	24,773	73.2
Democratic	Collin L. Thompson	8,831	26.1
Write-in		252	0.7
Total votes		33,856	100.0

2025 New York City Council election, District 5
Party	Candidate	Votes	%
Democratic	Julie Menin (incumbent)	49,426	75.8
Republican	Alina Bonsell	17,423	23.9
Write-in		218	0.3
Total votes		67,067	100.0
Democratic hold			

=== 2023 ===
2023 New York City Council election, District 5
Party	Candidate	Votes	%
Democratic	Julie Menin (incumbent)	14,970	81.1
Republican	Elizabeth Golluscio	3,366	18.2
Write-in		131	0.7
Total votes		18,467	100.0
Democratic hold			

=== 2021 ===
2021 New York City Council Democratic primary, District 5
Party	Candidate	Maximum round	Maximum votes	Share in maximum round	Maximum votes First round votes Transfer votes
Democratic	Julie Menin	6	12,083	56.0%	
Democratic	Tricia Shimamura	6	9,485	44.0%	
Democratic	Rebecca N. Lamorte	5	4,699	20.3%	
Democratic	Kim Moscaritolo	4	3,534	14.8%	
Democratic	Billy Freeland	3	2,853	11.6%	
Democratic	Christopher A. Sosa	2	1,491	5.9%	
Democratic	Marco A. Tamayo	2	671	2.6%	
Write-In		1	78	0.3%	

2021 New York City Council election, District 5
Party	Candidate	Votes	%
Democratic	Julie Menin	25,365	75.8
Republican	Mark Foley	7,541	22.5
Liberal	Mark Foley	445	1.3
Total	Mark Foley	7,986	23.9
Write-in		113	0.3
Total votes		33,464	100.0
Democratic hold			

=== 2013 ===
2013 Manhattan borough president Democratic primary
Party	Candidate	Votes	%
Democratic	Gale Brewer	62,738	39.7
Democratic	Jessica Lappin	37,292	23.6
Democratic	Robert Jackson	30,873	19.6
Democratic	Julie Menin	26,992	17.1
Write-in		14	0.0
Total votes		157,909	100.0

Political offices
Preceded by Adrienne Adams	Speaker of the New York City Council; 2026–present	Incumbent
