= Micah Kellner =

American politician

- PFLAG Awards Luncheon, February 2010

Member of the New York State Assembly from the 76th district
- In office June 2007 – December 31, 2014
- Preceded by: Alexander Grannis
- Succeeded by: Rebecca Seawright

Personal details
- Born: December 5, 1978 (age 47) Morristown, New Jersey, U.S.
- Party: Conservative (currently) Democratic (while in office)
- Education: New York University
- Profession: Politician, legislator

Micah Z. Kellner (born December 5, 1978) is an American politician from the state of New York. A Democrat, he was formerly a member of the New York State Assembly from the 76th district, which includes Manhattan's Upper East Side and Roosevelt Island. Kellner was elected to the Assembly in 2007 and served until 2014, when he did not stand for reelection. In September 2013, he lost the primary election for the Democratic nomination for the New York City Council seat for the 5th District to attorney Ben Kallos. During his Assembly tenure, Kellner was admonished twice by Sheldon Silver, then the Assembly Speaker, based on findings that he had engaged in sexual harassment.

== Early life and career ==
An advocate for disabled people, Kellner was born with cerebral palsy. He attended the Pingry School, graduating in the class of 1997. He graduated from New York University in 2001 with a Bachelor of Fine Arts in film, television and radio. He worked as an aide to Senator Chuck Schumer, Congresswoman Carolyn B. Maloney and City Comptroller William C. Thompson before being elected to the Assembly in 2007.

== New York State Assembly ==
Following the appointment of Assemblyman Alexander "Pete" Grannis as Commissioner of New York State's Department of Environment Conservation early in 2007, Kellner was selected as the Democratic nominee for the special election held to fill the vacancy. In that election, held on June 5, 2007, he received 64% of the vote, comfortably defeating his Republican opponent.

During the 2013–14 term of the Legislature, Kellner became Chair of the Assembly Committee on Libraries and Education Technology. On June 27, 2013, Kellner chaired a hearing on "The Sale of Public Library Buildings in New York City" at which Pulitzer-Prize-winning author Edmund Morris testified against the New York Public Library's controversial Central Library Plan.

In August 2010, New York State's Governor, David Paterson, signed "Elle's Law," legislation introduced by Kellner that allows for the suspension of up to six months of the New York State driver's license of any driver inflicting serious physical injury on another person while committing a traffic violation. The law was named after Elle Vandenberghe, a three-year-old Upper East Side girl living in Kellner's district who was seriously injured after being struck by a motorist who was illegally backing through an intersection against a red light to find a parking space.

He also sponsored Oreo's Law in the New York State Assembly, which required the release of a shelter animal to a rescue group upon request of the rescue group prior to euthanasia of the animal. The law is named in memory of Oreo, a dog who survived abuse at the hands of her former owner, recovered from her injuries, but was then euthanized by the ASPCA in New York City, despite the offer of a No Kill sanctuary to guarantee her lifetime care.

== City Council campaign and admonition for sexual harassment ==
In early 2013, Kellner announced his intentions to run for the New York City Council seat in District 5 being vacated by Jessica Lappin. Initially, he received significant support, being endorsed by most local elected officials. In late June, however, the New York Post reported that he had accepted a campaign contribution from a taxi manufacturer whose handicapped-accessible vehicle was being considered for adoption by New York's Taxi and Limousine Commission.

On July 23, 2013, The New York Times reported that in 2009 Kellner had engaged in inappropriate Internet chat with a young female staffer. Kellner apologized in a statement to the Times, saying, "Over four years ago, for a few weeks while I was still single, I exchanged instant messages with a female member of my staff that were flirtatious. It was inappropriate. I was wrong and it was stupid. When I was told that my staffer felt the messages were unprofessional, I immediately stopped and regretted placing her in that position. I was sorry then and I am sorry now." The New York Daily News subsequently quoted an anonymous source identified only as a former Kellner staffer saying that Kellner had made life "horrible" for the other staffer after she had allegedly rebuffed his advances.

Following the media reports, several elected officials withdrew their endorsement of Kellner in the City Council race, including Lappin, Manhattan Borough President Scott Stringer, and two state senators (Jose Serrano and Brad Hoylman). The day after the allegations against Kellner were revealed, the New York City chapter of the National Organization for Women endorsed one of his two opponents in the Democratic primary for City Council, Benjamin Kallos. 32BJ SEIU rescinded its support as well, and endorsed Kallos, who went on to defeat Kellner in the September 10, 2013 primary.

In August 2013, the state's ethics commission launched an investigation into sexual harassment allegations against Kellner. That December, following an investigation by the Assembly Ethics Committee, Assembly Speaker Sheldon Silver publicly admonished Kellner for taking actions that created a hostile work environment; Silver also stripped Kellner of a committee chairship and banned him from hiring interns. On December 31, 2013, New York Governor Andrew Cuomo stated that Kellner should deny the sexual harassment allegations or resign.

In June 2014, Silver announced the closure of Kellner's Albany and district offices, and the elimination of Kellner's staffing budget, on the grounds that Kellner had "engaged in additional sexual harassment beyond the matters that were the subject of the 2013 investigation," as well as hired an intern in spite of being explicitly told he was prohibited from doing so.

== State committee and district leader ==
In 2014, two challengers announced they would run against Kellner's political club's state committee candidate. When the club's original candidate dropped out of a competitive Democratic primary, Kellner received his club's endorsement. Kellner characterized the win as a favor to his club, and not as an attempt at a political comeback. Following his victory for the obscure position, Kellner insisted it was a myth that he was not popular anymore in his district. Kellner won with nearly 57 percent of the votes in the three-way race.

In 2015, Kellner was re-nominated by his political club to run for re-election as district leader, an unpaid position he had held since 2012. Adam Roberts ultimately won the race, garnering 53% of the votes to Kellner's 47%.

As of July 2026, Kellner's X Profile identified him as a member of the Conservative Party of New York State.

== Personal life ==
Kellner is openly bisexual and was the first openly bisexual person elected to the New York State Assembly. His 2007 campaign won the support of the Gay & Lesbian Victory Fund, which provided financial and strategic assistance. In 2009, he received the Brenda Howard Award, which "recognizes an individual or organization whose work on behalf of the LGBT Community best exemplifies the vision, principles and community service of the late bisexual rights activist Brenda Howard, and who serves as a positive and visible role model for the Bisexual Community." He was one of six openly LGBT members of the New York Legislature, alongside Assemblymembers Deborah Glick, Daniel O'Donnell, Matthew Titone and Harry Bronson, as well as Senator Brad Hoylman. His 2011 marriage to Marie Ternes, a former chief of staff to Anthony Weiner, ended after she filed for divorce in 2013.

== Election results ==
- June 2007 special election, NYS Assembly, 65th AD

| Micah Z. Kellner (DEM - WOR) | ... | 4,254 |
| Gregory T. Camp (REP - IND) | ... | 2,273 |

- November 2008 general election, NYS Assembly, 65th AD

| Micah Z. Kellner (DEM - WOR) | ... | 36,682 |
| Georgiana Viest (REP) | ... | 11,636 |

- November 2010 general election, NYS Assembly, 65th AD

| Micah Z. Kellner (DEM - WOR) | ... | 22,741 |
| Michael K. Zumbluskus (REP) | ... | 7,998 |

- November 2012 general election, NYS Assembly, 76th AD

| Micah Z. Kellner (DEM - WOR) | ... | 34,040 |
| Michael K. Zumbluskus (REP) | ... | 10,689 |

- September 2013 primary election, Democratic Party, NYC Council, 5th District

| Ben Kallos | ... | 7,513 |
| Micah Z. Kellner | ... | 6,420 |
| Ed Hartzog | ... | 2,429 |

- November 2013 general election, NYC Council, 5th District

| Ben Kallos (DEM) | ... | 34,040 |
| David Paul Garland (REP - IND) | ... | 10,518 |
| Micah Z. Kellner (WOR) | ... | 3,118 |

- September 2014 primary election, Democratic Male State Committee, 76th AD

| Micah Z. Kellner | ... | 2,740 |
| Johnathan Piel | ... | 1,560 |
| Kerl Seidenwurm | ... | 516 |

- September 2015 primary election, Democratic Male District Leader, 76th AD, Part B

| Adam Roberts | ... | 433 |
| Micah Z. Kellner | ... | 383 |

New York State Assembly
| Preceded by Alexander "Pete" Grannis | New York State Assembly; 65th district 2007–2012 | Succeeded by Sheldon Silver |
New York State Assembly
| Preceded by Peter Rivera | New York State Assembly; 76th district 2013–2014 | Succeeded by Rebecca Seawright |
