= New York's 76th State Assembly district =

American legislative district

Assemblymember
Rebecca Seawright; D–Upper East Side

New York's 76th State Assembly district is one of the 150 districts in the New York State Assembly. It has been represented by Rebecca Seawright since 2015.

== Geography ==
District 76 is located in Manhattan, comprising portions of the Upper East Side, Roosevelt Island and Yorkville.

== Recent election results ==
=== 2026 ===
2026 New York State Assembly election, District 76
Party	Candidate	Votes	%
Democratic	Rebecca Seawright		
Working Families	Rebecca Seawright		
Total	Rebecca Seawright (incumbent)		
Republican	Louis Puliafito		
Write-in			
Total votes			100.0

=== 2024 ===
2024 New York State Assembly election, District 76
Party	Candidate	Votes	%
Democratic	Rebecca Seawright	46,962	
Working Families	Rebecca Seawright	3,546	
Total	Rebecca Seawright (incumbent)	50,508	98.9
Write-in		582	1.1
Total votes		51,090	100.0
Democratic hold			

=== 2022 ===
2022 New York State Assembly election, District 76
Primary election
Party	Candidate	Votes	%
Democratic	Rebecca Seawright (incumbent)	10,734	84.5
Democratic	Patrick Bobilin	1,910	15.0
Write-in		58	0.5
Total votes		12,702	100
General election
Democratic	Rebecca Seawright	35,053	
Working Families	Rebecca Seawright	2,990	
Total	Rebecca Seawright (incumbent)	38,043	98.8
Write-in		461	1.2
Total votes		38,504	100
Democratic hold			

=== 2020 ===
Due to COVID-19 quarantine measures, the Seawright campaign missed the deadline to submit signatures for the Democratic nomination. She instead ran on the "Rise and Unite" party line.

2020 New York State Assembly election, District 76
Party	Candidate	Votes	%
Rise and Unite	Rebecca Seawright (incumbent)	28,461	57.4
Republican	Louis Puliafito	14,919	
Liberal	Louis Puliafito	5,941	
Total	Louis Puliafito	20,860	42.1
Write-in		247	0.5
Total votes		49,568	100.0
Democratic hold			

=== 2018 ===
2018 New York State Assembly election, District 76
Party	Candidate	Votes	%
Democratic	Rebecca Seawright	39,967	
Working Families	Rebecca Seawright	1,657	
Total	Rebecca Seawright (incumbent)	41,624	96.0
Reform	Louis Puliafito	1,504	3.5
Write-in		228	0.5
Total votes		43,356	100.0
Democratic hold			

=== 2016 ===
2016 New York State Assembly election, District 76
Primary election
Party	Candidate	Votes	%
Independence	Jonathan Kostakopoulous	6	69.2
Write-in		4	30.8
Total votes		13	100
General election
Democratic	Rebecca Seawright	38,916	
Working Families	Rebecca Seawright	1,393	
Total	Rebecca Seawright (incumbent)	40,309	73.0
Republican	Jonathan Kostakopoulous	13,570	
Stop De Blasio	Jonathan Kostakopoulous	647	
Independence	Jonathan Kostakopoulous	634	
Total	Jonathan Kostakopoulous	14,851	26.9
Write-in		46	0.1
Total votes		55,206	100
Democratic hold			

=== 2014 ===
2014 New York State Assembly election, District 76
Primary election
Party	Candidate	Votes	%
Democratic	Rebecca Seawright	3,188	45.4
Democratic	Gus Christensen	2,620	37.3
Democratic	David Menegon	706	10.0
Democratic	Ed Hartzog	482	6.9
Write-in		31	0.4
Total votes		7,027	100
General election
Democratic	Rebecca Seawright	14,017	
Working Families	Rebecca Seawright	1,686	
Total	Rebecca Seawright	15,703	66.9
Republican	David Paul Garland	6,819	
Independence	David Paul Garland	585	
Dump the Dump	David Paul Garland	355	
Total	David Paul Garland	7,759	33.0
Write-in		28	0.1
Total votes		23,490	100
Democratic hold			

=== 2012 ===
2012 New York State Assembly election, District 76
Party	Candidate	Votes	%
Democratic	Micah Kellner	32,355	
Working Families	Micah Kellner	1,074	
Total	Micah Kellner (incumbent)	33,429	74.7
Republican	Michael Zumbluskas	10,698	
Independence	Michael Zumbluskas	632	
Total	Michael Zumbluskas	11,330	25.3
Write-in		17	0.0
Total votes		44,776	100.0
Democratic hold			
