= Rebecca Seawright =

American politician

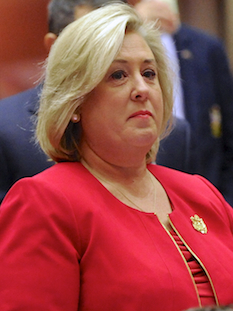

Member of the New York State Assembly from the 76th district
- Incumbent
- Assumed office January 1, 2015
- Preceded by: Micah Kellner

Personal details
- Born: April 24, 1962 (age 64) Texas, U.S.
- Party: Democratic
- Education: City University of New York (JD)
- Website: State Assembly website Campaign website

Rebecca Seawright is the Assembly member for the 76th District of the New York State Assembly. The district includes portions of the Upper East Side, Roosevelt Island and Yorkville in Manhattan.

== Life and career ==
Seawright formerly served as the New York State Director of the National Women's Political Caucus and a staffer in the New York State Assembly. She also worked in Washington, D.C., including for United States Senator Lloyd Bentsen.

Seawright serves on the boards of The Feminist Press at CUNY and the CUNY School of Law Board of Visitors.

== New York Assembly ==
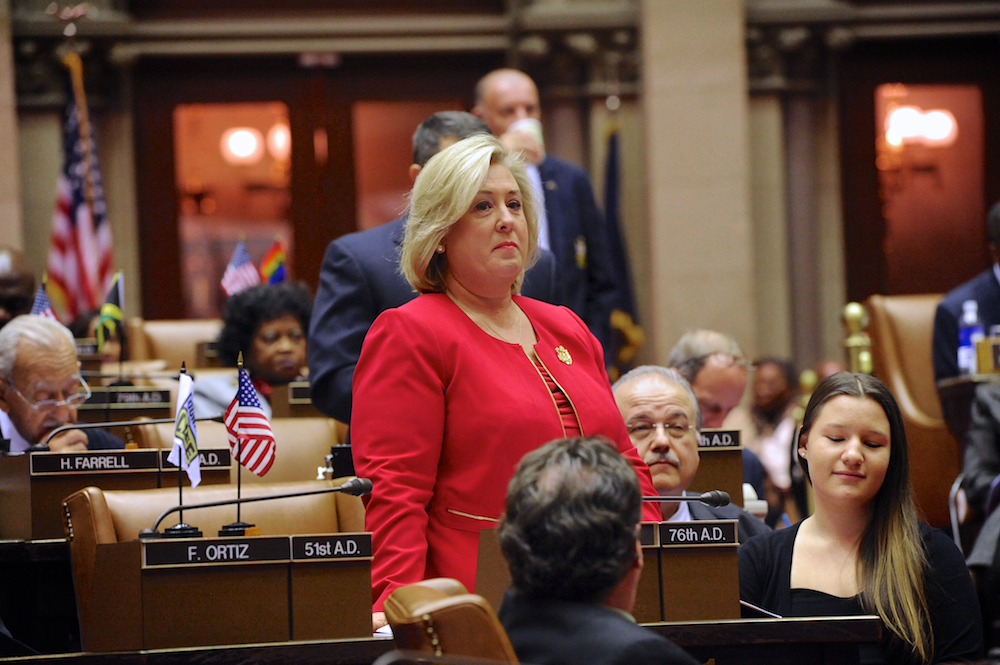
Assembly member Rebecca Seawright attending a legislative session.

Assemblyman Micah Kellner decided not to seek re-election in 2014, and Seawright entered the race to succeed him. She defeated three other candidates to receive the Democratic nomination. Seawright would go on to win the general election with nearly 67% of the vote.

Seawright was sworn into office on January 1, 2015. She is a member of the Banking, Consumer Affairs and Protection, Corporations, Authorities and Commissions, Judiciary, and Tourism, Parks, Arts, and Sports Development Committees. She is the Chair of the Subcommittee on Consumer Fraud Protection and also sits on the Assembly's Work group on operations. She is a member of the Legislative Women's Caucus and Bipartisan Pro-Choice Legislative Caucus.

=== 2020 office vandalism ===
In August 2020, Seawright's electoral office was vandalized with paint and an antisemitic note. Seawright is not Jewish, but was targeted for supposedly mentioning a synagogue in a fundraising letter. The suspect was later caught. The incident led to a collaboration with Speaker of the New York State Assembly Carl Heastie to create the Museum of Tolerance in New York City.
