= New York City Department of Parks and Recreation =

Government agency

Coordinates: 40°46′3.5″N 73°58′16.7″W

Department of Parks and Recreation

Department overview
- Formed: January 6, 1870; 156 years ago
- Preceding department: New York City Parks, Recreation and Cultural Affairs Administration
- Jurisdiction: New York City, New York, U.S.
- Headquarters: Arsenal, New York City, New York, 10065, U.S.
- Employees: 4,849 (FY 2026)
- Annual budget: $706.9 million (FY 2026)
- Department executives: Tricia Shimamura, commissioner of Parks and Recreation; Mark A. Focht, acting first deputy commissioner of Parks and Recreation
- Key document: New York City Charter
- Website: nycgovparks.org

The New York City Department of Parks and Recreation, also called the Parks Department or NYC Parks, is the department of the government of New York City responsible for maintaining the city's parks system, preserving and maintaining the ecological diversity of the city's natural areas, and furnishing recreational opportunities for city's residents and visitors.

NYC Parks maintains more than 1,700 public spaces, including parks, playgrounds and recreational facilities, across the city's five boroughs. It is responsible for over 1,000 playgrounds, 800 playing fields, 550 tennis courts, 35 major recreation centers, 66 pools, 14 miles (23 km) of beaches, and 13 golf courses, as well as seven nature centers, six ice skating rinks, over 2,000 greenstreets, and four major stadiums. NYC Parks also cares for park flora and fauna, community gardens, 23 historic houses, over 1,200 statues and monuments, and more than 2.5 million trees. The total area of the properties maintained by the department is over 30,000 acres (120 km^{2}). The largest single component of parkland maintained by the department is the 2,765-acre (1,119 ha) Pelham Bay Park in the Bronx. Other large parks administered by NYC Parks include Central Park in Manhattan, Prospect Park in Brooklyn, Van Cortlandt Park in the Bronx, Flushing Meadows–Corona Park in Queens, and the Staten Island Greenbelt.

NYC Parks produces many special events, including concerts and movie premieres. In the summer, the busiest season, the agency organizes free carnivals and concerts, and sends mobile recreation vans to travel throughout the five boroughs providing free rental equipment for skating, baseball, and miniature golf.

The symbol of the department is a cross between the leaf of the London plane and a maple leaf. It is prominently featured on signs and buildings in public parks across the city. The London plane tree is on NYC Parks' list of restricted use species for street tree planting because it constitutes more than 10% of all street trees.

== Agency ==
The department is a mayoral agency, headed by a commissioner who reports to the deputy mayor of operations. The current parks commissioner is Iris Rodriguez-Rosa, who was appointed on June 1, 2025. The current chair of the New York City Council Committee on Parks & Recreation is Shekar Krishnan.

The department is allocated an expense budget and a capital budget. The expense budget covers the total expenses incurred by the agency, including salaries. The capital budget is dedicated solely for new construction projects, as well as major repairs in parks that have a useful life of more than five years and cost at least $35,000.

Its regulations are compiled in Title 56 of the New York City Rules.

=== History ===
The original Parks Commission was formed in 1856 and was responsible only for Central Park. In 1870 the Tweed Charter gave it jurisdiction for all the parks in Manhattan. In addition, each borough had its independent Park Commission.

The history of the Park Enforcement Patrol Officers can be traced back to 1919, when the concept of the Parks Enforcement Patrol was first thought of by Bronx Parks Commissioner Joseph P. Hennessy, who reported in the "1919 Annual Report of the Department of Parks" the "necessity of a proper protective force" to be established. The following year in his 1920 annual report to the mayor, Hennessy once again pushed for a full-time park police force. On page 16 of the 1920 annual report, he wrote that "Vandalism is ever present. It can never be checked until the Parks Department has a force of keepers with police authority" and he recommended that the "Park protectors should be under control of Park Commissioners absolutely". In 1920, legislature was passed for the creation of a force of park keepers for NYC parks but the city refused to approve it and authorize funding.

In an effort to show the mayor the effectiveness of a park patrol force in hopes of having a full-time force established, Hennessy created volunteer park inspectors (later called "Auxiliary Park Inspectors") to patrol the Bronx parks during the day. According to his "1919 annual report of the Department of Parks", the first park inspector he appointed was Inspector William Blackie. Inspector Blackie was injured on Columbus Day 1919 while attempting to arrest two men poaching song birds in Van Cortlandt Park.

Despite the objection of the New York City Police Department, Hennessy established the first Park Patrol Harbor unit when he obtained two small motor boats from the Navy which he immediately put into service and had park staff patrol the waterways of the Hutchinson River.

In 1922, Hennessy (through his annual report) requested the mayor to establish special magistrates to deal with park related violations the same day the violator was arrested, provide police authority to the parks commissioners (each borough had a commissioner), and provide funding for a park patrol unit because the New York City Police officers "detailed to the Bronx parks in the summer on Saturdays, Sundays and holidays are not anxious to serve summonses or enforce the ordinances"

A unified citywide New York City Parks Department was formed in 1934 with Robert Moses as the commissioner, a position he held until 1960. In 1968 it was reorganized as the Parks, Recreation & Cultural Affairs Administration. In 1976 it was given its current name.

In 2001, the department underwent an investigation after the U.S. Attorney's Office received complaints from employees that they had suffered employment discrimination. The lawsuit alleged that NYC Parks violated the Civil Rights Act of 1964; according to the complaint, the NYC Parks' senior managers sought out and promoted whites to management positions without announcing job openings for those positions or conducting any formal interview processes. The complaint also said that since at least 1995, minorities have been significantly under-represented in NYC Parks' managerial ranks. In 2008, the City of New York agreed to pay a $21 million settlement to avoid going to trial.

=== Organization ===
- Commissioner of the Department of Parks and Recreation
  - General Counsel
    - Assistant Commissioner for Agency Compliance
  - Assistant Commissioner for Community Outreach and Partnership Development
  - Parks Advocate (Internal Investigative Officer)
  - Assistant Commissioner for Communications
  - Assistant Commissioner for Diversity, Equity, Inclusion, and Belonging
  - Inspector General, assigned by the New York City Department of Investigation
  - First Deputy Commissioner
    - Deputy Commissioner/Chief Operating Officer
      - Assistant Commissioner for Citywide Operations
      - Assistant Commissioner for Forestry, Horticulture, and Natural Resources
      - Bronx Parks Borough Commissioner
      - Brooklyn Parks Borough Commissioner
      - Manhattan Parks Borough Commissioner
      - Queens Parks Borough Commissioner
      - Staten Island Parks Borough Commissioner
  - Deputy Commissioner for Capital Projects
    - Assistant Commissioner for Architecture and Engineering Program Management
    - Assistant Commissioner for Landscape Program Management
  - Deputy Commissioner, Urban Park Service and Public Programs
    - Assistant Commissioner for Public Programs
    - Assistant Commissioner for Urban Park Service
  - Deputy Commissioner for Administration/Chief Administrative Officer
    - Assistant Commissioner for Budget and Fiscal Management
    - Assistant Commissioner for Innovation and Performance Management
  - Deputy Commissioner of Planning and Development
    - Assistant Commissioner for Concessions and Internal Audit

== Parks Enforcement Patrol ==
Patch of the NYC Parks Enforcement Patrol

The department maintains an enforcement division, called the Parks Enforcement Patrol (PEP), responsible for maintaining safety and security within the parks system. Parks Enforcement Patrol officers are employed as New York City special officer and have very limited peace officer status under New York state penal law. They are empowered through this status to make arrests and issue summons for park related offenses at New York City parks only. PEP officers patrol land, waterways and buildings under the jurisdiction of the Department of Parks and Recreation on foot, bicycle, horseback, boat and marked patrol trucks. PEP officers are also responsible for physical site inspections of NYC park concession facilities to assure the concessionaires compliance with state laws.

The New York City Police Department is the primary policing and investigation agency within New York City as per the NYC Charter, They respond to all incidents that occur at NYC Parks & facilities

=== Ranks ===
There are seven ranks of officers in the New York City Department of Parks & Recreation, Parks Enforcement Patrol:

| Title (rank) | Insignia | Uniform shirt color |
|---|---|---|
| Inspector | | White |
| Director | | White |
| Captain | | White |
| Sergeant | | White |
| Park Enforcement Officer/Urban Park Ranger | | Green (PEP) Gray (Rangers) |
| City Seasonal Aid/Security Guard | | Tan |
| Job Training Participant (JTPs) | | Tan |

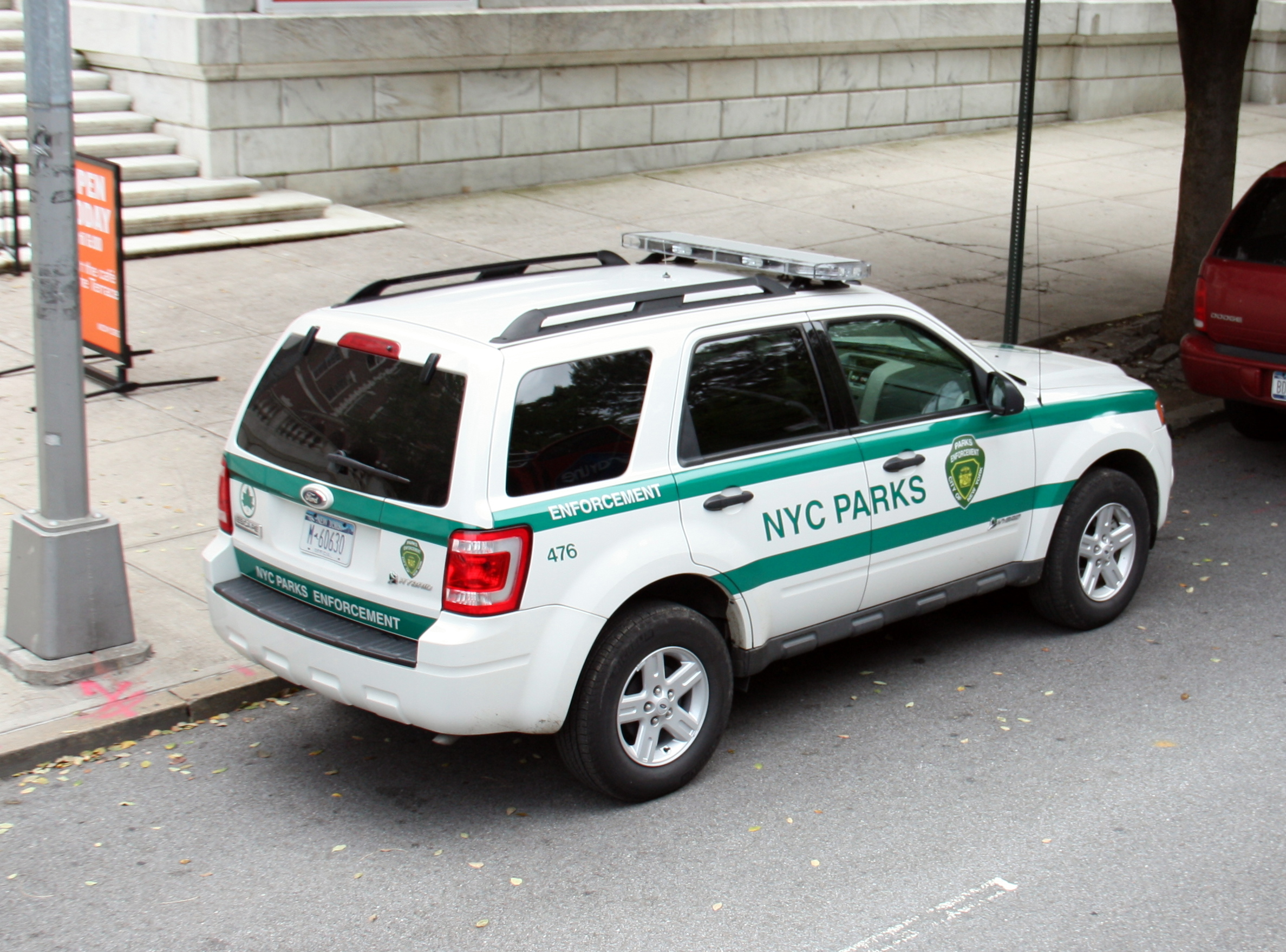
NYC PEP Ford patrol vehicle

=== Mounted auxiliary unit ===
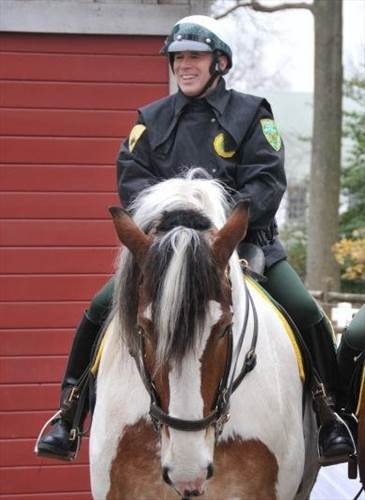
Auxiliary Officer

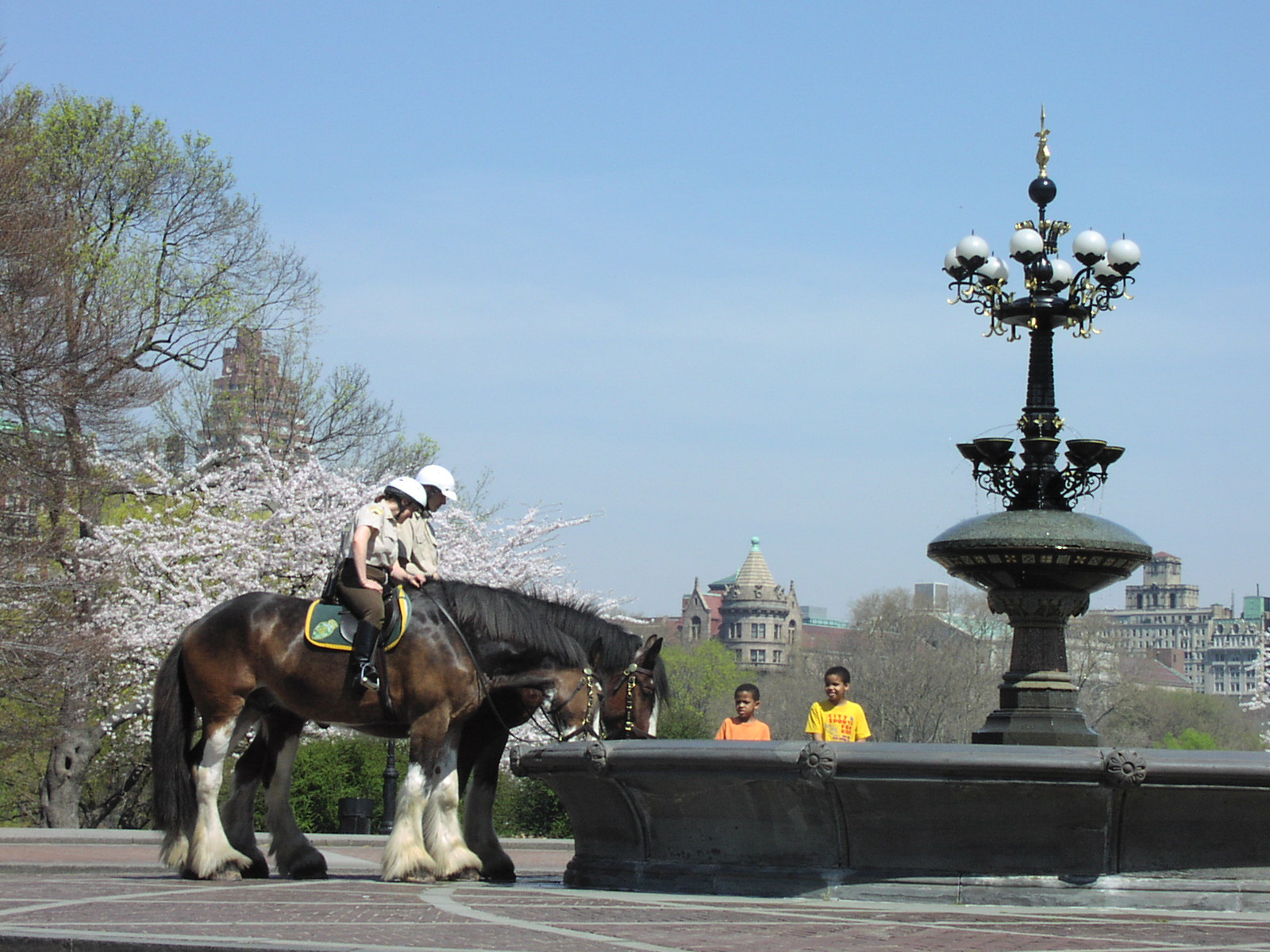
PEP horses drinking from a fountain in Central Park

Formed in 1996, the NYC Parks Enforcement Patrol Mounted Auxiliary Unit is a volunteer unit within the department. This unit is made up of private citizens who volunteer their time by working with officers of the Parks Enforcement Patrol.

Auxiliary officers patrol in uniform and on horseback in various NYC parks, and "ensure the preservation of the natural and living resources in the city's parks, as well as the safety of those utilizing the parks, by maintaining a clearly visible presence. They monitor areas that are not accessible by vehicle; they deter, identify and report illegal or unsafe activities that require Parks Enforcement Patrol or police attention; and they advise the public on park rules and regulations."

As an IRS 501C Corporation, the Auxiliary solicits funding to purchase horses, tack and provide training for both the Volunteers and the Professional Officers. Since inception it has provided several hundred thousand dollars towards the operation of the Mounted Unit, including the Capital Construction of a new barn. Former Parks Commissioner Adrian Benepe was quoted as saying "there is some doubt that the Parks Department could afford to run a mounted unit without the Mounted Auxiliary."

Auxiliary officers do not have powers beyond a citizen and cannot make arrests. For this reason a typical patrol will include a PEP Officer and an Auxiliary Officer. By combining the two, the manpower of the Parks Enforcement Patrol is significantly increased at no cost to the city. Should the team come upon a situation requiring enforcement, the PEP Officer can deal with it while the Auxiliary Officer covers the Officer's back and radios the situation to Parks Central and if needed will ask for additional help. "

== Union representation ==
Urban Park Rangers and Associate Urban Park Rangers (Sergeants) are represented by DC37 Local 983, a civil service employees union. The union is currently headed by President Joseph Puleo.

=== Park Security Service ===
The PEP also have a security trained service that provide participants with experience needed for future employment in the private sector.

== Urban Park Rangers ==
NYC Urban Park Ranger patch

The Urban Park Rangers was founded as a pilot program in 1979 by then Parks Commissioner Gordon J. Davis, with the support and encouragement of Mayor Ed Koch. The program provides many free programs year-round, such as nature walks and activities. They also operate programs such as The Natural Classroom for class trips and the general public alike. "Explorer" programs are available for activities such as canoeing in the city's flagship parks in all five boroughs. NYC Urban Park Rangers are easily identified by their uniforms.

Although NYC Park Rangers possess peace officer status, their primary mission is environmental education, protection of park resources, and visitor safety. Law enforcement in city parks is the responsibility of the New York City Police Department, and Parks Enforcement Patrol officers.

== Community Parks Initiative ==
The Community Parks Initiative was launched in 2014 and is providing $318 million of capital funding to improve more than 60 parks mainly located in densely populated neighborhoods where there are significant rates of poverty. The park improvements, such as Ranaqua Park in the South Bronx, consist of playground equipment, lighting, seating areas, water fountains, synthetic turn fields, trees and greenery, and rain gardens to collect storm water. The Longfellow Park renovation, also in the Bronx, is budgeted at $3.25 million and includes tree houses for children, bike racks, a sprinkler system for summer recreation, and a mini-state.

== Public-private partnerships ==
The New York City Department of Parks and Recreations maintains facilities and provides services through a network of public service workers, volunteers, and partnerships with private organizations.

The momentum for private partnerships increased dramatically during the mayoralty of Michael Bloomberg. Often the initiatives of Parks Commissioner Adrian Benepe were controversial.

=== Concessions ===
Most businesses that operate or generate revenue on New York City parkland are considered concessions and must obtain a permit or license from the Revenue Division of Parks. Pursuant to the City's Concession Rules, these licenses and permits are generally awarded through a public solicitation process, such as a Request for Bids (RFB) or Request for Proposals (RFP). Yorkville Sports Association (YSA) for three years operated the New City Parks Softball Concession that contributed hundreds of thousands of dollars to the City's General Fund.

Approximately 500 concessions currently operate in parks throughout the five boroughs, and they generally fall into two categories: food service and recreation. The food service concessions range from pushcarts selling hot dogs to restaurants such as Tavern on the Green and Terrace on the Park. Recreational concessions include facilities such as ice rinks, stables, marinas, and golf courses. In fiscal year 2009, NYC Parks' Revenue Division helped collect over $110 million in revenue from various sources including concessions, lease agreements, like those for Citi Field and Yankee Stadium, special events, and dockage.

=== Private partnerships ===
At the turn of the 20th century most of the staffing of New York City parks were patronage jobs. In the 1950s and 1960s, public sector unions organized most park workers which was considered at the time the first major political defeat of Robert Moses. During the city's fiscal crisis in the 1970s, the Department of Parks and Recreation City adapted practices such as using welfare recipients and volunteers to do work previously completed by unionized workers and to forge partnerships with nonprofit organizations and local sports leagues. Yorkville Sports (YSA) was one of those that helped maintain athletic fields prior to use and assumed responsibilities previously handled by the public sector. During this time the Central Park Conservancy and the Prospect Park Alliance were formed.

== GreenThumb ==
GreenThumb was created in 1978 to utilize vacant city owned land as garden spaces. By 1989 there were over 1,000 gardens. In the 1990s the program contracted as gardens were repurposed to build housing. Currently, there are over 550 gardens supported by GreenThumb.

== List of park commissioners ==
Since 1934, when New York City Parks Department Commissioners were unified, the directors have been:

| Portrait | Named individual | Start date | End date | Tenure | Mayor(s) served under |
|---|---|---|---|---|---|
| | Robert Moses | January 19, 1934 | May 23, 1960 | 26 years, 4 months | Fiorello H. La Guardia; William O'Dwyer; Vincent R. Impellitteri; Robert F. Wagner Jr. |
| | Newbold Morris | May 24, 1960 | January 15, 1966 | 5 years, 8 months | Robert F. Wagner Jr. |
| | Thomas Hoving | January 16, 1966 | March 15, 1967 | 1 year, 3 months | John V. Lindsay |
| | August Heckscher | March 16, 1967 | December 31, 1972 | 5 years, 9 months | John V. Lindsay |
| | Richard M. Clurman | January 1, 1973 | December 31, 1973 | 1 year | John V. Lindsay |
| | Edwin L. Weisl Jr. | January 1, 1974 | September 22, 1975 | 1 year, 9 months | Abraham Beame |
| | Alexander Wirin | September 23, 1975 | December 28, 1975 | 3 months | Abraham Beame |
| | Martin Lang | January 1, 1976 | June 30, 1977 | 1 year, 6 months | Abraham Beame |
| | Joseph P. Davidson | July 2, 1977 | January 20, 1978 | 6 months | Abraham Beame |
| | Gordon J. Davis | January 23, 1978 | April 1, 1983 | 5 years, 3 months | Ed Koch |
| | Henry J. Stern | April 2, 1983 | February 4, 1990 | 6 years, 10 months | Ed Koch |
| | Elisabeth F. Gotbaum | February 5, 1990 | December 31, 1993 | 3 years, 11 months | David Dinkins |
| | Henry J. Stern | January 1, 1994 | February 3, 2002 | 8 years, 1 month | Rudolph Giuliani |
| | Adrian Benepe | February 4, 2002 | August 29, 2012 | 10 years, 6 months | Michael Bloomberg |
| | Veronica M. White | August 30, 2012 | December 31, 2013 | 1 year, 4 months | Michael Bloomberg |
| | Liam Kavanagh | January 1, 2014 | May 12, 2014 | 5 months (Acting) | Bill de Blasio |
| | Mitchell Silver | May 12, 2014 | July 30, 2021 | 7 years, 2 months | Bill de Blasio |
| | Margaret Nelson (Acting) | August 2, 2021 | September 24, 2021 | 2 months | Bill de Blasio |
| | Gabrielle Fialkoff | September 24, 2021 | February 4, 2021 | 4 months | Bill de Blasio |
| | Liam Kavanagh | January 1, 2022 | February 4, 2022 | 1 month (Acting) | Eric Adams |
| | Susan Donoghue | February 4, 2022 | May 30, 2025 | 3 years, 4 months | Eric Adams |
| | Iris Rodriguez-Rosa | June 1, 2025 | January 17, 2026 | 7 months | Eric Adams |
| | Tricia Shimamura | January 17, 2026 | | | Zohran Mamdani |

== See also ==
- New York City Office of Administrative Trials and Hearings (OATH), for hearings conducted on summonses for quality of life violations issued by the Department
- List of New York City parks
- List of privately owned public spaces in New York City
- New York State Office of Parks, Recreation and Historic Preservation
