= C. Virginia Fields =

American politician

Clara A. L. Virginia Fields
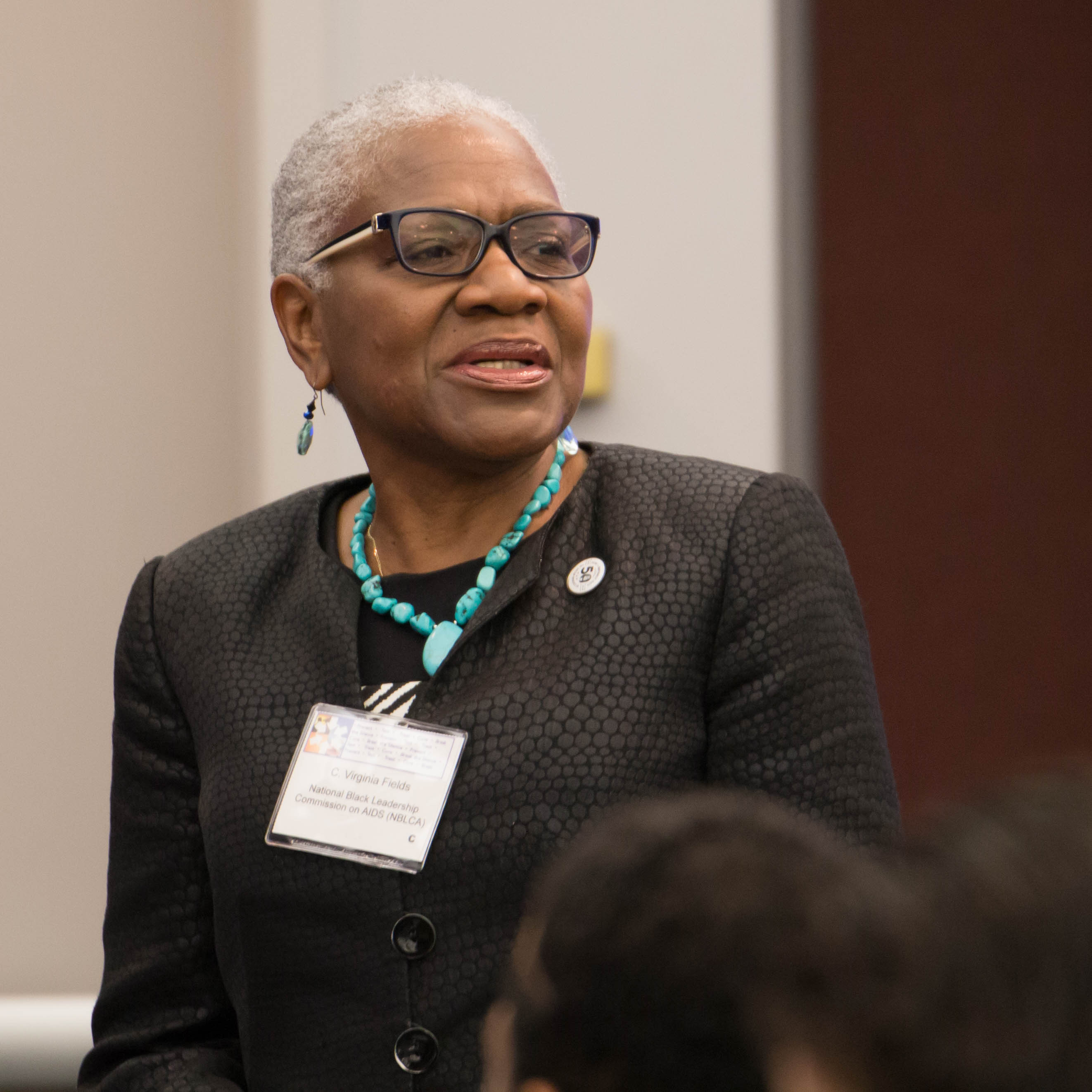
- Fields in 2015

25th Borough President of Manhattan
- In office January 1, 1998 – December 31, 2005
- Preceded by: Ruth Messinger
- Succeeded by: Scott Stringer

Personal details
- Born: Clara Virginia Clark; August 6, 1945 (age 81) Birmingham, Alabama, U.S.
- Party: Democratic
- Spouse: Henry Fields (m. 1971; div. 1985)
- Education: Knoxville College (1967); Indiana University (1969)

Clara A. L. Virginia Fields, better known as C. Virginia Fields (née Clark; born August 6, 1945), is an American politician who served as Borough President of Manhattan. She was served two terms, elected in 1997 and reelected in 2001, with her second term expiring at the end of 2005.

== Early life and education ==
Clara Virginia Clark was born in Birmingham, Alabama to Peter and Lucille Clark. She received a B.A. in sociology from Knoxville College in Tennessee in 1967 and an M.S.W. from Indiana University Bloomington in 1969. She married Henry Fields in 1971; they divorced in 1985. In 1971, she moved to New York City and became a social worker. In the late 1970s and 1980s she worked in a variety of administrative positions in the social services field, while also becoming involved in community politics.

Before being elected to public office, Fields was a professional social worker. She earned her masters in social work from the University of Indiana.

Fields was known for her activism during the height of the civil rights movement in which she participated in a number of protests and marches, thus beginning her foray into social and political advocacy. She is a member of Alpha Kappa Alpha. She helped register people to vote in Birmingham, Alabama during the 1960s.

== Political career ==
In 1989, Fields was elected to the New York City Council. In 1997, Fields was elected Manhattan Borough President, after Ruth Messinger served the maximum two terms.She became the first female African American borough president in New York City. Fields supported cultural organizations such as the New York Shakespeare Festival and the West Side Arts Coalition. She was in office during the September 11 attacks.

In 2005, Fields was a Democratic candidate for mayor of New York City. In early polls, she placed second to Bronx Borough President Fernando Ferrer. She received criticism for her campaign's perceived lack of policy-based motivation, with some critics pointing to the term limits of her position at the time as the real impetus for her campaign. It was discovered that her campaign literature included photographs doctored to create the impression of diversity in support. Fields never found traction and in the primary she finished third with 15.92% of the vote. Fields finished behind former Bronx Borough President Fernando Ferrer and Congressman Anthony Weiner, but ahead of City Council Speaker Gifford Miller.

In March 2006 it was reported that Fields would run for the State Senate seat representing Harlem and parts of Upper Manhattan, being vacated by Senate Minority Leader David Paterson. (Paterson ran for lieutenant governor on a ticket headed by State Attorney General Eliot Spitzer who was running for governor.) On June 1, 2006, Fields announced that she was ending her Senate campaign, explaining that it was not the right time for her to run.

== Post-political career ==
Fields became president and CEO of the non-profit organization, National Black Leadership Commission on AIDS (NBLCA) in 2008. During her tenure the organization rebranded itself as the National Black Leadership Commission on Health ("Black Health") and broadened its focus to include other diseases that disproportionately affect Black Americans. She retired as president and CEO of Black Health in June 2024. New York City Mayor Eric Adams designated June 19, 2024 as C. Virginia Fields Day, which coincided with the National Juneteenth Holiday.

== See also ==
- Government of New York City

== Bibliography ==
- Paterson, David Black, Blind, & In Charge: A Story of Visionary Leadership and Overcoming Adversity. New York, New York, 2020
- John C. Walker,The Harlem Fox: J. Raymond Jones at Tammany 1920:1970, New York: State University New York Press, 1989.
- David N. Dinkins, A Mayor's Life: Governing New York's Gorgeous Mosaic, PublicAffairs Books, 2013
- Rangel, Charles B.; Wynter, Leon (2007). And I Haven't Had a Bad Day Since: From the Streets of Harlem to the Halls of Congress. New York: St. Martin's Press.
- Baker Motley, Constance Equal Justice Under The Law: An Autobiography, New York: Farrar, Straus, and Giroux, 1998.
- Howell, Ron Boss of Black Brooklyn: The Life and Times of Bertram L. Baker Fordham University Press Bronx, New York 2018
- Jack, Hulan Fifty Years a Democrat:The Autobiography of Hulan Jack New Benjamin Franklin House New York, NY 1983
- Clayton-Powell, Adam Adam by Adam:The Autobiography of Adam Clayton Powell Jr. New York, New York 1972
- Pritchett, Wendell E. Robert Clifton Weaver and the American City: The Life and Times of an Urban Reformer Chicago: University of Chicago Press 2008
- Davis, Benjamin Communist Councilman from Harlem:Autobiographical Notes Written in a Federal Penitentiary New York, New York 1969

| Preceded by Hilton Clark | New York City Council, 5th district 1990–1992 | Succeeded by Charles Millard |
| Preceded by Wendell Foster | New York City Council, 9th district 1992–1997 | Succeeded by Bill Perkins |
| Preceded by Ruth Messinger | Borough President of Manhattan; 1998-2005 | Succeeded by Scott Stringer |
