= New York City's 5th City Council district =

- Boundaries following the 2020 census

Government
  - Councilmember: Julie Menin (D—Yorkville)

Population (2010)
  - Total: 161,269

Demographics
  - White: 78%
  - Asian: 10%
  - Hispanic: 7%
  - Black: 3%
  - Other: 2%

Registration
  - Democratic: 60.6%
  - Republican: 13.5%
  - No party preference: 22.2%
- Registered voters (2021) 134,893

New York City's 5th City Council district is one of 51 districts in the New York City Council. It is currently represented by Democrat Julie Menin.

== Geography ==
District 5 is based largely in Manhattan's Upper East Side, also covering Roosevelt Island and a small portion of East Harlem.

The district overlaps with Manhattan Community Boards 6, 8, and 11, and is contained almost entirely within New York's 12th congressional district with a small extension into the 13th district. It also overlaps with the 28th, 29th, and 30th districts of the New York State Senate, and with the 68th, 73rd, and 76th districts of the New York State Assembly.

== Recent election results ==
=== 2025 ===
2025 New York City Council election, District 5
Primary election
Party	Candidate	Votes	%
Democratic	Julie Menin (incumbent)	24,773	73.2
Democratic	Collin Thompson	8,831	26.1
Write-in		252	0.7
Total votes		33,856	100.0
General election
Democratic	Julie Menin (incumbent)	49,426	73.7
Republican	Alina Bonsell	17,243	26.0
Write-in		217	0.3
Total votes		67,066	100.0
Democratic hold			

=== 2023 (redistricting) ===
Due to redistricting and the 2020 changes to the New York City Charter, councilmembers elected during the 2021 and 2023 City Council elections will serve two-year terms, with full four-year terms resuming after the 2025 New York City Council elections.

2023 New York City Council election, District 5
Party	Candidate	Votes	%
Democratic	Julie Menin (incumbent)	14,970	81.1
Republican	Elizabeth Golluscio	3,366	18.2
Write-in		131	0.7
Total votes		18,467	100.0
Democratic hold			

=== 2021 ===
In 2019, voters in New York City approved Ballot Question 1, which implemented ranked-choice voting in all local elections. Under the new system, voters have the option to rank up to five candidates for every local office. Voters whose first-choice candidates fare poorly will have their votes redistributed to other candidates in their ranking until one candidate surpasses the 50 percent threshold. If one candidate surpasses 50 percent in first-choice votes, then ranked-choice tabulations will not occur.

2021 New York City Council election, District 5 Democratic primary
Party	Candidate	Maximum round	Maximum votes	Share in maximum round	Maximum votes First round votes Transfer votes
Democratic	Julie Menin	6	12,083	56.0%	
Democratic	Tricia Shimamura	6	9,485	44.0%	
Democratic	Rebecca Lamorte	5	4,699	20.3%	
Democratic	Kim Moscaritolo	4	3,534	14.8%	
Democratic	Billy Freeland	3	2,853	11.6%	
Democratic	Christopher Sosa	2	1,491	5.9%	
Democratic	Marco Tamayo	2	671	2.6%	
Write-in		1	78	0.3%	

An interactive map of District 5

2021 New York City Council election, District 5 general election
Party	Candidate	Votes	%
Democratic	Julie Menin	25,365	75.8
Republican	Mark Foley	7,541	
Liberal	Mark Foley	445	
Total	Mark Foley	7,986	23.8
Write-in		113	0.4
Total votes		33,464	100
Democratic hold			

=== 2017 ===
2017 New York City Council election, District 5
Primary election
Party	Candidate	Votes	%
Democratic	Ben Kallos (incumbent)	7,847	74.6
Democratic	Gwen Goodwin	1,582	15.0
Democratic	Patrick Bobilin	1,044	9.9
Write-in		45	0.5
Total votes		10,518	100
General election
Democratic	Ben Kallos	21,945	
Working Families	Ben Kallos	1,489	
Total	Ben Kallos (incumbent)	23,434	80.2
Republican	Frank Spotorno	5,679	19.4
Write-in		112	0.4
Total votes		29,225	100
Democratic hold			

=== 2013 ===
2013 New York City Council election, District 5
Primary election
Party	Candidate	Votes	%
Democratic	Ben Kallos	7,513	45.9
Democratic	Micah Kellner	6,420	39.2
Democratic	Ed Hartzog	2,429	14.8
Write-in		5	0.0
Total votes		16,367	100
General election
Democratic	Ben Kallos	18,135	57.1
Republican	David Paul Garland	9,443	
Dump the Dump	David Paul Garland	467	
Independence	David Paul Garland	390	
Libertarian	David Paul Garland	175	
Liberal	David Paul Garland	24	
Save 2nd Avenue	David Paul Garland	19	
Total	David Paul Garland	10,518	33.1
Working Families	Micah Kellner	3,118	9.8
Write-in		12	0.0
Total votes		31,783	100
Democratic hold			

=== 2009 ===
2009 New York City Council election, District 5
Party	Candidate	Votes	%
Democratic	Jessica Lappin	21,327	
Working Families	Jessica Lappin	1,158	
Total	Jessica Lappin (incumbent)	22,485	74.4
Republican	Stephen Kaufman	6,759	
Independence	Stephen Kaufman	957	
Total	Stephen Kaufman	7,716	25.6
Write-in		3	0.0
Total votes		30,204	100
Democratic hold			
