= Tricia Shimamura =

Commissioner of the New York City Department of Parks and Recreation

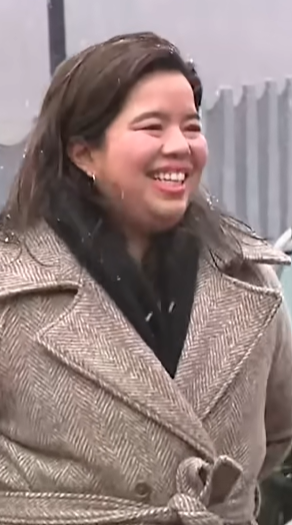
- Shimamura in 2026

Commissioner of the New York City Department of Parks and Recreation
- Incumbent
- Assumed office January 17, 2026
- Mayor: Zohran Mamdani

Personal details
- Party: Democratic
- Education: Kenyon College (BA), New York University (MSW)

Tricia Shimamura is an American social worker, political aide, and civil servant who has served as the Commissioner of the New York City Department of Parks and Recreation since 2026, when she was appointed by Mayor Zohran Mamdani to the role. She previously served as the Commissioner of Parks and Recreation for Manhattan in the Department of Parks and Recreation, the Director of Community Relations to Manhattan Borough President Mark Levine, and in other notable affiliated roles, and was a candidate for New York City Council in 2021, losing to Julie Menin.

== Biography ==
Shimamura earned a BA from the Kenyon College in Ohio and went on to earn her Masters in Social Work from NYU.

She worked as Deputy Chief of Staff to then-Congresswoman Carolyn Maloney until 2015, when she became Director of Government Affairs for Columbia University. She ultimately left that role in 2022 to become Director of Community Relations to Mark Levine.

She served as Vice-Chair of the Manhattan Community Board 8, which she was appointed to by Gale Brewer. She ran for New York City Council in the 2021 New York City Council election, but lost the primary to Julie Menin.

She serves on the board of Vote Mama. She also founded nonprofit She Will Rise NYC.

In 2024, she became the Commissioner of Parks and Recreation for Manhattan in the Department of Parks and Recreation, where she oversaw the response to the Inwood Hill Park fire and the reopening of the East River Park. In 2026, she was appointed Commissioner of the New York City Department of Parks and Recreation by Mayor Zohran Mamdani. The selection earned praise from both allies and political opponents, including Menin, Levine, and Brewer.

As Parks Commissioner, she created a "Summer of Soccer" program including soccer games, screenings, and celebrations in honor of the 2026 FIFA World Cup, and expanded free swimming lessons. She has emphasized vastly increasing free and low-cost classes, events, and access for NYC residents. She has also pushed forward investments in parks in underserved neighborhoods and in beaches, including reopening the Orchard Beach Pavilion.
