= Jessica Lappin =

American politician

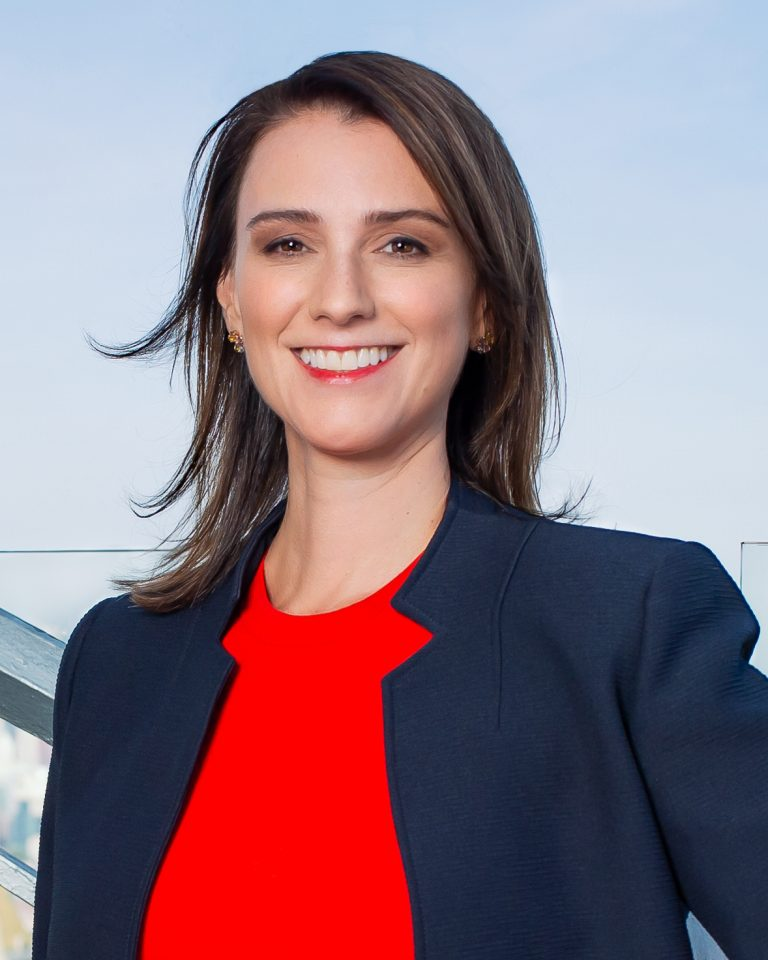
- Jessica Lappin poses at SAGA, a restaurant within the Lower Manhattan business improvement district at 70 Pine (2021).

Member of the New York City Council from the 5th district
- In office January 1, 2006 – December 31, 2013
- Preceded by: Gifford Miller
- Succeeded by: Benjamin Kallos

Personal details
- Born: Jessica Suzanne Lappin; April 25, 1975 (age 51)
- Party: Democratic
- Spouse: Andrew Wuertele (m. 2003)
- Education: Georgetown University
- Profession: Businessperson

Jessica S. Lappin (born April 25, 1975) is a New York City business leader and a former member of the New York City Council from the 5th district. In 2014, she became the president of the Alliance for Downtown New York, a Business Improvement District.

== Career ==
On February 3, 2014, Lappin was appointed as president at the Alliance for Downtown New York, the organization that manages the Downtown-Lower Manhattan Business Improvement District. Lappin also serves as the President of its sister organization, the Downtown-Lower Manhattan Association.

== Political career ==
Lappin served two terms as a member of the New York City Council, representing Manhattan's fifth district, which includes the Upper East Side, East Midtown, and Roosevelt Island. She previously worked as a senior adviser and District Chief of Staff to Gifford Miller, the former Speaker of the New York City Council and representative of Manhattan's fifth district. She also ran in the Democratic Primary for Manhattan Borough President in 2013 and finished in second place.

== Personal life ==
Lappin, who is Jewish, was raised in Manhattan. She graduated from Stuyvesant High School and attended Georgetown University, graduating magna cum laude.

Lappin married Andrew Wuertele in 2003.

The couple has two children.
