= Manhattan Community Board 8 =

Manhattan Community District 8
- Community District
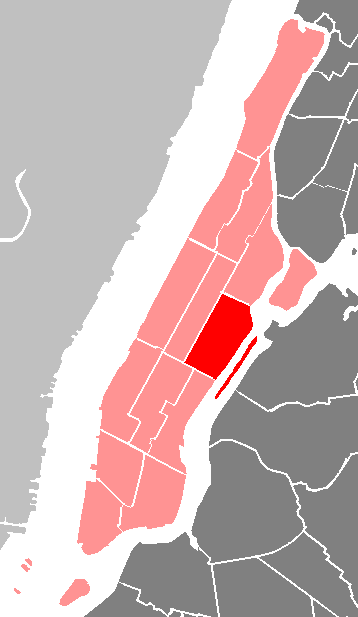
- Country: United States
- State: New York
- City: New York City
- Borough: Manhattan
- Neighborhoods: Upper East Side including: Carnegie Hill; Lenox Hill; Roosevelt Island; Yorkville

Government
  - Chairperson: Valerie Mason
  - District Manager: Ian McKnight

Area
  - Land: 2 sq mi (5.2 km^{2})

Population (2020)
  - Total: 231,983
  - Density: 120,000/sq mi (45,000/km^{2})

Ethnicity
  - Hispanic: 9.7%
  - African-American: 2.3%
  - White: 75.3%
  - Asian: 10.2%
  - Others: 2.5%
- Time zone: UTC−5 (Eastern)
  - Summer (DST): UTC−4 (EDT)
- ZIP codes: 10021, 10028, 10044, 10065, 10075, and 10128
- Area code: 212, 646, and 332, and 917
- Police Precinct: 19th (website)
- Website: www.cb8m.com

The Manhattan Community Board 8 is a New York City community board encompassing the Upper East Side, including the neighborhoods of Lenox Hill, Yorkville, and Roosevelt Island in the borough of Manhattan. It is delimited by the East River on the east, 59th Street on the south, Central Park on the west and 96th Street on the north.

Its current Chair is Valerie Mason and its District Manager is Ian McKnight. Former members include Tricia Shimamura.

== Demographics ==
As of 2000, the Community Board had a population of 217,063, up from 210,880 in 1990 and 204,305 in 1980. Of them (as of 2000), 179,355 (82.6%) were White non-Hispanic, 6,907 (3.2%) were African-American, 13,778 (6.3%) Asian or Pacific Islander, 126 (0.1%) American Indian or Native Alaskan, 618 (0.3%) of some other race, 3,952 (1.5%) of two or more races, 3,253 (6.0%) of Hispanic origins. 4.8% of the population benefitted from public assistance as of 2009, up from 2.8% in 2000.

The land area is 1,267 acres, or 2 square miles (5.2 km^{2}).
