= Christopher X. Brodeur =

American musician, artist and writer

Christopher X. Brodeur is an artist, writer, and musician. Brodeur has been acquitted and found not guilty after being arrested and spending time in jail for harassing members of New York City's mayor's press office staff. He ran for mayor of New York City in 2001, after losing to Julia Willebrand in the Green Party primary, and in 2005 he won 4% in the Democratic Party primary.
