= New York City's 6th City Council district =

- Boundaries following the 2020 census

Government
  - Councilmember: Gale Brewer (D—Upper West Side)

Population (2010)
  - Total: 163,820

Demographics
  - White: 72%
  - Hispanic: 11%
  - Asian: 9%
  - Black: 6%
  - Other: 2%

Registration
  - Democratic: 69.8%
  - Republican: 8.7%
  - No party preference: 18.6%
- Registered voters (2021) 148,461

New York City's 6th City Council district is one of 51 districts in the New York City Council. It is currently represented by Democrat Gale Brewer, who took office in 2022. Brewer previously represented the district from 2002 to 2013, and served as Borough President of Manhattan in between her two Council stints.

== Geography ==
District 6 is nearly coterminous with Manhattan's Upper West Side, also covering a small section of Hells Kitchen. Central Park, Manhattan's largest park and the most visited urban park in the country, is located in the district, as is the lower half of Riverside Park.

The district overlaps with Manhattan Community Boards 4 and 7, and is contained entirely within New York's 12th congressional district. It also overlaps with the 27th, 29th, 30th, and 31st districts of the New York State Senate, and with the 67th, 69th, and 75th districts of the New York State Assembly.

== Recent election results ==
=== 2025 ===
2025 New York City Council election, District 6
Party	Candidate	Votes	%
Democratic	Gale Brewer	53,543	
Working Families	Gale Brewer	7,264	
Total	Gale Brewer (incumbent)	60,807	98.1
Write-in		1,181	1.8
Total votes		61,988	100.0
Democratic hold			

=== 2023 (redistricting) ===
Due to redistricting and the 2020 changes to the New York City Charter, councilmembers elected during the 2021 and 2023 City Council elections will serve two-year terms, with full four-year terms resuming after the 2025 New York City Council elections.

2023 New York City Council election, District 6
Party	Candidate	Votes	%
Democratic	Gale Brewer (incumbent)	18,196	81.4
Republican	Diane di Stasio	3,529	
Clean Up NY	Diane di Stasio	381	
Total	Diane di Stasio	3,910	17.5
Medical Freedom	Barbara Simpson	147	0.7
Write-in		90	0.4
Total votes		22,343	100.0
Democratic hold			

=== 2021 ===
In 2019, voters in New York City approved Ballot Question 1, which implemented ranked-choice voting in all local elections. Under the new system, voters have the option to rank up to five candidates for every local office. Voters whose first-choice candidates fare poorly will have their votes redistributed to other candidates in their ranking until one candidate surpasses the 50 percent threshold. If one candidate surpasses 50 percent in first-choice votes, then ranked-choice tabulations will not occur.

An interactive map of District 6

2021 New York City Council election, District 6
Primary election
Party	Candidate	Votes	%
Democratic	Gale Brewer	21,594	54.8
Democratic	Maria Danzilo	5,834	14.8
Democratic	Sara Lind	5,166	13.1
Democratic	Jeffrey Omura	3,922	9.9
Democratic	David Gold	1,867	4.7
Democratic	Zack Weiner	959	2.4
Write-in		57	0.1
Total votes		39,399	100.0
General election
Democratic	Gale Brewer	35,792	86.9
Republican	Nancy Sliwa	5,194	12.6
Write-in		191	0.5
Total votes		41,177	100
Democratic hold			

=== 2017 ===
2017 New York City Council election, District 6
Primary election
Party	Candidate	Votes	%
Democratic	Helen Rosenthal (incumbent)	13,529	64.9
Democratic	Mel Wymore	6,446	30.9
Democratic	Cary Goodman	824	4.0
Write-in		49	0.2
Total votes		20,848	100
General election
Democratic	Helen Rosenthal	29,518	
Working Families	Helen Rosenthal	2,771	
Total	Helen Rosenthal (incumbent)	32,289	86.9
Republican	Hyman Drusin	3,731	10.0
Stand Up Together	William Raudenbush	973	2.6
Write-in		153	0.5
Total votes		37,146	100
Democratic hold			

=== 2013 ===
2013 New York City Council election, District 6
Primary election
Party	Candidate	Votes	%
Democratic	Helen Rosenthal	7,716	26.8
Democratic	Mel Wymore	6,440	22.4
Democratic	Marc Landis	5,566	19.4
Democratic	Noah Gotbaum	3,512	12.2
Democratic	Ken Biberaj	2,645	9.2
Democratic	Debra Cooper	2,482	8.6
Democratic	Aaron Braunstein	387	1.3
Write-in		1	0.0
Total votes		28,749	100
General election
Democratic	Helen Rosenthal	29,586	78.2
Republican	Harry Demell	4,928	13.0
Working Families	Marc Landis	2,538	6.7
Green	Thomas Siracuse	737	1.9
Write-in		26	0.1
Total votes		37,815	100
Democratic hold			

== Previous councilmembers ==
- Hugh Quinn (1949–1957)
- James Dulligan (1957)
- Eric J. Treulich (1957–1964)
- John J. Santucci (1964–1965)
- David B. Friedland (1965–1976)
- Arlene Stringer (1976–1977)
- Stanley Michels (1977–1991)
- Ronnie Eldridge (1991–2001)
- Gale Brewer (2002–2013)
- Helen Rosenthal (2014–2021)
