= Gale Brewer =

American politician

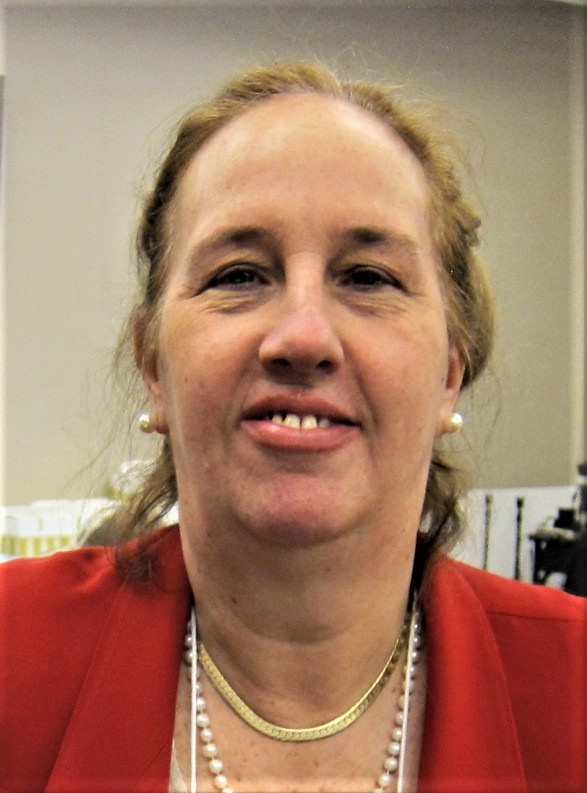

Member of the New York City Council from the 6th district
- Incumbent
- Assumed office January 1, 2022
- Preceded by: Helen Rosenthal
- In office January 1, 2002 – December 31, 2013
- Preceded by: Ronnie Eldridge
- Succeeded by: Helen Rosenthal

27th Borough President of Manhattan
- In office January 1, 2014 – December 31, 2021
- Preceded by: Scott Stringer
- Succeeded by: Mark Levine

Personal details
- Born: September 6, 1951 (age 75)
- Party: Democratic
- Spouse: Cal Snyder
- Education: Bennington College (BA); Harvard University (MPA); Columbia University (BA)
- Website: City Council website

Gale Arnot Brewer (born September 6, 1951) is an American Democratic politician from the state of New York who has represented the 6th New York City Council district since January 2022, a position she previously held from 2002 to 2013. From January 2014 to December 2021, she served as the 27th Borough President of the New York City borough of Manhattan.

== Education ==
Brewer graduated from the Winsor School in Boston in 1969, and then obtained a bachelor's from Bennington College in 1973 and a Master of Public Administration from Harvard University's John F. Kennedy School of Government in 1990. She then earned a second bachelor's from the Columbia University School of General Studies in 1997.

== Career in government ==
From 1975 to 1978, Brewer served as director of scheduling for Mary Anne Krupsak, the former Lieutenant Governor of New York. From 1978 to 1990, she was chief of staff to then-New York City Council member Ruth Messinger. From 1990 to 1994, Brewer was director of the New York City Office of Federal Relations in New York in the administration of David Dinkins. From 1994 to 1998, she was Deputy Public Advocate for Intergovernmental Affairs under Mark Green.

Brewer then served as Project Manager for the NYC Nonprofits Project and worked with the Telesis Corporation, a private firm that builds affordable housing. She was a member of Manhattan's Community Board 7 and Chair of the New York State chapter of the National Women's Political Caucus. In 2000, she was cited by the New York Daily News as #20 of "50 New Yorkers to Watch".

== Political career ==
=== New York City Council (2002–2013) ===
Brewer began serving on the New York City Council in 2002. She represented the 6th district. In each re-election vote in 2003, 2005, and 2009, she received over 80% of the votes cast.

Brewer has helped to pass legislation protecting domestic workers, establishing the New York City Broadband Advisory Committee, establishing an electronic death registration system and requiring New York City publications to be made available via the Internet, as well as two bills aimed at eliminating graffiti and unwanted stickers. In 2010, Brewer introduced the first Ranked Choice Voting (RCV) bill. Ranked Choice Voting was later passed in New York City in November 2019 when the Charter Revisions Commission put forth a referendum before NYC voters, which passed with nearly 75% of the vote. Ranked Choice Voting was first used in a New York City election in February of 2021. New York State is one of a minority of states that allow Rank Choiced Voting in local elections in some jurisdictions.

Brewer chaired the Select Committee on Technology in Government (now the Committee on Technology) from 2002 to 2009 In June 2004, in conjunction with a graduate student Digital Opportunities Team at CUNY Hunter College departments of Urban Affairs and Planning supervised by Professor Lisa Tolliver, the committee published a study and recommendations titled Expanding Digital Opportunity in New York City Public Schools: Profiles of Innovators and Leaders Who Make a Difference. The report was one of numerous initiatives and events implemented by the Select Committee, which included roundtables, conferences, hearings, and collaborative partnerships.

=== Manhattan Borough President (2014–2021) ===
Ineligible to run for re-election to the City Council in 2013 because of term limits, in February 2013, Brewer announced she would run for Manhattan Borough president. On September 10, 2013, Brewer won the Democratic primary, taking nearly 40% of the vote in a four-way race. Brewer won the general election on Tuesday, November 5, 2013, and assumed office in January 2014.

Brewer was re-elected Manhattan Borough President in 2017. Due to term limits for borough presidents, she was ineligible to seek re-election in 2021.

In the 2020 United States presidential election, Brewer served as an alternate elector, replacing Christine Quinn.

=== New York City Council (2022–present) ===
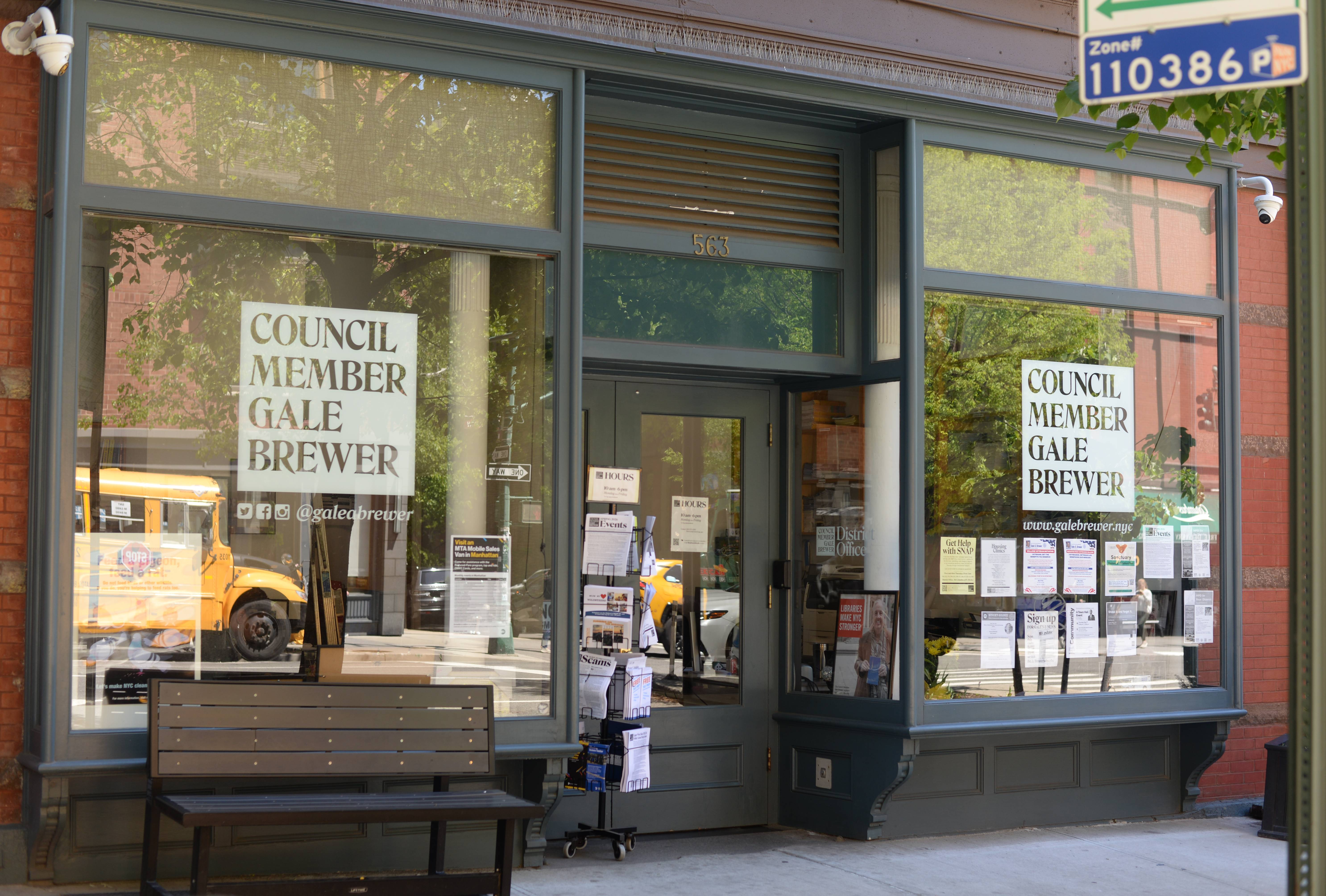
Brewer's office on the Upper West Side.

In December 2020, Brewer announced her candidacy for her former City Council seat in the 2021 New York City Council election. She lost the Jim Owles Liberal Democratic Club endorsement to Democrat Sara Lind and requested a second endorsement vote from the organization prior to the June Democratic Primary in 2021. On November 2, 2021, Brewer defeated Republican Nancy Regula (wife of Curtis Sliwa) with over 82% of the vote. Brewer's main progressive Democratic primary challenger in 2021, Sara Lind, was not reappointed to Manhattan Community Board 7 when her position came up for renewal in 2023.

Brewer chairs the City Council's Committee on Oversight and Investigations. She is a member of the Committees on Consumer and Worker Protection, Finance, Governmental Operations, Higher Education, and Rules, Privileges, and Elections. In addition, she is a member of the Manhattan Delegation, the Women's Caucus, and sits on the Budget Negotiating Team. She left the Progressive Caucus in 2023, and returned in 2026.

Brewer successfully ran for the City Council's new 6th district seat in 2023.

In May 2026, Brewer opposed a bill that would ban 24-hour "live-in shifts" by workers caring for disabled people, agreeing with the goal of the bill, but saying she was concerned about its unintended effects.

In July 2026, Brewer headed a committee hearing to authorize a raise in salary for all citywide elected officials by 18 percent. She said other major cities in the United States have raised their officials' salaries with smaller budgets and there are New York City government staffers who get paid more than the mayor.

Brewer is a member of the Vote Blue Coalition, a progressive group and federal PAC created to support Democrats in New York, New Jersey, and Pennsylvania through voter outreach and mobilization efforts.

== Honors and awards ==
In 2018, the Metropolitan College of NY awarded Gale Brewer an honorary doctorate citing her "long career on critical issues facing New York City from affordable housing and land use to health care and workers rights".

== Personal life ==
Brewer is married to Cal Snyder. Their son, Mo Sumbundu, works for Empire State Development. In 2023, Sumbundu was appointed by Governor Kathy Hochul to the Buffalo State University Council. Brewer has had several foster children.

== Electoral history ==
=== 2025 ===
2025 New York City Council election, District 6
Party	Candidate	Votes	%
Democratic	Gale Brewer	53,543	86.4
Working Families	Gale Brewer	7,264	11.7
Total	Gale Brewer (incumbent)	60,807	98.1
Write-in		1,183	1.9
Total votes		61,990	100.0
Democratic hold			

=== 2023 ===
2023 New York City Council election, District 6
Party	Candidate	Votes	%
Democratic	Gale Brewer (incumbent)	18,196	81.4
Republican	Diane di Stasio	3,529	15.8
Clean Up NY/Arts & Culture	Diane di Stasio	381	1.7
Total	Diane di Stasio	3,910	17.5
Medical Freedom	Barbara A. Simpson	147	0.7
Write-in		90	0.4
Total votes		22,343	100.0
Democratic hold			

=== 2021 ===
2021 New York City Council Democratic primary, District 6
Party	Candidate	Votes	%
Democratic	Gale Brewer	21,594	54.8
Democratic	Maria Danzilo	5,834	14.8
Democratic	Sara Lind	5,166	13.1
Democratic	Jeffrey Omura	3,922	10.0
Democratic	David Gold	1,867	4.7
Democratic	Zachary Tov Weiner	959	2.4
Write-in		57	0.1
Total votes		39,399	100.0

2021 New York City Council election, District 6
Party	Candidate	Votes	%
Democratic	Gale Brewer	35,792	86.9
Republican	Nancy Sliwa	5,194	12.6
Write-in		191	0.5
Total votes		41,177	100.0
Democratic hold			

=== 2017 ===
2017 Manhattan borough president election
Party	Candidate	Votes	%
Democratic	Gale Brewer	194,237	76.6
Working Families	Gale Brewer	16,495	6.5
Total	Gale Brewer (incumbent)	210,732	83.2
Republican	Frank Scala	30,410	12.0
Green	Daniel Vila Rivera	7,373	2.9
Libertarian	Brian Waddell	3,430	1.4
Reform	Brian Waddell	1,209	0.5
Total	Brian Waddell	4,639	1.8
Write-in		276	0.1
Total votes		253,430	100.0
Democratic hold			

=== 2013 ===
2013 Manhattan borough president Democratic primary
Party	Candidate	Votes	%
Democratic	Gale Brewer	62,738	39.7
Democratic	Jessica Lappin	37,292	23.6
Democratic	Robert Jackson	30,873	19.6
Democratic	Julie Menin	26,992	17.1
Write-in		14	0.0
Total votes		157,909	100.0

2013 Manhattan borough president election
Party	Candidate	Votes	%
Democratic	Gale Brewer	202,966	82.7
Republican	David B. Casavis	37,421	15.3
Independence	David B. Casavis	2,371	1.0
Libertarian	David B. Casavis	1,392	0.6
Dump the Dump	David B. Casavis	976	0.4
Total	David B. Casavis	42,160	17.2
Write-in		199	0.1
Total votes		245,325	100.0
Democratic hold			

=== 2009 ===
2009 New York City Council election, District 6
Party	Candidate	Votes	%
Democratic	Gale Brewer	26,359	76.2
Working Families	Gale Brewer	2,059	5.9
Total	Gale Brewer (incumbent)	28,418	82.1
Republican	Joshua J. Goldberg	6,190	17.9
Write-in		2	0.0
Total votes		34,610	100.0
Democratic hold			

=== 2005 ===
2005 New York City Council election, District 6
Party	Candidate	Votes	%
Democratic	Gale Brewer	29,345	77.3
Working Families	Gale Brewer	1,747	4.6
Total	Gale Brewer (incumbent)	31,092	81.9
Republican	Joshua E. Yablon	6,852	18.1
Total votes		37,944	100.0
Democratic hold			

=== 2003 ===
2003 New York City Council election, District 6
Party	Candidate	Votes	%
Democratic	Gale Brewer	17,421	76.1
Working Families	Gale Brewer	2,183	9.5
Total	Gale Brewer (incumbent)	19,604	85.7
Republican	Joshua E. Yablon	2,761	12.1
Independence	Joshua E. Yablon (Note: Shared with "West Side Leadership" ballot line.)	347	1.5
Conservative	Joshua E. Yablon	175	0.8
Total	Joshua E. Yablon	3,283	14.3
Write-in		1	0.0
Total votes		22,888	100.0
Democratic hold			

=== 2001 ===
2001 New York City Council Democratic primary, District 6
Party	Candidate	Votes	%
Democratic	Gale Brewer	13,512	58.2
Democratic	Anna R. Lewis	4,473	19.3
Democratic	Michael E. Brown	1,648	7.1
Democratic	Larry Sauer	1,641	7.1
Democratic	Jason S. Haber	1,334	5.7
Democratic	Ron Foley	488	2.1
Write-in		137	0.6
Total votes		23,233	100.0

2001 New York City Council election, District 6
Party	Candidate	Votes	%
Democratic	Gale Brewer	31,452	69.9
Working Families	Gale Brewer	855	1.9
Liberal	Gale Brewer	831	1.8
Green	Gale Brewer	489	1.1
Total	Gale Brewer	33,627	74.8
Republican	David R. Herz	9,364	20.8
Independence	Anna R. Lewis	1,496	3.3
Libertarian	Gary Snyder	478	1.1
Write-in		1	0.0
Total votes		44,966	100.0
Democratic hold			

== Notes ==
Political offices
Preceded by Scott Stringer	Borough President of Manhattan; 2014–2022	Succeeded by Mark Levine
