= David B. Friedland =

American lawyer and politician (1903–1976)

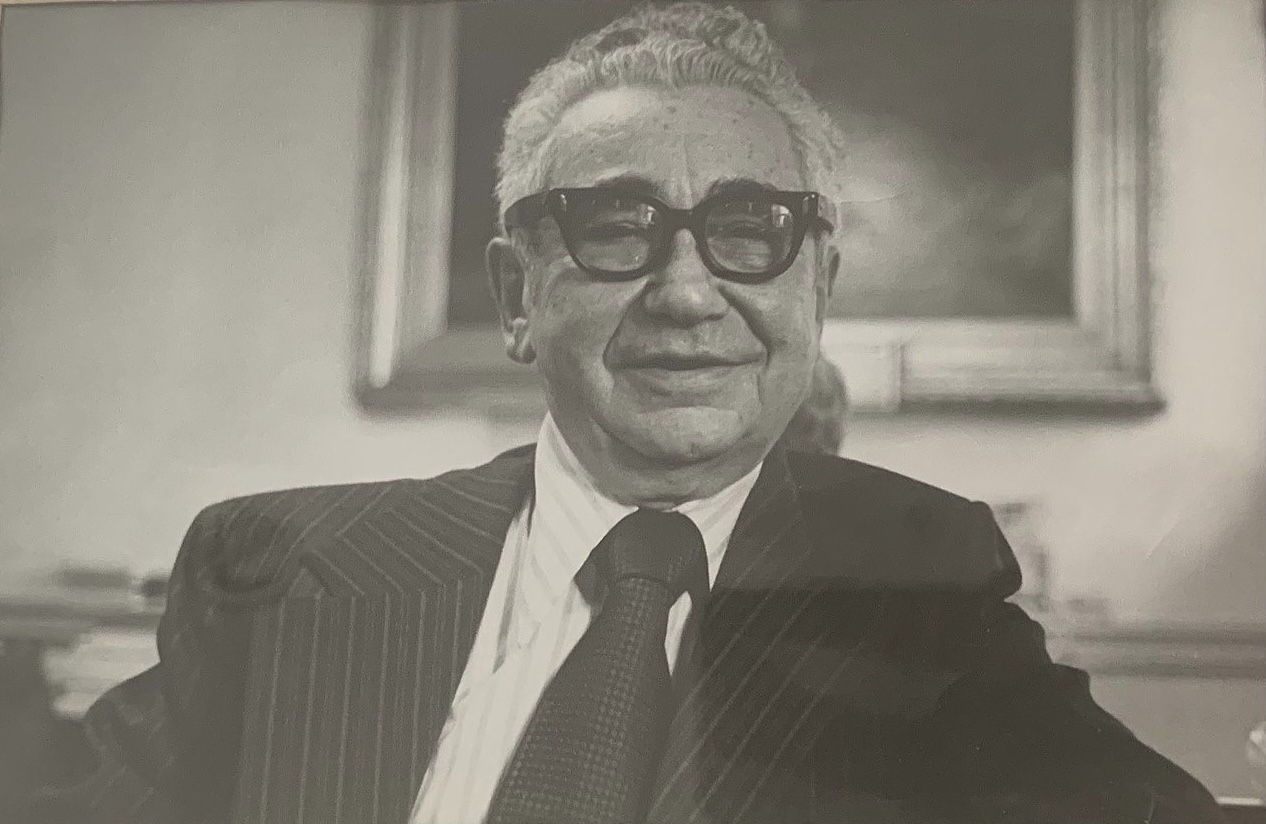
David B. Friedland (1903-1976), American attorney and New York City Councilman

David B. Friedland (1903 - April 24, 1976) was an American lawyer and Democratic Party politician.

== Political career ==
Friedland's first political campaign was for the New York Assembly, where he lost the primary to Mark T. Southall in 1962. Friedland first ran for and won election to the New York City Council in 1965, winning with only a plurality of the votes. He was subsequently re-elected in 1969 by a plurality of the votes and again in 1973 with an overwhelming 77.55% majority of the votes. Friedland represented the 6th district, which was then primarily composed of Washington Heights and Inwood in Manhattan, and extended to the Bronx border.

Friedland enjoyed wide support from leaders of the African American community, including the future Manhattan Borough President Percy Sutton and John Raymond Jones, who were instrumental in helping Friedland to win the election of 1965.

Friedland served as a member of the New York City Council for a decade, where he served as the Consumer Affairs Committee Chairman from 1970 until his death in 1976. He was known to cross Party lines when needed to best serve his constituents. When Republican Mayor John Vliet Lindsay was running into Democratic opposition to his “Little City Halls” scattered throughout the city, Councilman Friedland made news by agreeing to take office space in the “Little City Hall” in Washington Heights. Friedland explained that it would make it easier for him to coordinate his activities on behalf of his constituents with those of the Mayor's staff.

Among measures the Consumer Affairs Committee put forward under Friedland's leadership were those calling for unit pricing of grocery items, seeking to crack down on “massage” parlors, requiring the licensing of television and audio‐equipment repair dealers, creating the New York City Taxi Commission and permitting taxicabs in New York City to carry exterior advertising.

Friedland, also a member of the Council's General Welfare Committee, was also a supporter of gay rights, having voted in committee to send a bill banning discrimination against gay people in housing, employment and public accommodations to the full Council.

After Friedland died, the one year remaining in his term was filled by Arlene Stringer, then wife of Ronald Stringer, counsel to Mayor Abraham Beame and mother of Scott Stringer, who was elected in 1992 to the State Assembly, and in 2005 as Manhattan Borough President.

== Personal life, education and legal career ==
Friedland was born in Russia. Friedland attended DeWitt Clinton High School, City College of New York, and New York University School of Law, where he won the Butler Law Scholarship, and received his law degree in 1925. Friedland had practiced law in New York for 50 years, and was a member of the Board of Governors of the Trial Lawyers Association. He was highly respected for his exceptional legal skills and dedication to his community. Friedland was survived by his wife, the former Sophie Wiener; a son, Gerald (Elaine) Friedland; and three grandchildren.

== Legacy ==
David B. Friedland Square, in Washington Heights, Manhattan, was named for Friedland a few years after his death.
