= Helen Rosenthal =

Former American politician

Helen K. Rosenthal
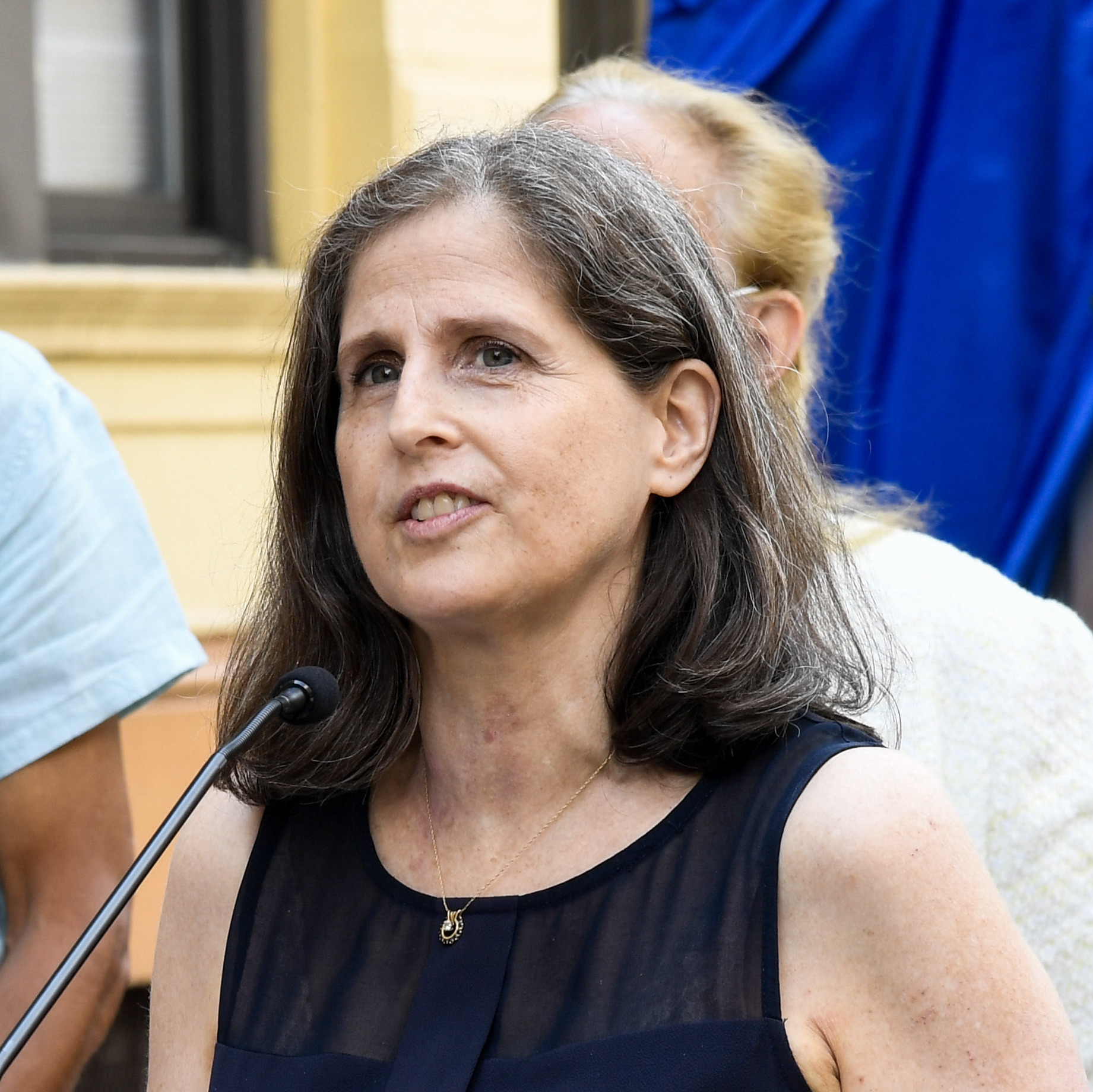

Member of the New York City Council from the 6th district
- In office January 1, 2014 – January 1, 2022
- Preceded by: Gale Brewer
- Succeeded by: Gale Brewer

Personal details
- Born: Helen K. Rosenthal; October 24, 1960 (age 66) Detroit, Michigan, U.S.
- Party: Democratic
- Education: Michigan State University (BA); Yale University (MPH)
- Website: Official website

Helen K. Rosenthal (born October 24, 1960) is a former American politician who served as a member of the New York City Council for the 6th district from 2014 through 2021. The district included the Upper West Side of Manhattan.

== Early life and education ==
Rosenthal was born in Detroit, Michigan, and received a B.A. in socio-economic policy and political theory from Michigan State University in 1982. She earned a Masters in Public Health with distinction from Yale University in 1987. She is Jewish.

== Career ==
From 1988 to 1995, Rosenthal served as an Assistant Director of the New York City Mayor's Office of Management and Budget, where she managed the city's healthcare budgets under Mayors Ed Koch, David Dinkins, and Rudy Giuliani. She worked with a team to bring the Primary Care Development Corporation to fruition by leveraging city bonds for primary care capital financing.

Rosenthal was a longtime member of Community Board 7, having served as Strategy and Budget Committee Chair, Vice Chair, and eventually Board Chair from 2007 to 2009. During this time, she advocated for additional public school seats on the Upper West Side, using data collection to dispute the city's assertion that the district had 1,500 empty school seats. This resulted in the creation of P.S. 452 in 2010.

=== New York City Council ===
In March 2012, Rosenthal announced her candidacy for District 6 of the New York City Council, whose incumbent, Gale Brewer, was term-limited out of office. Rosenthal focused her campaign on issues including public school education, affordable housing, budget expertise, and mass transit improvements. Her bid was endorsed by organizations including the Sierra Club, the National Organization for Women-NYC, and TenantsPAC, a group which advocates for rent-regulated tenants. Other supporters included Gloria Steinem, Michael Moore, former City Councilwoman Ronnie Eldridge, State Senator Liz Krueger, and State Assemblywoman Deborah Glick.

In September 2013, Rosenthal won the Democratic nomination for the District 6 City Council seat, defeating six other candidates. She went on to win the November general election with 78% of the vote, which was the highest of any candidate running for City Council throughout New York City.

While her initial focus was on constituent services and fiscal responsibility, pedestrian safety emerged as a key issue for Rosenthal when three pedestrians were struck and killed on the Upper West Side over a ten-day period in January 2014. She passed Coopers Law in response to his death crossing West End Avenue with the right of way; and advocated for better transportation services meeting the needs of all New Yorkers. Drawing on her budget expertise, she became a leading voice for MTA fiscal accountability.

As Chair of the Committee on Contracts she and then Public Advocate Leticia James were alerted to a NYC DOE $1.1 billion computer contract which had been approved by the Panel for Education Policy. Their call for an Oversight Hearing resulted in cancellation of the contract and a rebid. The final cost of the contract was $472 million saving more than half a billion dollars on that contract alone.

In 2017, Rosenthal was re-elected for a second term with 87% of the vote—again with the highest total of any candidate running for City Council throughout NYC—after securing the Democratic nomination again in the primary with two opponents. Rosenthal's support of a controversial school desegregation plan in her district was cited in endorsements received from The New York Times, the New York Daily News, and the Amsterdam News.

Rosenthal was ranked top lawmaker on New York City Council in City and State 2019.

At the end of her term in 2021, and with advocacy from PowHer and Legal Momentum, Rosenthal sponsored and passed 2022/32 which requires salary range transparency for all NYC jobs. PowHer's post NYC Salary Transparency Law Hailed as Transformative Step Toward Wage Equity, included a quote from Rosenthal, “Our new law shines a light on pay inequity…. Its goal is to level the playing field and restore dignity to those seeking employment…. A brighter light would include full compensation – in addition to salary – and a look-back window for employees to see the salary range for all employees with the same title.” According to the New York City Council 2025 Report, New York City Strives for Pay Equity: The Salary Transparency Law, salary transparency rose by 138% within a year of enactment.

Political offices
Preceded by Gale Brewer	New York City Council, 6th district 2014–present	Incumbent
