= 2013 New York City borough president elections =

- November 5, 2013
	Majority party	Minority party	Third party
Party	Democratic	Republican	Conservative
Seats before	4	0	1
Seats won	4	1	0
Seat change	Steady	▲1	▼1
Popular vote	796,915	144,610	26,567
Percentage	81.34% (Note: Totals may be combined with that of other parties who cross-endorsed Democratic Party candidates via electoral fusion.)	14.76%	2.71%
- Results: Republican gain Democratic hold

The 2013 elections for borough presidents were held on November 5, 2013, and coincided with elections for mayor, public advocate, comptroller, and members of the New York City Council. Primary elections were held on September 10, 2013.

The winning candidates were as follows:

- The Bronx: Rubén Díaz, Jr., incumbent borough president (Democratic)
- Brooklyn: Eric Adams, New York State Senate member (Democratic)
- Manhattan: Gale Brewer, New York City Council member (Democratic)
- Queens: Melinda Katz, former New York City Council member (Democratic)
- Staten Island: James Oddo, New York City Council member (Republican)

== Overview ==
Borough	Democratic		Republican		Others		Total		Result
Borough	Votes	%	Votes	%	Votes	%	Votes	%	Result
The Bronx	119,049	89.35%	10,523	7.90%	3,674	2.76%	133,246	100.0%	Democratic hold
Brooklyn	261,492	90.66%	N/A	N/A	26,936	9.34%	288,428	100.0%	Democratic hold
Manhattan	202,966	82.73%	42,160	17.19%	199	0.08%	245,325	100.0%	Democratic hold
Queens	191,424	80.05%	41,184	17.22%	6,522	2.73%	239,130	100.0%	Democratic hold
Staten Island	21,984	29.85%	50,743	68.91%	914	1.24%	73,641	100.0%	Republican gain
Total	796,915	81.34%	144,610	14.76%	38,245	3.90%	979,770	100.0%	

== The Bronx ==
2013 Bronx presidential election

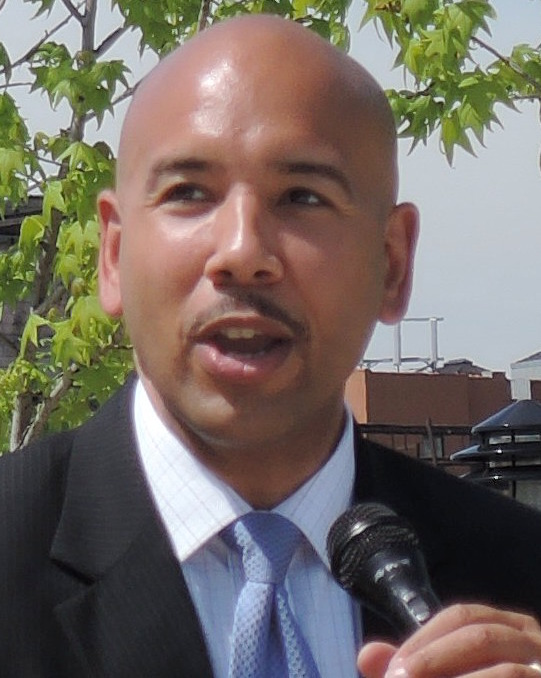

Nominee	Rubén Díaz Jr.	Elizabeth Perri
Party	Democratic	Republican
Alliance	Working Families	Conservative
Popular vote	119,049	10,523
Percentage	89.35%	7.90%
- State assembly results Díaz: 70–80% 80–90% >90%
President before election
Rubén Díaz Jr.
Democratic
Elected President
Rubén Díaz Jr.
Democratic

Incumbent Bronx Borough President Rubén Díaz, Jr. (D) sought reelection. Díaz was first elected Bronx borough president in 2009.

=== Democratic primary ===
==== Candidates ====
- Rubén Díaz, Jr., incumbent borough president
- Mark Escoffery-Bey

==== Results ====
2013 Bronx borough president election Democratic primary results
Party	Candidate	Votes	%
Democratic	Rubén Díaz, Jr. (incumbent)	64,971	84.8
Democratic	Mark Escoffery-Bey	11,727	15.2
Write-in		6	0.0
Total votes		76,704	100

=== Republican primary ===
==== Candidates ====
- Elizabeth Perri

=== Major third parties ===
Besides the Democratic and Republican parties, the Conservative, Green, Independence and Working Families parties are qualified New York parties. These parties have automatic ballot access.

=== Independence ===
==== Candidate ====
Mark Escoffery-Bey

=== Green Party ===
==== Candidates ====
- Carl Lundgren

=== General election results ===
Diaz won the election with 89.3% of the vote. Perri earned 7.9%, Escoffery-Bey garnered 1.6% and Lundgren received 1.1%.

2013 Bronx borough president election
Party	Candidate	Votes	%
Democratic	Rubén Díaz, Jr.	115,745	86.8
Working Families	Rubén Díaz, Jr.	3,304	2.5
Total	Rubén Díaz, Jr. (incumbent)	119,049	89.3
Republican	Elizabeth Perri	8,579	6.4
Conservative	Elizabeth Perri	1,944	1.5
Total	Elizabeth Perri	10,523	7.9
Independence	Mark Escoffery-Bey	1,609	1.2
War Veterans	Mark Escoffery-Bey	566	0.4
Total	Mark Escoffery-Bey	2,175	1.6
Green	Carl Lundgren	1,427	1.1
Write-in		72	0.1
Total votes		133,246	100
Democratic hold			

== Brooklyn ==
2013 Brooklyn presidential election

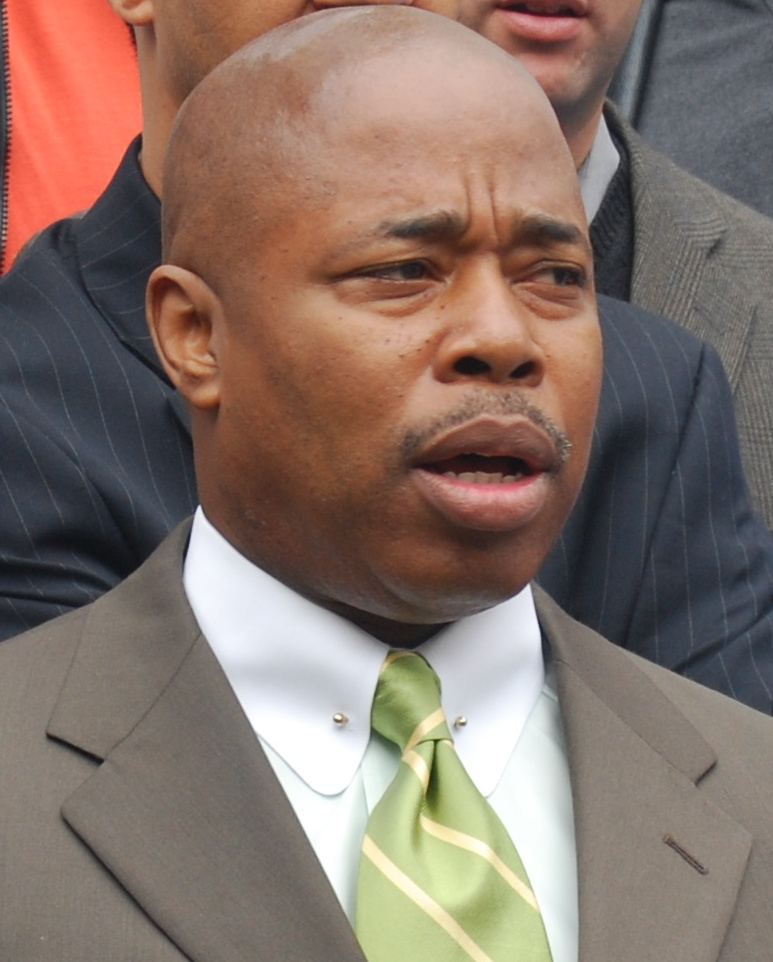

Nominee	Eric Adams	Elias Weir
Party	Democratic	Conservative
Alliance	Working Families
Popular vote	261,492	26,567
Percentage	90.66%	9.21%
- State assembly results Adams: 60–70% 70–80% 80–90% >90%
President before election
Marty Markowitz
Democratic
Elected President
Eric Adams
Democratic

Incumbent Brooklyn Borough President Marty Markowitz (D) could not run again because of term limits. Markowitz served three terms (12 years) as Brooklyn borough president.

=== Democratic primary ===
==== Candidates ====
- Eric Adams, New York state senator

===== Withdrew =====
- Domenic Recchia, New York City councilman
- Carlo Scissura, president of the Brooklyn Chamber of Commerce and former chief of staff to Marty Markowitz

===== Disqualified =====
- John Gangemi, former New York City councilman (petition signatures ruled invalid)

===== Declined =====
- Letitia James, New York City councilwoman (running for public advocate)
- Brad Lander, New York City councilman
- N. Nick Perry, New York City councilman
- Daniel Squadron, state senator (running for public advocate)

=== Major third parties ===
Besides the Democratic and Republican parties, the Conservative, Green, Independence and Working Families parties are qualified New York parties. These parties have automatic ballot access.

=== Conservative ===
- Elias J. Weir

=== General election results ===
Adams won the election with 90.8% of the vote. Weir garnered 9.2%.

2013 Brooklyn borough president election
Party	Candidate	Votes	%
Democratic	Eric Adams	240,158	83.2
Working Families	Eric Adams	21,334	7.4
Total	Eric Adams	261,492	90.6
Conservative	Elias Weir	26,567	9.2
Write-in		369	0.2
Total votes		288,428	100
Democratic hold			

== Manhattan ==
2013 Manhattan presidential election

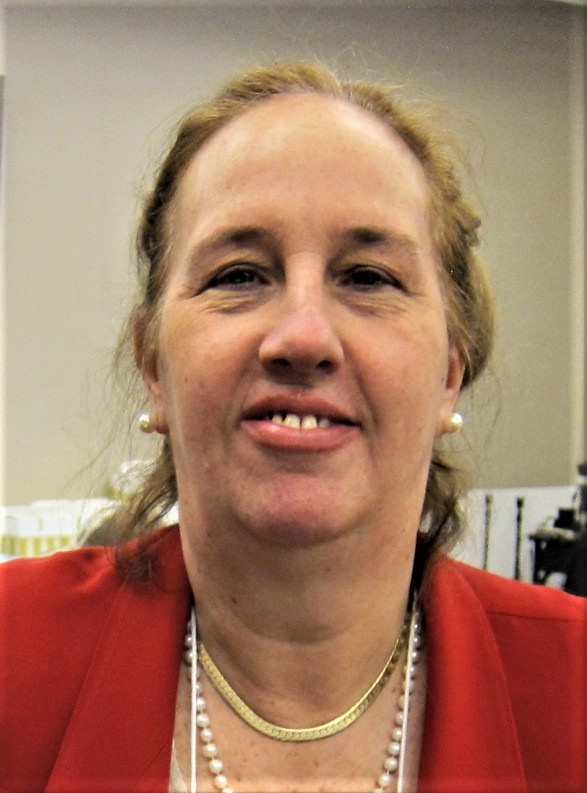

Nominee	Gale Brewer	David Casavis
Party	Democratic	Republican
Alliance		Independence; Libertarian; Dump the Dump
Popular vote	202,966	42,160
Percentage	82.73%	17.19%
- State assembly results Brewer: 60–70% 80–90% >90%
President before election
Scott Stringer
Democratic
Elected President
Gale Brewer
Democratic

Incumbent Manhattan Borough President Scott Stringer (D) did not seek reelection, and instead successfully ran for New York City comptroller in the 2013 election.

=== Democratic primary ===
==== Candidates ====
- Gale Brewer, New York City councilwoman
- Robert Jackson, New York City councilman
- Jessica Lappin, New York City councilwoman
- Julie Menin, former chair of the Manhattan Community Board 1 in Lower Manhattan

==== Polling ====
Poll source	Date(s) administered	Sample size	Margin of error	Gale Brewer	Robert Jackson	Jessica Lappin	Julie Menin	Other	Undecided
Fairbank, Maslin Maullin, Metz & Associates*	April 24–28, 2013	512	± 4.3%	20%	15%	12%	4%	—	48%

* Internal poll for Gale Brewer campaign

==== Results ====
2013 Manhattan borough president election Democratic primary results
Party	Candidate	Votes	%
Democratic	Gale Brewer	62,738	39.7
Democratic	Jessica Lappin	37,292	23.6
Democratic	Robert Jackson	30,873	19.6
Democratic	Julie Menin	26,992	17.1
Write-in		14	0.0
Total votes		157,909	100

=== Republican primary ===
==== Candidates ====
- David Casavis

=== Minor third party ===
Any candidate not among the qualified New York parties must petition their way onto the ballot; they do not face primary elections.

=== Libertarian Party ===
==== Candidates ====
- David Casavis

=== General election ===
Brewer won the election with 82.9% of the vote. Casavis garnered 17.1%.

2013 Manhattan borough president election
Party	Candidate	Votes	%
Democratic	Gale Brewer	202,966	82.7
Republican	David Casavis	37,421	15.3
Independence	David Casavis	2,371	0.9
Libertarian	David Casavis	1,392	0.6
Dump the Dump	David Casavis	976	0.4
Total	David Casavis	42,160	17.2
Write-in		199	0.1
Total votes		245,325	100
Democratic hold			

== Queens ==
2013 Queens presidential election

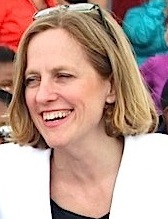

Nominee	Melinda Katz	Aurelio Arcabascio
Party	Democratic	Republican
Alliance	Working Families
Popular vote	191,424	41,184
Percentage	80.05%	17.22%
- State assembly results Katz: 60–70% 70–80% 80–90% >90%
President before election
Helen Marshall
Democratic
Elected President
Melinda Katz
Democratic

Incumbent Queens Borough President Helen Marshall (D) could not run again due to term limits. Marshall served three terms (12 years) as Queens borough president.

=== Democratic primary ===
==== Candidates ====
- Tony Avella, state senator
- Everly Brown
- Melinda Katz, former New York City councilwoman
- Peter Vallone, Jr., New York City councilman

===== Withdrew =====
- Leroy Comrie, New York City councilman
- Jose Peralta, state senator

==== Results ====
2013 Queens borough president election Democratic primary results
Party	Candidate	Votes	%
Democratic	Melinda Katz	52,459	44.8
Democratic	Peter Vallone	39,406	33.6
Democratic	Everly Brown	14,328	12.2
Democratic	Tony Avella	10,858	9.2
Write-in		18	0.2
Total votes		117,069	100

=== Republican primary ===
==== Candidates ====
- Aurelio Arcabascio

=== Minor third party ===
Any candidate not among the six qualified New York parties must petition their way onto the ballot; they do not face primary elections.

=== Other ===
Everly Brown

=== General election results ===
Katz won the election with 80.3% of the vote. Arcabascio garnered 17.1% and Brown earned 2.6%.

2013 Queens borough president election
Party	Candidate	Votes	%
Democratic	Melinda Katz	181,438	75.9
Working Families	Melinda Katz	9,986	4.2
Total	Melinda Katz	191,424	80.1
Republican	Aurelio Arcabascio	41,184	17.2
Jobs & Education	Everly Brown	6,162	2.6
Write-in		360	0.1
Total votes		239,130	100
Democratic hold			

== Staten Island ==
2013 Staten Island presidential election
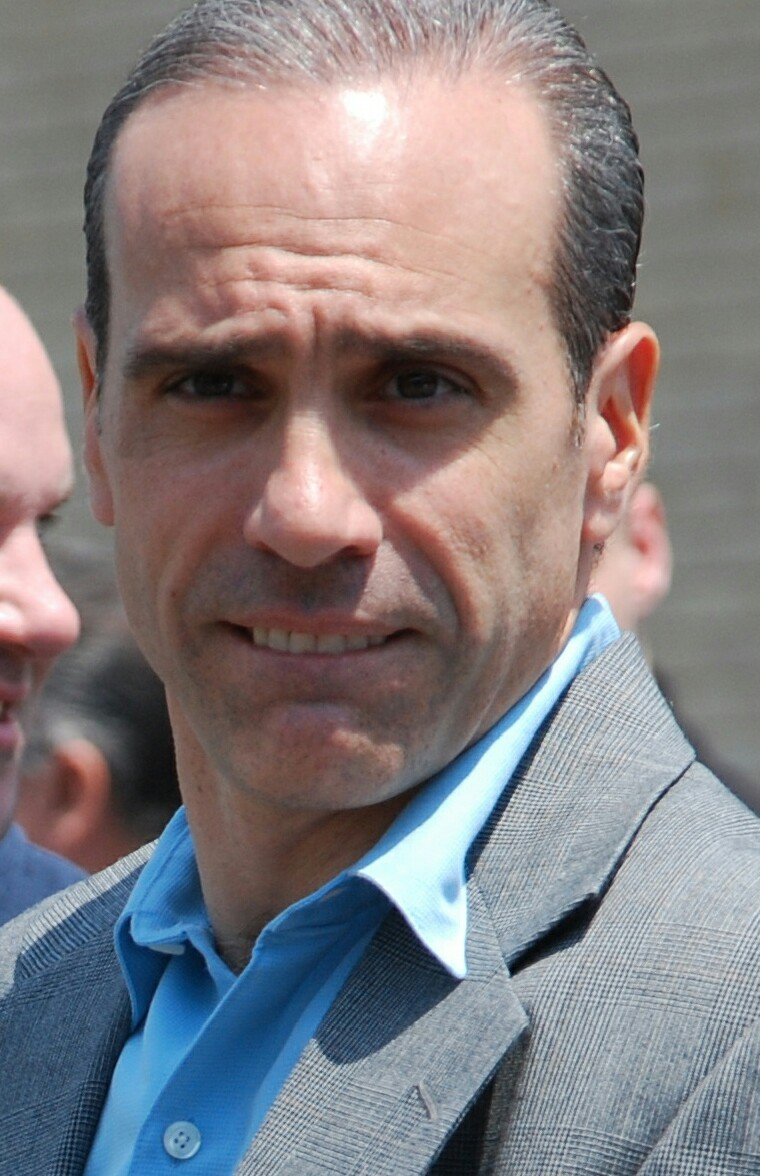

Nominee	James Oddo	Louis Liedy
Party	Republican	Democratic
Alliance	Conservative; Independence	Working Families
Popular vote	50,743	21,984
Percentage	68.91%	29.85%
- State assembly results Oddo: 60–70% 70–80% 80–90% Liedy: 50–60%
President before election
James Molinaro
Conservative
Elected President
James Oddo
Republican

Incumbent Staten Island Borough President James Molinaro (C) could not run again because of term limits. Molinaro served three terms (12 years) as Staten Island borough president.

=== Republican primary ===
==== Candidates ====
- James Oddo, New York City councilman

=== Democratic primary ===
==== Candidates ====
- Louis Liedy

===== Disqualified =====
- Richard Luthman (did not collect enough petition signatures)

=== Major third parties ===
Besides the Democratic and Republican parties, the Conservative, Green, Independence and Working Families parties are qualified New York parties. These parties have automatic ballot access.

=== Green Party ===
==== Candidates ====
- Henry Bardel

=== Minor third parties ===
Any candidate not among the qualified New York parties must petition their way onto the ballot; they do not face primary elections.

=== Libertarian Party ===
==== Candidates ====
- Silas Johnson

=== General election results ===
Oddo won the election with 69.1% of the vote. Liedy garnered 29.7%, Bardel earned .7% and Johnson received .5% of the vote.

2013 Staten Island borough president election
Party	Candidate	Votes	%
Republican	James Oddo	42,305	57.4
Conservative	James Oddo	6,478	8.8
Independence	James Oddo	1,960	2.7
Total	James Oddo	50,743	68.9
Democratic	Louis Liedy	20,609	28.0
Working Families	Louis Liedy	1,375	1.9
Total	Louis Liedy	21,984	29.9
Green	Henry Bardel	495	0.6
Libertarian	Silas Johnson	326	0.4
Write-in		93	0.2
Total votes		73,641	100
Republican gain from Conservative			

== See also ==
- Borough president
- Government of New York City
