= Fort Washington Ave Rehab =

Fort Washington Consolidation
- NYCHA Property
- Fort Washington Avenue Rehab Consolidation
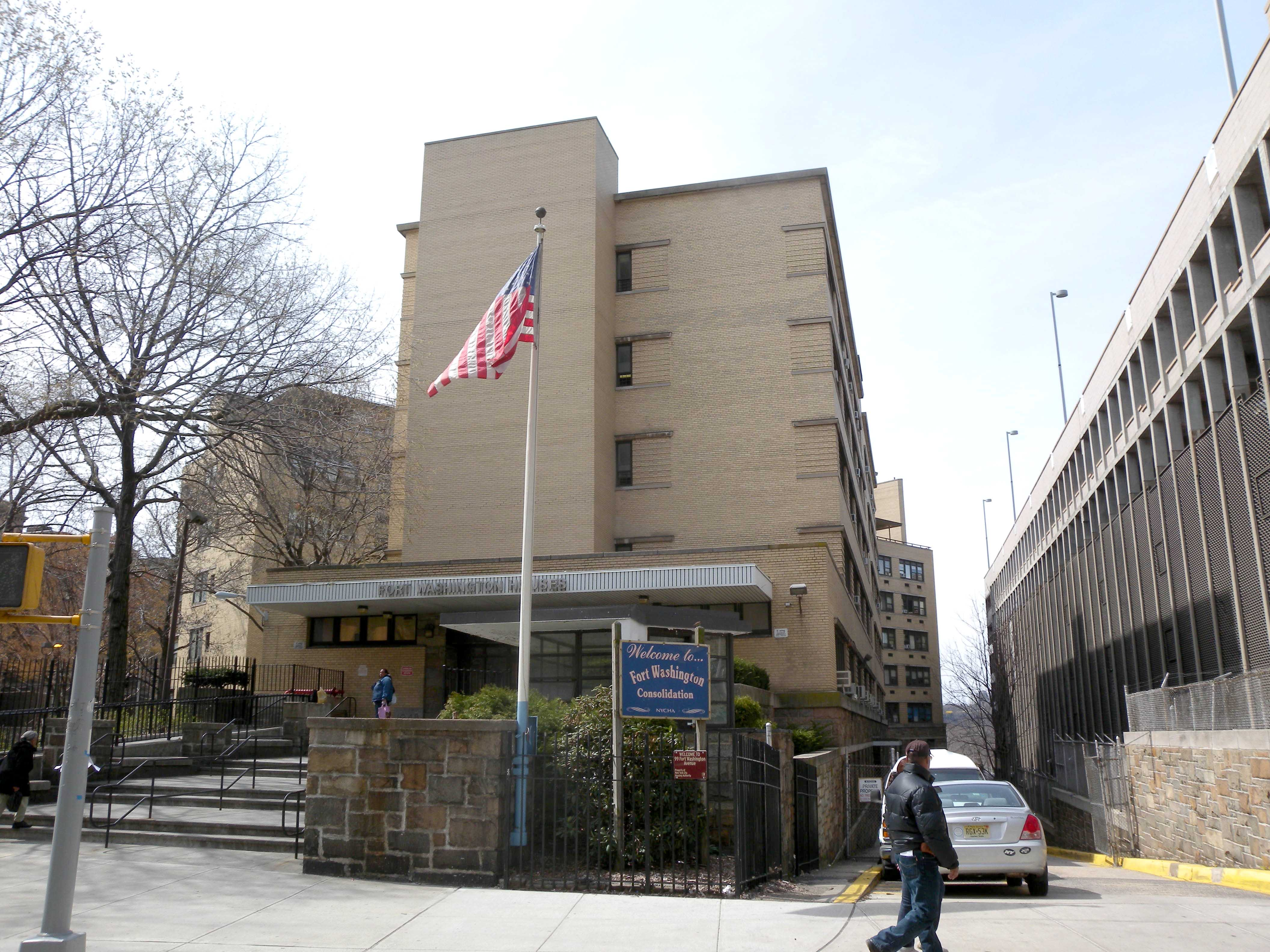
- Interactive map of Fort Washington Consolidation
- Country: United States
- State: New York
- City: New York City
- Borough: Manhattan

Area
  - Total: 2.61 acres (1.06 ha)

Population
  - Total: 275
- Zip Code: 10032

The Fort Washington Avenue Rehab, also known as the Fort Washington Houses, is a seven-story senior housing and center building owned by the New York City Housing Authority (NYCHA). It is located on the north side of West 163rd Street between Riverside Drive and Fort Washington Avenue in the Washington Heights neighborhood of Manhattan in New York City.

== History ==
In October 1979, an announcement was made that the former Delafield Hospital was being transferred to NYCHA for conversion to public housing for the elderly; the building had been vacant following the hospital's closure in 1975. The hospital had been designed by Isadore Rosenfield and its construction was funded through the Public Works Administration. Efforts to save the structure from demolition were led by a coalition of groups including the Columbia-Presbyterian Medical Center, Fort Washington Houses Services for the Elderly, New York City Department for the Aging and City Councilmember Stanley Michels.

A groundbreaking ceremony for the conversion of the building into the Fort Washington Houses was held on July 1, 1983 and attended by Mayor Ed Koch. The renovated building opened in May 1985. That same year, Fort Washington Houses Services for the Elderly opened a senior citizen center on the ground floor and basement of the housing complex. Occupying an area of 25,000 square feet (2,300 m^{2}), the senior citizen center grew to provide bilingual programs in English and Spanish to 900 members, most of which lived in the surrounding neighborhood. Columbia-Presbyterian Medical Center opened an ambulatory care center specializing in geriatrics within the building in 1987.

=== 21st Century ===
In 2010, the senior citizen center was expanded to include the Riverstone Memory Center in a 6,200-square-foot (580 m^{2}) space designed for persons suffering from memory loss. (Note: Fort Washington Houses Services for the Elderly changed its name to Riverstone Senior Life Services in 2008.)

The Permanent Affordability Commitment Together (PACT) conversion on this building started in November 2020. The Property Manager is Cornell Place Inc. and the Social Security Provider is The Community League of Heights, Inc. A total of 16 housing complexes in Manhattan, including this building at 99 Fort Washington Avenue, were renovated under the PACT program beginning in January 2021.

== See also ==
- New York City Housing Authority
