= Arlene Stringer-Cuevas =

American politician (1933–2020)

Member of the New York City Council from the 6th district
- In office 1976–1977
- Preceded by: David B. Friedland
- Succeeded by: Stanley Michels

Personal details
- Born: Arlene Gluss; September 25, 1933 The Bronx, U.S.
- Died: April 3, 2020 (aged 86) The Bronx, New York City, U.S.
- Party: Democratic Party
- Spouse(s): Ronald Stringer; Carlos Cuevas
- Children: 2, including Scott Stringer
- Relatives: Bella Abzug (cousin)

Arlene Stringer-Cuevas (née Gluss; September 25, 1933 – April 3, 2020) was an American politician, educator, and civil servant. She was a schoolteacher before serving on the New York City Council from 1976 to 1977. Stringer-Cuevas later worked for the New York City Human Resources Administration for 16 years until her retirement in 1994. She died during the COVID-19 pandemic due to complications of COVID-19.

== Early life ==
Stringer-Cuevas was born Arlene Gluss in the Bronx, and was a school teacher. She lived in the Washington Heights, Manhattan. She was Jewish.

== Career ==
Stringer-Cuevas served as her neighborhood's Democratic Party district leader from 1969 to 1976. She was elected to the New York City Council in 1976 after winning a four-person primary for the Democratic nomination, becoming the first woman to represent Washington Heights. Stringer-Cuevas was defeated in the Democratic primary in 1977.

Stringer-Cuevas then worked for the New York City Human Resources Administration from 1978 until her retirement in 1994.

== Personal life ==
Stringer-Cuevas was part of a politically active family. Her first husband, Ronald Stringer, was an assistant to New York City Mayor Abraham Beame. Her second husband, Carlos Cuevas, was the New York City Clerk and a Deputy Borough President of the Bronx. Stringer-Cuevas' son Scott Stringer was elected Borough President of Manhattan and New York City Comptroller. She was the cousin of politician women's rights pioneer Bella Abzug.

On April 3, 2020, at the age of 86, Stringer-Cuevas died from complications due to COVID-19 at Montefiore Medical Center in the Bronx.
