= Mel Wymore =

American politician

Mel Joaquin Wymore
- Education: University of Arizona
- Occupation: Social Entrepreneur

Mel Joaquin Wymore is an American activist, systems engineer, and social impact entrepreneur.

== Education ==
Wymore was formally trained in mathematics, communications, and systems engineering at the University of Arizona, and certified in sustainable business strategy at Harvard.

== Career ==
Over 30 years, Wymore served in local and nonprofit governance, organizing dozens of large-scale projects to expand public resources and support vulnerable residents of Manhattan's Upper West Side. As executive director of TransPAC, he marshaled support to pass first-ever gender protections in NY State (GENDA) in 2019.

In 2009, a single mother of two children, Chair of Manhattan Community Board 7, and Chair of Ethical Culture Fieldston parents association, Wymore began a gender transition in open dialogue with thousands of parents and neighbors. In 2013, Wymore ran for New York City Council and became the first openly transgender person to run for public office in the State of New York. Although Wymore received widespread support and the endorsement of the New York Times, he placed 2th in a field of seven candidates.
