= 2013 New York City Comptroller election =

2013 New York City comptroller election
- November 5, 2013
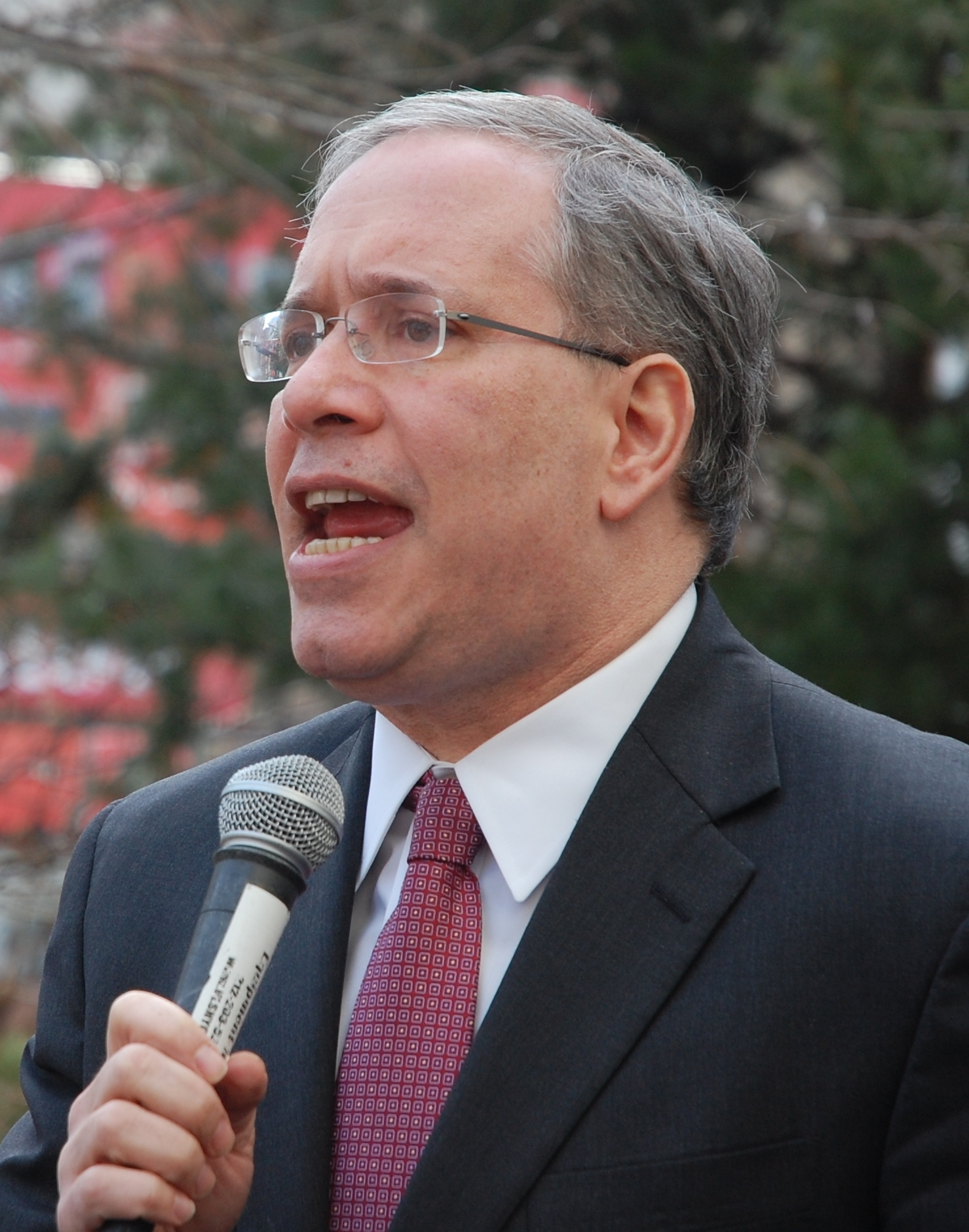

Candidate	Scott Stringer	John Burnett
Party	Democratic	Republican
Alliance	Working Families	Conservative; School Choice
Popular vote	827,562	171,635
Percentage	80.4%	16.7%
- Stringer: 50–60% 60–70% 70–80% 80–90% >90% Burnett: 50–60%
Comptroller before election
John Liu
Democratic
Elected Comptroller
Scott Stringer
Democratic

The 2013 election for New York City comptroller was held on November 5, 2013, along with elections for mayor, public advocate, borough presidents, and members of the New York City Council.

The first-term incumbent comptroller, John Liu, did not run for re-election, as he decided to run in the 2013 election for mayor of New York City. The Democratic Party nomination was won by Scott Stringer, who defeated former Governor Eliot Spitzer, who resigned in disgrace in 2008. John Burnett was the Republican nominee.

On Election Day, Stringer handily defeated Burnett and various third-party candidates, winning 80.4% of the vote.

== Democratic primary ==
New York City Borough President Scott Stringer was considered the front runner for the Democratic nomination, having raised nearly $3.5 million as of July 7, 2013. When former New York Governor Eliot Spitzer announced his intention to run for the office, he brought a larger challenge to Stringer. In 2008, while governor, Spitzer resigned amid a prostitution scandal. His name recognition as a former governor was expected to help him in the election, while the scandal was expected to harm his chances. "I'm hopeful there will be forgiveness, I am asking for it," Spitzer said, commenting on the scandal. "Politics is a contact sport," Spitzer said on July 8, on radio's The Bill Press Show. "I made significant errors. I stood up, accepted responsibility, resigned. It's now been five years, I hope the public will extend its forgiveness to me."

Coincidentally, Spitzer was running against Kristin M. Davis (who was running as a Libertarian), his former madam who had helped him get call girls as governor. She spent three months in prison for running an escort service. "This is going to be the funnest campaign ever," she told The New York Daily News. "I’ve been waiting for my day to face [Spitzer] for five years," Davis said. "I sat ... in Rikers Island, I came out penniless and nothing happened to him. The hypocrisy there is huge."

Stringer's campaign immediately responded to Spitzer's candidacy. On July 8, his campaign manager released a statement saying, "Scott Stringer has a proven record of results and integrity and entered this race to help New York's middle class regain its footing. By contrast, Eliot Spitzer is going to spurn the campaign finance program to try to buy personal redemption with his family fortune. The voters will decide." The statement alluded to Spitzer's family fortune. Prior to Spitzer's announcement, Stringer had already received several endorsements from candidates in the mayoral election, most of whom did not withdraw their endorsements after Spitzer's announcement. One of the first to publicly state her support of Stringer was Christine Quinn, the speaker of the New York City Council. She stated, "Scott Stringer has been an exceptional borough president with the highest ethical standards. He has my full support and I will do whatever I can to help him become the next comptroller of the City of New York."

Spitzer appeared on CNBC's Morning Joe on July 9, and was visibly emotional when asked about what he had learned in the past five years.

Stringer's fundraising soared dramatically after Spitzer's announcement. During the week of July 8, Stringer raised over $100,000. In all, Stringer had spent just over $679,000 and had $3 million on hand. Spitzer declared that he could use his family fortune to finance his campaign. Although he hired staffers to collect petitions, Spitzer's campaign did not list any major spending during the then most recent filing period.

On July 11, a deadline passed for candidates to file an ethics report. Several of the candidates, most notably Spitzer, did not file the report in time. Not filing a report can lead to a fine of between $250 and $10,000. However, there was a 1-week grace period before any penalties were enforced. A lawyer representing Spitzer's campaign said the candidate was "very busy" last week working on filing petitions with the signatures he needed to secure a spot on the Democratic ballot. A spokesperson for Stringer's campaign stated, "The old Eliot Spitzer supported stringent ethics disclosure. Just as we've seen on his decision to abandon campaign spending limits he once supported, it's increasingly clear that Eliot Spitzer believes there are two standards in public life—one for him, and one for everyone else." Even with that news, Spitzer was still leading in polls conducted.

In an ad that began airing during the week of July 22, 2013, Spitzer admitted that he "failed-big time." He went on to say, "I hurt a lot of people. When you dig yourself a hole, you can either lie in it the rest of your life, or do something positive. That's why I'm running... Everyone, no matter who you are, deserves a fair shot. I'm asking voters to give the same for me."

News coverage about the election (and, more specifically, Spitzer's attempt at redemption) were mixed. On July 18 CNN host Jake Tapper talked about Spitzer's "incredibly reckless and ... very illegal" prostitution scandal. In an interview on The Colbert Report, comedian Stephen Colbert noted Spitzer's lead in the polls by asking, "Do you [Spitzer] think that signals progress for our country or the slow decay of our moral values?" After Spitzer began laughing, Colbert declared, "This isn't Charlie Rose motherf**ker!" Speaking about Spitzer's own qualifications Colbert asked if Spitzer was "at once and the same time above and below this job?" He later asked, "Shouldn't the job of comptroller go to someone who has shown a modicum of self-comptrol? Why should the people trust you?" "The totality of a record," Spitzer suggested, such as his time as attorney general, make him a suitable candidate. In 2010, after the initial scandal, Colbert told him he could be honest with him because Spitzer had "no public image to uphold." However, Politico blogger Gary Bauer suggested that, unlike Anthony Weiner (who was running for mayor), Spitzer seemed to be redeeming himself. Similarly, the Los Angeles Times noted that, while Spitzer's past had hurt him, voters were beginning to forgive him, noting that, unlike Weiner, Spitzer stopped his behavior immediately after leaving office.

Stringer defeated Spitzer in the primary election, 52.1% to 47.9%.

=== Candidates ===
==== Declared ====
- Eliot Spitzer, former governor of New York
- Scott Stringer, Manhattan borough president

==== Withdrew ====
- Daniel Garodnick, New York City councilman

==== Declined ====
- John Liu, incumbent comptroller (running for mayor)
- Domenic Recchia, New York City councilman (running for Congress)
- Anthony Weiner, former U.S. representative (running for mayor)
- David Yassky, chairman of the New York City Taxi and Limousine Commission and candidate for comptroller in 2009

=== Polling ===
Poll source	Date(s) administered	Sample size	Margin of error	Eliot Spitzer	Scott Stringer	Other	Undecided
PPP	September 7–8, 2013	683	± 3.8%	45%	41%	—	14%
Quinnipiac	September 6–8, 2013	782	± 3.5%	43%	50%	1%	7%
Marist	September 3–6, 2013	556	± 4.2%	47%	45%	<1%	7%
Quinnipiac	August 28–September 1, 2013	750	± 3.6%	45%	47%	—	7%
Siena	August 19–28, 2013	505	± 4%	50%	35%	—	15%
amNewYork/News 12	August 22–27, 2013	600	± 4%	46%	43%	—	10%
Quinnipiac	August 22–27, 2013	602	± 4%	46%	46%	—	8%
Marist	August 12–14, 2013	355	± 5.2%	53%	34%	1%	11%
Quinnipiac	August 7–12, 2013	579	± 4.1%	56%	37%	—	7%
Siena	August 2–7, 2013	505	± 4%	44%	35%	2%	19%
Marist	July 24, 2013	551	± 4.2%	49%	32%	2%	17%
Quinnipiac	July 18–23, 2013	507	± 4.4%	49%	45%	—	6%
Quinnipiac	July 8–14, 2013	738	± 3.6%	48%	33%	1%	19%
Marist	July 8–9, 2013	546	± 4.2%	42%	33%	1%	24%

=== Debates ===
2013 New York City comptroller election Democratic primary debates
No.	Date	Host	Moderator	Link	Democratic	Democratic
Key: P Participant A Absent N Not invited I Invited W Withdrawn						
Key: P Participant A Absent N Not invited I Invited W Withdrawn					Eliot Spitzer	Scott Stringer
1	Aug. 12, 2013	Citizens Committee of New York City; Citizens Union; Gothamist; Hispanic Federation; New York One; New York One Noticias; New York Daily News; New York City Campaign Finance Board; Transportation Alternatives; WNYC-FM	Brian Lehrer; Errol Louis	YouTube	P	P
2	Aug. 22, 2013	Common Cause New York; El Diario La Prensa; New York City Campaign Finance Board; WCBS 880; WCBS-TV; WINS (AM); WLNY-TV	Marcia Kramer	YouTube	P	P

=== Results ===
Results by state assembly district Stringer: 50%–60%; 60%–70%; 70%–80%; Spitzer: 50%–60%; 60%–70%

2013 New York City comptroller election Democratic primary results
Party	Candidate	Votes	%
Democratic	Scott Stringer	314,285	52.11
Democratic	Eliot Spitzer	288,739	47.88
Democratic	Write-in	82	0.01
Total votes		603,106	100.00

== Republican primary ==
John Burnett, a Wall Street financier, ran unopposed for the nomination of the Republican Party. In mid-July 2013, he announced he would release his personal tax returns. New York Republican consultant William F. B. O'Reilly opined that Burnett would have a reasonably strong chance of success in the election if Spitzer won the Democratic primary.

=== Candidates ===
==== Nominee ====
- John Burnett, financier

== Major third parties ==
Besides the Democratic and Republican parties, the Conservative, Green, Independence and Working Families parties are qualified New York parties. These parties have automatic ballot access.

=== Conservative ===
==== Nominee ====
- John Burnett, financier

=== Green ===
==== Nominee ====
- Julia Willebrand, activist, candidate for mayor in 2001 and candidate for New York state comptroller in 2006

=== Working Families ===
==== Nominee ====
- Scott Stringer, Manhattan borough president

== Minor third parties ==
Any candidate not among the six qualified New York parties (Democratic, Republican, Conservative, Green, Independence and Working Families) must petition their way onto the ballot; they do not face primary elections.

=== Libertarian ===
==== Nominee ====
- Hesham El-Meligy, activist

==== Withdrew ====
- Kristin M. Davis, former madam with ties to Eliot Spitzer's prostitution scandal, and Anti-Prohibition Party nominee for governor in 2010

=== Socialist Worker ===
==== Nominee ====
- John W. Studer

=== School Choice ===
==== Nominee ====
- John L. Burnett

=== War Veterans Party ===
==== Nominee ====
- Richard Bozulich, publisher

== Debate ==
2013 New York City comptroller election debate
No.	Date	Host	Moderator	Link	Democratic	Republican
Key: P Participant A Absent N Not invited I Invited W Withdrawn						
Key: P Participant A Absent N Not invited I Invited W Withdrawn					Scott Stringer	John Burnett
1	Oct. 8, 2013	Citizens Committee of New York City; Citizens Union; Gothamist; Hispanic Federation; New York One; New York One Noticias; New York Daily News; New York City Campaign Finance Board; Transportation Alternatives; WNYC-FM	Brian Lehrer; Errol Louis	YouTube	P	P

== Results ==
On Election Day, Stringer handily defeated Burnett and various third-party candidates, winning 80.4% of the vote. Burnett received 16.7% of the vote.

General election results
Party	Candidate	Votes	%
Democratic	Scott Stringer	776,700	75.48%
Working Families	Scott Stringer	50,862	4.94%
Total	Scott Stringer	827,562	80.43%
Republican	John Burnett	141,854	13.79%
Conservative	John Burnett	28,574	2.78%
School Choice	John Burnett	1,207	0.12%
Total	John Burnett	171,635	16.68%
Green	Julia Willebrand	20,566	2.00%
Libertarian	Hesham El-Meligy	5,349	0.52%
Socialist Workers	John Studer	2,013	0.20%
War Veterans	Richard Bozulich	1,240	0.12%
	Write-ins	614	0.06%
Total votes		1,028,979	100%

== See also ==
- New York City Comptroller
- Government of New York City
- 2013 New York City mayoral election
- 2013 New York City Public Advocate election
