= Ronnie Eldridge =

American politician and television host (1931–2026)

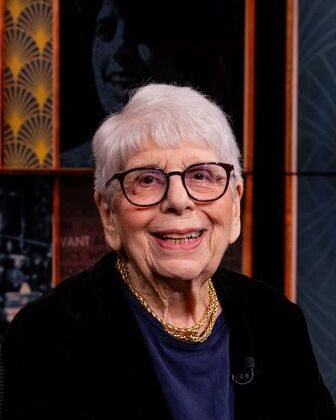
- Eldridge on set of Keeping Relevant (2026)

Member of the New York City Council
- In office January 1, 1989 – December 31, 2001
- Preceded by: Ruth Messinger
- Succeeded by: Gale Brewer
- Constituency: 4th district (1989–1991); 6th district (1991–2001)

Personal details
- Born: Roslynn Myers; January 31, 1931 New York City, U.S.
- Died: March 4, 2026 (aged 95) New York City, U.S.
- Party: Democratic
- Spouses: Lawrence O. Eldridge (m. 1955; died 1970) Jimmy Breslin (m. 1982; died 2017)
- Education: Barnard College (1952)
- Occupation: Activist, businesswoman, politician, television host

Roslynn Eldridge (née Myers; January 30, 1931 – March 4, 2026) was an American activist, businesswoman, politician, and television host. She was the host of Keeping Relevant, a weekly television talk show on CUNY TV, the television station of the City University of New York.

== Early life and career ==
Roslynn Myers was born on January 30, 1931, in Manhattan, the daughter of Clifford and Aimee (née Fleck) Myers. She had an early interest in politics. She graduated from Barnard College with a political science degree.

Eldridge was an executive producer at Channel 13, where she worked on such television series as Woman Alive!. In 1977, she resigned from the network to enter politics and run for Manhattan Borough President. She said, "Does anyone honestly believe that the whole household of Manhattan can be run by men alone?". She lost the race for borough president. She became manager of community and government affairs for the Port Authority of New York and New Jersey. A protégé of Robert F. Kennedy, she went on to serve New York City's Mayor John V. Lindsay as Special Assistant, and was the only female member of the cabinet of New York Governor Mario Cuomo serving as Director of the Division for Women. Equal parts entrepreneurial and political she spearheaded Special Projects for Ms Magazine and served as Executive Director of the MS Foundation for Women. From 1989 to 2001, she represented the Upper West Side on the New York City Council. Thereafter she worked on various political projects as well as several business ventures and activism campaigns focusing on women's rights.

In 2019, Eldridge endorsed Pete Buttigieg in the 2020 Democratic Party presidential primaries.

== Personal life and death ==
Eldridge was married to Jimmy Breslin, a Pulitzer Prize–winning journalist and author. The celebrated marriage between the feminist politician and the gruff city columnist inspired the CBS show, "American Nuclear." She and her husband were the parents of nine children and 12 grandchildren. They remained married until Breslin's death in 2017 left Eldridge widowed for a second time.

Eldridge died at a hospital in Manhattan on March 4, 2026, at the age of 95.

Political offices
Preceded by Ruth Messinger	New York City Council, 4th district 1989–1991	Succeeded by Carolyn Maloney
Preceded by Stanley Michels	New York City Council, 6th district 1991–2001	Succeeded by Gale Brewer
