= New York City Broadband Advisory Committee =

New York City Broadband Advisory Committee (NYBAC) was brought into existence in 2005 by New York City Local Law 126. The law was introduced to the New York City Council by (then) city council member Gale Brewer and signed by (then) Mayor Bloomberg. It was created to get public input and to advise the mayor and the city council on bringing affordable broadband to New York City residents, nonprofit organizations and businesses.

The committee held public hearings in each of the five boroughs of New York City.

In addition, the city's economic development corporation commissioned a report on the city's digital divide.
