= 1997 New York City mayoral election =

- November 4, 1997
- Registered: 3,514,974
- Turnout: 1,409,347; 40.09% (▼17.41 pp)

Nominee	Rudy Giuliani	Ruth Messinger
Party	Republican	Democratic
Alliance	Liberal
Popular vote	783,815	549,335
Percentage	57.7%	40.5%
- Giuliani: 50–60% 60–70% 70–80% 80–90% Messinger: 40–50% 50–60% 60–70% 70–80% 80–90%
Mayor before election
Rudy Giuliani
Republican
Elected Mayor
Rudy Giuliani
Republican

The New York City mayoral election of 1997 occurred on Tuesday, November 4, 1997, with incumbent mayor Rudy Giuliani of the Republican party defeating Manhattan Borough President Ruth Messinger of the Democratic party and several third-party candidates. This was the first time Brooklyn voted for a Republican since 1941 and the first time Manhattan did so since 1965.

== Democratic primary ==
=== Candidates ===
- Ruth Messinger, Manhattan Borough President
- Al Sharpton, Baptist minister, activist, and founder of National Action Network
- Sal Albanese, New York City councilman

==== Withdrew ====
- Fernando Ferrer, Bronx Borough President (1987–2001) (endorsed Messinger)

==== Declined ====
- David Dinkins, former New York City mayor (1990–1993) and Manhattan Borough President (1986–1989)
- Alan Hevesi, New York City Comptroller (1994–2001)
- Carl McCall, New York State Comptroller (1993–2002)
- Mark Green, New York City Public Advocate
- Peter Vallone Sr., New York City Council
- Bill Bratton, former New York City Police Commissioner (1994–96, 2014–16)

=== Campaign ===
The primary campaign was largely uneventful until April, due to former mayor David Dinkins opting out of a potential third rematch against Rudy Giuliani. Messinger, the front-runner, ignored her opponents in favor of attacking Giuliani.

Sharpton, for his part, ran a "street-corner, subway-stop campaign that raised little money, aired no television commercials and hired no consultants." Instead, he relied on his high name recognition among New Yorkers from his organization on behalf of Tawana Brawley, Yusef Hawkins, and the Central Park Five and his prior runs for United States Senate in 1992 and 1994.

=== Debates ===
1997 New York City mayoral election democratic primary debate
No.	Date	Host	Moderator	Link	Democratic	Democratic	Democratic	Democratic
Key: P Participant A Absent N Not invited I Invited W Withdrawn								
Key: P Participant A Absent N Not invited I Invited W Withdrawn					Sal Albanese	Ruth Messinger	Al Sharpton	Eric Ruano-Melendez
1	Aug. 19, 1997	El Diario La Prensa; New York One; New York City Campaign Finance Board; St. Francis College; WNYC-FM	Lewis Dodley	YouTube	P	P	P	P

1997 New York City mayoral election democratic primary run-off debate
No.	Date	Host	Moderator	Link	Democratic	Democratic
Key: P Participant A Absent N Not invited I Invited W Withdrawn						
Key: P Participant A Absent N Not invited I Invited W Withdrawn					Ruth Messinger	Al Sharpton
1	Sep. 15, 1997	New York One; New York City Campaign Finance Board; St. Francis College; WNYC-FM	Roma Torre	YouTube	P	P

=== Results ===
Initial results indicated that Messinger had received 39 percent of the vote, thereby triggering a run-off against Al Sharpton, the runner-up. The run-off was scheduled for September 23. Observers initially blamed Messinger's "bland and often bumbling primary campaign" for the close results.

However, absentee ballots gave Messinger 40.159 percent of the vote, 658 votes more than necessary to win the nomination outright.

Results by State Assembly district Messinger: 30%–40%; 40%–50%; 50%–60%; 60%–70%; Sharpton: 30%–40%; 40%–50%; 50%–60%; 60%–70%; 70%–80%; Albanese: 30%–40%; 40%–50%; 50%–60%; 70%–80%

1997 Democratic mayoral primary
Party	Candidate	Votes	%
Democratic	Ruth Messinger	165,377	40.19
Democratic	Al Sharpton	131,848	32.04
Democratic	Sal Albanese	86,485	21.02

After the Board of Elections cancelled the run-off, Sharpton filed suit, charging "such substantial fraud and irregularities in the conduct of the primary election ... that it is impossible to render a determination as to who was rightfully nominated." Sharpton claimed, among other things, that non-Democrats were allowed to vote, that more votes were counted in some districts than there were voters, that some registered voters were wrongly turned away from polling locations, and that some voting machine were broken.

Though she agreed that the vote-counting process "took too long", Messinger claimed victory on the basis of the Board of Elections decision.

== General election ==
=== Candidates ===
- Rudy Giuliani, incumbent mayor of New York City (Republican, Liberal)
- Ruth Messinger, Manhattan Borough President (Democratic)

In the general election, Giuliani had the Republican and Liberal ballot lines, but not the Conservative line. Giuliani had run on the same two ballot lines in his unsuccessful 1989 mayoral campaign and in his winning campaign in 1993. Conservative Party leaders were unhappy with Giuliani on ideological grounds, citing the Liberal Party's endorsement statement that Giuliani "agreed with the Liberal Party's views on affirmative action, gun control, school prayer and tuition tax credits."

=== Campaign ===
Giuliani's opponent in 1997 was Democratic Manhattan Borough President Ruth Messinger, who had beaten Al Sharpton in the Democratic primary on September 9, 1997. The results of the Democratic primary were contested in court by Sharpton, who argued that he qualified for a run-off election with Messinger. Sharpton waited until October to endorse Messinger against Giuliani, and the endorsement was perceived by some as tepid.

Giuliani ran an aggressive campaign, parlaying his image as a tough leader who had cleaned up the city. Giuliani's popularity was at its highest point to date, with a late October 1997 Quinnipiac University Polling Institute poll showing him as having a 68% approval rating; 70% of New Yorkers were satisfied with life in the city and 64% said things were better in the city compared to four years previously.

Throughout the campaign, Giuliani was well ahead in the polls and had a strong fundraising advantage over Messinger. On her part, Messinger lost the support of several usually Democratic constituencies, including gay organizations and large labor unions. All four daily New York newspapers—The New York Times, New York Daily News, New York Post, and Newsday—endorsed Giuliani over Messinger. Two televised debates were held, but Messinger was unable to get traction in highlighting that Giuliani was interested in higher office and might not serve out a full second term. Messinger claimed that the real mayor was not in evidence during the debates: "Let me point out that we're certainly seeing the nice Rudy Giuliani tonight."

=== Debate ===
1997 New York City mayoral election debate
No.	Date	Host	Moderator	Link	Republican	Democratic	Socialist Workers
Key: P Participant A Absent N Not invited I Invited W Withdrawn							
Key: P Participant A Absent N Not invited I Invited W Withdrawn					Rudy Giuliani	Ruth Messinger	Olga Rodriguez
1	Oct. 9, 1997	El Diario La Prensa; New York One; New York Urban League; New York City Campaign Finance Board; WNYC-FM	Dennis Walcott	YouTube	P	P	P

=== Results ===
In the end, Giuliani won 58% of the vote to Messinger's 41%, becoming the first Republican to win a second term as Mayor of New York City since Fiorello H. LaGuardia in 1941. Voter turnout was the lowest in 12 years, with only 38% of registered voters casting ballots. The margin of victory was not quite as large as pre-election polls had predicted; analysis of the vote showed that Giuliani made modest gains amongst African-American and Hispanic voters while maintaining his solid base of white, Asian and Jewish voters from 1993.

In his acceptance speech, Giuliani acknowledged the image of divisiveness he had acquired during his first term and vowed to correct it: "Whether you voted for me or against me, whether you voted or didn't vote, I'm your Mayor, this is your administration. We have to do a better job of serving all of you. We have to reach out to all of you. And if we haven't, I apologize. I'm sorry and it is my personal commitment that we will try, endlessly and tirelessly, to bring all of you into the kind of success and optimism we have in this room."

In her concession speech, Messinger said, "Tonight, we lost a battle but the war goes on ... Our schools still don't work ... and they are still worth fighting for. We gave it everything we had."

Candidate	Party	Manhattan	The Bronx	Brooklyn	Queens	Staten Island	Total	%
Rudolph Giuliani	Republican-Liberal	138,718	81,897	173,343	176,751	45,120	615,829	55.2%
Rudolph Giuliani	Republican-Liberal	50.9%	43.6%	53.3%	64.6%	78.6%	615,829	55.2%
Ruth Messinger	Democratic	128,478	102,979	145,349	92,194	10,288	479,288	42.9%
Ruth Messinger	Democratic	47.1%	54.8%	44.7%	33.7%	17.9%	479,288	42.9%
All others		5,534	2,901	6,259	4,586	1,961	21,241	1.9%
All others		2.0%	1.5%	1.9%	1.7%	3.4%	21,241	1.9%
T O T A L		272,730	187,777	324,951	273,531	57,369	1,116,358	100%

=== Voter demographics ===
The 1997 NYC mayoral election by demographic subgroup
Demographic subgroup	Messinger	Giuliani	% of total vote
Total vote	43	57	100
Ideology
Liberals	55	43	33
Moderates	38	61	42
Conservatives	23	72	23
Party
Democrats	54	45	61
Republicans	6	92	19
Independents/Other	34	65	19
Gender
Men	36	62	45
Women	45	54	55
Race
White	21	76	53
Black	79	20	21
Hispanic	57	43	20
Age
18–29 years old	40	59	15
30–44 years old	47	50	33
45–59 years old	42	56	26
60 and older	32	67	26
Family income
Under $15,000	56	42	16
$15,000–30,000	47	50	21
$30,000–50,000	42	57	24
$50,000–75,000	31	67	20
$75,000–100,000	33	61	9
Over $100,000	28	71	10
Union households
Union	45	52	42
Non-union	37	62	58
Religion
Protestant	55	43	13
Catholic	32	66	41
Other Christian	60	37	10
Jewish	27	72	23
Other	64	34	7
None	56	42	6
