= Stanley Michels =

Politician

Member of the New York City Council
- In office January 1, 1989 – December 31, 2001
- Preceded by: Arlene Stringer
- Succeeded by: Robert Jackson
- Constituency: 6th district (1978–1991); 7th district (1991–2001)

Personal details
- Born: January 28, 1933 (age 93) Manhattan, New York, U.S.
- Died: August 1, 2008 (aged 75) Manhattan, New York, U.S.
- Party: Democratic
- Spouse: Molly Sokoloff (m. 1960)
- Children: 3
- Education: Hobart College; Cornell University

Stanley Michels was a politician and member of the Democratic Party who was elected to the New York City Council and served from years 1978 to 2001.

== Early life ==
Stanley Ernest Michels was born in Manhattan on January 28, 1933. He was the son of Lewis and Anne Strasberg Michels. His parents owned a handbag factory. He has a sister named Ellen Grant.

Michels graduated from Hobart College (now known as Hobart and William Smith Colleges) in 1955 and received a law degree from Cornell in 1958. He then served in the Army Judge Advocate General's Corps. While in private law practice in New York, he was also a legal counsel to the State Department of Taxation and Finance.

Michels married Molly Sokoloff in the year 1960. They have a son named Jeffrey. They have two daughters named Karen Michels and Shari R. Michels. Shari is a New York Civil Court judge. Stanley has three grandchildren.

== New York City Council ==
Michels was elected to the City Council in 1978. He represented districts in northern Manhattan (the 6th District and the 7th District) until 2001 when he was barred by running from term limits. He created legislation that mostly focused on reducing pollution and other environmental issues in New York City, like reducing and limiting the use of cigarette smoking indoors and protecting children from lead paint poisoning.

Michels was the prime sponsor of the Clean Indoor Air Act, which was the city's first law regulating smoking in public places. It required that nonsmoking areas be established in all enclosed public spaces designed to accommodate more than 10 people. It was introduced to the New York CIty Council in the year 1987.

That law was expanded by two subsequent laws, including the complete ban on smoking in bars and restaurants adopted in 2003 at the urging of Mayor Michael R. Bloomberg.

Michels was also involved with renovating the abandoned Delafield Hospital into the Fort Washington Houses senior housing complex.

== Passing ==
Michels died on August 1, 2008 in Manhattan at the age of 75 from cancer. A promenade in Fort Tryon Park in northern Manhattan is named in his honor.
