= Jeffrey Omura =

American actor and labor leader (born 1985)

- Born: April 23, 1985 (age 41); Lansing, Michigan, U.S.
- Education: Carnegie Mellon University (BA)
- Occupations: Actor, politician, labor organizer
- Years active: 2007–present
- Political party: Democratic

Jeffrey Omura (born April 23, 1985) is an American actor, politician, and labor organizer. He has appeared on TV shows such as Succession, Hawaii Five-0, Blue Bloods, and Gossip Girl, as well as onstage with The Public Theater, Weston Playhouse, and Hartford Stage.

== Early life and education ==
Jeffrey Omura was born at the Sparrow Hospital in Lansing, Michigan on April 23, 1985, and raised in the suburb of Okemos, Michigan. Omura is of Japanese descent, the third child of Linda Omura (née Ratliff) and Glenn Omura. He graduated from Carnegie Mellon University in 2007.

== Career ==
=== Acting ===
Omura has acted in several theatre roles (see acting credits below). In 2007, Omura was cast in The Public Theater's Shakespeare in the Park production of Romeo and Juliet, directed by Michael Greif. In 2008, Omura earned his Actors' Equity Association union card performing in The Plant That Ate Dirty Socks, an early musical written by Tony Award nominee Joe Iconis (based on the children's book series of the same name, written by Nancy McArthur).

Omura made his television debut on The CW's Gossip Girl episode "Desperately Seeking Serena," playing Todd Jansen, the ex-boyfriend of Nelly Yuki. The American Broadcasting Company (ABC) featured Omura in its 2009 Walt Disney Television Casting Project showcase.

=== Political campaigning ===
Omura was a volunteer for the 2004 John Kerry campaign, registering students in Okemos to vote. In 2008, Omura spent a month as a full-time field organizer for the Barack Obama campaign in Lansing. In 2018, Omura campaigned for congressional candidate Katie Hill in Santa Clarita, California. Omura helped organize a last minute campaign for Presidential candidate Kamala Harris called Queers for Kamala in 2024. He took part in two 2020 Democratic campaigns: first, Elizabeth Warren's Democratic Primary campaign in New Hampshire; and then Joe Biden's Presidential campaign in Philadelphia, Pennsylvania.

=== Actors' Equity ===
In 2016, the Actors' Equity Association renegotiated its agreement with the Off-Broadway League of Theaters. Omura created and led the Fair Wage On Stage grassroots movement to demand higher wages. Equity was able to negotiate record-breaking wage increases from 32% to 83%. In 2017, Omura ran for a seat on Equity's National Council and won a three-year term. In 2018, he was elected the chair of the International Actors Committee, allowing him to advocate for immigrant artists. Omura was re-elected to Equity's Council in 2020; during this second term, he helped and supported union members during an industry-wide shutdown due to the COVID-19 pandemic. He helped resolve a public jurisdictional battle between SAG-AFTRA and Equity. Omura was an organizer for #BeAnArtsHero, an advocacy group focused on securing federal relief for the arts sector in 2020. The campaign lobbied for the funding that was eventually included in the $15 billion arts relief package.

In 2021, City & State named Omura in their "Labor 40 Under 40" list in recognition of his work with Actors' Equity Association.

=== New York City Council ===
Omura ran unsuccessfully to represent New York City Council District 6 in 2021, losing the Democratic primary to then-Manhattan Borough President Gale Brewer.

2021 New York City Council election, district 6
Primary election
Party	Candidate	Votes	%
Democratic	Gale Brewer	21,594	54.8%
Democratic	Maria Danzilo	5,834	14.8%
Democratic	Sara Lind	5,166	13.1%
Democratic	Jeffrey Omura	3,922	9.9%
Democratic	David Gold	1,867	4.7%
Democratic	Zack Weiner	959	2.4%
Democratic	Write-ins	57	0.1%
Total votes		39,399	100.0%

== Acting credits ==
=== Television ===
Year	Title	Role	Season/Episode
2008	Gossip Girl	Todd Jansen	1/15
2011	Damages	Henry Thain	4/3
2011	White Collar	Chad Stewart	3/6
2013	The Michael J. Fox Show	Ted	1/5
2014	Blue Bloods	Patrick Dunleavy	4/18
2014	High Maintenance	Brandon	2/2
2016	Limitless	Danny	1/12, 1/19/, 1/21
2016	The Blacklist	Trey	3/21, 3/22
2016	The Interestings	Robert Takahashi	All
2017	Gone	Kyle Parrish	1/2
2018	Elementary	Sonny Kwan	6/2
2018	Succession	Rob	1/7

=== Theatre ===
Year	Production	Role(s)	Director / Production or Location	Notes	Ref.
2007	Romeo & Juliet	Ensemble	Michael Greif, Shakespeare in the Park	Off-Broadway	
2008	The Plant That Ate Dirty Socks	Jason; Mackenzie	Joe Iconis, TheatreWorks USA	Off-Broadway	
2013	La Dispute	Azor	Darko Tresnjak, Hartford Stage	Regional	
2014	A Midsummer Night's Dream		Paul Mason Barnes, Repertory Theater of St. Louis	Regional	
2015	Charles Francis Chan, Jr.'s Exotic Oriental Murder Mystery	Charles Francis Chan (Frank Chan); Hastings	Ed Iskandar, NAATCO	Off-Broadway	
2016	House Rules	JJ	Ralph Pena, Ma-Yi	Off-Broadway	
2016	Hamlet	Horatio	Patricia McGregor, The Public Theater	Off-Broadway	
2017	Captain Brassbound's Conversion	Felix Drinkwater	David Staller, Gingold Theatrical Group	Off-Broadway	
2018	Hello from the Children of Planet Earth	William	Jade King Carroll, Playwrights' Realm	Off-Broadway	
2019	Who's Afraid of Virginia Woolf	Nick	Mike Donahue, Weston Playhouse	Regional	
2019	Fruiting Bodies	Eddie; Morel; ten-year old	Shelley Butler, Ma-Yi	Off-Broadway	
2019	On That Day in Amsterdam	Kevin	Kareem Fahmy, Cherry Lane Theatre	Off-Broadway	
2019	Take Me Out				
2022	Change Agent	Cord Meyer	Craig Lucas, Arena Stage	Regional	
	King Lear		Ed Iskandar, Exit, Pursued by a Bear		
	Macbeth	Lennox		Regional	
