= Scott Stringer =

American politician (born 1960)

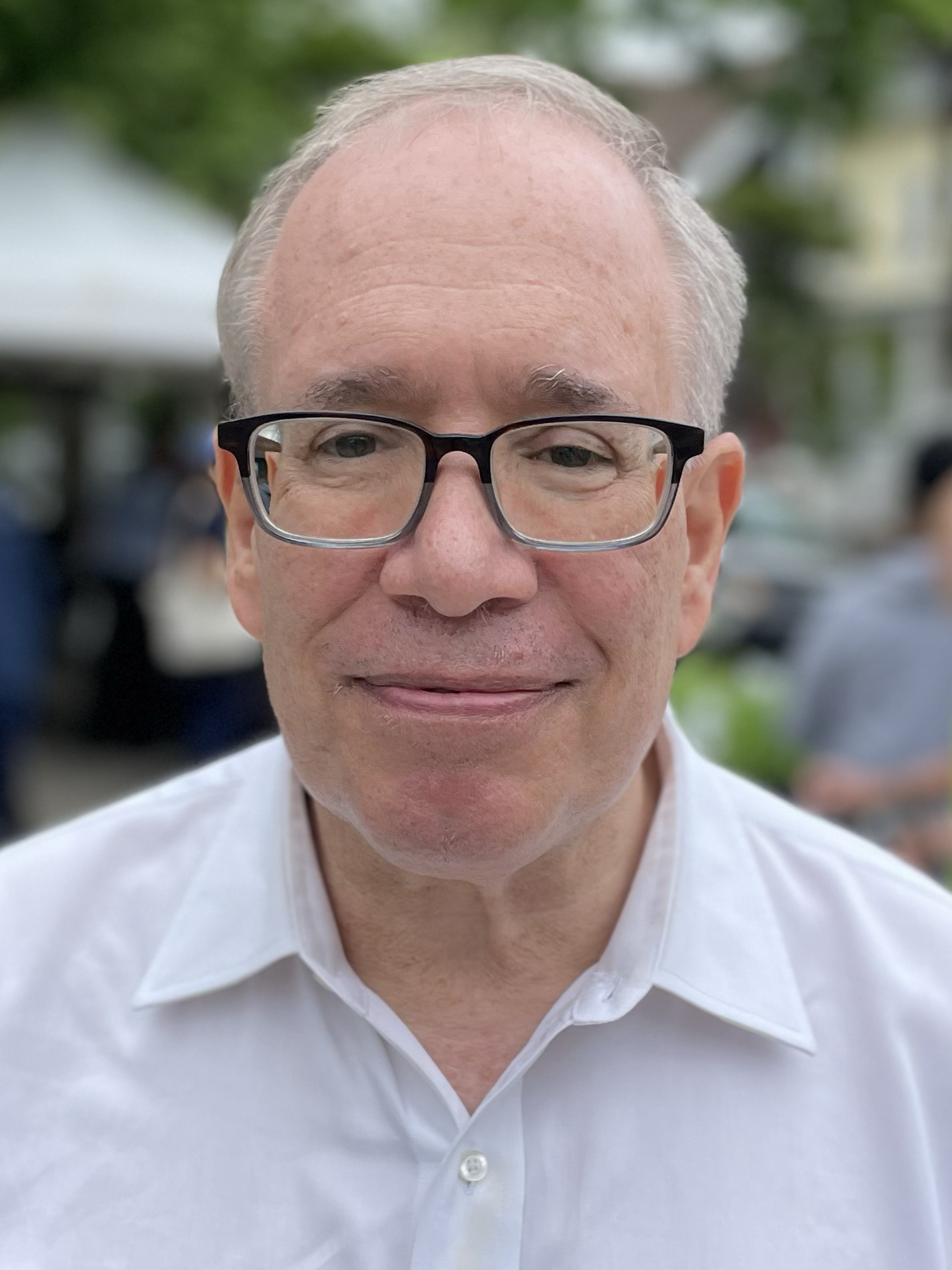
- Stringer in 2025

44th Comptroller of New York City
- In office January 1, 2014 – December 31, 2021
- Preceded by: John Liu
- Succeeded by: Brad Lander

26th Borough President of Manhattan
- In office January 1, 2006 – December 31, 2013
- Preceded by: C. Virginia Fields
- Succeeded by: Gale Brewer

Member of the New York State Assembly from the 67th district
- In office January 1, 1993 – December 31, 2005
- Preceded by: Jerry Nadler
- Succeeded by: Linda Rosenthal

Personal details
- Born: April 29, 1960 (age 66) New York City, New York, U.S.
- Party: Democratic
- Spouse: Elyse Buxbaum (m. 2010)
- Children: 2
- Relatives: Arlene Stringer-Cuevas (mother); Bella Abzug (first cousin once removed)
- Education: John Jay College of Criminal Justice (BA)

Scott M. Stringer (born April 29, 1960) is an American politician who served as the 44th New York City Comptroller. A Democrat, Stringer also previously served as a New York State Assemblyman, and as the 26th borough president of Manhattan.

In 1983, Stringer became a legislative assistant to New York State Assemblyman and future United States Congressman Jerry Nadler. In 1992, he successfully ran for a seat in the New York State Assembly vacated by Nadler, covering the Upper West Side. Stringer served as New York State Assemblyman for 13 years and six terms, from 1992 until 2005, when he was elected the 26th borough president of Manhattan. He won the 2013 election to become New York City's 44th comptroller, and began serving on January 1, 2014.

Stringer was an unsuccessful candidate in the 2021 and in the 2025 Democratic primaries for mayor of New York City.

== Early life and education ==
Stringer is Jewish, and was born and raised in Washington Heights in Upper Manhattan. His mother, Arlene Stringer-Cuevas, was a cousin of former U.S. Representative Bella Abzug, and served on the New York City Council before working in the New York City Human Resources Administration. His father, Ronald Stringer, was counsel to former New York City Mayor Abe Beame. His stepfather, Carlos Cuevas, was at one time the New York City clerk and a Deputy Borough President in the Bronx.

Stringer attended Manhattan public schools, including PS 152, JHS 52, and John F. Kennedy High School (where he was editor of the school newspaper). When Stringer was still in high school at age 16, then-Manhattan Borough President Percy Sutton named Stringer to the Community Planning Board. Stringer graduated from the John Jay College of Criminal Justice with a Bachelor of Arts in Government Studies in 1986.

He has distant roots from Russia and Ireland, he has said, and his great-grandfather was from Poland.

== Career ==
In 1983, he became a legislative assistant to New York State Assemblyman, and future Congressman, Jerry Nadler. During these years, he supported Democratic candidate Governor Mario Cuomo.

=== New York State Assembly ===
In 1992, Stringer ran for and won Nadler's New York State Assembly seat representing the Upper West Side, when Nadler replaced deceased Congressman Ted Weiss. Stringer served for 13 years and six terms in the New York State Assembly, from 1992 until 2005. In 1999, when he was 17 years old, future New York State Assemblyman Micah Lasher was an informal adviser to Stringer.

During his Assembly career, Stringer served as Chairman of the Cities Committee, Chairman of the Real Property Taxation Committee, and Chairman of the Oversight, Analysis and Investigation Committee. He led the fight to end empty seat voting and reform the State Assembly's rules of operation. He authored anti-stalking legislation and was an advocate of affordable housing, and good government reform.

In 1999, Stringer was arrested at a police brutality protest outside 1 Police Plaza following the shooting of Amadou Diallo. Later that year, Stringer organized a counter-rally to a Ku Klux Klan march.

On August 28, 2001, Village Voice political writer Wayne Barrett wrote a piece entitled, "Mother Dearest & the Courthouse Cabal", in which he discussed Stringer's involvement in courtroom politics, specifically questioning how Stringer's parents had benefited financially from his political ties, and whether some of his campaign contributors had done unethical things. Barrett also raised questions about whether acting Supreme Court judge Louis York had attempted to gain Stringer's support in his bid for a full term on the court by appointing Stringer's mother nine times as a court evaluator and conservator. In 2001, while a member of the Assembly, Stringer explored a run for New York City Public Advocate.

=== Manhattan Borough President ===
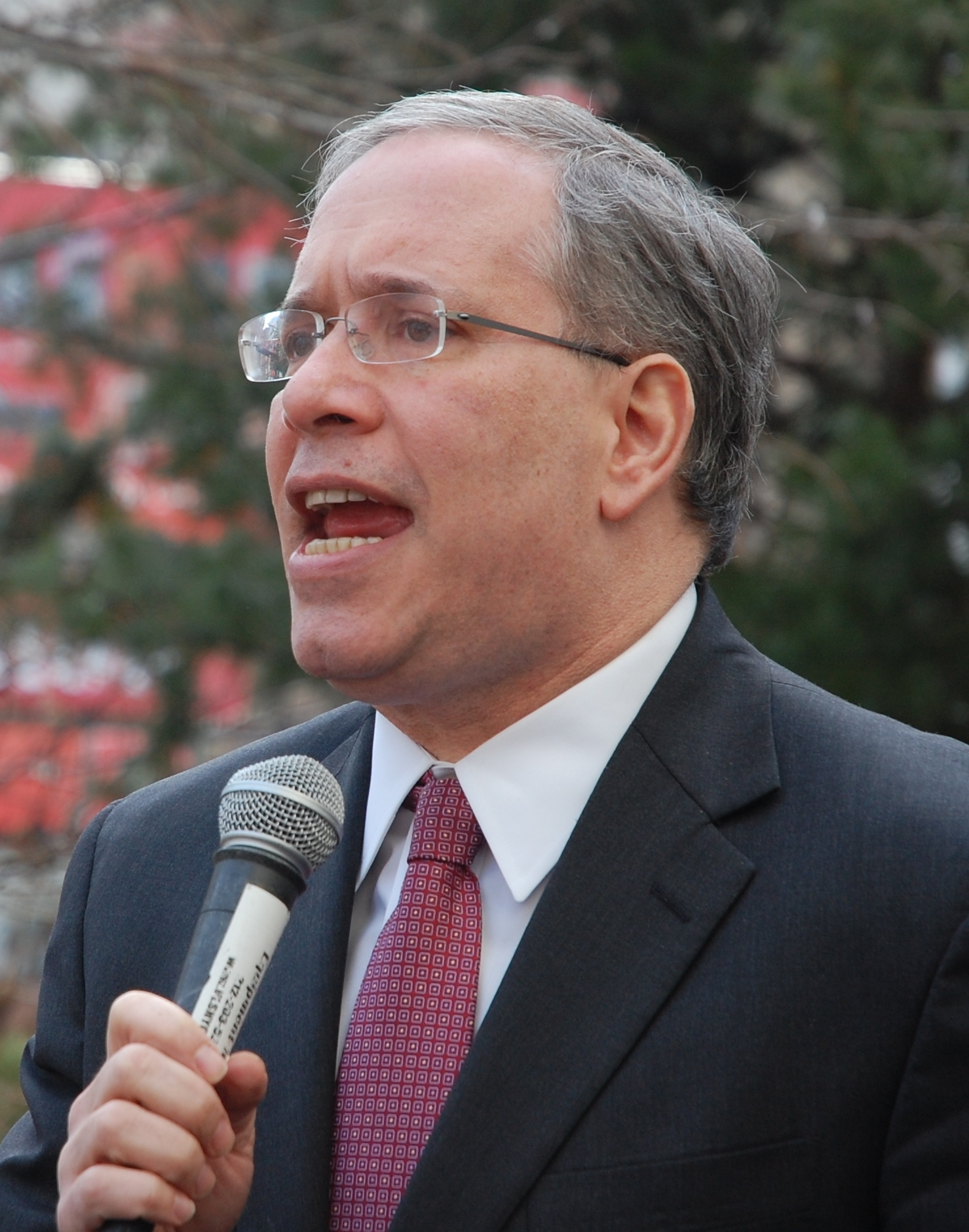
Stringer in 2011

In 2005, he entered the race to succeed C. Virginia Fields as Manhattan Borough President. His candidacy was endorsed by The New York Times. In September 2005, he won the Democratic primary against 9 other candidates and was later elected in the November general election. He took office as Borough President on January 1, 2006.

Stringer issued over 40 policy reports designed to raise awareness about local issues and improve New York City. These reports have led the charge in addressing many of Manhattan's most important challenges and issues, including: increasing community input and response to development and planning projects across the borough; introducing comprehensive reform and empowerment measures to Manhattan's Community Boards; leading the fight to maintain and create new affordable housing units and schools across the borough; empowering parents to better participate in the public school system; investigating and recommending policy action on the city's many transportation issues; and helping working families and small businesses access resources to become and remain self-sufficient.

==== Food policy ====
In November 2008 and December 2009 as Borough President, he hosted day-long conferences on the subject of progressive food policy. For the second conference, attended by 1,000 New Yorkers, he joined with New York University and the not-for-profit Just Food to address the impact of food on the health of New York City's people and their environment. He released several policy reports on food policy, including "Food in the Public Interest", "FoodStat", and "Red Tape, Green Vegetables".

==== Bike lanes ====
Throughout his tenure as Borough President, Stringer supported new transportation initiatives such as bike lanes. After numerous constituent complaints, in 2010 he undertook a survey, "Respect the Lane – Clear the Path", a policy report analyzing bike lane safety in Manhattan. During the course of the three-day survey, a total of 1,700 infractions were witnessed. The survey found that while bike lanes have a tremendous positive impact on New York City, the lanes were being misused by all parties; pedestrians, motorists, and cyclists. Working with community leaders, elected officials, local businesses, and local residents, Stringer worked to raise awareness about bike lane safety, and recommended an "increase in protected bicycle lanes, which are separated from traffic by a physical barrier and stepped-up patrol by traffic enforcement agents to ticket scofflaws, along with better signage," among other ideas.

==== Hydraulic fracturing ====
Stringer led the fight in New York City against hydraulic fracturing in New York State. Stringer hosted many Manhattan Community Boards to discuss the potential problems associated with "fracking", such as contamination to the water supply. Stringer also released a policy report in 2009, Uncalculated Risk: How Plans to Drill for Gas in Upstate New York could threaten New York City's Water System, a report highlighting the impacts of "fracking".

==== 2009 re-election ====
On November 6, 2008, Stringer announced his decision to seek re-election as Manhattan Borough President. His Republican opponent, David Casavis, a history professor and foreign affairs writer/commentator, got 16% of the vote on a platform to abolish the office. In an October 5, 2009, article in City Limits, Stringer dismissed calls by Casavis and Mayor Michael Bloomberg to eliminate his office: "There are people who are going to call for the elimination of the public advocate office, borough president, the City Council. There are people who believe that we should have a king system here," says Stringer. "Borough presidents are part of a new era and a different kind of government. It has real responsibilities and it gives you a large footprint on the issues you get involved with. It's up to the individual to take advantage of that, that you might have an impact."

=== United States Senate consideration ===
In Spring 2009, Stringer considered a primary challenge to incumbent U.S. Senator Kirsten Gillibrand. However, he announced in May 2009 that he would not run. In his statement he said: "In light of President Obama's clear desire to avoid a Democratic primary in New York State, I have decided to focus on my re-election race for Manhattan Borough President and to suspend my exploratory committee and fund-raising efforts for the 2010 Senate race. I firmly believe that innovative thinking on issues like education and the urban environment must be joined with bedrock Democratic values on gun control and immigration if New York's interests are to be effectively represented in Washington."

=== New York City Comptroller ===
==== 2013 election ====
Stringer was the Democratic nominee for New York City Comptroller in the 2013 election. He defeated former New York Governor Eliot Spitzer in the Democratic primary.

Stringer was considered one of several contenders for the 2013 New York City Mayoral primary before he announced in mid-November 2012 that he would instead run for city comptroller in the 2013 election. His campaign team included spokesperson Audrey Gelman, advertising agency GMMB, and pollster Mark Mellman. Stringer was challenged by former New York Governor Eliot Spitzer in the Democratic party primary. Stringer, originally thought to have the lead unopposed, trailed Spitzer in the polls until late August, when he took a two-point lead. Stringer defeated Spitzer in the September 10 primary 52%–48%. In the days prior to the Democratic primary, several media outlets published a piece describing Stringer's vote against legislation that stripped NAMBLA of its tax-exempt status.

==== Tenure ====
During his tenure as Comptroller, Stringer was known for his moody demeanor. Former City Council Member Ben Kallos reflected on being bullied and cursed at by Stringer. Former Council Member Helen Rosenthal recounted an organization's director getting a "tongue lashing (like) she had never experienced before." And other former staffer members said he could be a "cruel and mercurial manager, prone to outbursts at subordinates."

In 2014, Stringer criticized the health department's response to complaints about rats in New York City as "weak", because they failed in their oversight and their inability to follow their own procedures.

In November 2014, Comptroller Stringer announced an initiative, on behalf of the $160 billion New York City Pension Funds, to give long-term shareholders the right to nominate their own directors at 75 U.S. companies. The "proxy access" initiative, known as the Boardroom Accountability Project, requests that these companies change their bylaws to allow shareholders who meet a threshold of owning three percent of a company for three or more years the right to list their director candidates, representing up to 25 percent of the board, on a given company's proxy. Proxy access is the ability for shareowners to nominate directors to run against a company's chosen slate of director candidates on the corporate ballot. The 75 proposals were filed based on three priority issues: climate change, board diversity and excessive CEO pay. Stringer called proxy access "the defining issue for the 2015 proxy season".

While Stringer initially waffled on support for Amazon HQ2, he eventually came out against it.

==== 2017 election ====
In 2017, there was no Democratic primary for the position with Stringer defeating Republican Michel Faulkner in the general election.

=== New York City mayoral candidacies ===
==== 2021 election ====
On September 8, 2020, Stringer formally announced his candidacy for Mayor of New York City. He was endorsed by a number of progressive politicians shortly after his announcement, such as Jerry Nadler, Adriano Espaillat, Jamaal Bowman, Alessandra Biaggi, Julia Salazar, Yuh-Line Niou, Jessica Ramos, and others. At his announcement, he criticized incumbent mayor de Blasio saying: "We never closed the book on a tale of two cities. If anything over the last eight years, we've written more chapters."

In April and June 2021, two women accused Stringer of sexual misconduct. Stringer denied the allegation and sued the latter woman for defamation, which was still pending as of March 2025. In May 2021, City & State published an article detailing allegations of bullying by former employees of Stringer, although noting that some who were contacted disputed that characterization.

Stringer finished in fifth place with 5.0% of the vote.

==== 2025 election ====
On January 18, 2024, Stringer announced that he was forming an exploratory committee to determine whether he should run for mayor in the 2025 New York City mayoral election. Stringer officially launched his mayoral campaign in January 2025.

Stringer again finished in 5th place, this time with 1.7% of the vote.

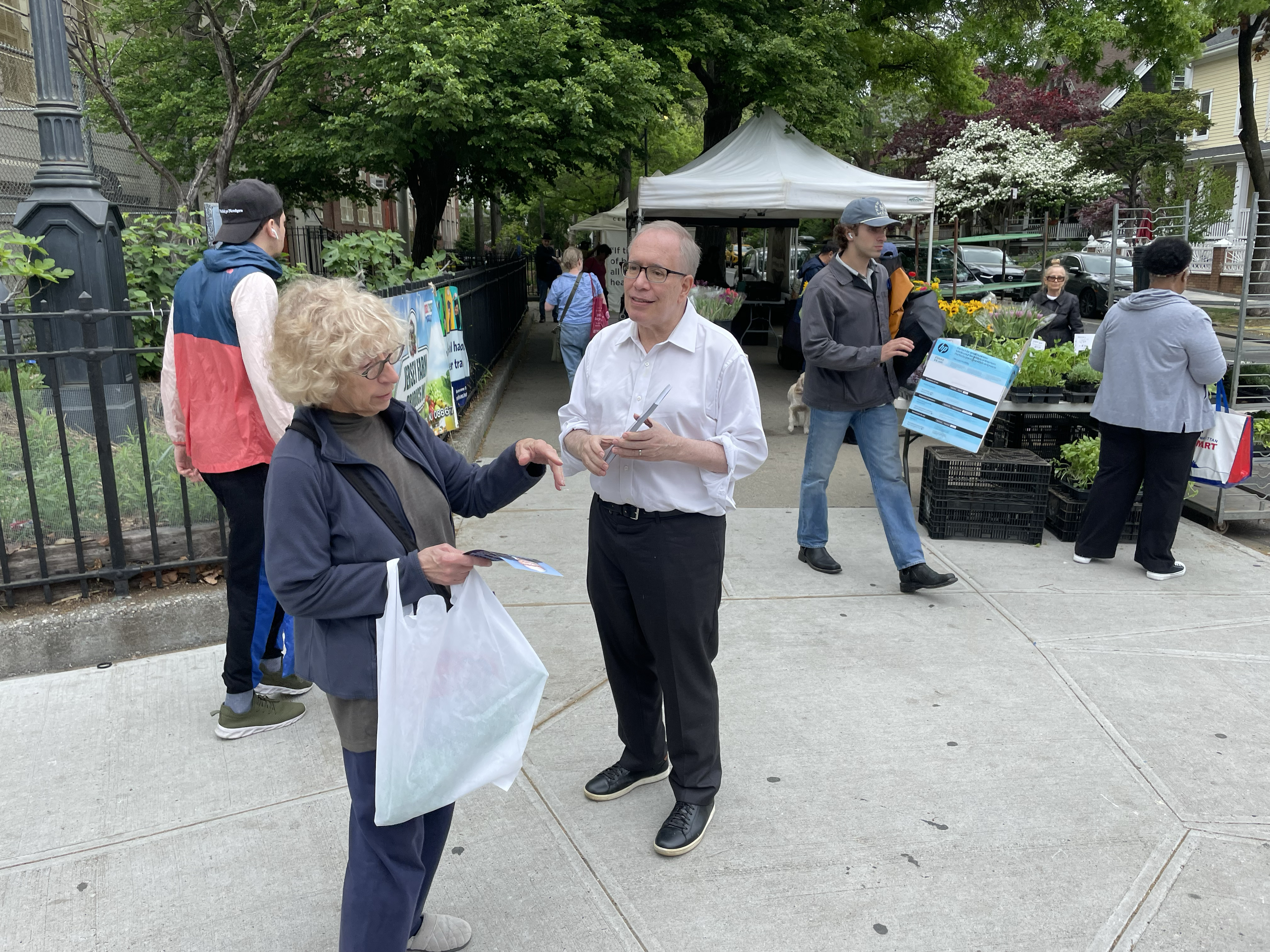
Scott Stringer discussing issues with a person on Sunday, May 4, 2025, at the Cortelyou Farmer's Market

=== Post-2025 Activities ===
Stringer is suspected of creating a new super political action committee(PAC) called Real Fight NYC. It is partially funded by donors who are members of United Federation of Teachers. The super-PAC has been funding Antonio Reynoso's campaign to get elected to the House of Representatives in the 7th Congressional district in 2026.

== Personal life ==
On September 3, 2010, Stringer married Elyse Buxbaum, an arts administrator at the time, who is the deputy director of development at The Jewish Museum. The couple chose to receive a marriage license in Connecticut as a statement of solidarity with LGBT couples who had not yet been given the right to marry in New York State. They have two sons, Max and Miles.

== Bibliography ==
- Paterson, David (2020). Black, Blind, & in Charge: A Story of Visionary Leadership and Overcoming Adversity. New York.

Political offices
Preceded by C. Virginia Fields	Borough President of Manhattan; 2006–2013	Succeeded by Gale Brewer
Preceded by John Liu	Comptroller of New York City; 2014–2021	Succeeded by Brad Lander
