= Ruth Messinger =

American politician (born 1940)

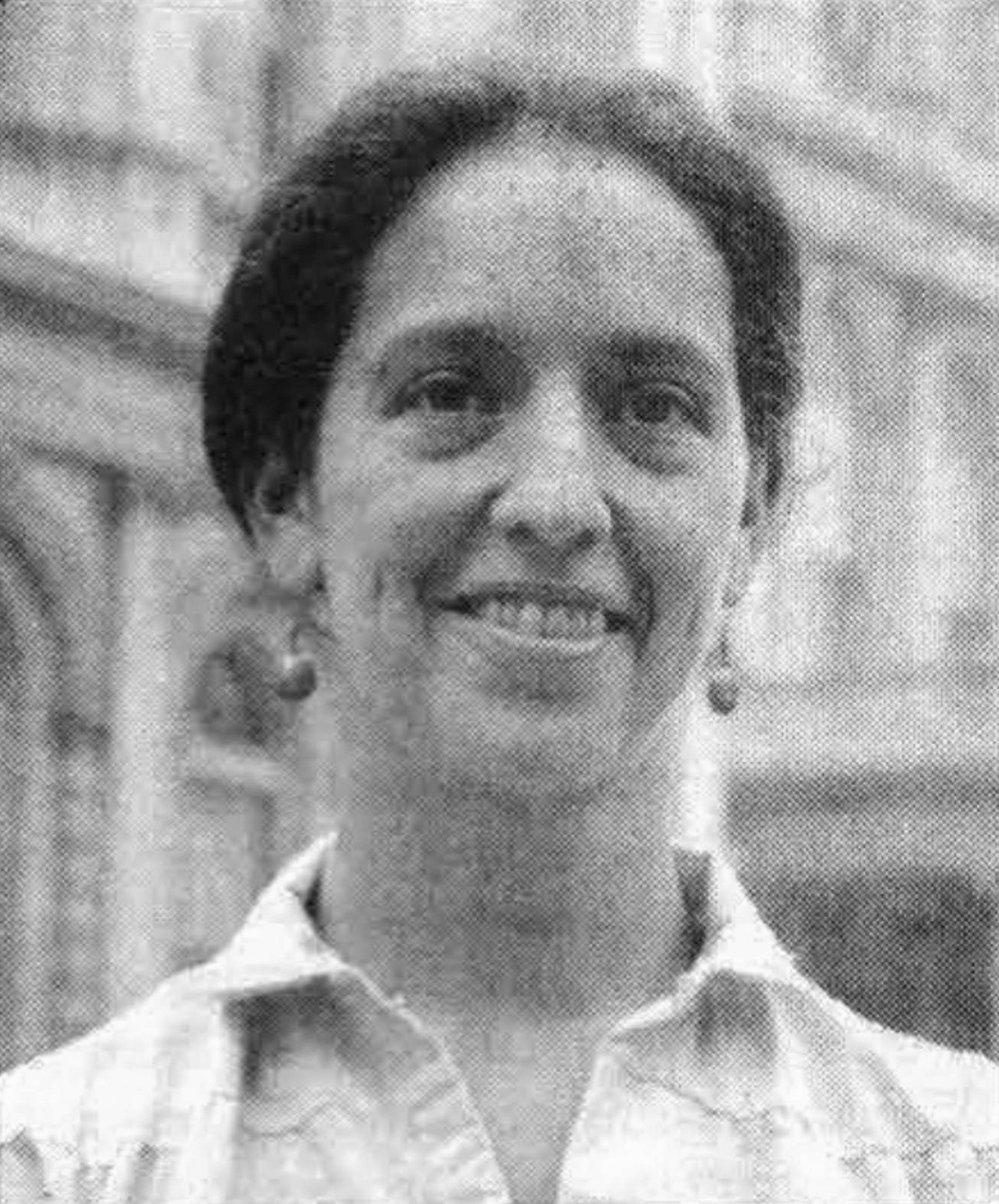
- Messinger c. 1980

24th Borough President of Manhattan
- In office January 1, 1990 – December 31, 1997
- Preceded by: David Dinkins
- Succeeded by: C. Virginia Fields

Member of the New York City Council from the 4th district
- In office January 1, 1978 – December 31, 1988
- Preceded by: Henry T. Berger
- Succeeded by: Ronnie Eldridge

Personal details
- Born: Ruth Wyler; November 6, 1940 (age 86) New York City, New York, U.S.
- Party: Democratic
- Other political affiliations: Democratic Socialists of America
- Spouses: Eli Messinger (1962–before 1989); Andrew Lachman (1989–2025)
- Children: 3
- Education: Harvard University (BA); University of Oklahoma (MSW)

Ruth Messinger (née Wyler; born November 6, 1940) is a former American political leader in New York City and a member of the Democratic Party. She was the Democratic nominee for Mayor of New York City in 1997, losing to incumbent mayor Rudy Giuliani.

== Early life and education ==
Ruth Wyler was born on November 6, 1940, on the Upper West Side to Wilfred and Marjorie Wyler. Her maternal grandfather, I. Edwin Goldwasser was a notable educator and businessman. In 1953, she had the first Bat Mitzvah at Park Avenue Synagogue. Messinger attended the Brearley School. She was politically active at a young age, wearing buttons for social justice causes, volunteering at the settlement house, attending rallies in support of Adlai Stevenson II, and participating in anti-war and civil rights activities.

Wyler graduated from Radcliffe College of Harvard University in 1962 and enrolled in Columbia University in pursuit of her master's in social work. She married Eli Messinger, a physician, with whom she moved to Oklahoma in 1963, before completing her work. Messinger returned to her studies at the University of Oklahoma, earning her Master of Social Work in 1964. After she graduated, Messinger ran the child welfare programs in two Western Oklahoma counties part-time while raising her first child.

While living in Oklahoma, Messinger was recruited by the Democratic Party and campaigned for its candidates, including Lyndon B. Johnson and Fred R. Harris.

In 1965, the Messinger family returned to New York. Ruth Messinger continued doing case work and participated in a major social welfare research study. She volunteered building the anti-war movement, worked with Women Strike for Peace, and set up a service counseling young, poor men of color looking to resist the draft. In 1968, she worked with a group of parents to launch the Children’s Community Workshop School.

In 1962, Messinger married Eli Messinger, with whom she has three children. The couple later separated in the 1970s before divorcing in the 1980s. Messinger later married her second husband, Andrew Lachman, in 1989; they remained married until his death in 2025.

== Political career ==
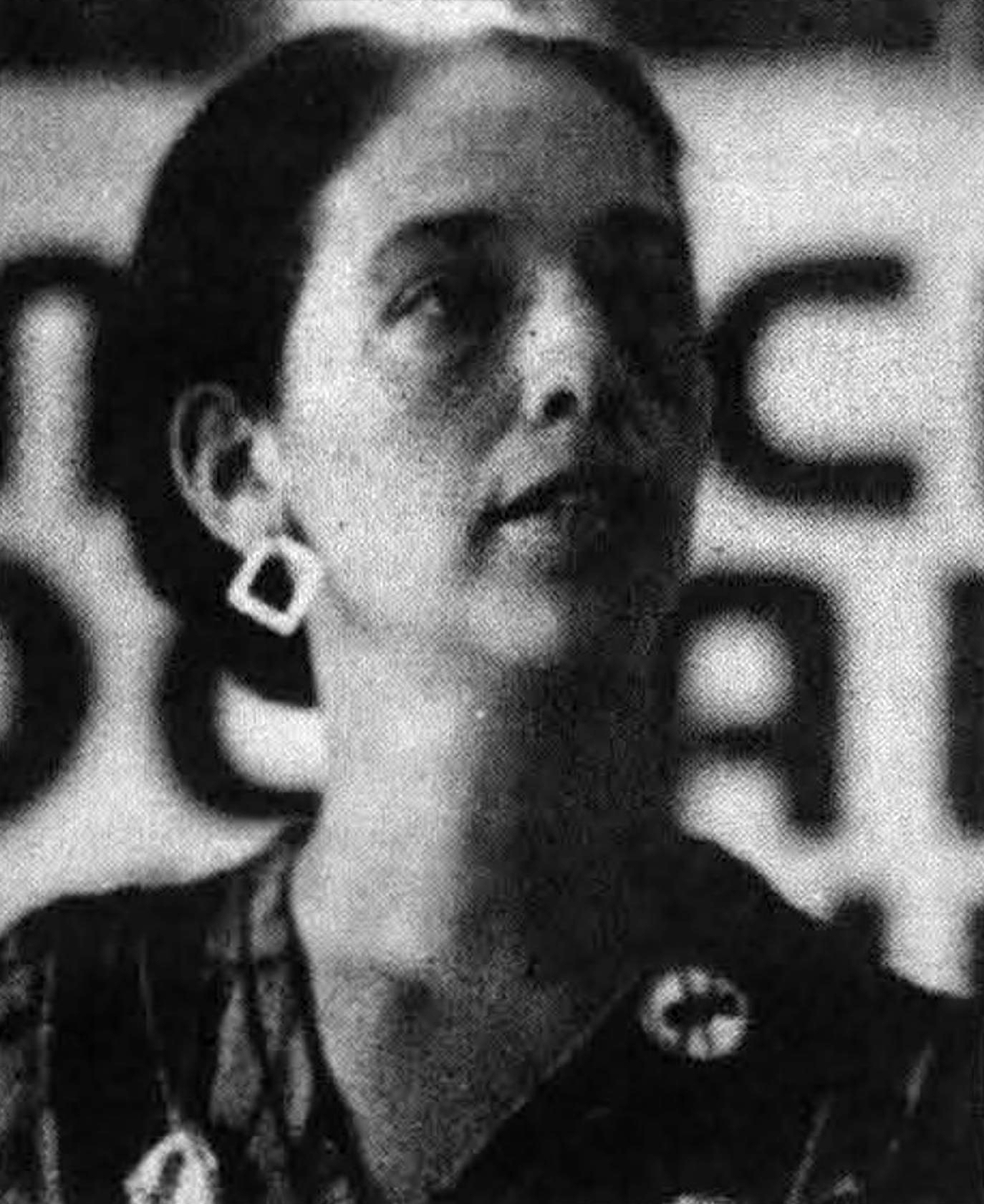
Messinger at a Democratic Socialists of America caucus held at the 1980 DNC

In 1974, Messinger was asked to run for the school board. She won the seat and served from 1975 to 1977. In 1976, she ran for a seat on the New York State Assembly, but lost the election. The next year, she won a seat on the City Council, representing the Upper West Side. She was reelected in 1982 and 1985. While on the City Council, she proposed extending rent control from individuals to businesses.

Messinger was a delegate to the 1980 Democratic National Convention In From 1990 to 1998, she served as Manhattan borough president, an office she gave up to unsuccessfully run for mayor in the 1997 election. Her candidacy made her the city's first female Democratic mayoral candidate.

A political liberal, Messinger was known for her advocacy on behalf of public schools, efforts to achieve compromise between developers and neighborhood activists, and her aggressive media work. She is pro-choice and opposes the death penalty. During her 1997 campaign, she was nearly forced into a Democratic primary runoff with Reverend Al Sharpton, but avoided it by receiving 40% of the vote during a recount. She ultimately lost to Giuliani but received more than 500,000 votes.

Ferrer had briefly run against her for mayor in 1997, before dropping out to endorse Messinger and then run for reelection as Bronx borough president. In 1997, Messinger stood on the sidelines for a while as Deborah Glick and C. Virginia Fields competed to replace her as Manhattan Borough President. CV Fields became the first female African American borough president in New York City political history after Messinger's last minute endorsement of Fields over Glick.

== Post-political career ==
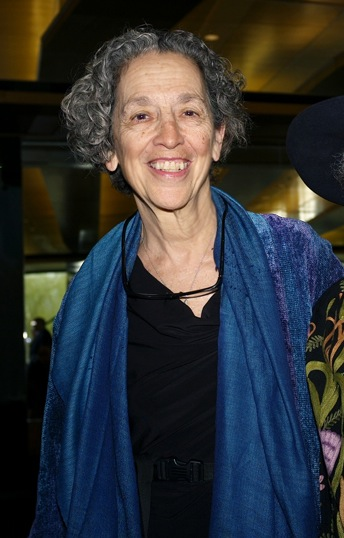
Messinger in 2012

Messinger taught public policy at Hunter College.

From 1998 until 2016, Messinger was President and CEO of American Jewish World Service before transitioning to an Ambassador role with the organization.

Messinger is also a board member of Hazon and a trustee emerita of the Jewish Foundation for Education of Women.

Messinger serves as the inaugural Social Justice Fellow at the Jewish Theological Seminary of America and the Social Justice Activist-in-Residence at the JCC of Manhattan.

In 2020, she served on incoming Queens Borough President Donovan Richards' transition team.

In August 2025, Messinger endorsed Zohran Mamdani in the 2025 New York City mayoral election.

== Honors and awards ==
- 2005: The Forward Fifty
- 2005: Doctor of Humane Letters, Hebrew Union College – Jewish Institute of Religion
- 2006: Albert D. Chernin Award, Jewish Council for Public Affairs
- 2007: Honorary degree, Hebrew College
- 2015: The Forward Fifty
- Honorary Degree, The Jewish Theological Seminary
- Lives of Commitment Breakfast, Auburn Theological Seminary

Political offices
Preceded by Henry T. Berger	Member of the New York City Council from the 4th district 1978–1989	Succeeded by Ronnie Eldridge
Preceded by David Dinkins	Borough President of Manhattan; 1990–1997	Succeeded by C. Virginia Fields
Party political offices
Preceded by David Dinkins	Democratic nominee for Mayor of New York; 1997	Succeeded by Mark Green
