= Manhattan Community Board 7 =

Place in New York, United States

Manhattan Community District 7
- Community District
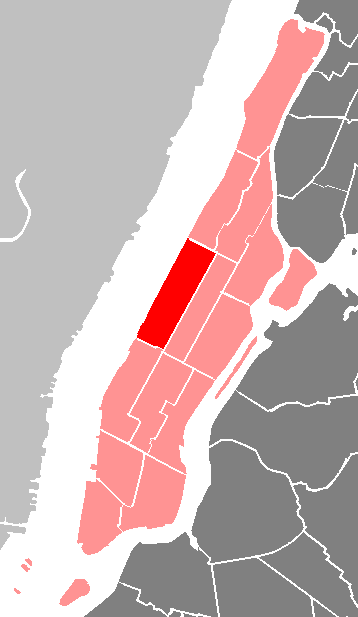
- Country: United States
- State: New York
- City: New York City
- Borough: Manhattan
- Neighborhoods: list: Lincoln Square; Manhattan Valley; Upper West Side

Government
  - Chairperson: Alex Morgan Bell
  - District Manager: Yassiel Nieves

Area
  - Land: 1.9 sq mi (4.9 km^{2})

Population (2010)
  - Total: 212,000 (2,018 estimate)
  - Density: 110,000/sq mi (43,000/km^{2})

Ethnicity
  - Hispanic and Latino Americans: 15.9%
  - African-American: 6.1%
  - White: 65.9%
  - Asian: 9.3%
  - Others: 2.8%
- Time zone: UTC−5 (Eastern)
  - Summer (DST): UTC−4 (EDT)
- ZIP codes: 10023, 10024, 10025 and 10069
- Area code: 212, 646, and 332, and 917
- Police Precinct: 20th (website); 24th (website)
- Website: www.mcb7.org

The Manhattan Community Board 7 is a New York City community board encompassing the neighborhood of the Upper West Side, including Manhattan Valley and Lincoln Square, in the borough of Manhattan.

Its oversight is the Upper West Side of Manhattan, running the length of Central Park from Central Park West to the Hudson River. Specifically, it is delimited by Central Park West on the east, the northern portion of Columbus Circle, West 60th Street, Columbus Avenue (Ninth Avenue), and West 59th Street on the south, the Hudson River on the west and Cathedral Parkway (also known as West 110th Street) on the north.

== 2026 members ==
Alex Morgan Bell serves as Chairperson and Yassiel Nieves is the District Manager. Executive officers of the board include: Richard Asche, Vice Chair; Kevin Reevey, Treasurer; Nandita Venkatesan, Technology & Communications Officer; Jennifer Maulsby, Co-Secretary; and Egor Shakhnovkiy, Co-Secretary.

== 2024 members ==
Beverly Donohue serves as Chairperson and Max Vandervliet is the District Manager. Other executive officers as of 2014 include Doug Kleiman, Vice-Chair, Seema Reddy, Treasurer, Barbara Adler, Co-Secretary and Alex Bell, Co-Secretary.

== Activities ==
Community Boards, including CB7, are local governmental entities that provide neighborhood-level services under the New York City Charter. They play key advisory roles in land use and zoning matters and the city budget and coordinate the delivery of municipal services. CB7 also acts as a bridge between the Upper West Side and the City’s other governmental entities, advocating for and developing policy recommendations from the grassroots level.

The Manhattan Borough President appoints fifty volunteer members. All board members live, work, or otherwise have a vested interest the community.

== Demographics ==
The 2014-2018 census estimates report a population of 212,00, up from 209,100 during the 2010 census. Of them:

- 65.9% are White non-Hispanic
- 15.9% of Hispanic origin
- 6.1% are African American
- 9.3% Asian or Pacific Islander
- 2.8% identify as some other race.
- 22.9% are foreign-born.

In 2012, 12.2% of the population benefits from public assistance.

The land area is 1,222.7 acres, or 1.9 square miles (4.9 km^{2}).
