= Saint Pierre and Miquelon Islanders =

Inhabitants of Saint Pierre and Miquelon

French: Saint Pierrais, Miquelonnais

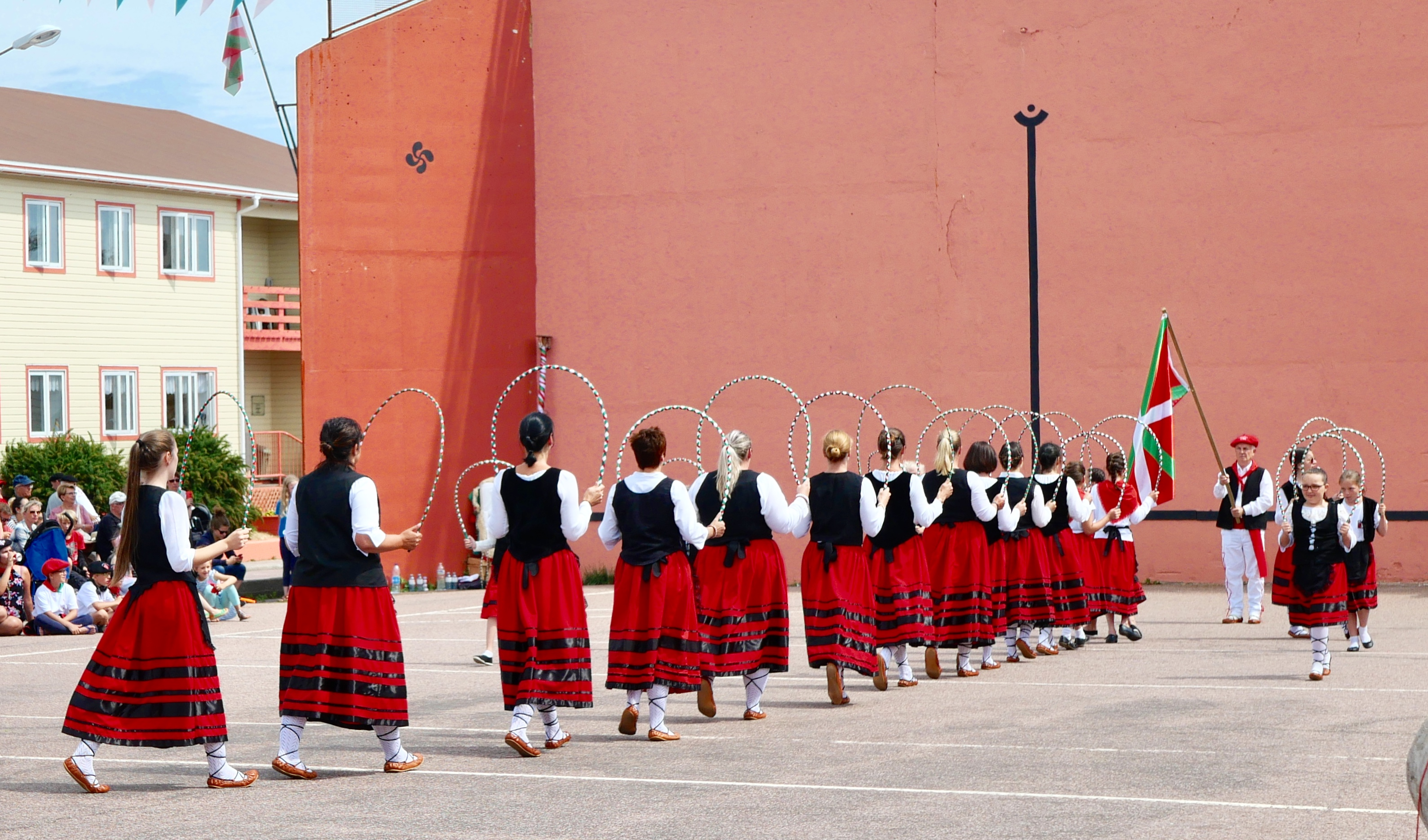
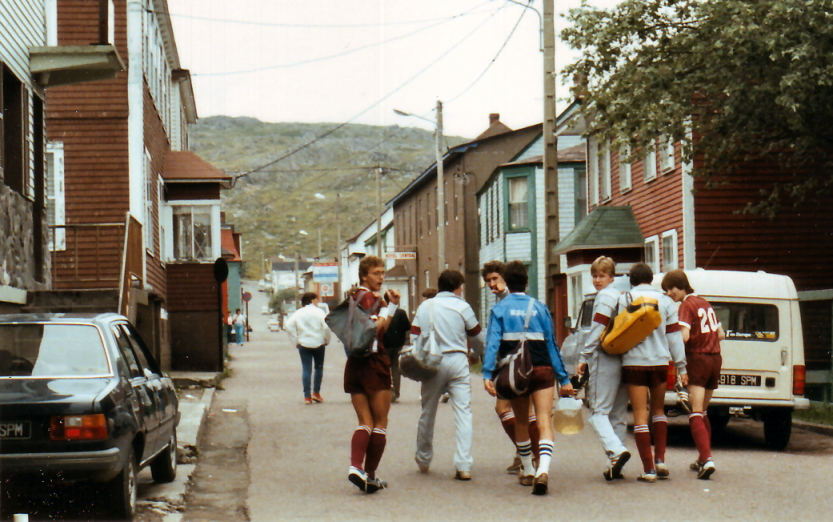
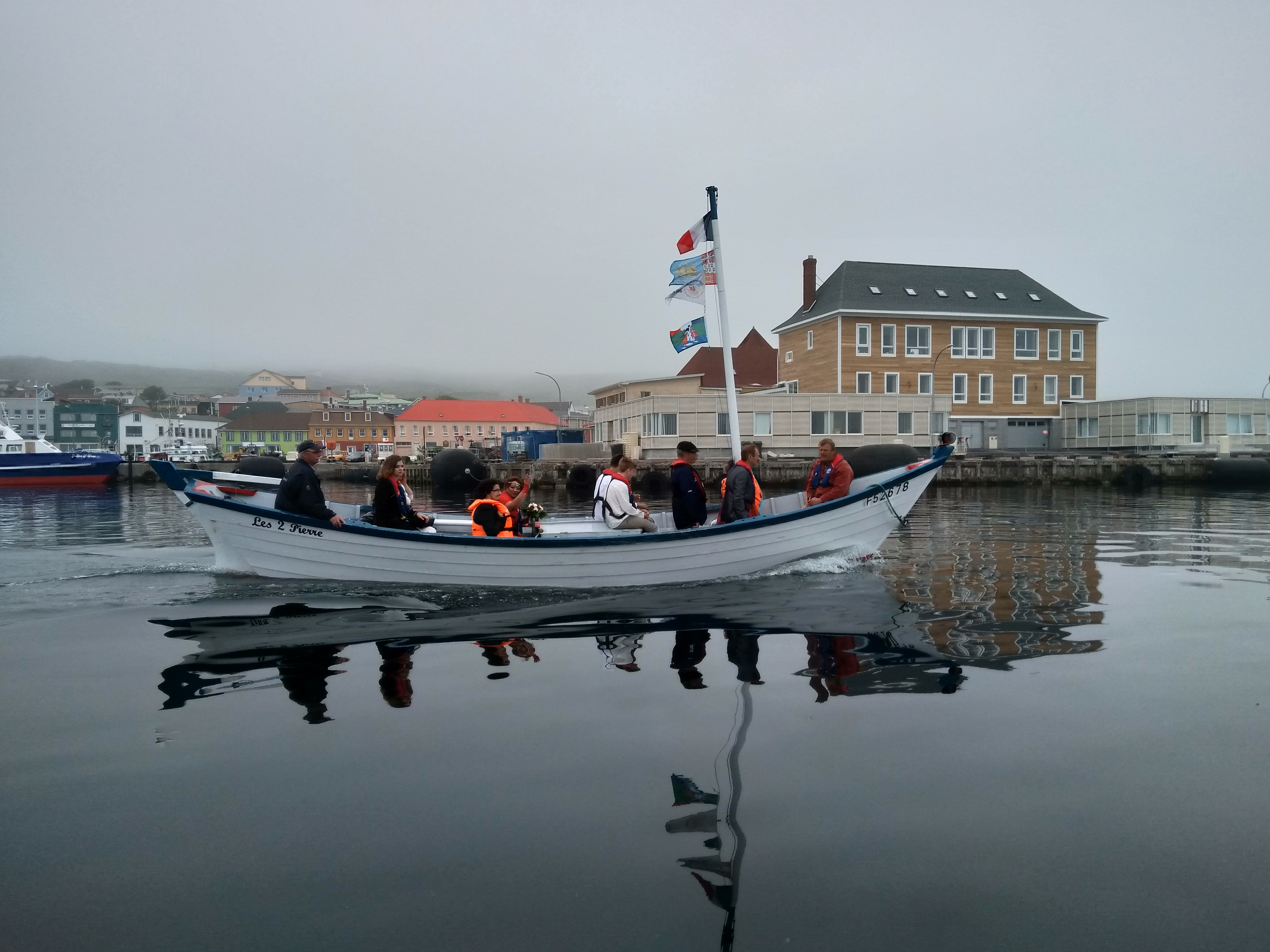
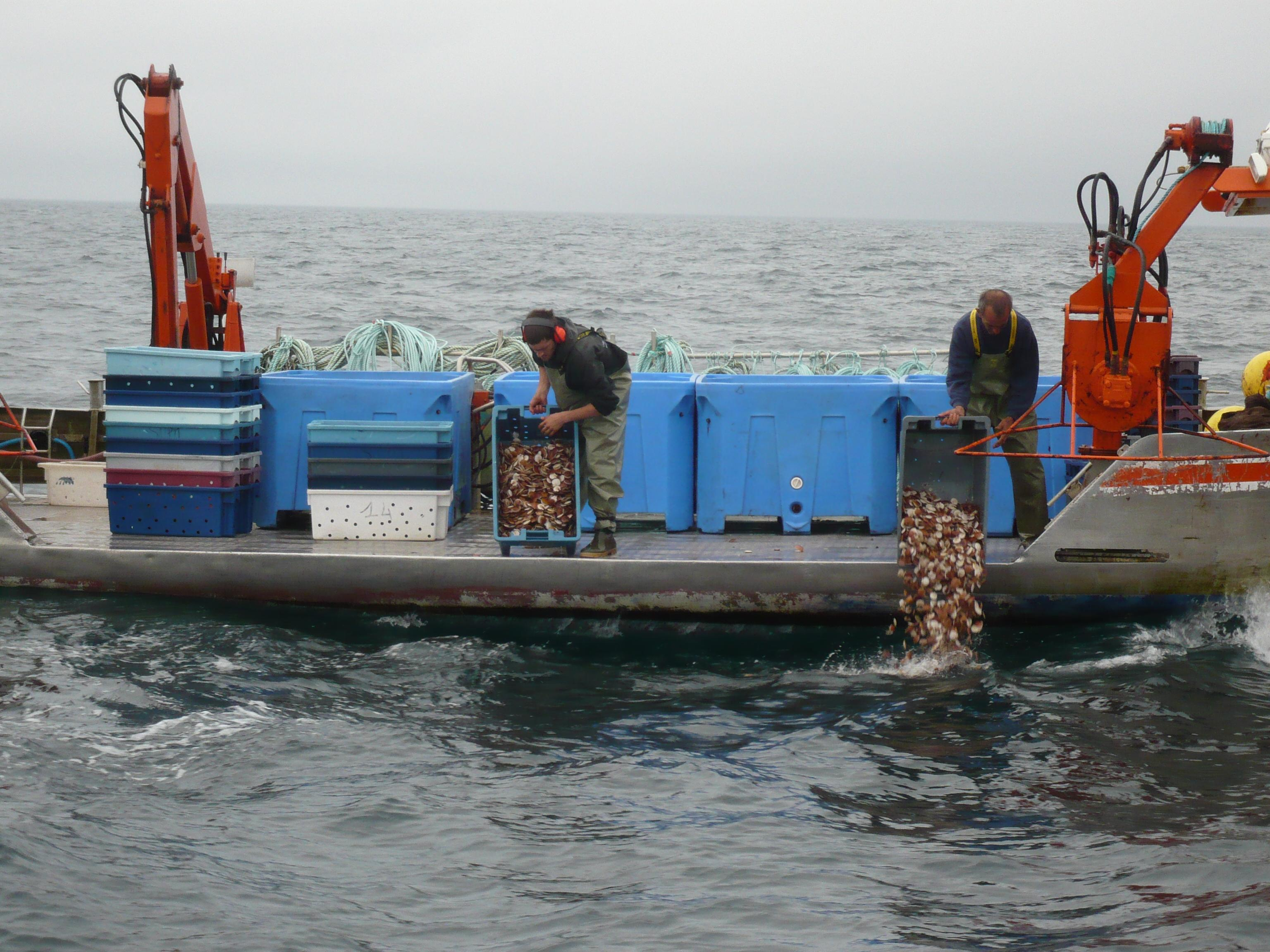
- From left to right: a traditional Basque festival in Saint-Pierre, young Saint Pierrais in football uniforms, Saint Pierrais and tourists in dories, fishermen in St. Pierre.

Total population
- 5,819

Regions with significant populations
- Saint-Pierre and Miquelon-Langlade

Languages
- Metropolitan French, Saint Pierre and Miquelon French

Religion
- Mainly Catholicism

Related ethnic groups
- French people, Normans, Bretons, Basques, Brayons

The Saint-Pierrais and the Miquelonnais are the inhabitants of the French semi-autonomous archipelago of Saint Pierre and Miquelon, located off the coast of Newfoundland, Canada, of European ethnic origin. Predominantly French-speaking, they are mainly descended from Norman, Breton, and Basque settlers, with additional English and Irish ancestry resulting from historical migrations and intermarriage with Newfoundlanders. As of 2022, the population of the territory is estimated at around 5,819, with the vast majority residing on the island of Saint-Pierre and a smaller community on Miquelon-Langlade.

Another European demographic group within the population of Saint Pierre and Miquelon are expatriates from Metropolitan France who have recently arrived or are living temporarily in Saint Pierre and Miquelon as civil servants and contract workers for the French government. The Saint Pierrais emphasise their distinct identity and position as permanent locals who have lived in Saint Pierre and Miquelon for several generations by referring to temporary French expatriates as Mailloux in local slang, or métros (short for métropolitains). According to the Quebec government's Centre de la francophonie des Amériques, Saint-Pierrais and Miquelonnais are a French-speaking society that is ‘culturally distinct from France’.

== Origins of the Saint Pierre and Miquelon people ==
From the 15th century onwards, European fishermen of various nationalities set off to exploit the Grand Banks of Newfoundland. Among them were many Bretons from Paimpol and Saint-Malo, as well as Normans from Barfleur and Dieppe, not to mention a large number of Basques.

On Saint Pierre Island, a population of residents gradually took root when fishing crews began wintering there to maintain the facilities used for migratory fishing. The first reference to these settlers appears in a document from 1670, where it is noted that the Intendant of New France made a stopover there and counted thirteen fishermen and four sedentary inhabitants. Three families were counted there in 1687, a chapel was built there in 1689, and a small military post was established there in 1690. By this time, Saint Pierre had become the main supply and service centre for the south coast of the Burin Peninsula and, to the west, as far as the bays of Espoir, Fortune and Hermitage, where a small number of French fishermen had settled and described in French documents as ‘bayes dépendantes’ of Saint Pierre.

At the same time, a vast concession was established around Placentia. The French influence grew until 1655, occupying half of the coastline mainly to the south of the island of Newfoundland, including Saint Pierre and Miquelon. The archipelago then became an integral part of the French colony of Newfoundland (Terre-Neuve). In 1713, the Treaty of Utrecht was signed, and France lost the island of Newfoundland, its Placentia concession and Saint Pierre and Miquelon.

In 1763, following the Treaty of Paris, France ceded all its possessions in North America to the British. However, it retained fishing rights on the French Shore of Newfoundland and regained Saint-Pierre and Miquelon. It re-established French and Acadian settlers on the island.

As France joined the United States in the Revolutionary War, the archipelago was once again taken back by the British in 1778. Nearly 2,000 Saint Pierrais and Miquelonnais were deported to France, including refugees from the Acadian deportation of 1755. All the colonial settlements were destroyed.

However, the archipelago was returned to France under the Treaty of Versailles in 1783. During the French Revolution, however, the Miquelonnais lost their Acadian community, who suddenly left the island, while the republican exercise in Saint-Pierre came to an abrupt end during the new British attack in 1793. They took refuge in the Magdalen Islands, which were then attached to the British province of Quebec, where French civil laws still applied.

In 1802, France regained possession of Saint Pierre and Miquelon following the Peace of Amiens, allowing its population to resettle there. This was to be short-lived, however, as the British took back the island until Napoleon's first abdication in 1814.

The Treaty of Paris returned the islands to France before they were once again occupied by the British with Napoleon's return during the Hundred Days. The British occupation of the archipelago ended definitively in 1815. When Saint Pierrais and Miquelonnais returned, they discovered uninhabited islands, with destroyed or dilapidated structures and buildings.

The Saint Pierrais, Miquelonnais and Acadians were regularly evicted over the years, but remained attached to their land. Even today, surnames of Acadian (Bourgeois, Coste, Poirier, Vigneau, etc.), Basque (Detcheverry, Apesteguy, Arozamena, etc.), Norman or Breton (Briand, Landry, Dagort, etc.) origin can still be found among the population of Saint Pierre and Miquelon.

== Notable Saint Pierre and Miquelon Islanders ==
=== Politics ===
- Annick Girardin, politician, who served as Minister of the Sea and Minister of Overseas France
- George Alain Frecker, politician
- Bernard Briand, politician, president of the Territorial Council
- Henry Hughes Hough, Rear Admiral
- Karine Claireaux, politician
- Albert Briand, politician
- Stéphane Lenormand, politician
- Catherine Hélène, politician
- Sandy Skinner, politician

=== Engineers ===
- Sybil Derrible, engineer and author

=== Culture ===
- Françoise Enguehard, author
- Eugène Nicole, writer
- Paula Nenette Pepin, composer and pianist
- Alexandra Hernandez, singer
- Julien Kang, actor and model

=== Sports ===
- Nicolas Arrossamena, ice hockey player
- Valentin Claireaux, ice hockey player

== See also ==
=== Related articles ===
- Bretons
- Basques
- Normans
- French Canadians
- Québécois people
- Franco-Newfoundlanders
- Pied-noir
- Zoreilles
- Béké

=== External links ===
- Saint-Pierre-et-Miquelon on the site of the Centre de la francophonie des Amériques of the Quebec government
