= List of elections in 2017 =

== Africa ==
- 2017 Somali presidential election 8 February 2017
- 2017 Liberian by-election 28 February 2017
- 2017 Gambian parliamentary election 6 April 2017
- 2017 Algerian legislative election 4 May 2017
- 2017 Lesotho general election 3 June 2017
- 2017 Republic of the Congo parliamentary election 16 and 30 July 2017
- 2017 Saint Helena general election 26 July 2017
- 2017 Senegalese parliamentary election 30 July 2017
- 2017 Rwandan presidential election 4 August 2017
- 2017 Kenyan general election 8 August 2017
- 2017 Angolan legislative election 23 August 2017
- 2017 Liberian general election 10 October and 26 December 2017
- 2017 Kenyan presidential election 26 October 2017
- 2017 Equatorial Guinean legislative election 12 November 2017
- 2017 Somaliland presidential election 13 November 2017

== Asia ==
- Japan:
  - 2017 Yamagata gubernatorial election 22 January 2017
  - 2017 Gifu gubernatorial election 29 January 2017
  - 2017 Chiba gubernatorial election 23 March 2017
  - 2017 Akita gubernatorial election 9 April 2017
  - 2017 Shizuoka gubernatorial election 25 June 2017
  - 2017 Shizuoka Prefectural Assembly by-elections 25 June 2017
  - 2017 Hyōgo prefectural gubernatorial election 2 July 2017
  - 2017 Tatsuno and Ibo District by-election 2 July 2017
  - 2017 Tokyo prefectural election 2 July 2017
  - 2017 Ibaraki gubernatorial election 27 August 2017
  - 2017 Japanese general election 22 October 2017
  - 2017 Miyagi gubernatorial election 22 October 2017
  - 2017 Hiroshima gubernatorial election 12 November 2017
- India:
  - 2017 Goa Legislative Assembly election 4 February 2017
  - 2017 Punjab Legislative Assembly election 4 February 2017
  - 2017 Uttar Pradesh Legislative Assembly election 11 February 2017 – 8 March 2017
  - 2017 Uttarakhand Legislative Assembly election 15 February 2017
  - 2017 Manipur Legislative Assembly election 4 and 8 March 2017
  - 2017 Indian presidential election 17 July 2017
  - 2017 Indian vice presidential election 5 August 2017
  - 2017 Himachal Pradesh Legislative Assembly election 9 November 2017
  - 2017 Gujarat Legislative Assembly election 9 and 14 December 2017
- 2017 Abkhazian parliamentary election 12 March 2017 and 26 March 2017
- 2017 Turkmen presidential election 12 February 2017
- 2017 Indonesian local elections 15 February 2017
  - 2017 Jakarta gubernatorial election 15 February and 19 April 2017
- Malaysia: 2017 Tanjong Datu by-election 18 February 2017
- 2017 East Timorese presidential election 20 March 2017
- 2017 Hong Kong Chief Executive election 26 March 2017
- 2017 Myanmar by-elections 1 April 2017
- 2017 South Korean presidential election 9 May 2017
- 2017 Nepalese local elections 14 May, 28 June and 18 September 2017
- 2017 Cambodian communal elections 4 June 2017
- 2017 Mongolian presidential election 26 June and 7 July 2017
- 2017 East Timorese parliamentary election 22 July 2017
- 2017 Jordanian local elections 15 August 2017
- 2017 Macanese legislative election 17 September 2017
- ~~2017 Singaporean presidential election~~ 23 September 2017 (sole candidate acclaimed as President-elect)
- China: 13th National People's Congress October 2017
- 2017 Kyrgyz presidential election 15 October 2017
- 2017 Nepalese legislative election 26 November and 7 December 2017

=== Middle East ===
- 2017 Iranian local elections 19 May 2017
- 2017 Iranian presidential election 19 May 2017

== Europe ==
- 2017 Liechtenstein general election 5 February 2017
- 2017 German presidential election 12 February 2017
- United Kingdom: 2017 Copeland by-election 23 February 2017
- United Kingdom: 2017 Stoke-on-Trent Central by-election 23 February 2017
- United Kingdom: 2017 Northern Ireland Assembly election 2 March 2017
- 2017 Abkhazian parliamentary election 12 and 26 March 2017
- 2017 Hungarian presidential election 13 March 2017
- 2017 Dutch general election 15 March 2017
- 2017 Bulgarian parliamentary election 26 March 2017
- Germany: 2017 Saarland state election 26 March 2017
- 2017 Armenian parliamentary election 2 April 2017
- 2017 Serbian presidential election 2 April 2017
- 2017 Finnish municipal elections 9 April 2017
- 2017 South Ossetian presidential election 9 April 2017
- 2017 Albanian presidential election 19, 20, 27 and 28 April 2017
- 2017 French presidential election 23 April and 7 May 2017
- 2017 United Kingdom local elections 4 May 2017
- 2017 Montenegrin municipal elections 12 March-7 May and 26 November 2017
- United Kingdom: ~~2017 Manchester Gorton by-election~~ 4 May 2017 (cancelled)
- Germany: 2017 Schleswig-Holstein state election 7 May 2017
- Germany: 2017 North Rhine-Westphalia state election 14 May 2017
- 2017 Croatian local elections 28 May and 4 June 2017
- 2017 Maltese general election 3 June 2017
- 2017 Latvian municipal elections 4 June 2017
- 2017 United Kingdom general election 8 June 2017
- 2017 French legislative election 11 and 18 June 2017
- 2017 Italian local elections 11 and 25 June 2017
- 2017 Kosovan parliamentary election 11 June 2017
- 2017 Albanian parliamentary election 25 June 2017
- 2017 Russian gubernatorial elections 10 September 2017
- 2017 Russian regional elections 10 September 2017
- Russia: 2017 Bryansk by-election 10 September 2017
- Russia: 2017 Kingisepp by-election 10 September 2017
- 2017 Norwegian parliamentary election 11 September 2017
- 2017 French Senate election 24 September 2017
- 2017 German federal election 24 September 2017
- 2017 Portuguese local elections 1 October 2017
- 2017 Luxembourg communal elections 8 October 2017
- 2017 Austrian legislative election 15 October 2017
- 2017 Estonian municipal elections 15 October 2017
- Germany: 2017 Lower Saxony state election 15 October 2017
- 2017 Macedonian local elections 15 and 29 October 2017
- 2017 Czech legislative election 20–21 October 2017
- 2017 Georgian local elections 21 October 2017
- 2017 Kosovan local elections 22 October and 18 November 2017
- 2017 Serbian local elections 2017
- 2017 Slovenian presidential election 22 October and 12 November 2017
- 2017 Icelandic parliamentary election 28 October 2017
- 2017 Slovak regional elections 4 November 2017
- Italy: 2017 Sicilian regional election 5 November 2017
- 2017 Danish local elections 21 November 2017
- France: 2017 Corsican territorial election 3 and 10 December 2017
- Spain: 2017 Catalan regional election 21 December 2017

== North America ==
- 2017 United States elections
- France: 2017 Saint Pierre and Miquelon legislative election 19 March 2017
- Canada: Calgary Heritage by-election, 2017 3 April 2017
- Canada: Calgary Midnapore by-election, 2017 3 April 2017
- Canada: Markham—Thornhill by-election, 2017 3 April 2017
- Canada: Ottawa—Vanier by-election, 2017 3 April 2017
- Canada: Saint-Laurent by-election, 2017 3 April 2017
- Canada: 2017 British Columbia general election 9 May 2017
- Canada: 2017 Nova Scotia general election 30 May 2017
- 2017 Mexican gubernatorial elections 4 June 2017
- 2017 Bermudian general election 18 July 2017
- 2017 Honduran general election 26 November 2017

=== Caribbean ===
- 2016–17 Haitian Senate election 20 November 2016 and 29 January 2017
- France: 2017 Saint Barthélemy Territorial Council election 19 March 2017
- France: 2017 Saint Martin Territorial Council election 19 March 2017
- Netherlands: 2017 Curaçao general election 28 April 2017
- 2017 Bahamian general election 10 May 2017
- 2017 Caymanian general election 24 May 2017

== Oceania ==
- 2017 Marshallese Constitutional Convention election 21 February 2017
- New Zealand: 2017 Mount Albert by-election 25 February 2017
- 2017 Micronesian parliamentary election 7 March 2017
- Australia: 2017 Western Australian state election 11 March 2017
- France: 2017 Wallis and Futuna Territorial Assembly election 26 March 2017
- Australia: 2017 Gosford state by-election 8 April 2017
- Australia: 2017 Manly state by-election 8 April 2017
- Australia: 2017 North Shore state by-election 8 April 2017
- Australia: 2017 Tasmanian Legislative Council periodic elections 6 May 2017
- 2017 Niuean general election 6 May 2017
- 2017 Papua New Guinean general election 24 June–8 July 2017
- 2017 Vanuatuan presidential elections 3 July 2017
- 2017 New Zealand general election 23 September 2017
- Australia: 2017 Blacktown state by-election 14 October 2017
- Australia: 2017 Cootamundra state by-election 14 October 2017
- Australia: 2017 Murray state by-election 14 October 2017
- Australia: 2017 Pembroke state by-election 4 November 2017
- 2017 Tongan general election 16 November 2017
- Australia: 2017 Northcote state by-election 18 November 2017
- Australia: 2017 Queensland state election 25 November 2017
- Australia: 2017 New England by-election 2 December 2017
- Australia: 2017 Bennelong by-election 16 December 2017

== South America ==
- 2017 Argentine provincial elections
- 2017 Ecuadorian general election 19 February and 2 April 2017
- 2017 Venezuelan Constituent Assembly election 30 July 2017
- Brazil: 2017 Amazonas gubernatorial election 6 and 27 August 2017
- 2017 Venezuelan regional elections 15 October 2017
- 2017 Argentine legislative election 22 October 2017
- 2017 Falkland Islands general election 9 November 2017
- 2017 Chilean general election 19 November and 17 December 2017
- 2017 Venezuelan municipal elections 10 December 2017

== See also ==
- Local electoral calendar 2017
- National electoral calendar 2017
- Supranational electoral calendar 2017
