= List of senators of Saint Pierre and Miquelon =

Location of Saint-Pierre-et-Miquelon in France

Following is a list of senators of Saint Pierre and Miquelon, people who have represented the collectivity of Saint Pierre and Miquelon in the Senate of France.

== Fifth Republic ==
Senators for Saint-Pierre-et-Miquelon under the French Fifth Republic have been:

In office		Name
21 January 1947	1 October 1968	Henri Claireaux
2 October 1968	21 June 1981	Albert Pen
20 September 1981	30 September 1986	Marc Plantegenest
1 October 1986	30 September 1995	Albert Pen
1 October 1995	30 September 2004	Victor Reux
1 October 2004	30 September 2011	Denis Detcheverry
1 October 2011	1 October 2017	Karine Claireaux
2 October 2017	1 October 2023	Stéphane Artano
2 October 2023	13 September 2024	Annick Girardin
9 December 2024	10 July 2025	Jean-Marc Ruel
15 September 2025	Incumbent	Annick Girardin

== Sources ==
- Liste des anciens sénateurs de la Vème République par circonscription (in French), Sénat de France
- Liste par département – Saint-Pierre-et-Miquelon (in French), Sénat de France
