= Politics of Saint Pierre and Miquelon =

Politics of Saint Pierre and Miquelon Politique à Saint-Pierre-et-Miquelon
- Seal of Saint Pierre and Miquelon
- Polity type: Devolved parliamentary local authority within French Republic
- Formation: October 27, 1946; 79 years ago

Legislative branch
- Name: Territorial Council
- Type: Unicameral
- Meeting place: Office of the Territory

Executive branch
- Head of state
- Title: Prefect
- Currently: Bruno André
- Appointer: President of the Republic, Emmanuel Macron
- Head of government
- Title: President of the Collectivité
- Currently: Bernard Briand
- Appointer: Direct popular vote (two rounds if necessary)
- Cabinet
- Name: Executive Council
- Current cabinet: Presidency of Bernard Briand
- Leader: Prime Minister
- Appointer: President of the Republic
- Headquarters: Office of the Territory
- Ministries: 8

Judicial branch
- Name: Judiciary of Saint Pierre and Miquelon

The politics of Saint Pierre and Miquelon take place in the framework of a parliamentary representative democratic French overseas collectivity, whereby the President of the Territorial Council is the head of government, and of a multi-party system. Executive power is exercised by the government, the « Conseil exécutif ».

Saint-Pierre and Miquelon has considerable fiscal and customs autonomy and exercises powers in areas normally reserved for the French central government (marine resources, ships, international agreements in some cases). However, it also has no powers over certain sectors normally devolved to local authorities (secondary education, national roads, civil security, etc.), which remain the responsibility of the central government.

== Government ==
=== Executive power ===
Saint Pierre and Miquelon has a two-headed executive: the Prefect (representative of the President of France and the French government) and the President of the Collectivité (head of the local executive).

The head of state is the President of France, currently Emmanuel Macron. The President is represented in the Collectivité by the Prefect of Saint Pierre & Miquelon (French: Préfet), a position held by Bruno André as of 2025. The role of the prefect is equivalent to that of a governor or governor general in English-speaking territories.

The head of government is the President of the Collectivité, currently Bernard Briand. He heads the executive of the Collectivité and manages local affairs falling within the scope of the archipelago's autonomy (local taxation, customs, natural resources, ship registration, etc.). The Collectivité therefore has its own executive, distinct from the State services represented by the Prefect. The local government sits at the Territorial Office (Hôtel du Territoire).

The executive is made up of a government, known as the "Conseil exécutif" (in English: the "Executive Council"), and six members known as vice-presidents, including the President. Like a minister, each member of the cabinet has a delegation.

==== Current executive office holders ====
Main office-holders
Office	Name	Party	Since
President of France	Emmanuel Macron	Renaissance	14 May 2017
Prefect	Bruno André		21 August 2023

==== Current cabinet (Conseil exécutif) ====
Portfolio	Member	Took office	Left office	Party
President of the Collectivity	Bernard Briand	1 April 2022	Incumbent	AD
1st Vice-President for Attractiveness	Yannick Abraham	1 April 2022	Incumbent	AD
2nd Vice-President for Solidarity	Jacqueline André	1 April 2022	Incumbent	AD
3rd Vice-President	Yannis Coste	1 April 2022	Incumbent	AD
4th Vice-President for the Environment	Claude Lemoine	1 April 2022	Incumbent	AD
5th Vice-President for Youth Affairs	Naomi Haran	1 April 2022	Incumbent	AD

=== Legislative power ===
The Territorial Council of Saint-Pierre and Miquelon (French: Conseil territorial de Saint-Pierre-et-Miquelon), which was known until February 22, 2007, as the General Council (Conseil général), has 19 members, elected for a three-year term in single seat constituencies. The council sits at the Territorial Office (Hôtel du Territoire), a two-storey, two tone aqua colour building on St. Pierre.

=== Judicial power ===
The judiciary of the territory consists of the Superior Tribunal of Appeals (Tribunal Supérieur d'Appel).

The court resides at the Palais de Justice or Courthouse and are located at Church Square in St. Pierre.

== Municipal Governments ==
There are two communes: Miquelon-Langlade and Saint-Pierre.

For more, see: Municipal governments in St. Pierre and Miquelon

== Departments (État and Collectivité) ==
Saint Pierre and Miquelon has several departments, some of which are the exclusive responsibility of the French Government (l'État), others of the Collectivité. Some departments are joint services of the French Government (l'État) and the Collectivité.

=== Under the authority of the Collectivité ===
- Environment and Quality of Life: under the authority of the Collectivité;
  - Agriculture, Rural and Natural Areas Unit, or CAERN;
  - Territorial Veterinary Clinic;
- Territorial Development: under the authority of the Collectivité;
- Economy, Taxation and Innovation;
  - Tax Department, or DSF (Direction des Services Fiscaux): under the authority of the Collectivité;
- Transport and Mobility: under the authority of the Collectivité;
  - SPM Ferries;
- Youth and Solidarity: under the authority of the Collectivité;
  - Territorial Centre for the Disabled, or MTA;
  - Solidarity initiatives, Children and Families;

=== Under mixed authority ===
- Territories, Food and Sea Department, or DTAM: under the authority of the Préfet, made available to the Collectivité;
  - Maritime Affairs;
  - Energy, Risks, Planning and Foresight;
  - Agriculture, Food, Water and Biodiversity (formerly Direction de l'Agriculture et de la Foret);
  - Roads, Constructions and Buildings (formerly Direction de l'Equipement);
- Public Finance Department, under the authority of the Préfet, but it collects tax on behalf of the communes and the Collectivité;
- Customs Department: under the authority of the Préfet and local code voted by the Collectivité;

=== Under the authority of the Préfet (French Government representative) ===
- Social cohesion, Labour, Employment and Population Department, or DCSTEP: under the authority of the Préfet;
  - Social cohesion, Youth, Sport and Community life (formerly Direction Territoriale de la Jeunesse et des Sports, DTJS and Direction des Affaires Sanitaires et Sociales, DASS);
  - Competition, Consumer affairs and Fraud control (formerly Direction de la Concurrence, de la Consommation et de la Répression des Fraudes, DCCRF);
  - Business, Economy and Employment;
- Territorial Health Administration, or ATS: under the authority of the Préfet (formerly Direction des Affaires Sanitaires et Sociales, DASS) local unit of the French Ministry of Health;
- National Education Service, or SEN: under the authority of the Préfet, local unit of the French Ministry of National Education;
- Command of the Gendarmerie Nationale: under the authority of the Préfet, local unit of the French Ministry of the Armed Forces;
- French Navy Unit - Fulmar patrol vessel, local unit of the French Navy;
- Civil Aviation Service, local branch of the Directorate General for Civil Aviation (DGAC);
- Border Control Police, a specialised service and local unit of the French National Police.

== Boundary dispute ==
The boundaries of the 1992 EEZ resolution between Canada and France

In 1992, a maritime boundary dispute with Canada over the delineation of the Exclusive Economic Zone belonging to France was settled by the International Court of Arbitration. In the decision, France kept the 12 nautical mile (NM) (22.2 km) territorial sea surrounding the islands and was given an additional 12 NM (22.2 km) contiguous zone as well as a 10.5 NM (19.4 km) wide corridor stretching 200 NM (370 km) south. The total area in the award was 18% of what France had requested.

The boundary dispute had been a flash point for Franco-Canadian relations. New claims made under UNCLOS by France over the continental shelf might cause new tensions between France and Canada.

== International organization participation ==
Franc Zone, World Federation of Trade Unions
