= 2017 national electoral calendar =

National and federal elections held in 2017

- Countries with national elections or referendums: Executive Legislative Executive and Legislative Referendum Executive and Referendum Legislative and Referendum Executive, Legislative and Referendum Judicial Legislative and Judicial Constitutional Assembly Constitutional Assembly and Referendum

This national electoral calendar for 2017 lists the national/federal elections held in 2017 in all sovereign states and their dependent territories. By-elections are excluded, though national referendums are included.

== January ==
- 5 November – 17 January: Somalia, House of the People
- 23–31 January: Tokelau, Legislature
- 29 January: Haiti, Chamber of Deputies (1/119 seats 2nd round) and Senate (8/30 seats 2nd round)

== February ==
- 5 February: Liechtenstein, Parliament
- 12 February:
  - Switzerland, Referendums
  - Turkmenistan, President
- 19 February: Ecuador, President (1st round), Parliament and Referendum
- 20 February: Nagorno-Karabakh, Constitutional Referendum
- 21 February: Marshall Islands, Constitutional Convention

== March ==
- 7 March: Federated States of Micronesia, Parliament and Referendum
- 12 March: Abkhazia, Parliament (1st round)
- 15 March: Netherlands, House of Representatives
- 19 March:
  - Saint Barthélemy, Legislature
  - Saint Martin, Legislature (1st round)
  - Saint Pierre and Miquelon, Legislature
- 20 March: East Timor, President
- 26 March:
  - Abkhazia, Parliament (2nd round)
  - Bulgaria, Parliament
  - Saint Martin, Legislature (2nd round)
  - Wallis and Futuna, Legislature

== April ==
- 2 April:
  - Armenia, Parliament
  - Ecuador, President (2nd round)
  - Serbia, President
- 6 April: The Gambia, Parliament
- 9 April: South Ossetia, President and Referendum
- 16 April: Turkey, Constitutional Referendum
- 23 April: France, President (1st round)
- 28 April: Curaçao, Legislature

== May ==
- 4 May: Algeria, National Assembly
- 6 May: Niue, Legislature
- 7 May: France, President (2nd round)
- 9 May: South Korea, President
- 10 May: The Bahamas, House of Assembly
- 19 May: Iran, President
- 21 May: Switzerland, Referendum
- 24 May: Cayman Islands, Legislature

== June ==
- 3 June:
  - Lesotho, National Assembly
  - Malta, Parliament
- 8 June: United Kingdom, House of Commons
- 11 June:
  - France, National Assembly (1st round)
  - Kosovo, Parliament
  - Puerto Rico, Referendum
- 18 June: France, National Assembly (2nd round)
- 24 June – 8 July: Papua New Guinea, Parliament
- 25 June: Albania, Parliament
- 26 June: Mongolia, President (1st round)

== July ==
- 7 July: Mongolia, President (2nd round)
- 16 July:
  - Republic of the Congo, National Assembly (1st round)
  - Venezuela, Referendum
- 18 July: Bermuda, House of Assembly
- 22 July: East Timor, Parliament
- 30 July:
  - Republic of the Congo, National Assembly (2nd round)
  - Senegal, Parliament
  - Venezuela, Constituent Assembly

== August ==
- 4 August: Rwanda, President
  - Mauritania, Constitutional Referendum
- 8 August: Kenya, ~~President~~ (election nullified), National Assembly and Senate
- 23 August: Angola, Parliament (1st phase)
- 26 August: Angola, Parliament (2nd phase)

== September ==
- 11 September: Norway, Parliament
- 12 September – 7 November: Australia, Referendum
- 17 September: Macau, Legislature
- 22 September: Aruba, Legislature
- 23 September: New Zealand, Parliament
- 24 September:
  - Germany, Bundestag
  - Slovenia, Referendum
  - Switzerland, Referendums

== October ==
- 10 October: Liberia, President (1st round) and House of Representatives
- 15 October:
  - Austria, National Council
  - Kyrgyzstan, President
- 20–21 October: Czech Republic, Chamber of Deputies
- 22 October:
  - Argentina, Chamber of Deputies and Senate
  - Japan, House of Representatives and Supreme Court retention elections
  - Slovenia, President (1st round)
- 26 October: Kenya, President (re-vote)
- 28 October: Iceland, Parliament

== November ==
- 8 November: Pitcairn Islands, Deputy Mayor and Legislature
- 9 November: Falkland Islands, Legislature
- 12 November:
  - Equatorial Guinea, Chamber of Deputies and Senate
  - Slovenia, President (2nd round)
- 13 November: Somaliland, President
- 16 November: Tonga, Parliament
- 19 November: Chile, President (1st round), Chamber of Deputies and Senate
- 26 November:
  - Honduras, President and Parliament
  - Nepal, House of Representatives (1st phase)

== December ==
- 3 December: Bolivia, Judiciary
- 7 December: Nepal, House of Representatives (2nd phase)
- 17 December: Chile, President (2nd round)
- 26 December: Liberia, President (2nd round)

== Indirect elections ==
The following indirect elections of heads of state and the upper houses of bicameral legislatures took place through votes in elected lower houses, unicameral legislatures, or electoral colleges:

- 8 February: Somalia, President
- 12 February: Germany, President
- 13 March: Hungary, President
- 26 March: Hong Kong, Chief Executive
- 1 April: San Marino, Captains Regent
- 19, 20, 27 and 28 April: Albania, President
- 21 April, 14 May, 11 July, 15 August, 9 and 29 November: Malaysia, Senate
- 28 June: Kazakhstan, Senate
- 3–6 July: Vanuatu, President
- 5 July: Samoa, Head of State
- 17 July: India, President
- 19 July: Artsakh, President
- 21 July and 8 August: India, Council of States
- 31 July: Republic of the Congo, Senate
- 5 August:
  - India, Vice President
- 24 September: France, Senate
- 1 October: San Marino, Captains Regent
- 22–23 November: Slovenia, National Council

== See also ==
- 2017 in politics
