= Presidency of Bernard Briand =

11th Council of Ministers of Sint Maarten

Briand cabinet
- 14th Cabinet of Saint Pierre and Miquelon
- Date formed: 1 April 2022

People and organisations
- Head of state: Emmanuel Macron (President of France); Bruno André (Prefect)
- Head of government: Bernard Briand
- Member parties: Archipelago Tomorrow

History
- Election: 27 March 2022
- Predecessor: Lenormand I

The Briand cabinet is the 14th Executive Council of the Territorial Collectivity of Saint Pierre and Miquelon headed by President Bernard Briand. It was installed by the Territorial Council on 1 April 2022.

Formation of the cabinet began after the legislative election held on 27 March 2022. The cabinet is formed by Archipelago Tomorrow Party.

== List of cabinet members ==
The cabinet is composed as follows:

Archipelago Tomorrow (AD)

Cabinet members
Portfolio	Minister	Took office	Left office	Party	Remarks
President of the Collectivity	Bernard Briand	1 April 2022	Incumbent	AD	
1st Vice-President	Yannick Abraham	1 April 2022	Incumbent	AD	
2nd Vice-President	Jacqueline André-Cormier	1 April 2022	Incumbent	AD	
3rd Vice-President	Yannis Coste	1 April 2022	Incumbent	AD	
4th Vice-President	Claude Lemoine	1 April 2022	Incumbent	AD	
5th Vice-President	Naomi Haran	1 April 2022	Incumbent	AD	
Executive Council Member	Jean-Louis Dagort	1 April 2022	Incumbent	AD	
Executive Council Member	Arnaud Orsiny	1 April 2022	Incumbent	AD	
