= Stéphane Artano =

French politician

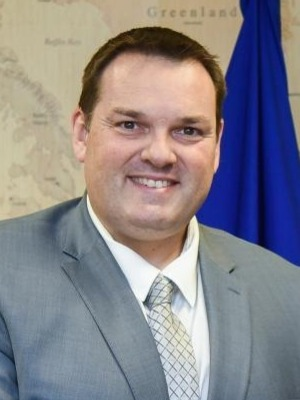
- Artano in 2016

Member of the French Senate for Saint Pierre and Miquelon
- In office 2 October 2017 – 2 October 2023
- Preceded by: Karine Claireaux
- Succeeded by: Annick Girardin

President of the Territorial Council of Saint Pierre and Miquelon
- In office 31 March 2006 – 24 October 2017
- Preceded by: Charles Dodeman
- Succeeded by: Stéphane Lenormand

Personal details
- Born: 9 March 1973 (age 53)
- Party: Archipelago Tomorrow

Stéphane Artano (French pronunciation: [stefan aʁtano]; born 9 March 1973) is a French politician who served as Senator for Saint Pierre and Miquelon from 2017 to 2023.

== Career ==
A member of Archipelago Tomorrow, Artano was elected to the president of the Territorial Council of Saint Pierre and Miquelon on 24 March 2006. He was reelected in March 2012 against Annick Girardin, who has been serving as Minister of Overseas France since 2017. He was reelected for a third mandate in this position in March 2017. On 24 September 2017, Artano was elected as the Senator for Saint Pierre and Miquelon, defeating incumbent Karine Claireaux. He took office the following 2 October and served a six-year term.

== See also ==
- List of senators of Saint Pierre and Miquelon
