= Sandy Skinner =

Saint-Pierrais politician (born 2 November 1988)

Member of the Territorial Council of Saint Pierre and Miquelon
- Incumbent
- Assumed office 19 March 2017
- Constituency: Saint-Pierre

Personal details
- Born: 1988 or 1989 (age 37–38)
- Party: Archipelago Tomorrow
- Children: 2

Sandy Georgette Skinner (born 2 November 1988) is a Saint-Pierrais politician and hospital administrative officer who has served on the Territorial Council of Saint Pierre and Miquelon since 2017. A member of the Archipelago Tomorrow party, she represents the municipality of Saint-Pierre.

== Biography ==
Sandy Georgette Skinner was born in 1988, and lives in Saint Pierre and Miquelon, a self-governing overseas collectivity of France. She works as an administrative officer at the François Dunan Hospital Centre. In the 2017 Saint Pierre and Miquelon legislative election, Skinner was elected to the Territorial Council, representing Saint-Pierre as a member of the Archipelago Tomorrow party. She was re-elected in the 2022 election.

During her tenure in the council, Skinner has served on the committees on housing, tourism, and education. As of 2022, she is also the designated substitute member for Stéphane Lenormand in the National Assembly of France.
