= 2012 national electoral calendar =

National and federal elections held in 2012

- Countries with national elections or referendums: Executive Legislative Executive and Legislative Referendum Executive and Referendum Legislative and Referendum Executive, Legislative and Referendum Legislative and Judicial Legislative, Judicial and Referendum Executive, Legislative, Judicial and Referendum

This national electoral calendar for 2012 lists the national/federal elections held in 2012 in all sovereign states and their dependent territories. By-elections are excluded, though national referendums are included.

== January ==
- 3–4 January: Egypt, People's Assembly (3rd phase 1st round)
- 10–11 January: Egypt, People's Assembly (3rd phase 2nd round)
- 13 January: Kiribati, President
- 14 January: Taiwan, President and Parliament
- 15 January: Kazakhstan, Assembly
- 22 January:
  - Croatia, EU Referendum
  - Finland, President (1st round)
- 29–30 January: Egypt, Consultative Council (1st phase 1st round)

== February ==
- 2 February: Kuwait, ~~Parliament~~ (election nullified)
- 5 February: Finland, President (2nd round)
- 5–6 February: Egypt, Consultative Council (1st phase 2nd round)
- 12 February: Turkmenistan, President
- 14–15 February: Egypt, Consultative Council (2nd phase 1st round)
- 18 February: Latvia, Constitutional Referendum
- 19–21 February: Sahrawi Arab Democratic Republic, Parliament
- 21 February: Yemen, President
- 21–22 February: Egypt, Consultative Council (2nd phase 2nd round)
- 26 February:
  - Senegal, President (1st round)
  - Syria, Constitutional Referendum

== March ==
- 2 March: Iran, Parliament (1st round)
- 4 March: Russia, President
- 7 March: Belize, House of Representatives
- 10 March:
  - Abkhazia, Parliament (1st round)
  - Slovakia, Parliament
- 11 March:
  - El Salvador, Parliament
  - Switzerland, Referendums
- 17 March: East Timor, President (1st round)
- 18 March:
  - Guinea-Bissau, ~~President (1st round)~~ (election nullified)
  - Saint Barthélemy, Legislature
  - Saint Martin, Legislature
  - Saint Pierre and Miquelon, Legislature
- 24 March: Abkhazia, Parliament (2nd round)
- 25 March:
  - Senegal, President (2nd round)
  - Slovenia, Referendum
  - South Ossetia, President (1st round)
  - Wallis and Futuna, Legislature
- 29 March: The Gambia, Parliament

== April ==
- 8 April: South Ossetia, President (2nd round)
- 11 April: South Korea, Parliament
- 16 April: East Timor, President (2nd round)
- 18 April: Guernsey, Legislature
- 22 April: France, President (1st round)

== May ==
- 3 May: Faroe Islands, Referendum
- 4 May: Iran, Parliament (2nd round)
- 6 May:
  - Armenia, Parliament
  - France, President (2nd round)
  - Greece, Parliament
  - Serbia, President (1st round) and Parliament
- 7 May:
  - Bahamas, House of Assembly
  - Syria, Parliament
- 10 May: Algeria, National Assembly
- 20 May:
  - Dominican Republic, President
  - Serbia, President (2nd round)
- 23–24 May: Egypt, President (1st round)
- 26 May: Lesotho, National Assembly
- 31 May: Ireland, Constitutional Referendum

== June ==
- 10 June: France, Parliament (1st round)
- 16–17 June: Egypt, President (2nd round)
- 17 June:
  - France, Parliament (2nd round)
  - Greece, Parliament
  - Switzerland, Referendums
- 23 June – 13 July: Papua New Guinea, Parliament
- 28 June: Mongolia, Parliament
- 30 June: Iceland, President

== July ==
- 1 July:
  - Liechtenstein, Constitutional Referendum
  - Mexico, President, Chamber of Deputies and Senate
  - Senegal, Parliament
- 7 July:
  - East Timor, Parliament
  - Libya, General National Congress
- 15 July: Republic of the Congo, National Assembly (1st round)
- 18 July: Cayman Islands, Referendum
- 19 July: Nagorno-Karabakh, President
- 29 July:
  - Republic of the Congo, National Assembly (2nd round)
  - Romania, Impeachment Referendum

== August ==
- 19 August: Puerto Rico, Constitutional Referendum
- 31 August: Angola, Parliament

== September ==
- 9 September: Hong Kong, Legislature
- 12 September: Netherlands, House of Representatives
- 23 September:
  - Belarus, House of Representatives
  - Pitcairn Islands, Referendum
  - Switzerland, Referendums

== October ==
- 1 October: Georgia, Parliament
- 7 October: Venezuela, President
- 12–13 October: Czech Republic, Senate (1st round)
- 14 October:
  - Lithuania, Parliament (1st round) and Referendum
  - Montenegro, Parliament
- 19 October: Curaçao, Legislature
- 19–20 October: Czech Republic, Senate (2nd round)
- 20 October: Iceland, Constitutional Referendum
- 28 October:
  - Lithuania, Parliament (2nd round)
  - Ukraine, Parliament
- 30 October: Vanuatu, Parliament

== November ==
- 6 November:
  - Palau, President and House of Delegates and Senate
  - United States, President, House of Representatives and Senate
    - American Samoa, Governor (1st round), House of Representatives and Constitutional Referendum
    - Guam, Auditor, Consolidated Commission on Utilities, Education Board, Legislature, Superior Court retention elections and Referendum
    - Northern Mariana Islands, House of Representatives, Senate, Supreme Court retention elections and Constitutional Referendum
    - Puerto Rico, Governor, House of Representatives, Senate and Referendum
    - U.S. Virgin Islands, Board of Education, Board of Elections, Legislature and Referendum
- 9 November: Turks and Caicos Islands, Legislature
- 10 November: Ireland, Constitutional Referendum
- 11 November:
  - San Marino, Parliament
  - Slovenia, President (1st round)
- 17 November: Sierra Leone, President and Parliament
- 20 November: American Samoa, Governor (2nd round)
- 25 November: Switzerland, Referendum

== December ==
- 1 December: Kuwait, Parliament
- 2 December:
  - Burkina Faso, Parliament
  - Slovenia, President (2nd round)
- 7–8 December: Ghana, President and Parliament
- 9 December: Romania, Chamber of Deputies and Senate
- 15 December: Egypt, Constitutional Referendum (1st phase)
- 16 December: Japan, House of Representatives and Supreme Court retention elections
- 17 December: Bermuda, House of Assembly
- 19 December: South Korea, President
- 22 December: Egypt, Constitutional Referendum (2nd phase)

== Indirect elections ==
The following indirect elections of heads of state and the upper houses of bicameral legislatures took place through votes in elected lower houses, unicameral legislatures, or electoral colleges:

- 3 January: Marshall Islands, President
- 11 January and 16 March: Moldova, President
- 19 January, 30 March, and 25 June: India, Council of States
- 29 January: Cambodia, Senate
- 2 March: Pakistan, Senate
- 18 March: Germany, President
- 25 March: Hong Kong, Chief Executive
- 1 April: San Marino, Captains Regent
- 2 May: Hungary, President
- 30 May, 4, 8 and 11 June: Albania, President
- 30 June – 30 September: Belarus, Council of the Republic
- 19 July:
  - India, President
  - Samoa, Head of the Government
- 20 July: Mauritius, President
- 7 August: India, Vice President
- 17 September: Dominica, President
- 28 September: Morocco, House of Councillors
- 1 October: San Marino, Captains Regent
- 21–22 November: Slovenia, National Council
- 29 December: Algeria, Council of the Nation

== See also ==
- 2012 in politics
