= Reux (disambiguation) =

Reux is a commune in the Calvados department of Normandy, France.

Reux may also refer to:

- Reux, Belgium, a commune in the Belgian city of Ciney

People with the surname:

- Victor Reux (1929–2016), French and politician and educator
- Françoise Reux, maiden name of Canadian author Françoise Enguehard
