= Results of the 2024 French legislative election in Saint-Pierre-et-Miquelon =

Following the first round of the 2024 French legislative election on 30 June 2024, runoff elections in each constituency where no candidate received a vote share greater than 50 percent were scheduled for 7 July. Candidates permitted to stand in the runoff elections needed to either come in first or second place in the first round or achieve more than 12.5 percent of the votes of the entire electorate (as opposed to 12.5 percent of the vote share due to low turnout).

== Saint-Pierre-et-Miquelon ==
=== Sole constituency ===
Candidate	Party or alliance		First round		Second round	
Candidate	Party or alliance		Votes	%	Votes	%
Stéphane Lenormand	Miscellaneous right	Independent	1,184	43.09	1,665	61.74
Frédéric Beaumont	New Popular Front	Socialist Party	464	16.89	1,032	38.26
Marion Letournel	Miscellaneous left	La France Insoumise (Note: Dissident who ran without the support of the New Popular Front)	409	14.88		
Patrick Lebailly	Miscellaneous left	Independent	400	14.56		
Carole Leclercq	National Rally		291	10.59		
Total			2,748	100.00	2,697	100.00
Valid votes			2,748	97.90	2,697	95.98
Invalid votes			22	0.78	44	1.57
Blank votes			37	1.32	69	2.46
Total votes			2,807	100.00	2,810	100.00
Registered voters/turnout			5,069	55.38	5,068	55.45
