= 1976 Saint Pierre and Miquelon status referendum =

- 7 March 1976
- Do you accept the bill concerning the departmentalization of the archipelago? French version Acceptez-vous le projet de loi portant départementalisation de l'archipel?

Results
Yes	8.45%
Yes, under duress	62.61%
No	28.94%

An unofficial referendum on becoming an overseas department was held in Saint Pierre and Miquelon on 7 March 1976. The ballot was notable for the inclusion of the protest vote Oui, contraint et forcé ('Yes, under duress'), which received the most votes.

== Background ==
At the time of the referendum, Saint Pierre and Miquelon was classified as an overseas territory, granting it a high degree of autonomy.

However, by the 1970s, the French government began a push to transition the territory into an overseas department, a move that was met largely with local opposition. A draft bill providing for the departmentalization of the islands was tabled in the French Senate on 7 January 1976.

In response, the referendum was convened by the mayors of Saint-Pierre and Miquelon-Langlade, despite disapproval from the islands' deputy and the member of the Economic and Social Council.

== Results ==
Choice	Votes	%
Yes	125	8.45
Yes, under duress	926	62.61
No	428	28.94
Total	1,479	100.00
Valid votes	1,479	98.27
Invalid/blank votes	26	1.73
Total votes	1,505	100.00
Registered voters/turnout	3,645	41.29
Source: Direct Democracy

== Aftermath ==
The results of the referendum were not recognized by the General Council or the French National Assembly.

On 19 July 1976 the bill was ratified and Saint Pierre and Miquelon became an overseas department. Nine years later, on 11 June 1985, the archipelago was reorganized to a territorial collectivity.
