= 2012 United States Virgin Islands hemp referendum =

- 6 November 2012
- Are you in favor of the Legislature enacting legislation that allows for the production, processing, manufacturing and distributing of industrial hemp in the Virgin Islands?

Results
Choice	Votes	%
Yes	4,559	57.47%
No	3,374	42.53%
Valid votes	7,933	27.70%
Invalid or blank votes	20,710	72.30%
Total votes	28,643	100.00%
Registered voters/turnout	49,886	57.42%

A referendum on the use of industrial hemp was held in the United States Virgin Islands on 6 November 2012, alongside general elections. The proposal was approved by 57% of voters.

== Background ==
On 21 August 2012 the Legislature of the Virgin Islands voted by 10–4 to pass a law on the use of industrial hemp (hemp with a low tetrahydrocannabinol content). Governor John de Jongh signed it into law on 11 September 2012.

== Results ==
Are you in favor of the Legislature enacting legislation that allows for the production, processing, manufacturing and distributing of industrial hemp in the Virgin Islands?

Choice	Votes	%
For	4,559	57.47
Against	3,374	42.53
Total	7,933	100.00
Valid votes	7,933	27.70
Invalid/blank votes	20,710	72.30
Total votes	28,643	100.00
Registered voters/turnout	49,886	57.42
Source: Direct Democracy

The unusually high number of blank votes was caused by the question being on the same ballot paper as the simultaneous general elections.
