= Saint Pierre and Miquelon French =

Variety of French from Saint Pierre and Miquelon

- French of Saint Pierre
- français saint-pierrais (French)
- Native to: Saint Pierre and Miquelon
- Native speakers: 5,800 (2025)
- Language family: Indo-European: Italic; Latino-Faliscan; Latinic; Romance; Italo-Western; Western; Gallo-Iberian; Gallo-Romance; Gallo-Rhaetian?; Arpitan–Oïl; Oïl; Francien zone; French; Saint Pierre and Miquelon French

Language codes
- ISO 639-3: –
- Glottolog: None
- Linguasphere: 51-AAA-iia
- IETF: fr-PM

Saint Pierre and Miquelon French (French: français de Saint-Pierre-et-Miquelon) or the Saint Pierre French (French: français saint-pierrais) is a variety of the French language spoken in the territorial collectivity of Saint Pierre and Miquelon. Although the territory is located in North America, St. Pierre and Miquelon French is clearly distinct from Quebec French, Acadian French and the French of Canada's other French-speaking provinces. According to Quebec linguist Jacques Leclerc, it is strongly influenced by the origins of its population, which comes mainly from the Basque Country, Normandy and Brittany. It differs little from the Parisian French, but retains some ‘local particularities’, including a vocabulary of maritime origin. French author and New York University professor Eugène Nicole, who was born in Saint-Pierre-et-Miquelon, distinguishes between Miquelon French, which has retained "Acadian features", and Saint-Pierre French, whose accent has sometimes been "likened to that of Granville".

== History ==
=== Influences ===
Saint-Pierre and Miquelon French has received a significant contribution from the French spoken in the western regions of France, such as Normandy, Brittany, the Basque Country and Poitou.

The influence of Acadian French, on the other hand, is less significant, "although notable (...) particularly in Miquelon", according to Saint-Pierre linguist Andrée Olano. Miquelon, where Acadians from Beaubassin or Beauséjour in New Brunswick had mainly gathered.

Quebec French is said to have influenced Saint-Pierre and Miquelon French, particularly in terms of the climate and flora, such as barachois, bleuet and platebière (plaquebière in Québécois French). According to the Quebec government's Centre de la francophonie des Amériques, Saint-Pierrais and Miquelonnais are a French-speaking society that is "culturally distinct from France".

== Pronunciation ==
The sounds oi are transformed into oué in the last syllable of words, such as vouèr instead of voir, "as can be observed in Normandy" notes the geologist Edgar Aubert de la Rüe, who spent several periods in the archipelago.

In his preface to Mots et expressions de Saint-Pierre-et-Miquelon (Words and Expressions of Saint-Pierre-et-Miquelon), published by the author and self-taught Saint-Pierre historian Marc Dérible in 1993, the former Prefect Bernard Leurquin noted the absence of "the slightest trace of an accent" in Saint-Pierre, but "the phrases, vocabulary, tone and flow that you might hear in Paris, Caen, Brest or Bayonne". On the other hand, he notes the "words and expressions" that are hidden in the spoken language, "giving the archipelago's vocabulary a flavour of its own".

== Glossary ==
Saint Pierre and Miquelon French	Metropolitan French	English gloss	Origin
embarquer	entrer	to enter	Sailors
débarquer	sortir	get out	Sailors
amarrer	attacher	attach	Sailors
embarquer dans son lit	se coucher	go to sleep	Sailors
chavirer son champ	labourer son champ	plough his field	Sailors
débouquer	sortir à l'improviste	going out unexpectedly	Sailors
empoucher	s'empiffrer	guzzle	Sailors
mouiller	s'arrêter	to stop	Sailors
larguer	laisser partir	to let go	Sailors
chiquer	consommer, boire	to consume, to drink	Sailors
grâler	frire, griller	to fry, to grill	Brittany French, Normandy French
garrocher	lancer	to throw	Acadian French
chiquer la raquette	mettre sur la paille	put out of business	Sailors
une taouine	une gifle	a slap	Quebec French
un bleuet	une myrtille	a blueberry	Quebec French
une platebière	une mûre arctique	a cloudberry	Quebec French
un maillou, un mayou	un métropolitain	a French national from mainland France	Sailors
tantôt	tout à l'heure	earlier today	Quebec French, Normandy French
mignon	mon garçon	my boy	Sailors
un Niouf	un habitant de Terre-Neuve	a Newfoundlander	Sailors
un barachois	une étendue d'eau saumâtre	a coastal lagoon	Quebec French, West Indies French
une puck	un palet de hockey sur glace	a hockey puck	Quebec French
le déjeuner	le petit-déjeuner	the breakfast	Quebec French, Belgian French
le dîner	le déjeuner	the lunch	Quebec French, Belgian French
le souper	le dîner	the dinner	Quebec French, Belgian French
coup de calaouine	coup de vent	gale of wind	Newfoundland English

== See also ==
- Saint Pierre and Miquelon Islanders
- Metropolitan French
- Canadian French
- Acadian French
- Quebec French
- Newfoundland French
