= Bernard Briand =

French politician

15th President of the Territorial Council of Saint Pierre and Miquelon
- Incumbent
- Assumed office 13 October 2020
- President: Emmanuel Macron
- Prefect: Bruno André (acting); Christian Pouget; Thierry Devimeux
- Preceded by: Stéphane Lenormand

Personal details
- Born: Bernard Briand; 1 January 1974 (age 52) Saint-Pierre
- Party: Archipelago Tomorrow

Bernard Briand (French pronunciation: [bɛʁnaʁ bʁijɑ̃]; born 1974) is a French politician from Archipelago Tomorrow. He has been President of the Territorial Council of Saint-Pierre-et-Miquelon since 13 October 2020.

== Early life and career ==
He is a physical education and sports (EPS) teacher and a youth and sports advisor.

== Political career ==
Vice-president of Archipelago Tomorrow, Bernard Briand was a candidate in the 2008 French municipal elections in Saint-Pierre, where he won 21.55% of the votes cast. He remained in opposition on the municipal council until 2015.

He was elected President of the Territorial Council of Saint Pierre and Miquelon on October 13, 2020, following the resignation of Stéphane Lenormand for personal reasons. His right-wing list retained the majority with 51% of the vote in the 2022 elections, enabling him to be re-elected president of the territorial council on April 1, 2022.

== See also ==
- Territorial Council of Saint Pierre and Miquelon
