= Marc Plantegenest =

Saint Pierrais politician (1943–2026)

Member of the French Senate for Saint Pierre and Miquelon
- In office 20 September 1981 – 1 October 1986
- Preceded by: Albert Pen
- Succeeded by: Albert Pen

Deputy of the French National Assembly for Saint Pierre and Miquelon's 1st constituency
- In office 3 April 1978 – 22 May 1981
- Preceded by: Frédéric Gabriel
- Succeeded by: Albert Pen

Mayor of Saint-Pierre
- In office 8 December 1998 – 18 March 2001
- Preceded by: Albert Pen
- Succeeded by: Karine Claireaux

Personal details
- Born: 11 June 1953 Saint-Pierre, Saint Pierre and Miquelon
- Died: 6 May 2026 (aged 82)
- Party: Independent
- Other political affiliations: PS
- Occupation: Civil servant

Marc Plantegenest (French: [mˈaʁk plɑ̃təʒnˈɛst]; 11 June 1943 – 6 May 2026) was a French politician who was an independent aligned with the Socialist Party (PS).

Plantegenest served as a deputy in the National Assembly from 1978 to 1981 before joining the Senate from 1981 to 1986. He was also mayor of Saint-Pierre from 1998 to 2001. In 1981, he supported the candidacy of Valéry Giscard d'Estaing in the presidential election.

Plantegenest died on 6 May 2026, at the age of 82.
