= 2017 in politics =

These are some of the notable events relating to politics in 2017.

== Events ==
=== January ===
- January 19 – ECOWAS forces, including troops from Senegal, Ghana, and Nigeria, intervene in the Gambia's political crisis to force longtime President Yahya Jammeh to step down after losing the December 2016 elections to Adama Barrow.
- Donald Trump is sworn in as the 45th U.S. President, Causing Mass protests around the globe.
- January 27 – Worldwide controversy results after United States president Donald Trump signs an executive order restricting travel and immigration from Iraq, Iran, Libya, Somalia, Sudan, Syria and Yemen.

=== March ===
- March 10 – The Constitutional Court of Korea unanimously upheld the impeachment of President Park Geun-hye, marking the first such instance of the removal of sitting President in office since the nation's sixth democratization in 1987. Her impeachment triggered a snap presidential election on 9 May per the constitution; Moon Jae-in won and succeeded Park in her place.
- March 29 – The United Kingdom invokes Article 50 of the Treaty on European Union, beginning the formal EU withdrawal process.

=== June ===
- June 1 – U.S. President Donald Trump announces that the United States is to withdraw from the Paris Agreement.
- June 5
  - Montenegro becomes the 29th member of NATO.
  - Multiple Arab countries, including Bahrain, Egypt, Libya, Mauritania, Saudi Arabia, Yemen, the United Arab Emirates, and the Maldives, cut diplomatic ties with Qatar, accusing it of destabilising the region.

=== July ===
- July 6 – The European Union and Japan conclude a landmark free trade deal in Brussels.

=== August ===
- August 8 – After reports that North Korea has produced a nuclear warhead small enough to fit inside its missiles, President Trump warns that the country "will be met with fire and fury" if it threatens the US.

=== September ===
- September 13 – Former Singaporean Speaker Halimah Yacob was declared President-elect unopposed in that year's Presidential election and was inaugurated the following day, sparking nationwide controversy.
- September 19 – President Donald Trump gives speech at United Nations meeting in Manhattan, New York during which he threatens to "totally destroy North Korea" if the USA "was forced to defend itself or its allies".

=== November ===
- 13 November – David Davis announces that Parliament will be given a vote on the final Brexit deal before the United Kingdom leaves the European Union in 2019.
