= 2017 Swiss referendums =

National referendums held in Switzerland in 2017

Seven national referendums were held in Switzerland during 2017. Polling took place on 12 February, 21 May and 24 September, whilst no referendum was scheduled for the November date.

== February referendums ==
Three referendums were held on 12 February:

- One on the federal decree of 30 September 2016, to allow easier naturalisation of third generation immigrants
- One on the federal decree of 30 September 2016, to create a fund for national roads and urban infrastructure
- One on the federal law of 17 June 2016, to overhaul the corporate tax code to attract and retain international firms

=== Results ===
Question	For		Against		Invalid/ blank	Total votes	Registered voters	Turnout	Cantons for		Cantons against		Result
Question	Votes	%	Votes	%	Invalid/ blank	Total votes	Registered voters	Turnout	Full	Half	Full	Half	Result
Easier naturalisation of third-generation immigrants	1,499,627	60.4	982,844	39.6	20,979	2,503,450	5,344,186	46.8	15	4	5	2	Approved
Road and infrastructure fund	1,503,746	61.9	923,783	38.1	63,791	2,491,320	5,344,186	46.6	20	6	0	0	Approved
Corporate tax code	989,311	40.9	1,428,162	59.1	73,312	2,490,785	5,344,186	46.6					Rejected
Source: Federal Chancellery of Switzerland 1, 2, 3

== May referendum ==
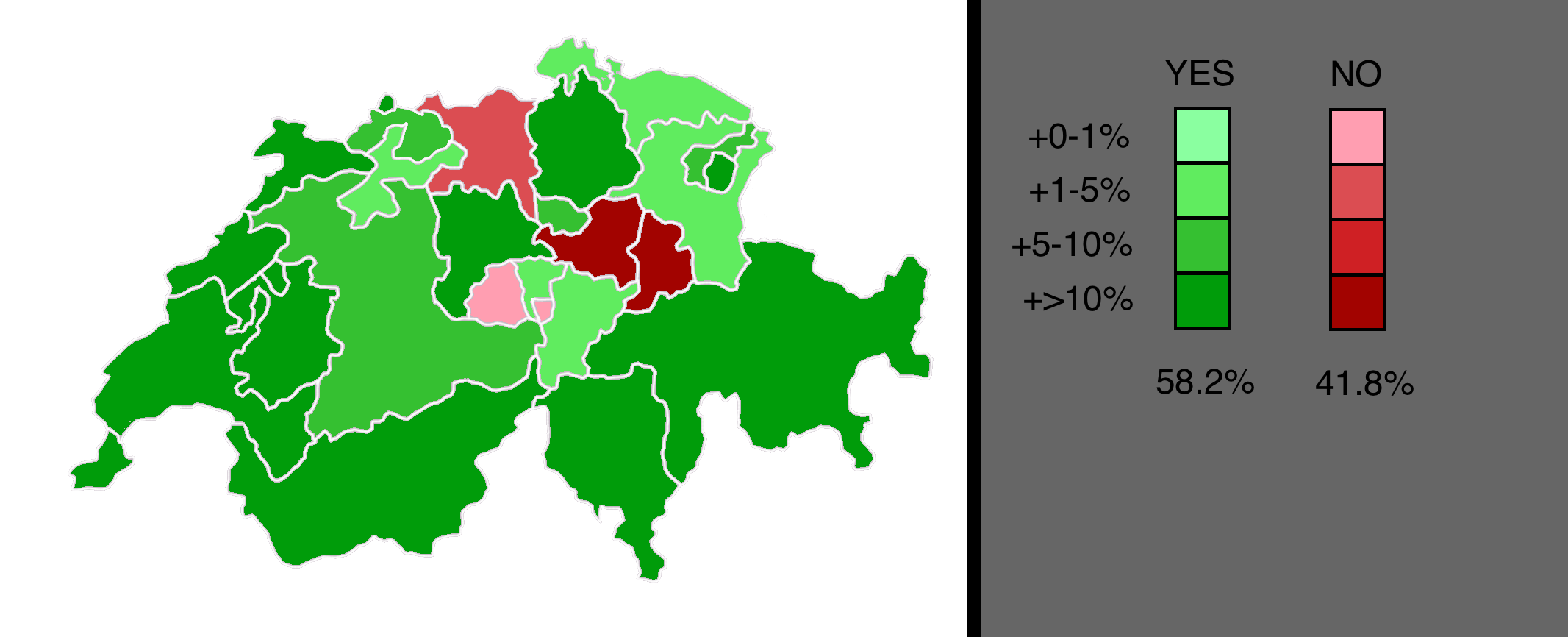
Results by canton

One referendum was held on 21 May on whether to accept the new Energy Act, establishing the Energy Strategy 2050, which seeks to phase out nuclear energy and increase renewable energy and energy efficiency. The plan was opposed by the Swiss People's Party, which launched the optional referendum against it. The Energy Act was approved by 58% of voters.

Question	For		Against		Invalid/ blank	Total votes	Registered voters	Turnout	Result
Question	Votes	%	Votes	%	Invalid/ blank	Total votes	Registered voters	Turnout	Result
Energy Act	1,322,263	58.2	949,053	41.8	25,980	2,297,296	5,356,538	42.9	Approved
Source: Federal Chancellery of Switzerland

== September referendums ==
On 24 September referendums were held on:

- A Federal Decree on Food Security
- A Federal Decree on Additional Funding for OASI Pensions
- A Federal Act on the 2020 Pension Reforms

The latter two referendums were related, and the Federal Act on the 2020 Pension Reforms would only have gone into effect if the proposed VAT increase was also accepted by voters. The pension reform would have raised the women's retirement age to 65. The proposed reforms were supported by centre and left-of-centre parties and opposed by right-of-centre parties such as the FDP.The Liberals and the Swiss People's Party.

Question	For		Against		Invalid/ blank	Total votes	Registered voters	Turnout	Cantons for		Cantons against		Result
Question	Votes	%	Votes	%	Invalid/ blank	Total votes	Registered voters	Turnout	Full	Half	Full	Half	Result
Food security	1,943,180	78.7	524,919	21.3	63,110	2,531,209	5,372,748	47.1	20	6	0	0	Approved
Additional funding for OASI pensions	1,254,795	50.0	1,257,156	50.0	34,435	2,546,386	5,372,748	47.4	9	1	11	5	Rejected
2020 pension reforms	1,186,203	47.3	1,320,952	52.7	38,742	2,545,897	5,372,748	47.4					Rejected
Source: Federal Chancellery of Switzerland 1, 2, 3
