= Municipal governments in Saint Pierre and Miquelon =

Municipal governments in Saint Pierre and Miquelon are responsible for day-to-day function on the islands and are in effect city council or a level of local government under the General Council.

There are two communes in the territory, Miquelon-Langlade and Saint-Pierre.

The municipal council is made up of the mayor, councillors (conseillers) and associates (adjoints).

== Saint-Pierre ==
The local government of Saint-Pierre consist of the mayor (maire) and councillors (conseillers). The council sits at a three-storey structure on rue de Paris. The senior council in 2006 consisted of:

- Maire de Saint-Pierre - Madame Karine CLAIREAUX
- Adjoints - Madame Josée QUEDINET-DETCHEVERRY
- Adjoints - Monsieur Frédéric BEAUMONT
- Adjoints - Monsieur Claude ARROSSAMENA
- Adjoints - Monsieur Rémi GIRARDIN
- Adjoints - Madame Josée BEAUPERTUIS GOUPILLIERE
- Adjoints - Monsieur Patrick LEBAILLY
- Adjoints - Madame Rachel POUETH ANDRIEUX
- Adjoints - Monsieur Yvon SALOMON

Unlike the council on Miquelon-Langlade, the general council members are divided into the governing council and opposition members.

The general council in 2006 consisted of:

Les Conseillers de la majorité

- Monsieur Norbert HACALA
- Madame Thérèse POIRIER
- Madame Claudette FRANCHE-RUAULT
- Monsieur Jean-François OZON
- Madame Maryse GORGET-TESNIERE
- Madame Lydia DESDOUETS-LE SOAVEC
- Monsieur Bruno ARTHUR
- Madame Véronique GIRARDIN
- Monsieur Jérôme DETCHEVERRY
- Madame Marie-Luce BRIAND
- Monsieur Jean-Marie QUEDINET
- Monsieur Michel JACCACHURY
- Madame Marie-Claire RIO
- Madame Martine RIOU-MICHEL

Les Conseillers de l'opposition

- Madame Jacqueline POIRIER
- Madame Dominica MICHEL-REVERT
- Monsieur Loïc FOUCHARD
- Madame Tatiana URTIZBEREA
- Monsieur Thierry LETOURNEL
- Monsieur Pascal DEROUET

== Miquelon-Langlade ==
The local government of Mairie de Miquelon-Langlade is led by the maire or mayor and conseillers or councillors. The council sits at a two-storey structure on rue Baron de l'Espérance.

The council in 2006 consisted of:

- Le Maire de Miquelon-Langlade Denis Detcheverry
- Adjoints - Stéphane COSTE
- Adjoints - Gérald BOISSEL
- Adjoints - Gino BONNIEUL
- Adjoints - Chantal MICHEL
- Conseillers - Carole EPAULE
- Conseillers - Carine DETCHEVERRY
- Conseillers - Flore ORSINY
- Conseillers - Dominique AUTIN
- Conseillers - Roger ETCHEBERRY
- Conseillers - Marianne GUEGUEN
- Conseillers - Yann BOUTEILLER
- Conseillers - Paul-André LUCAS
- Conseillers - Martial DETCHEVERRY
- Conseillers - Cyrille DETCHEVERRY
