= 2017 Yamagata gubernatorial election =

← 2013	22 January 2017	2021 →
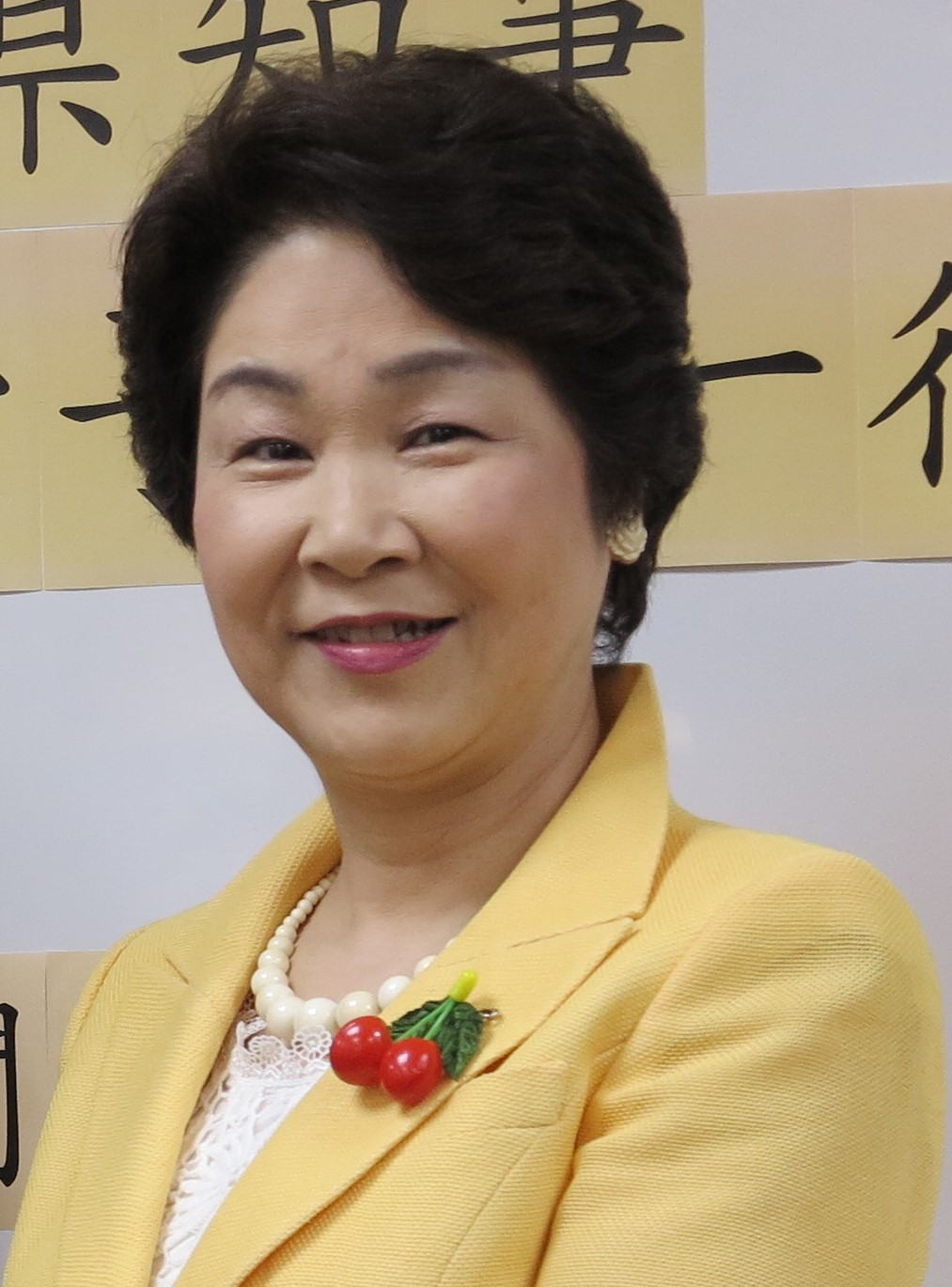
Nominee	Mieko Yoshimura
Party	Independent
Alliance	Prefectural Citizen's Party
Popular vote	Acclaimed
Governor before election
Mieko Yoshimura
Independent
Elected Governor
Mieko Yoshimura
Independent

The 2017 Yamagata Gubernatorial Election was a gubernatorial election that was called in Yamagata Prefecture for 22 January 2017. Mieko Yoshimura, governor since 2009, ran for a third term. Her Prefectural Citizen's Party alliance was supported by the Democratic Party, the Social Democratic Party, and the Communist Party. Because no other candidates entered the race, Yoshimura was declared the winner without a vote. Having similarly been declared winner by acclamation in 2013, this became only the third time in Japanese history that a governor was elected twice without holding a vote.
