= 2017 Montenegrin municipal elections =

Local elections in Montenegro

2017 Montenegrin local elections
- 12 March-7 May (Nikšić and H. Novi); 26 November (3 municipalities)
- 170 seats in local parliaments
Party	Leader	Vote %	Seats	+/–
DPS	Milo Đukanović	60.58	103	+25
DCG	Aleksa Bečić	12.35	21	New
SD	Ivan Brajović	5.88	10	New
DF	Andrija Mandić	4.70	8	−17
URA	Dritan Abazović	3.52	6	New
BS	Rafet Husović	2.94	5	+1
SDP	Ranko Krivokapić	2.94	5	−23
SNP	Vladimir Joković	2.35	4	−11
NL	Savo Marić	1.74	3	+1
This lists parties that won seats. See the complete results below.
Mayoral seats before	Mayoral seats after
DPS (5)	DPS (4); DCG (1)

Local elections were held on 12 March 2017 in Nikšić, on 7 May in Herceg Novi and on 26 November in the municipalities of Cetinje, Mojkovac and Petnjica, as well as Tuzi, which is set to become a municipality in 2018.

== Results ==
=== March election ===
==== Nikšić ====
Party	Votes	%	Seats
Democratic Party of Socialists	21,104	80.18%	37
Social Democrats	2,324	8.83%	4
Invalid votes/blank	2,894	10.99%	-

Local election for Nikšić Municipality was held on 12 March 2017. It was boycotted by all the opposition parties after the Government announced the imprisonment of the leaders of the opposition coalition Democratic Front. Only the ruling DPS and its minor partner SD ran in the election, with voter turnout at 45%, while 11% of the votes cast were spoilt.

Turnout: 45.00%

Elected mayor: Veselin Grbović (DPS)

=== May elections ===
==== Herceg Novi ====
Party	Votes	%	Seats
Democratic Party of Socialists	5,134	31.35%	12
Democrats	3,967	24.22%	9
Democratic Front	1,759	10.74%	4
Novi List	1,274	7.78%	3
Socialist People's Party	894	5.46%	2
The Choice	813	4.96%	1
Social Democrats	759	4.63%	1
Social Democratic Party – URA	673	4.11%	1
Civic List for Herceg Novi	603	3.68%	1
DEMOS	191	1.17%	-
Montenegrin	187	1.14%	-
Boka Democratic League	122	0.74%	-
Invalid votes/blank	330	-	-

Turnout: 67.02%

Elected mayor: Stevan Katić (Democrats)

=== November elections ===
==== Cetinje ====
Party	Votes	%	Seats
Democratic Party of Socialists	4,391	44.1%	16
United Reform Action	1,434	14.4%	5
Democrats	1,375	13.8%	5
Social Democratic Party	926	9.3%	3
Old Guard of the Liberal Alliance	672	6.7%	2
Social Democrats	579	5.8%	2
Democratic Front	195	2%	-
Montenegrin	194	2%	-
Positive Montenegro	114	1.1%	-
SNP – Liberal Party	84	0.8%	-
Invalid votes/blank			

Turnout: 70.9%

Elected mayor: Aleksandar Kašćelan (DPS)

==== Mojkovac ====
Party	Votes	%	Seats
Democratic Party of Socialists	3,195	54.6%	18
Democrats	1,003	17.1%	5
Democratic Front	785	13.4%	4
Socialist People's Party	376	6.4%	2
Social Democrats	210	3.6%	1
United Reform Action	204	3.5%	1
Social Democratic Party	79	1.3%	-
Invalid votes/blank	85		

Turnout: 83.5%

Elected mayor: Ranko Mišnić (DPS)

==== Petnjica ====
Party	Votes	%	Seats
Democratic Party of Socialists	1745	57,9%	20
Bosniak Party	441	14,6%	5
Social Democrats	348	11,5%	3
Social Democratic Party	154	5,1%	1
Bosniak Democratic Union	103	3,4%	1
Democrats	98	3,3%	1
Positive Montenegro	69	2,3%	-
Socialist People's Party	56	1,9%	-
Invalid votes/blank	22		

Turnout: 48.66%

Elected mayor: Samir Agović (DPS)

==== Tuzi, Podgorica ====
Party	Votes	%	Seats
Democratic Party of Socialists	2881	41,2%	14
Albanian Alternative	1358	19,4%	7
Bosniak Party	751	10,7%	3
Democratic League	586	8,4%	3
Democratic Union of Albanians	440	6,3%	2
Democrats	388	5,6%	2
Social Democrats	310	4,4%	1
Social Democratic Party	151	2,2%	-
Socialist People's Party	124	1,8%	-
Invalid votes/blank	59		

Turnout: 60.7%

Elected mayor: Nik Gjeloshaj (AA)
