= 2017 Saint Pierre and Miquelon legislative election =

Parliamentary election held in Saint Pierre and Miquelon

Elections took place on Sunday 19 March 2017 in Saint Pierre and Miquelon, a self-governing territorial overseas collectivity of France. All 19 seats on the Territorial Council were up for election. The previous elections were held in 2012. The Archipelago Tomorrow Party won another supermajority of seats.

== Results ==
Party	Votes	%	Seats	+/–
Archipelago Tomorrow	2,324	70.17	17	+2
Focus on the Future	988	29.83	2	–2
Total	3,312	100.00	19	0
Valid votes	3,312	92.36		
Invalid/blank votes	274	7.64		
Total votes	3,586	100.00		
Registered voters/turnout	5,012	71.55		
Source: Government of Saint Pierre and Miquelon
