= Henri Claireaux =

French politician (1911–2001)

Senator for Saint Pierre and Miquelon
- In office 21 January 1947 – 1 October 1968
- Preceded by: Office established
- Succeeded by: Albert Pen

Personal details
- Born: 3 February 1911 Saint-Pierre, Saint Pierre and Miquelon
- Died: 31 July 2001 (aged 90) Soustons, Landes, France
- Party: Popular Republican Movement
- Education: Université Laval
- Occupation: Politician · teacher

Henri Claireaux (3 February 1911 – 31 July 2001) was a French politician from Saint Pierre and Miquelon. He was the territory's first representative in the Senate, serving from 1947 to 1968.

Born in Saint-Pierre, Saint Pierre and Miquelon, Claireaux briefly worked for the Saint-Pierre town hall after receiving an elementary certificate, then moved to mainland France to volunteer for the French Armed Forces. After returning to Saint-Pierre, he became a teacher and prominent figure in local labor unions. He was elected to the General Council of Saint Pierre and Miquelon in 1946 and was then elected to the Senate of France in 1947, becoming his territory's first representative in the Senate. His main contributions there were for legislation relating to overseas territories, and he also became the president of the General Council of Saint Pierre and Miquelon in 1956. He left the General Council in 1964 and was defeated in the 1968 Senatorial election, marking the end of his 22-year career as a legislator.

== Early life ==
Claireaux was born on 3 February 1911 in Saint-Pierre, Saint Pierre and Miquelon, an overseas territory of France. After receiving an elementary certificate, he became an assistant secretary for the Saint-Pierre town hall, resigning two years later to work for a commercial establishment. In 1934, he left Saint-Pierre and moved to mainland France to volunteer for the French Armed Forces. After serving for a time in France, he studied at the Pierre Institute in Luxembourg and received a higher certificate after three years of attendance.

After graduating from the Pierre Institute, Claireaux returned to Saint-Pierre and became a school teacher at the Collège Saint-Christophe. He also was a prominent figure in local labor unions, becoming the secretary of the Trade Union Chamber of the Port Workers of Saint-Pierre in 1939. Also that year, he was elected to the administrative council of the territory, serving until 1945. He also attended Université Laval in Quebec during this time, studying political science from 1941 to 1942.

== Political career ==
Following World War II, Claireaux entered politics by running for election to the constituent assembly, losing to Henri Debidour. Soon after, Claireaux won election to the General Council of Saint Pierre and Miquelon in December 1946. In January 1947, he was elected to the French Senate by receiving 11 out of 11 votes of the members of the General Council. A member of the Popular Republican Movement, he became the first representative of Saint Pierre and Miquelon in the Senate. In the Senate, he was a member of the commissions on Overseas France, the Navy and Fisheries.

Claireaux won re-election to the Senate in December 1948, receiving 10 out of 13 votes, and in 1952, receiving all 11 votes. During his first years in the parliament, he showed interest in the development of overseas territories, working with legislation on housing for overseas parliamentarians and exchange regulations in 1948, overseas economic policy in 1949, salaries of civil servants in overseas territories in 1950, helping establish the labor code for overseas territories in 1951, being the rapporteur for the Marine Commission in 1952, working on aid for exporting overseas products in 1953, and drafting framework law for the territories in 1956.

Claireaux had moved to France upon his election to the Senate. He became the president of the General Council of Saint Pierre and Miquelon in 1956, and managed affairs there remotely. His party's candidate was usually elected to the French National Assembly each election. As a member of the General Council, he helped form a family code, a social security system, a real estate cooperative, and helped build an ice rink. He also helped build a new port, a fishing company, a vocational school and a private education college.

Claireaux was opposed to the reduction of a subsidy to Saint Pierre and Miquelon in 1958 and gave several speeches on the topic, including getting into a heated exchange with Jacques Soustelle in November 1959, in which he claimed that it had devolved Saint Pierre to "a state bordering on poverty", with Soustelle calling Claireaux's statements as "allegations that do not correspond to reality." In January 1960, he led a mass resignation of 10 of the 14 members of the General Council in protest and spoke before the French government of the financial situation. In April 1960, general elections occurred and Claireaux was re-elected, with his side winning 13 of 14 seats. Later that year, he "rejoiced" at the Senate when a new Minister for Overseas Territories – Robert Lecourt – was appointed who seemed to understand the financial crisis, although Claireaux expressed major disappointment the following year when a newly-passed finance law did nothing specifically for the territory.

In 1961, Claireaux was rapporteur in the drafting of a program law for overseas territories. He also gave a speech to the Economic Affairs Committee again advocating for improvements to the financial situation. In 1963, he recommended the installation of a "'a powerful medium wave transmitter near the American continent, that is to say in Saint-Pierre-et-Miquelon,' to allow French speakers in North America to receive French broadcasts." Claireaux gave a speech in 1964 expressing sadness that Georges Pompidou's government did not provide subsidies for Saint Pierre, describing the territory as "a population of 5,000 inhabitants who have no other resources than a poor industry, that of fishing," calling it "a lack of a spirit of justice."

Back in Saint Pierre, Claireaux's candidate for the National Assembly was rejected for the first time in 1962, with the territory electing Albert Briand, a merchant and manager of the island's largest hotel and store. Briand, who was unable to work with the Claireaux-supporting members of the General Council, resigned in June 1964 but was re-elected to the National Assembly two months later. Subsequently, Claireaux and his followers resigned from the council en masse in November 1964. From 1966 to 1968, Claireaux was less active in the Senate, with his last speech having been in November 1965. In the 1968 Senatorial election, Claireaux was defeated by Albert Pen, who took 12 votes out of 23 councilors, with Paul Lebailly receiving 7 and Claireaux 4. It marked the end of his 22-year tenure in the Senate.

== Death ==
Claireaux died on 31 July 2001 in Soustons, Landes, France. In 2005, a memorial stamp was issued of Claireaux in Saint Pierre and Miquelon.
