= 2012 Saint Pierre and Miquelon legislative election =

Parliamentary election held in Saint Pierre and Miquelon

Legislative elections for the Territorial Council were held in Saint Pierre and Miquelon on 18 March 2012.

== Results ==
Party	Votes	%	Seats	+/–
Archipelago Tomorrow	1,937	52.55	15	–1
Together for the Future	1,749	47.45	4	+2
Total	3,686	100.00	19	0
Valid votes	3,686	95.20		
Invalid/blank votes	186	4.80		
Total votes	3,872	100.00		
Registered voters/turnout	4,920	78.70		
Source: Saint-Pierre et Miquelon : Ephémérides
