= Catherine Hélène =

Politician from Saint Pierre and Miquelon

Catherine Hélène is a French politician from Saint Pierre and Miquelon, who is the Second Vice-President of the Territorial Council of Saint Pierre and Miquelon. Hélène was appointed to the role in October 2017. In 2019, she helped to lead national mourning for Jacques Chirac in the territory. She is a member of the political party Archipelago Tomorrow. Hélène is a member of a number of committees, including those for the environment, public health, disability and philately. She is also a member of the National Biodiversity Committee of France.
