= Albert Pen =

Senator for Saint Pierre and Miquelon
- In office October 2, 1968 – June 21, 1981
- Preceded by: Henri Claireaux
- Succeeded by: Marc Plantegenest
- In office October 1, 1986 – September 30, 1995
- Preceded by: Marc Plantegenest
- Succeeded by: Victor Reux

Deputy to the National Assembly for Saint Pierre and Miquelon
- In office June 21, 1981 – April 1, 1986
- Preceded by: Marc Plantegenest
- Succeeded by: Gérard Grignon

Personal details
- Born: 1 March 1931 Dartmouth, Nova Scotia, Canada
- Died: 3 July 2003 (aged 72) Caen, France
- Party: UDR (1968–1969); Independent (1969–1974); Socialist (1974–)

Albert Pen (March 1, 1931 – July 3, 2003) was a politician from Saint Pierre and Miquelon who represented the island territory in both the French Senate and the National Assembly. He was a senator from 1968 to 1981, a deputy to the National Assembly from 1981 to 1986, and then a senator again from 1986 to 1995.

== Early life ==
Albert Pen was born in Dartmouth, Nova Scotia, to French parents originally from Brittany. He attended school at the Lycée Chaptal in Paris, and then went on to study teaching. Between 1954 and 1960 Pen taught for periods at Bayeux, Étréham, and Nonant (all in the Calvados department of Normandy). He moved to Saint Pierre and Miquelon in 1960 to teach at the Lycée-Collège d'État Émile Letournel. He became the college's director in 1963.

== Politics ==
Albert Pen was elected to the General Council of Saint Pierre and Miquelon in 1964, of which he became vice-president and then president from 1968 to 1984. He was also elected mayor of Saint-Pierre in 1971.

At the 1968 legislative elections Pen was elected to the Senate for the Union of Democrats for the Republic, defeating Henri Claireaux of the Christian Democratic Party. Somewhat of a maverick, he left the UDR in 1969 to sit as an independent, and then in 1974 joined the Socialist Party. He left the Socialist caucus in 1977 to protest a lack of Overseas French representation at its national conference, but eventually rejoined. He would frequently vote against his own party, however, especially on issues relating to his constituency.

In 1981 Pen left the Senate to switch to the National Assembly, effectively swapping places with Marc Plantegenest. He returned to the Senate in 1986, remaining as a senator until being defeated by Victor Reux (UPM) at the 1995 elections. Pen strongly opposed the French government position on the Canada–France Maritime Boundary Case, which saw Saint Pierre and Miquelon lose much of its claimed exclusive economic zone to Canada.
