= 2017 Saint Martin Territorial Council election =

Territorial Council elections were held in the French overseas collectivity of Saint Martin on 20 March 2017.

== Results ==
Party	First round		Second round		Seats
Party	Votes	%	Votes	%	Seats
Team Gibbs 2017	4,077	49.05	5,695	64.31	18
Movement for Justice and Prosperity	1,141	13.73	2,138	24.14	4
On the Way to Progress	1,026	12.34	1,022	11.54	1
Generation Hope	724	8.71			0
Proceed for Saint Martin	536	6.45			0
Saint Martin Civic Movement	418	5.03			0
New Direction for Saint Martin	215	2.59			0
Soualiga Movement	175	2.11			0
Total	8,312	100.00	8,855	100.00	23
Valid votes	8,312	96.00	8,855	96.21	
Invalid/blank votes	346	4.00	349	3.79	
Total votes	8,658	100.00	9,204	100.00	
Registered voters/turnout	20,260	42.73	20,238	45.48	
Source: Prefectural government, Prefectural government
