= 2022 Saint Pierre and Miquelon legislative election =

Territorial Council elections were held in Saint Pierre and Miquelon, a self-governing territorial overseas collectivity of France, on 20 March 2022. All 19 seats on the Territorial Council were up for election.

== Results ==
Party	First round		Second round		Seats	+/–
Party	Votes	%	Votes	%	Seats	+/–
Archipelago Tomorrow	1,529	45.92	1,991	51.78	15	–2
Focus on the Future	1,231	36.97	1,466	38.13	4	+2
Together to Build	570	17.12	388	10.09	0	New
Total	3,330	100.00	3,845	100.00	19	0
Valid votes	3,330	97.00	3,845	98.49		
Invalid/blank votes	103	3.00	59	1.51		
Total votes	3,433	100.00	3,904	100.00		
Registered voters/turnout	5,002	68.63	5,001	78.06		
Source: Government of Saint Pierre and Miquelon
