= 2012 United States Virgin Islands general election =

The United States Virgin Islands general election was held on 6 November 2012. Voters chose the non-voting delegate to the United States House of Representatives, the Board of Education, the Board of Elections, and all fifteen seats in the Legislature of the Virgin Islands.

== Territorial Legislature ==
Senator At Large
Candidate	Party	Votes	%
Craig W. Barshinger	Democratic Party	12,795	65.30
Wilma Marsh Monsanto	Independent	6,724	34.32
Write in		74	0.38
Total		19,593	100.00
Total votes		28,643	–
Registered voters/turnout		49,886	57.42

St. Thomas/St. John
Candidate	Party	Votes	%
Clifford Graham	Democratic Party	7,727	10.17
Myron D. Jackson	Democratic Party	5,331	7.02
Shawn Michael Malone	Democratic Party	5,249	6.91
Janette Millin Young	Democratic Party	4,924	6.48
Clarence Payne	Democratic Party	4,350	5.73
Tregenza Roach	Independent	4,213	5.55
Donald "Ducks" Cole	Democratic Party	3,667	4.83
Lawrence "Recon" Olive	Independent	3,603	4.74
Justin Harrigan Sr.	Democratic Party	3,602	4.74
Lisa M. Williams	Independent	3,060	4.03
Horace T. Brooks	Independent	2,821	3.71
Marvin Blyden	Independent	2,393	3.15
Paul Alexander	Independent	2,357	3.10
Sean A. Georges	Independent	2,338	3.08
Louis Willis	Independent	2,307	3.04
Kent E. Bernier Sr.	Democratic Party	2,146	2.83
Alma Francis-Heyliger	Independent	2,143	2.82
Janelle K. Sarauw	Independent	1,904	2.51
Stephen "Smokey" Frett	Independent Citizens Movement	1,836	2.42
Cecilia Milliner-Emanuel	Independent	1,344	1.77
Joseph "Wojo" Gumbs	Independent Citizens Movement	1,148	1.51
Kyza A. Callwood	Independent	1,045	1.38
Shirley M. Sadler	Independent	985	1.30
Elvin R. Fahie Sr.	Independent	899	1.18
Neville "Champy" Amey	Independent	795	1.05
Allan M. Friedman	Independent	696	0.92
Carol Berry	Independent	689	0.91
Omodoso Amin Muhammad	Independent	466	0.61
Josephine M. Lindquist	Independent	382	0.50
Jodi Hodge	Republican Party	331	0.44
Andres Tietje	Independent	294	0.39
Cleone Marrishow	Independent	254	0.33
Orial Tommy Webb	Republican Party	233	0.31
Walter Brown	Independent Citizens Movement	213	0.28
Charlesworth R. Halstead	Independent Citizens Movement	139	0.18
Write in		58	0.08
Total		75,942	100.00
Total votes		14,002	–
Registered voters/turnout		25,507	54.89

St. Croix
Candidate	Party	Votes	%
Alicia "Chucky" Hansen	Independent	5,461	8.05
Sammuel Sanes	Democratic Party	5,221	7.70
Judi Fricks-Buckley	Independent	5,124	7.55
Nereida Rivera O'Reilly	Independent	4,800	7.08
Diane Capehart	Democratic Party	4,471	6.59
Terrence "Positive" Nelson	Independent Citizens Movement	4,359	6.43
Kenneth L. Gittens	Democratic Party	3,809	5.62
Neville James	Democratic Party	3,138	4.63
Jamila A. Russell	Independent	2,846	4.20
Arthur A. Joseph	Independent Citizens Movement	2,731	4.03
Naomi Sandra Joseph	Independent Citizens Movement	2,507	3.70
Pedro Cruz	Independent	2,068	3.05
John Michael Canegata	Republican Party	1,920	2.83
Samuel J. Baptiste	Independent	1,849	2.73
Ronald E. Russell	Democratic Party	1,695	2.50
Myron A. Allick	Independent	1,618	2.39
Gwendolyn D. Hall Brady	Republican Party	1,594	2.35
Troy D. Mason	Democratic Party	1,547	2.28
Percival Tahemah Edwards	Independent	1,449	2.14
Michael John Springer Jr.	Independent	1,419	2.09
Eugene E. LaCorbiniere	Democratic Party	1,358	2.00
Luis R. Ayala Jr.	Independent	986	1.45
Carmen B. Cintron	Independent	965	1.42
George Moore	Independent Citizens Movement	859	1.27
Sherrymann A. Whilshire	Independent	798	1.18
Wayne "Bully" Petersen	Republican Party	754	1.11
Jay Watson	Independent	749	1.10
Norman A. George	Independent	688	1.01
George T. Cyril Sr.	Independent	528	0.78
Irving Jermaine Julien	Independent	413	0.61
Write in		100	0.15
Total		67,824	100.00
Total votes		14,641	–
Registered voters/turnout		24,379	60.06

== Delegate to the United States House of Representatives ==
2012 United States House of Representatives election in the United States Virgin Islands
- November 6, 2012
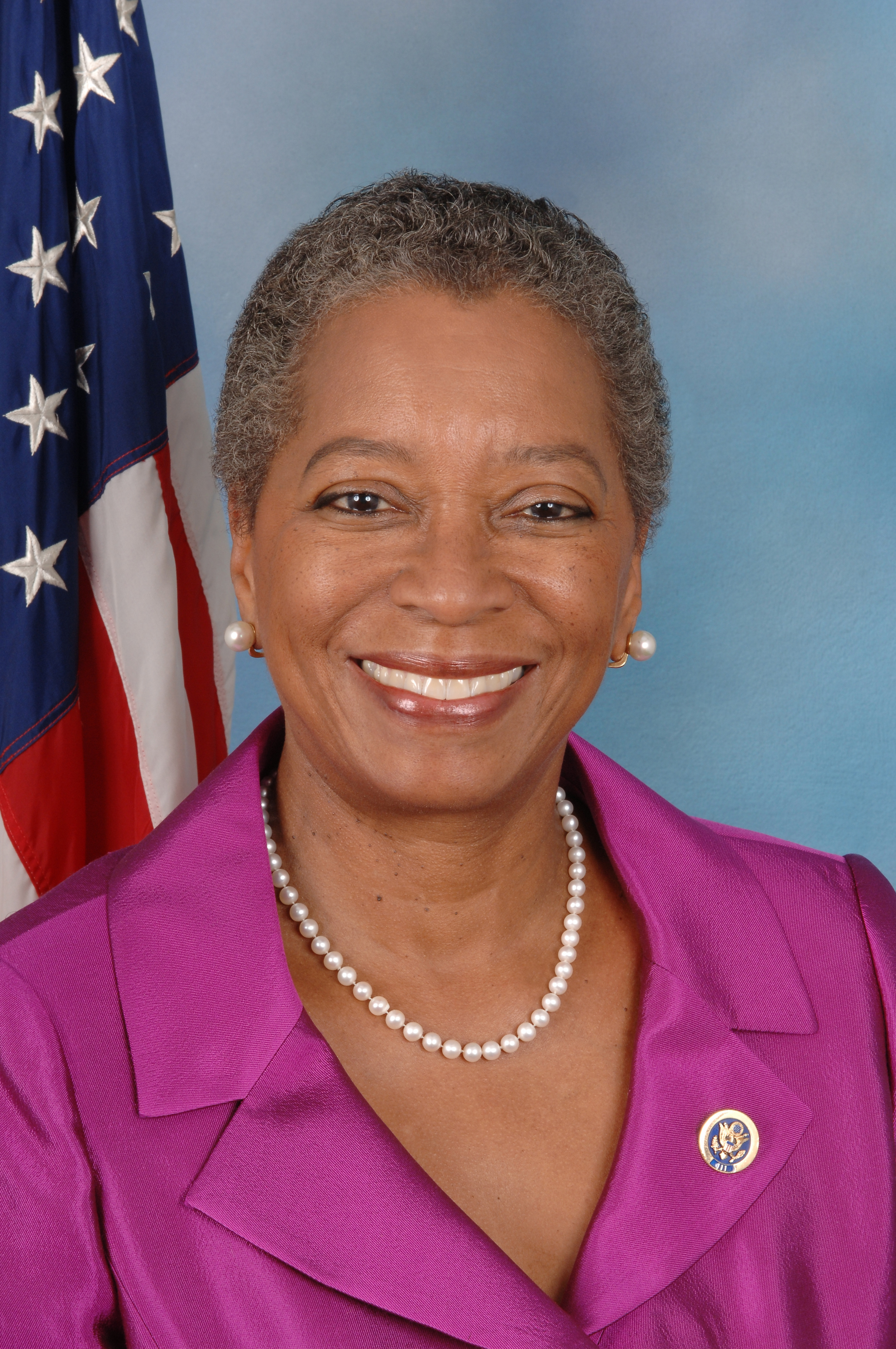

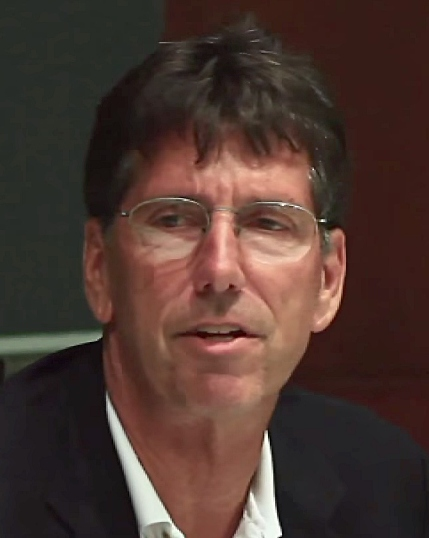

Nominee	Donna Christian-Christensen	Warren Mosler	Norma Pickard-Samuel
Party	Democratic	Independent	Independent
Popular vote	13,273	3,968	3,386
Percentage	56.61%	16.92%	14.44%
Nominee	Holland L. Redfield, II
Party	Republican
Popular vote	2,409
Percentage	10.28%
Representative before election
Donna Christian-Christensen
Democratic
Elected Representative
Donna Christian-Christensen
Democratic

The 2012 United States House of Representatives election in the United States Virgin Islands was held on Tuesday, November 6, 2012, and elected the non-voting Delegate to the United States House of Representatives from the United States Virgin Islands. The election coincided with the elections of other federal offices, including a quadrennial presidential election.

The non-voting delegate is elected for two-year terms. Democratic incumbent Donna Christian-Christensen, who had represented the district since 1997, won re-election.

Primary elections were held on September 8, 2012.

=== Democratic primary ===
- Donna Christian-Christensen, incumbent Delegate
- Stacey Plaskett, attorney and former Congressional staffer

Candidate	Votes	%
Donna Christian-Christensen	3,957	55.33
Stacey Plaskett	3,187	44.57
Write in	7	0.10
Total	7,151	100.00

=== Republican primary ===
- Vince Danet, Republican nominee for Delegate in 2010
- Holland Redfield, radio talk show host and former Virgin Islands Senator

Candidate	Votes	%
Holland L. Redfield II	143	70.44
Vincent E. Danet	59	29.06
Write in	1	0.49
Total	203	100.00

=== General election ===
- Guillaume Mimoun (I), perennial candidate
- Warren Mosler (I), perennial candidate
- Norma Pickard Samuel (I)

Candidate	Party	Votes	%
Donna Christian-Christensen	Democratic Party	13,273	56.61
Warren Mosler	Independent	3,968	16.92
Norma Pickard-Samuel	Independent	3,386	14.44
Holland L. Redfield II	Republican Party	2,409	10.28
Guillaume Mimoun	Independent	375	1.60
Write in		34	0.15
Total		23,445	100.00
Total votes		28,643	–
Registered voters/turnout		49,886	57.42
