= 2017 Abkhazian parliamentary election =

- 12 March 2017 (first round); 26 March 2017 (second round)
- All 35 seats in the People's Assembly; 18 seats needed for a majority
Party	Leader	Seats
FNUA	Daur Arshba	6
United Abkhazia	Sergei Shamba	3
Independents	–	26
This lists parties that won seats. See the complete results below.
Speaker of the People's Assembly before	Speaker of the People's Assembly after
Valeri Bganba; Independent	Valery Kvarchia; Independent

Parliamentary elections were held in Abkhazia in the spring of 2017. The first round was held on 12 March and a runoff held on 26 March. Voters elected the 6th convocation of the People's Assembly.

== Campaign ==
27 out of 33 incumbent deputies were standing for re-election. Among the candidates was former President Alexander Ankvab, who was ousted in the 2014 revolution. Ankvab was nominated by initiative groups in three different constituencies, but decided to run in constituency 18 (Gudauta).

== First round ==
Twelve candidates were elected in the first round of the elections, with 22 constituencies going to a second round. The first round was re-run in one constituency (17, Gudauta 1).

Constituency	Winning candidate	Votes	%	Total votes	Registered voters	Turnout
2	Almas Japua	1,095	56.27	1,946	5,606	34.71
10	Yury Khagush	1,745	60.55	2,882	5,321	54.16
11	Astamur Arshba	1,391	59.44	2,340	4,803	48.72
14	Dmitry Dbar	1,043	53.51	1,949	3,288	59.28
15	Dmitry Ardzinba	1,343	52.69	2,549	3,735	68.25
16	Mikhail Sangulia	1,094	65.71	1,665	3,814	43.65
18	Aleksandr Ankvab	1,028	52.26	1,967	3,573	55.05
22	Levon Galustyan	1,012	62.32	1,624	3,393	47.86
24	Ashot Minosyan	1,281	60.28	2,125	3,496	60.78
25	Said Kharazia	1,277	52.08	2,452	5,099	48.09
29	Astamur Tarba	1,075	56.28	1,910	2,623	72.82
30	Batal Tabagua	927	53.49	1,733	2,581	67.14
Source: Apsnypress

== Second round ==
22 seats were contested in the second round.

Constituency	Winning candidate
1	Givi Kvarchia
3	Valery Agrba
4	Batal Ayba
5	Lasha Ashuba
6	Raul Lolua
7	Alkhas Jinjolia
8	Akhra Abukhba
9	Beslan Smyr
12	Aleksandr Tsishba
13	Levon Dashan
19	Dmitry Gunba
20	Natali Smyr
21	Almaskhan Ardzinba
23	Valery Kvarchia
26	Ilya Gunia
27	Venori Bebia
28	Astamur Logua
31	Aslan Bzhania
32	Inal Tarba
33	Tayfun Ardzinba
34	Omar Jinjolia
35	Kakha Pertaia

=== Later Election ===
A re-voting was held in the constituency 17 of Gudauta District, on 14 May.

Constituency	Winning candidate
17	Leonid Chamagua
