= Albert Briand =

French politician (1909–1966)

- Born: 5 August 1909; Saint-Pierre, Saint Pierre and Miquelon
- Died: 29 May 1966 (aged 56); Saint-Pierre, Saint Pierre and Miquelon

Albert Briand (5 August 1909 - 29 May 1966) was a French merchant and politician.

== Family ==
Briand is the brother-in-law of senator Henri Claireaux.

== Biography ==
He edited the weekly publication L'Écho des îles Saint-Pierre-et-Miquelon ("The Echo of the islands of Saint-Pierre and Miquelon").

With his brother-in-law Henri, he was a part of the collaborationist elite of Saint-Pierre, causing them both to be arrested in January 1944. Despite both being fervent anti-Gaullists, they became political adversaries.
