= Victor Reux =

Victor Reux (December 3, 1929 – June 3, 2016) was a French and Saint Pierre and Miquelon politician and teacher. After working as a teacher and municipal councillor. He served in the French Senate, representing the overseas collectivity of Saint Pierre and Miquelon, for nine years from 1995, until standing down in 2004.

== Early life and career ==
Reux was born on December 3, 1929 in Saint Pierre and Miquelon. He worked as a teacher in Saint-Pierre from 1951 and taught the island's first 10th-grade class in 1963. In 1979 he was appointed to the French Commission to the United Nations Educational, Scientific and Cultural Organization, remaining in that role until 1985. He was also secretary of the Economic and Social Council of Saint Pierre and Miquelon from 1980 to 1995.

== Politics ==
Reux entered politics in the early 1980s. During his political career, Reux served as a local municipal councilor in Saint-Pierre from 1983 to 1989, and was a member of the departmental council of Saint Pierre and Miquelon from 1994 to 2000, representing Saint-Pierre. He was also a member of the l’assemblée des parlementaires de la Francophonie and the France-Canada Friendship Group.

In 1987 he was appointed to the French Economic, Social and Environmental Council in Paris, to represent the overseas departments and territories. He became the body's secretary in 1994 and left it the following year.

On September 24, 1995 Reux unexpectedly won a seat in the French Senate. After the first round of the election ended in a tie between Albert Pen and Bernard Le Soavec, Reux was selected to replace Soavec as a right-leaning candidate and won 20 of the 38 votes in the second round. In the senate Reux was a member of the Rally for the Republic party and sat on its political committee from 1998 to 2002 when he joined the Union for a Popular Movement. He also sat on the Senate's Committee on Cultural Affairs.

Reux spoke often in the senate on the economic difficulties faced by his constituents and its fishing industry. He promoted the exploration for oil in the territory and advocated for subsidised air services. Reux chose to stand down from the senate on September 26, 2004.

Reux was appointed a chevalier of the Legion of Honour and was an officer of the Ordre des Palmes académiques. He died on June 3, 2016, at the age of 86 in Saint-Pierre.
