= Karine Claireaux =

French politician from Saint Pierre and Miquelon

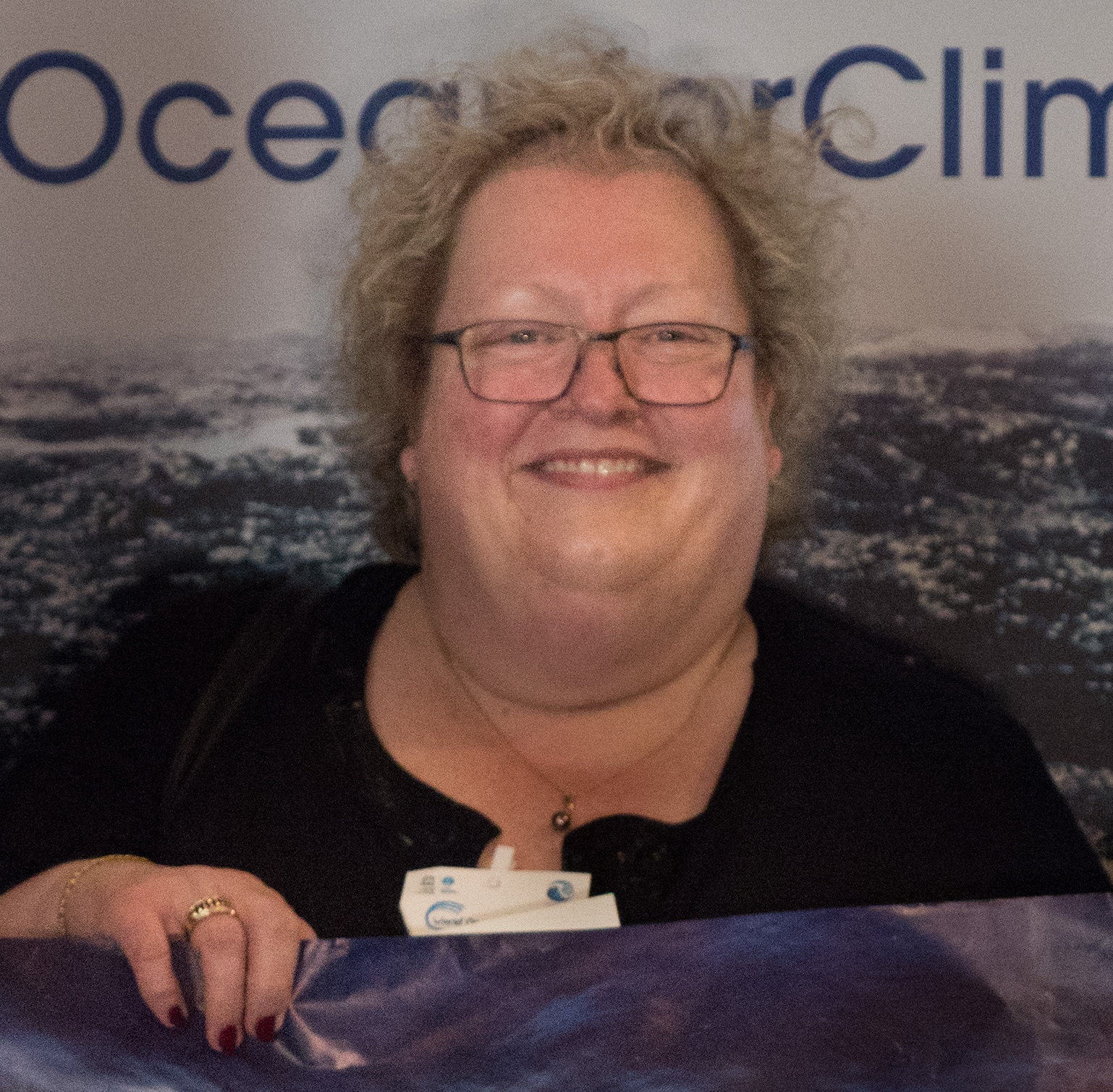
- Karine Claireaux

Senator for Saint Pierre and Miquelon
- In office 25 September 2011 – 1 October 2017
- Preceded by: Denis Detcheverry
- Succeeded by: Stéphane Artano

Mayor of Saint-Pierre, Saint Pierre and Miquelon
- In office 18 March 2001 – 15 March 2020
- Succeeded by: Yannick Cambray

Personal details
- Born: 15 November 1963 (age 62)
- Party: Socialist Party (France) (2011–2017); Rally of Democrats, Progressive and Independent group (2017); Ensemble pour construire (2006–2020)
- Occupation: Customs Officer

Karine Claireaux (born 15 November 1963) is a French politician from Saint Pierre and Miquelon. She was mayor of Saint-Pierre from 2001 to 2020 and a member of the Senate of France for Saint Pierre and Miquelon from 2011 to 2017. She is the founder of the political group Ensemble pour construire.

== Career ==
Claireaux was a customs officer from 1981 until 2000.

Her work in politics began in 1983 when she joined the municipal council of Saint-Pierre. She was deputy mayor of Saint-Pierre from 1989 to 2001, when she became mayor.

From 2000 to 2006, she was vice-president of the Territorial Council of Saint Pierre and Miquelon. In 2006, she founded the political group Ensemble pour construire. She was also elected chair of the Conseil National de la Mer et des Littoraux in 2014; she was re-elected in 2016 and was succeeded in 2021 by Sophie Panonacle.

On 25 September 2011, she was elected senator by the electors of Saint Pierre and Miquelon in the first round. She was part of the Socialist Party from 2011 to 2017, when she joined the Rally of Democrats, Progressive and Independent group. She was defeated in the 2017 senatorial elections by Stéphane Artano.

Claireaux was not re-elected in the Saint-Pierre municipal elections in 2020, and she was succeeded by Yannick Cambray of the Cap sur l'avenir list after 19 years in office.

== Political views ==
Claireaux identifies as left-wing.

She supported merging the communes of Saint-Pierre and Miquelon-Langlade into one entity, and expressed regret she had not achieved this in her work as mayor. In an interview with the CBC on the occasion of the 2017 French presidential election, she expressed strong opposition to presidential candidate Marine Le Pen, stating she would "bring nothing to the territory", and criticised those who cast blank votes.

== Bibliography ==
- Page on the French Senate website
