= Denis Detcheverry =

French politician (born 1953)

- Born: April 29, 1953; Miquelon-Langlade (French overseas collectivity of Saint Pierre and Miquelon)
- Died: January 24, 2026 (aged 72); Saint-Pierre (French overseas collectivity of Saint Pierre and Miquelon)
- Occupation: French politician

Denis Detcheverry (29 April 1953 – 24 January 2026) was a member of the Senate of France from 2004 to 2011, representing the islands of Saint Pierre and Miquelon. He was a member of the Union for a Popular Movement.

== Life ==
Detcheverry was an employee of a public training organization and an agent of Électricité de France and served as mayor of Miquelon-Langlade from 1989 to 1995 and from 2001 to 2008, and subsequently as deputy mayor from 2008 to 2014.

He was elected Senator for Saint-Pierre and Miquelon in 2004. He sat with the Republicans until 2010, when he joined the Democratic and Social Rally group (RDSE). In the Senate, he served on the Committee on Economic Affairs, Sustainable Development, and Regional Planning; the Steering Committee of the Fund for Employment in the Overseas Departments and the Territorial Collectivity of Saint-Pierre and Miquelon; and the Commission for the Evaluation of Overseas Tax Exemption and Social Security Contribution Waiver Schemes. He was also entrusted with a temporary mission for the Minister of Overseas Territories. In this capacity, he was a member of the French section of the Francophonie Parliamentary Assembly.

He was defeated in the first round of the Senate elections in September 2011 by Karine Claireaux.

He died on January 24, 2026.
