= Territorial Council of Saint Pierre and Miquelon =

Legislative branch of the islands of Saint Pierre and Miquelon

Territorial Council of Saint Pierre and Miquelon (en) Conseil territorial de Saint-Pierre-et-Miquelon (fr)

Type
- Type: Unicameral

Structure
- Seats: 19 members
- Political groups: Archipelago Tomorrow (LR) (15); Focus on the Future (PRG) (4)

Elections
- Last election: 20 March 2022

Meeting place
- Church Square, Saint-Pierre

The Territorial Council (French: Conseil territorial) is the legislative branch of the government of the French territory of Saint Pierre and Miquelon. It was previously known as the General Council (French: Conseil général), but the name was changed to Territorial Council by a new French law on 22 February 2007, a law which also increased the council's powers. The council has 19 members, elected to five year terms. The last election was on 20 March 2022.

The Territorial Council building is a two-story structure located at Church Square in Saint-Pierre.

== Organisation ==
The Territorial Council has 19 members, elected for a six-year term in single-seat constituencies. Elections are held in two stages. The first stage is open to all candidates and the majority of seats can only be given out if a political group achieves true majority at the ballot box. If no majority is attained on this ballot, a second ballot is held the following Sunday. On the second ballot, only a relative majority is necessary to obtain 11 out of the 19 seats. The rest of the seats (four reserved for Miquelon) are distributed through a system of proportional representation.

=== President ===
The president of the Territorial Council has held executive power since March 2, 1982. The current president is Bernard Briand.

A list of presidents of the Territorial Council (General Council before February 2007):

- Jan 1947 – Feb 1952 Henri Dagort
- Feb 1952 – Nov 1956 Alfred-Léon Briand
- Nov 1956 – Nov 1964 Henri Claireaux
- Nov 1964 – Oct 1966 Albert Briand
- Oct 1966 – Jun 1968 Paul Lebailly
- Jun 1968 – 4 Oct 1984 Albert Pen
- 4 Oct 1984 – 1 Apr 1994 Marc Plantegenest
- 1 Apr 1994 – 6 Jul 1996 Gérard Grignon
- 6 Jul 1996 – 31 Mar 2000 Bernard Le Soavec
- 31 Mar 2000 – 27 Dec 2005 Marc Plantegenest
- 27 Dec 2005 – 27 Jan 2006 Paul Jaccachury
- 27 Jan 2006 – 31 Mar 2006 Charles Dodeman
- 31 Mar 2006 – 24 Oct 2017 Stéphane Artano
- 24 Oct 2017 – 13 Oct 2020 Stéphane Lenormand
- 13 Oct 2020 – current Bernard Briand

=== Territorial Council Members ===
The Territorial Council members consist of five vice-presidents, officers of the council and general members.

The current standing at the council are:

- First Vice President (Premier Vice-Président) - Jean-Yves Desdouets
- Second Vice President (Deuxième Vice-Présidente) - Catherine Hélène
- Third Vice President (Troisième Vice-Président) - Olivier Detcheverry
- Fourth Vice President (Quatrième Vice-Présidente) - Catherine De Arburn
- Fifth Vice President (Cinquième Vice-Président) - Claude Lemoine

=== Majority Territorial Council Members ===
- Stéphane Artano
- Joane Beaupertuis
- Sandy Skinner
- Stéphane Lenormand
- Jean-Pierre Lebailly
- Valérie Perrin
- Jean-Louis Dagort
- Carole Sérignat
- Virginie Sabarots
- Michel Detcheverry
- Claire Vigneaux

=== Opposition Territorial Council Members ===
- Matthew Reardon
- Tatiana Vigneau-Urtizbéréa

== See also ==
- Municipal governments in Saint Pierre and Miquelon
- Territorial Council of Saint Barthélemy
