= Stéphane Lenormand =

French politician

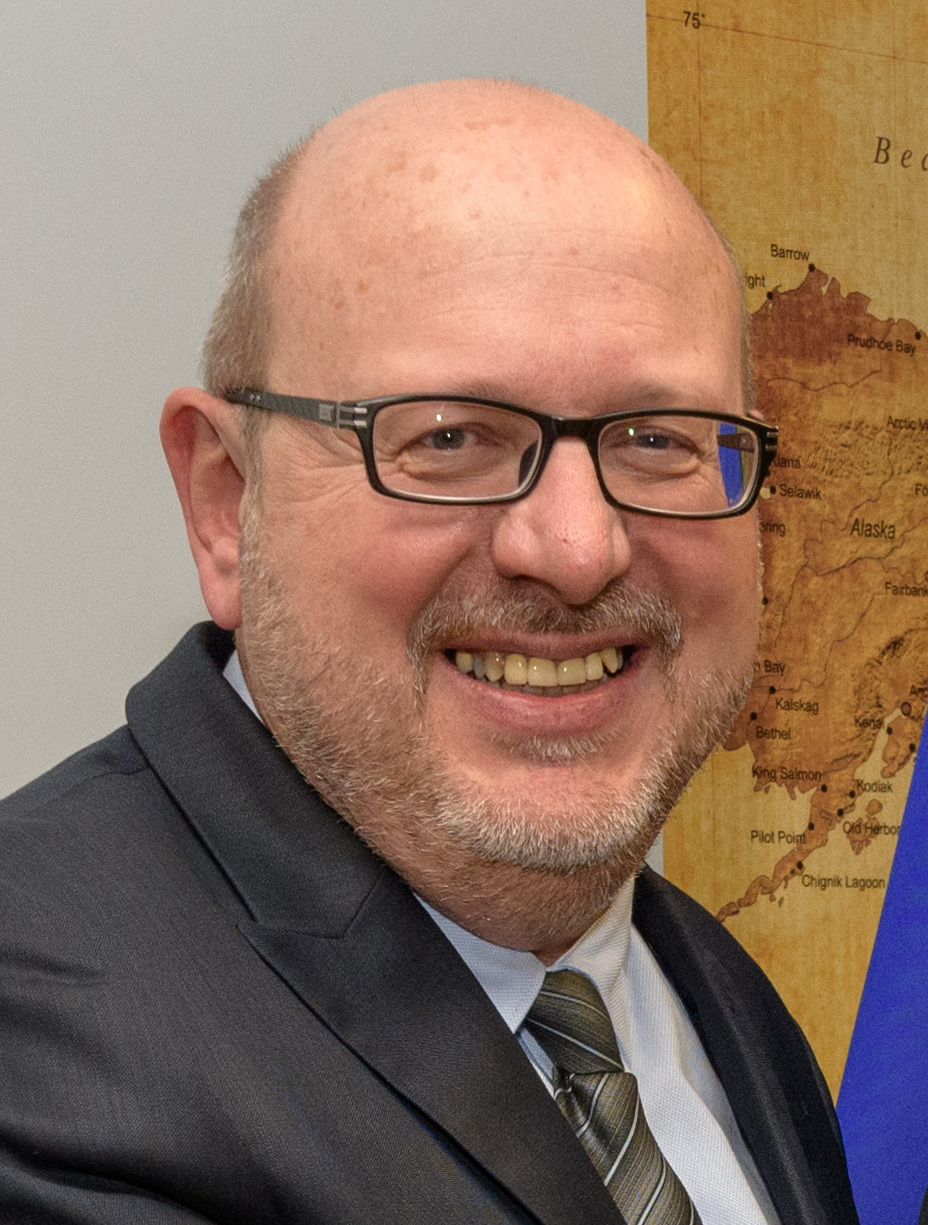
Stéphane Lenormand in 2017

Stéphane Lenormand (French pronunciation: [stefan lənɔʁmɑ̃]) is a French politician from Saint Pierre and Miquelon. He is a member of Archipelago Tomorrow and was President of the Territorial Council of Saint Pierre and Miquelon from 2017 to 2020. Lenormand was elected to the National Assembly of France in 2022.

== Electoral history ==
For legislative elections to the French Parliament, he contested Saint-Pierre-et-Miquelon's 1st constituency in both 2017 and 2022.
