= Archipelago Tomorrow =

Archipelago Tomorrow Archipel Demain
- Founded: 24 January 1985
- Ideology: Christian democracy Liberal conservatism
- Political position: Centre-right to right-wing
- National affiliation: The Republicans
- French National Assembly: 1 / 577
- Territorial Council: 15 / 19

Website
- www.archipeldemain.com

Archipelago Tomorrow (French: Archipel Demain [aʁʃipɛl dəmɛ̃]) is a centre-right political movement in the French overseas collectivity of Saint Pierre and Miquelon.

== See also ==
- Catherine Hélène
- Stéphane Lenormand
