= History of Saint Pierre and Miquelon =

The history of Saint Pierre and Miquelon is one of early settlement by Europeans taking advantage of the rich fishing grounds near Saint-Pierre and Miquelon, and is characterized by periods of conflict between the French and British.

There is evidence of prehistoric native inhabitants on the islands, but there is no record of native inhabitants at the time of European exploration. Europeans began to regularly visit from the early 16th century and their settlements are some of the oldest in the Americas. At first, Basque fishermen only visited the islands seasonally during the fishing season, but by the mid-17th century, permanent French residences existed on the islands.

From the end of the 17th century, English attacks led to the island's French settlers abandoning Saint Pierre and Miquelon, and the British took possession from 1713 to 1763. France eventually reclaimed them, and French settlers returned to live peacefully for 15 years. France joining the American Revolutionary War against Britain led to a British attack and the deportation of the French settlers. Possession of Saint Pierre and Miquelon passed back and forth between France and Great Britain for the next 38 years, as the islands experienced continued invasions from both countries, voluntary or forced removal of the island's residents, and upheaval associated with the French Revolution.

France finally reclaimed the islands after Napoleon's second abdication in 1815, and there followed 70 years of prosperity for the French fishing industry and residents. However, political and economic changes led to a slow decline of the fishing industry after the late 19th century. There was a short 13-year economic boom on the island associated with the period of Prohibition in the United States, when Saint Pierre and Miquelon were prominent bases for alcohol smuggling. This boom ended with the end of Prohibition in 1933, and the economy sank into depression.

The islands were an overseas territory of the Nazi-controlled regime of Vichy France after the fall of France in World War II, and were liberated a year and a half later by Free French forces in 1941. After the war, the fishing industry continued to languish, and now fish stocks have fallen so low that fishing is severely restricted. Saint Pierre and Miquelon are now trying to diversify their economy into tourism and other areas.

== Prehistory ==
Beothuk and Paleoeskimo or Dorset culture artifacts have been uncovered on the island Saint-Pierre at Anse à Henry, north of the town of Saint-Pierre.

The Beothuk painted themselves with red ochre, which was the origin of the term "Red Indian". The Beothuk did not survive long after their first encounters with Europeans.

The Dorset culture preceded the Inuit or Thule people, and the last remaining Dorset culture tribes were destroyed by diseases when they encountered Europeans.

Some of the native artifacts found on the islands of Saint Pierre and Miquelon date back to 6000 BC. There is no record of native habitation of Saint Pierre and Miquelon by the time that Europeans arrived.

The Mi'kmaq, a group indigenous to Newfoundland and Canada's Maritime provinces, use the terms "Senpir" for the island of Saint-Pierre, "Mikliin" for the island of Miquelon, and "Wen'juikjikan" for the capital, Saint-Pierre.

== Exploration ==
The first map that showed Saint Pierre and Miquelon was the Mappa mundi of 1500 created by Juan de la Cosa, where they were labelled 'Illa de la Trenidat'. There are some who argue that the 'Green Islands' encountered during the two pre-1472 Portuguese expeditions under João Vaz Corte-Real and the 1501 Portuguese expedition under his son Gaspar Corte-Real were St. Pierre and the islands near it. A map drawn by Johannes Ruysch published in 1507 depicts Miquelon, St. Pierre and the surrounding islands, and labelled as Barbatos.

Portuguese explorer João Álvares Fagundes, on 21 October 1520, visited the islands named the St. Pierre island group the 'Eleven Thousand Virgins', as the day marked the feast day of St. Ursula and her virgin companions. Jacques Cartier of France referred to Saint Pierre and Miquelon and the neighboring islands as the 'Islands of Saint-Pierre' in a written report after his visit in 1536. This was the earliest known written reference to the name 'Saint-Pierre'.

Alonzo de Santa Cruz wrote that the islands of the 'Eleven Thousand Virgins' were the destination of many fishermen from Ireland and Brittany in 1541. The Islario of Jean Alphonse, a French geographer, which was published in 1544, described St. Pierre and the nearby islands. The first use of the name 'Miquelon' for the large western island in the St. Pierre island group appears in Les voyages aventureux du Capitaine Martin de Hoyarsal, habitant du çubiburu a reference book for sailors known as a "navigational pilot", written by Basque seaman Martin de Hoyarçabal in 1579.

== Early European settlement ==
During the 16th century, the islands were used as a base for the seasonal cod fishery by the French of La Rochelle, Granville, Saint-Malo and the Basque Country. When French explorer Jacques Cartier was in Saint-Pierre in 1536 he made note of the French and Breton fishery, writing:

Nous fumes ausdictes yles sainct Pierre, ou trouvasmes plusieurs navires, tant de France que de Bretaigne, depuis le jour sainct Bernabe, XIe de juing, jusques au XVIe jour dudict moys

that is,

We stayed to the so-called Saint-Pierre islands where we found several French and Breton ships, from St. Barnabe's day, 11 June, until 16th day of said month.

By this time, Basque, Breton and Norman fishermen had been fishing in the waters off these islands for over 30 years. The name Miquelon is of Basque origin as this island was used by fishermen from Saint-Jean de Luz.

The first written evidence of year-round residents on the islands was in a report in 1670 by the first intendant of New France, Jean Talon, who recorded the presence of thirteen fishermen and four settled residents. By 1687, there were three families living on the islands. Saint-Pierre supplied many of the neighboring French fishing communities, such as those in Fortune Bay and Hermitage Bay. During King William's War, from 1689 to 1697, and Queen Anne's War, from 1702 to 1712, there were at least five English attacks against French colonial settlements on the islands. This led to the abandonment of the islands by many of the French settlers by 1708. The Treaty of Utrecht of 1713 brought such wars to an end, and France ceded possession of Saint Pierre and Miquelon, as well as Newfoundland, to Great Britain.

== British possession ==
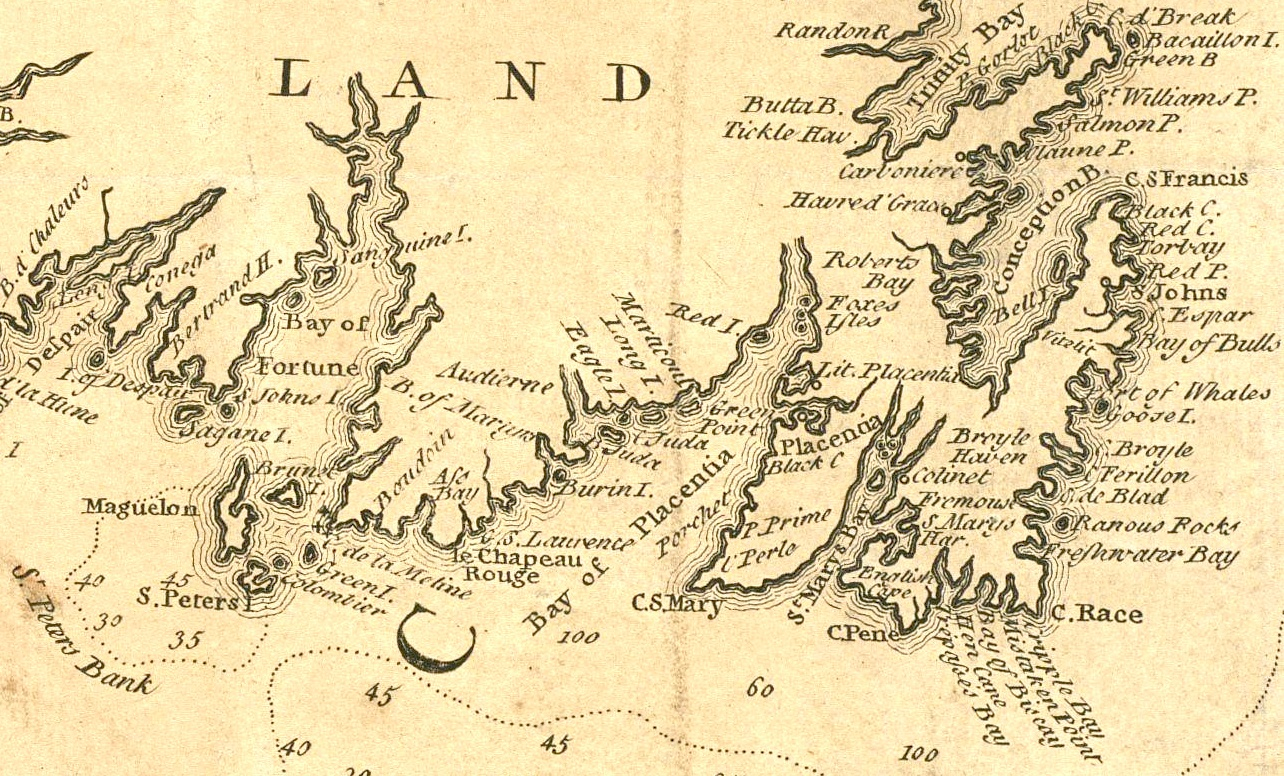
Excerpt from a 1746 English copy of a map originally prepared by Jaques Nicolas Bellin in Paris in 1744; showing "St. Peter's", Miquelon, Grand Colombier islands, and the "St. Peter's Bank" off the Burin Peninsula of Newfoundland.

After they took control of the islands in 1713, the British changed the name of Saint Pierre to Saint Peter's. The British government commissioned two surveys of their new possessions between 1714 and 1716. A Newfoundland planter and merchant, William Taverner, surveyed the region west of Placentia Bay for the British Board of Trade. The British Admiralty asked Lieutenant John Gaudy to conduct a cartographic survey of the area in 1716.

Some of the French settlers remained, and for a while ships from Saint-Malo continued to visit the islands. However, this trade was illegal and eventually ceased. Slowly British and Anglo-American merchants and settlers started to move to the islands. In 1722, the island of Miquelon was sold to Capt. Diamond Sarjeant, a Massachusetts resident, who sold 2/3 of Miquelon to Samuel Cutt of New Hampshire in 1756, and sold the remaining 1/3 of Miquelon to Robert Trail of Portsmouth, New Hampshire in 1758.

In the summer of 1763, after Britain had agreed to return the islands to French possession, James Cook mapped the islands of Saint Pierre and Miquelon. Cook wrote that:

The Island is as subject to Fogs as any part in Newfoundland yes if we may credit the late Planters it is very convenient for catching and curing of Codfish.

== Return to France ==
By the end of the Seven Years' War in 1763, France had lost a good fraction of its North American empire. However, two of the provisions of the 1713 Treaty of Utrecht were that France would be granted fishing rights in the waters around Saint Pierre and Miquelon, and provided a refuge or "abri" for the fishermen. France asked that these provisions of the Treaty of Utrecht be honored, and Britain agreed to this during the Treaty of Paris negotiations. Britain therefore returned Saint Pierre and Miquelon to France in 1763, and allowed visiting French fishermen to come ashore in Newfoundland to dry their catch.

Between 1763 and 1778, the islands became a place of refuge for Acadian deportees from Nova Scotia. Several of the Acadians who were given the status of refugees were rich shipowners. Although the Acadians tried to farm the islands, these efforts were mostly unsuccessful and they had to rely more on fishing, and on offering fish-drying and other services to visiting French fishing fleets (principally from Saint-Malo). The French government made the determination in 1767 that the islands were too small and too poor for the Acadians. France moved the Acadians back to France, settling them in the ports of Brest, Saint-Malo, Lorient and Dunkirk. In 1768, the French government changed its mind and sent the Acadians back to Saint-Pierre and Miquelon.

Trade grew between New England and Saint Pierre and Miquelon for a short period while St. Pierre was rebuilding and lumber was needed. Trade also increased with the Newfoundland mainland for various goods. The Newfoundland community of Placentia Bay had a large fraction of Irish settlers, many of whom were Roman Catholic, which was illegal in Newfoundland until 1784. The Irish Catholics from Placentia Bay would travel to St. Pierre to have their weddings and baptisms performed by Catholic priests. Although the British tried to discourage the trade and contacts between Newfoundland and the islands, they were not successful.

== Attacks and deportations ==
In 1778 the islands were attacked by a force led by Newfoundland's Governor John Montagu and the colonists deported by Montagu's men after France joined the American Revolutionary War on the side of the United States. The settlers were sent back to France and their colonial settlements were burnt. France regained the islands in 1783 after the Peace of Paris and some residents returned to the islands.

The French Revolution erupted in 1789, and events on Saint Pierre and Miquelon were not immune to the events that ensued. In the early spring of 1793, news of the trial and execution of Louis XVI reached the islands. All royal symbols were subsequently removed from Saint Pierre and Miquelon. The Acadian population of Miquelon were loyal to French royalty, and decided to leave the colony for the Magdalen Islands, a small archipelago just north of Nova Scotia.

In May 1793, after France had declared war on Great Britain as part of the War of the First Coalition, a British force attacked the islands under Captain William Affleck of Halifax. The seasonal fishermen and captured French military personnel were deported in 1793, followed by the 950 residents in 1794, who were shipped to Halifax and held for two years.

British fishermen took possession of the islands. Only 2 years later, French forces under Rear-Admiral de Richery attacked the islands in 1796, sinking 80 British vessels. The British abandoned the islands, and the French destroyed the town. After this, the islands remained deserted until 1816.

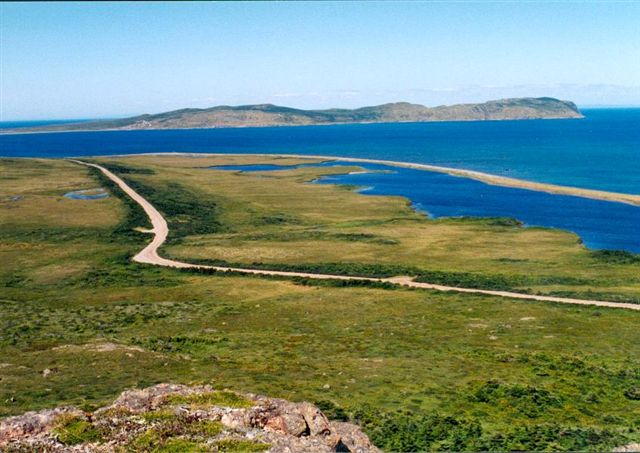
The Island of Miquelon

== French restoration after Napoleon ==
Although the Amiens Treaty of 1802 specified that Saint-Pierre and Miquelon would again be returned to France, this agreement did not produce the promised restoration. The islands were finally returned to France after the second abdication of Napoleon in 1815. French fishermen again took up residence on the island in 1816.

The French fishing fleet again came to the islands for supplies and to dry and cure their catch. The residents of the islands did a good business, many working as armateurs, or outfitters, for the visiting fishing fleet. About 200 French vessels came to fish in the waters, and as many as 8000 French fishermen came to visit every year from St. Malo, Fécamp, Saint-Brieuc, and Dieppe. The catch was divided into dried "saltfish" for the Caribbean and much of Europe and "wet-cured" fish for the French market. This enterprise was supported by a vigorous trade with Newfoundland for bait and other goods.

Although there were three large fires in St. Pierre, the islands prospered. A post office was created in 1854, a bank in 1889 ("Banque des Îles") and in 1866 the island administration began a newspaper, Feuille Officielle.

The shore areas of Newfoundland were increasingly frequented by French fishermen for drying their catch. Although the British had intended that the French not erect any permanent structures or live on Newfoundland, the terms of the treaty were ambiguous. French settlements sprung up on the northern coast of Newfoundland, which came to be known as the French Shore, as well on the southern and western coasts.

== Changing times ==
The increasing French presence on the French Shore led to tension between the French and British inhabitants, and extensive negotiations between France and Britain. These negotiations resulted in a convention in 1857 in which Britain agreed to allow French settlements on the French Shore and eventually their exclusive use of this territory. The Newfoundland legislature reacted very negatively to this agreement, and Britain reconsidered. France abandoned its rights as part of the Entente Cordiale agreement of 1904. One of the aggressive actions taken by Newfoundland was the passage of the Bait Act in 1887. This reduced the amount of bait available to fishermen on Saint Pierre and Miquelon. Also, the market for "saltfish" peaked in 1886 and went into decline. The introduction of steamships meant that fishing vessels were able to return to France with their catch without stopping at Saint Pierre and Miquelon for supplies. These all hurt the economy on Saint Pierre and Miquelon.

Submarine trans-Atlantic telegraph cables from France in the 19th century typically were routed from the French mainland through stations on Miquelon or St. Pierre, and then on to Nova Scotia or the United States. The first was laid in 1869 from the lighthouse at Le Minou on the north side of the entrance to the narrows leading to the Brest harbor in France to St. Pierre, and then on to Duxbury, Massachusetts. Of the 12 French trans-Atlantic submarine telegraph cables laid between 1869 and 1897, 6 of them passed through Miquelon or St. Pierre. The islands were becoming more closely connected to the outside world.

In 1903, American Senator Henry Cabot Lodge advocated that the United States should purchase the islands from France. Lodge was concerned about the French influence on Saint Pierre and Miquelon, possible political or cultural effects on Canada and the United States, and the effect of French fishing fleets on New England fisheries. The economy of the islands had been in decline due to poor cod fishing seasons, and many residents were angry at France for insisting on approving all teachers on the islands. For these reasons, many residents of the islands were in favor of becoming part of the United States, reasoning that they could then sell their fish to the rest of the United States without import taxes, and that the United States would not interfere with their local educational system. In response, some Canadians asked Great Britain to purchase the islands from France instead. In an election for the islands' representative to the French Chamber of Deputies, one candidate was in favor of annexation while the incumbent candidate was not. The incumbent candidate, who was against annexation, won reelection by a small margin in December 1903. The islands were not purchased by either country, and they remained part of France.

The French fishery of Saint Pierre and Miquelon was in severe decline by this time, and its end was hastened by an agreement between Britain and France in 1904 over territorial issues, in which France traded their exclusive right to fishing in Newfoundland waters for compensation and considerations in Africa.

Companies merged, and many of the residents left for greener pastures, as the economy withered to one-third of its previous size by 1914. The First World War resulted in disruptions of supplies from France between 1914 and 1918, and the death of over 100 residents in the trenches of Europe.

== Windfall from Prohibition ==
In 1920, the US passed the Eighteenth Amendment to the United States Constitution which led to Prohibition. As a result, St. Pierre and Miquelon became the transshipment point for bringing illegal alcohol from Canada into the United States. Some Canadian provinces also experimented with prohibition as well, but alcohol manufacturers in Canada were still allowed to distil liquor for export. A French law forbidding the importation of foreign liquor was repealed in 1922, drastically increasing the alcohol smuggling operations. Canadian whisky, Caribbean rum and legally imported French wines and spirits were the main products smuggled into and then reshipped from the islands.

During the US Prohibition period, many gangsters including Al Capone and Bill McCoy set up operations in the islands, using them as a base to smuggle alcohol into the US. Fishermen and armateurs gave up their regular jobs to unload alcohol from Canada, Europe and Bermuda and store it in warehouses. A new fish processing plant was converted into a warehouse. Additionally, distilleries were set up on the islands. This economic boom lasted until the end of Prohibition in 1933, and was known locally as "Les Temps de la Fraude". As quickly as it began, the boom collapsed when Prohibition was repealed, leaving a depressed local economy.

Local legend holds that Capone regularly visited Saint-Pierre, and a local bar displays a hat alleged to have been his.

== World War II ==
France was defeated in 1940 by Nazi Germany, and Northern France was occupied. Southern France was governed by Vichy France, which collaborated with Germany. Vichy France was nevertheless recognized as the legitimate government of France by neutral countries, including the United States.

Governor Gilbert de Bournat of St. Pierre adhered to Vichy France, but the islands were in a difficult situation. The islands were dependent on France for subsidies; it is estimated that in the first part of the 20th century, France spent 40 million francs supporting the economy of the islands. Also, a substantial fraction of the French fishing fleet decided not to return to Nazi-controlled France and remained in the harbor of St. Pierre. French General Charles de Gaulle created Free France, which was supported by Britain. Also, the UK and US worried that Saint Pierre and Miquelon under Vichy control could be used by the Axis to spy on Allied shipping, since there was a radio transmitter on St. Pierre that was thought to be sending messages to German submarines.

During the early years of World War II, the United States maintained formal relations with Vichy France. Under the Monroe Doctrine, the US was strongly opposed to any change in control of the islands by force. However, Canada (perhaps due to pressure from Winston Churchill) expressed worries about Vichy forces near Canada. De Gaulle realized that Canada might want to capture Saint Pierre and Miquelon (thereby eliminating French territory so close to Quebec), so he secretly planned its seizure by Free France. On Christmas Eve 1941, Free French forces (three corvettes and the submarine Surcouf, led by Rear-Admiral Émile Muselier) "invaded" the islands. The Vichy officials immediately surrendered.

It became a major international incident, because the use of military force by Free France was contrary to the Monroe Doctrine and because the United States had just reached an agreement with Vichy France not to disturb its possessions in the Western Hemisphere. US President Franklin D. Roosevelt and Churchill were incensed to learn that de Gaulle had ordered the landings without even consulting them. The United States and Canada both threatened armed intervention, despite Free France being an ally of both countries. However, US Secretary of State Cordell Hull then disclaimed any further US interest in the islands, and the islands were not critical to any Allied country.

The Free French corvette Mimosa, crewed mainly from St. Pierre and Miquelon, escorted Allied convoys. On 9 June 1942, while escorting Convoy ONS 100, she was torpedoed and sunk by German submarine U-124. Losses were heavy. The French Commander Roger Birot was killed, as were 58 French and 6 British sailors. Only four French sailors were saved by the Canadian destroyer HMCS Assiniboine.

== Since World War II ==
At the end of the Second World War in 1945, Saint Pierre and Miquelon resumed its place as a center for codfishing. Other nations joined the French fleet to fish in the waters around the islands. The economy was not as prosperous as it had been, and by the 1960s French government subsidies constituted half the budget of the islands. This led to the reputation of the island residents as being "the world's most expensive Frenchmen".

In the late 1950s De Gaulle offered all French colonies political and financial independence. Saint Pierre and Miquelon chose to remain part of France.

A political leadership crisis in Saint Pierre and Miquelon erupted in 1965. France sent in an armed force of gardes mobiles. In response, the residents of Saint Pierre and Miquelon mounted a three-day general strike in protest of this interference in local affairs.

The islands became a full département d'outre mer of France in 1976. This status was modified in 1985 and the islands became a territory with special status (collectivité territoriale à statut particulier) under pressure from the United States. After the constitutional reform of 2003, it became a collectivité d'outre-mer, while keeping its particular name of collectivité territoriale de Saint-Pierre-et-Miquelon.

Canada tried to reduce the codfishing around Newfoundland in the 1970s and 1980s, out of fear of seriously damaging the fish population. The French responded with the "Codfish Crusade" and fished in areas that were forbidden. The Canadian government inspected French fishing trawlers and jailed some fishermen. In 1994, France and Canada mutually agreed to reduce the fishing industry in Saint-Pierre and Miquelon.

To the consternation of law enforcement officials, there continues to be smuggling of alcohol and tobacco from Saint Pierre and Miquelon to Newfoundland. This illegal trade has a long history and tradition. It is partly driven by a depressed local economy.

At this point, Saint Pierre and Miquelon represent the sole remaining vestige of France's once vast North American possessions. They have always been most important as a fishing centre, being in easy travelling distance of the Grand Banks of Newfoundland, some of the world's richest fishing grounds. However, they are slowly diversifying their economy into tourism and other activities, with the assistance of the French government.

As a result of an agreement between the European Union and France, the Euro became the legal currency of the French overseas territories of French Guiana, Réunion, Saint Pierre and Miquelon, Guadeloupe, Martinique and Mayotte in 2002.

The COVID-19 disease outbreak has impacted Saint-Pierre and Miquelon in 2020-2023.
