= COVID-19 pandemic in French Guiana =

Ongoing COVID-19 viral pandemic in French Guiana, France

- Disease: COVID-19
- Pathogen: SARS-CoV-2
- Location: French Guiana
- First outbreak: France
- Index case: Saint-Laurent-du-Maroni
- Arrival date: 4 March 2020 (6 years, 6 months and 3 days)
- Confirmed cases: 98,041
- Recovered: 97,621
- Deaths: 420

Government website
- Préfet de la région Guyane

The COVID-19 pandemic was confirmed to have reached the French overseas department and region of French Guiana. The first five cases were found on 4 March and the first death was announced on 20 April 2020. On 30 April, the territory was green listed, because the pandemic appeared to be under control except for Saint-Georges. In June, the virus started circulating all over the territory.

As of 10 February 2023, a total of 240,930 vaccine doses have been administered.

== Background ==
On 12 January 2020, the World Health Organization (WHO) confirmed that a novel coronavirus was the cause of a respiratory illness in a cluster of people in Wuhan City, Hubei Province, China, which was reported to the WHO on 31 December 2019.

The case fatality ratio for COVID-19 has been much lower than SARS of 2003, but the transmission has been significantly greater, with a significant total death toll.

Even though French Guiana is a large territory, the population in 2020 was 297,449. The interior of French Guiana consists of rainforests with a tiny populations of mainly tribal indigenous people and maroons.

== Timeline ==
Cases

Deaths

=== March 2020 ===
On 4 March, French Guiana had five confirmed cases of COVID-19, all in Saint-Laurent du Maroni.

On 6 March, Guiana Space Center has suspended launch activities.

On 15 March, the following measures were announced by the President of the Republic: It is prohibited to leave the house except for essential journeys which includes: shopping for food, traveling to work, accessing healthcare, and exercising within 1 km of the household. Marc Del Grande, the Prefect of French Guiana, announced closing of borders with Suriname and Brazil, mandatory 14 day quarantine for people coming from abroad, and a curfew between 21:00 and 05:00.

On 22 March, all air travel for passengers were halted from midnight onwards.

On 24 March, Marie-Laure Phinera-Horth, the Mayor of Cayenne instituted a curfew from 20:00 to 05:00 unlike the rest of the region.

On 30 March, a member of the nursing staff at the Cayenne nursing home tested positive for COVID-19.

=== April 2020 ===
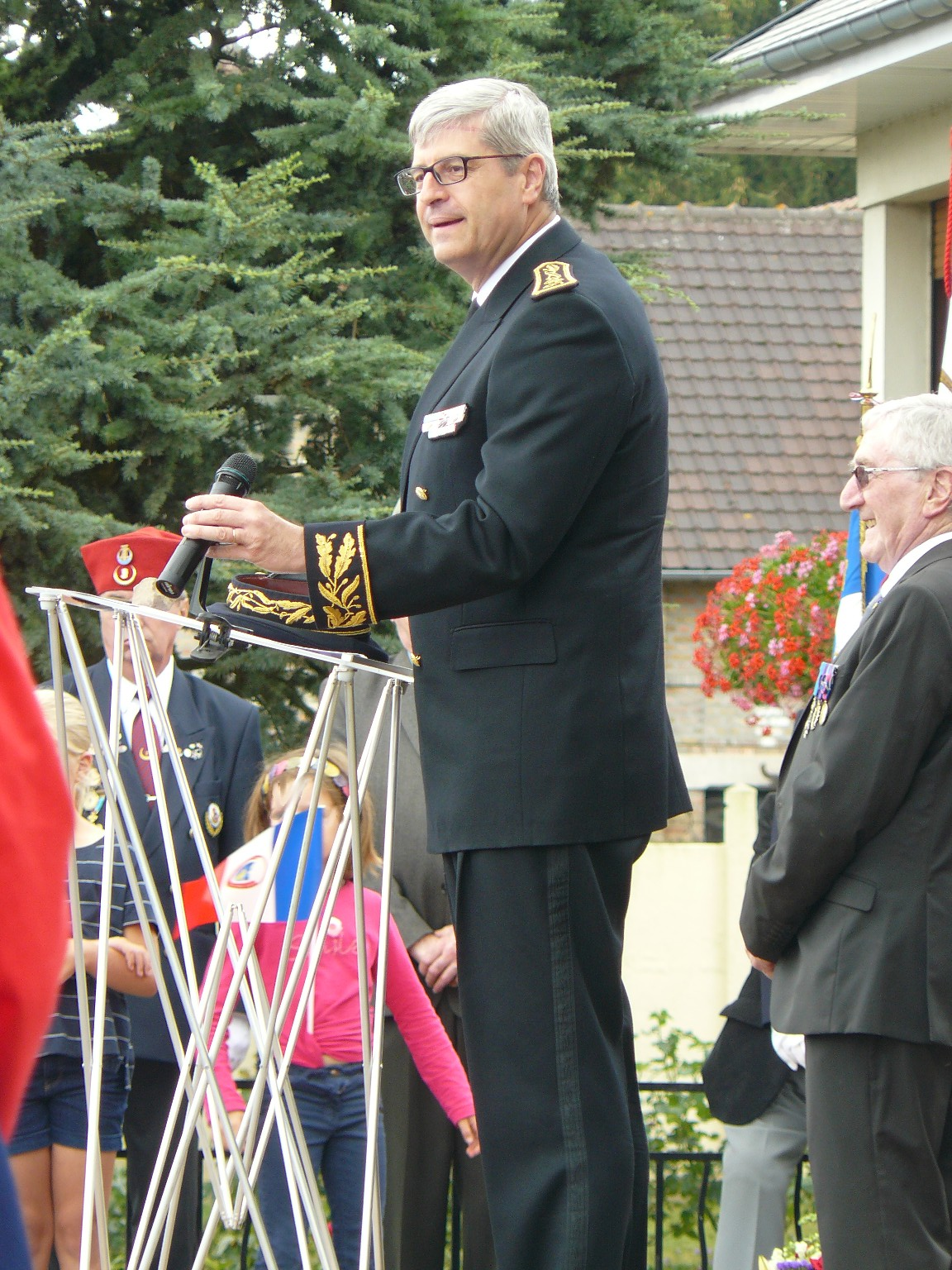
Marc Del Grande, Prefect of French-Guiana

On 4 April, a laboratory assistant from Andrée-Rosemon Hospital tested positive for COVID-19.

On 7 April, there were 77 cases and 34 recoveries. The districts affected are Saint-Laurent, Kourou, Cayenne and Maripasoula Groupe Bernard Hayot donated 1,300,000 masks for free to health works in Martinique, Gaudeloupe, Guiana, and Réunion

On 9 April, the European Union announced a grant of €8M (US$8.6M), which will be implemented by the Caribbean Public Health Agency, for the fight against the coronavirus. French Guiana is one of the 24 members of the CARPHA.
The Agence régionale de santé Guyane released a special report on the situation: 780 tests had been performed, 985 contacts had been traced, 42 cases were imported and 41 cases resulted from community spread.
A cluster of 13 cases had been located at the indigenous village Cécilia in Matoury. 13 out of 16 suspected cases tested positive. The Prefect ordered a confinement of the village. On 14 April, six more children from Cécilia tested positive; however were getting better. The confinement of Cécilia was lifted on 2 May, and the 300 inhabitants were able to resume normal activities.

On 10 April, the report of the Scientific Council on the Evolution of the Coronavirus in the Overseas Territories was released, calling for strict confinement and doubling of hospital capacity. ARS Guyane replied on 13 April that they would apply certain recommendations, but also stated that the number of ICU beds had been increased to 38 and was sufficient at moment, given that there were no current patients in the ICU.

On 11 April, France and Suriname announced joint efforts to prevent illegal crossings of the Maroni river separating Suriname and French Guiana, and established a contact point in Saint-Laurent-du-Maroni and Albina. On 13 April, the Prefect mobilized the army to guard the river for its entire length.

On 12 April, Dr. Hatem Kallel announced that the patient who had been in ICU since 2 April had been discharged. This marked no active patients in intensive care.

On 13 April, there were concerns about price gouging, however Gilles Klaus, Director of Carrefour Matoury, denied these allegations. On 15 April, a commitment charter for price moderation between the State and 21 essential companies was signed.

On 15 April, it was reported that following the outbreak in Cécilia, several indigenous villages mainly located in Matoury and Macouria voluntarily locked down.
Officials from French Guiana's local authorities voted to set up an emergency fund of €8.7 million in the form of 0-rate loans to help businesses. The opposition and tourism authority fear that this was not enough.

On 16 April, it was announced that 330 healthcare workers at Andrée Rosemon Hospital Center in Cayenne will be tested, because up to five staff members had tested positive.
According to the situation report of ARS, there were 42 imported cases and 54 cases of community spread. Only 6% of the cases are over 65. 20 people were in hospital and 3 were in ICU.

On 17 April, the Red Cross started a food parcel distribution operation in Saint-Laurent-du-Maroni.

On 20 April, the first death was announced. A 70-year-old man died the previous night at the Cayenne hospital. He died between 23:00 and 1:00.

On 21 April, Antoine Joly, the French ambassador to Suriname, revealed in an interview that the town of Saint-Laurent-du-Maroni had been shielded off from the rest of the region, and that most of the cases have been imported.
Hôtel Du Fleuve near the village of Sinnamary was requisitioned to be used for quarantine or COVID-19 patients. The hotel had become deserted after the Russian technicians from the Guianan Soyuz launch site returned home.

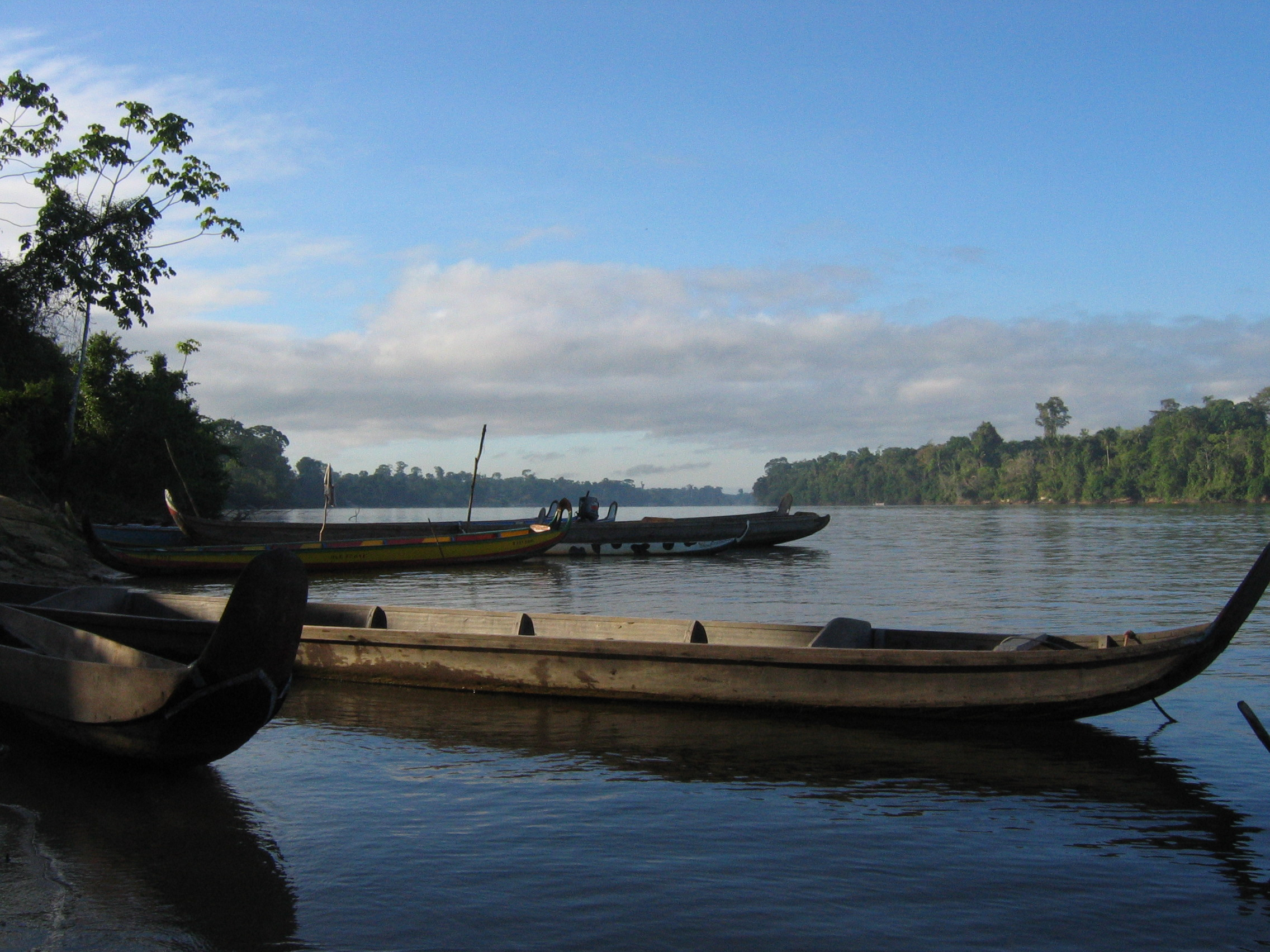
Maroni river near Grand-Santi

On 22 April, there were 107 cases and 84 recoveries from COVID-19. The virus has spread to Grand-Santi, a man who worked at the Medical Center of West Guiana, came into contact with residents of the Kampong Tonka. An investigation resulted in nine positive cases. The Kampong had been put in confinement. Other districts that were affected were Saint-Laurent, Kourou, Cayenne, and Maripasoula which all went into quarantine as well as Hôtel Du Fleuve. On 24 April, the confinement was extended to villages of Mafoutou and Monfina, located about 10 km south of Grand-Santi Airport. Of the 66 people tested on that Friday and Saturday, 12 tested positive. On 13 May, it was reported that there had been no new cases in Grand-Santi for two weeks. 22 cases had been discovered in the area of the virus.

On 25 April, the announcement of a new cluster at St-Georges de l'Oyapock near the border with Brazil has resulted in a reinforcement of controls on the border. The Brazilian border town of Oiapoque had 7 confirmed cases. As of 29 April, Oiapoque had 23 infections and one death due to COVID-19.

On 28 April, Georges Patient raised the alarm in the Senate of France that the local communities in the overseas territories would suffer an enormous fall in revenue as a result of the coronavirus, and that the current provisions in the 2020 finance bill were severely inadequate.
The poorest households would receive two government bonuses. €9.8 million had been allocated and would aid 35,000 households and 68,000 children.

On 29 April, the local government of French Guiana voted unanimously against the reopening of schools as announced by Macron. School will recommence in September.
The confinement caused long queues at service stations to get gas cylinders. Even though there had been no shortage, there was a limited amount of places that they could be obtained.
Arianespace would gradually resume its operations from 11 May onwards. Flight VV16/SSMS launched mid July. The Soyuz missions would resume that Summer.

On 30 April, French Guiana was listed as "green" meaning that the virus was now under control. There were two patients in hospital and none in intensive care.
Families were re-permitted to visit elders in nursing homes (EHPAD). The visits were only on Thursday mornings, by appointment, and under strict measures.

=== May 2020 ===
On 2 May, the indigenous village of Organabo in Iracoubo voluntarily confined itself. Chief Ernest Grand Emile was concerned because the 200 people of the village are mainly elderly, and the village is self sufficient.

On 7 May, Olivier Véran, Minister of Solidarity and Health, announced that workers in nursing homes (EHPADs) would receive a €1,000 to €1,500 bonus.

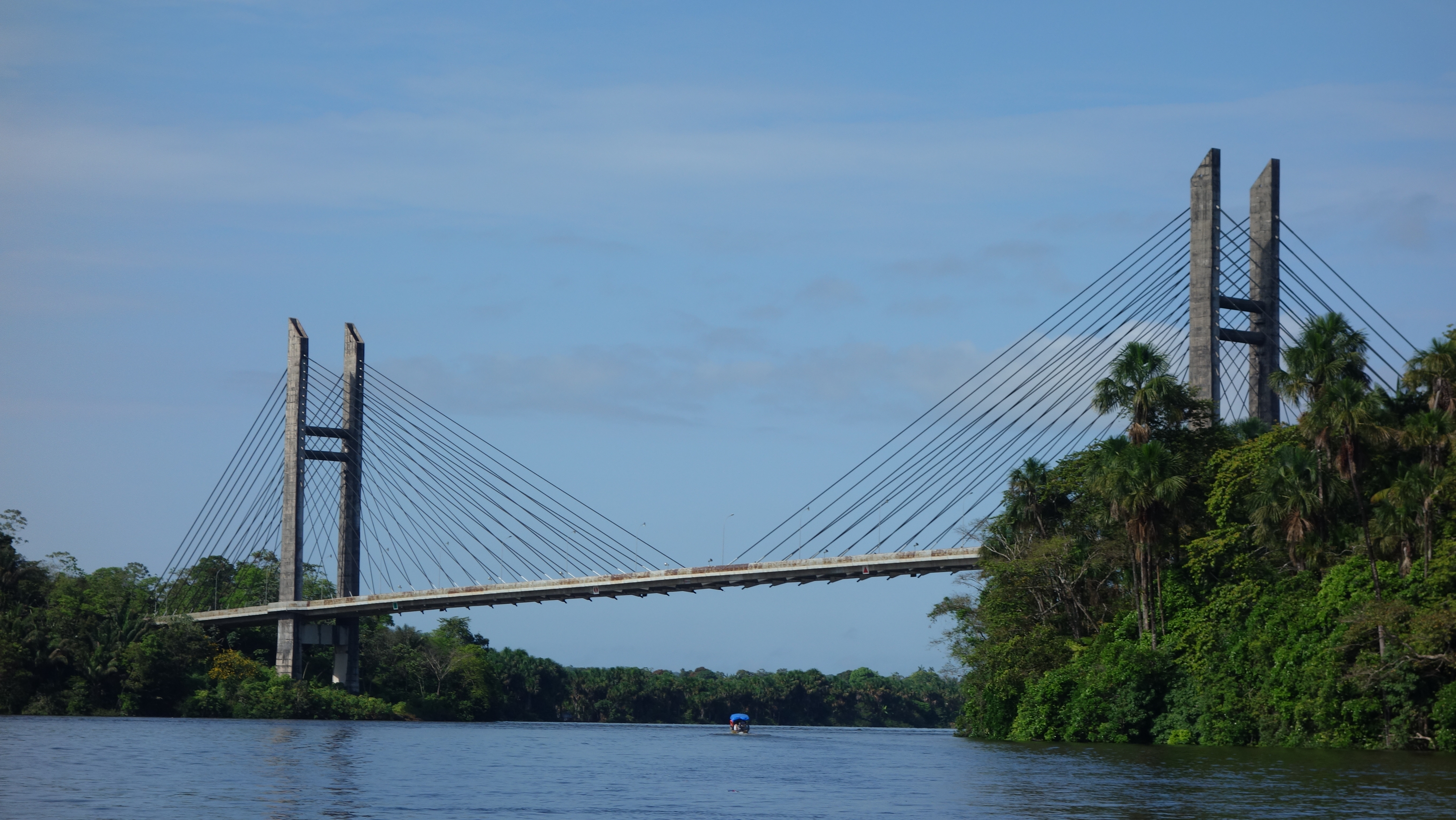
Oyapock River Bridge connecting Saint-Georges with Oiapoque

From 11 May, the first stage of de-confinement came into effect, except for Saint-Georges de l'Oyapock, which would remain confined, because the region had up to new COVID-19 cases. The curfew was now from 23:00 to 05:00.
The Pasteur Institute announced that would will start a drive-through testing project and plan to increase the number of tests to 500 per day. Private laboratories responded to the call, but were not ready at the time. On 10 May, there was no report, because the materials were not transported to the hospital laboratories.

On 12 May, the market of Cayenne closed until further notice, but the market of Saint-Laurent would reopen on 13 May.

On 13 May, the number of cases increased by 11, ten of which have been reported in Saint-Georges de l'Oyapock, which had 37 cases so far of COVID-19. On the other side of the border in Oiapoque, Brazil, the situation was even worse: 57 people had been infected with the virus, however the city lacked adequate medical staff, tests, and equipment which prompted a state of emergency.

On 14 May, an action plan for Saint-Georges de l'Oyapock was announced which included a massive screening operation which would start in the next week, and movement between neighborhoods would be limited.

On 18 May, Georges Elfort, the mayor of Saint-Georges, announced that the whole population would be tested for COVID-19 whether they were or symptomatic or not.

=== June 2020 ===
On 8 June, a second death was reported. A 92-year-old man died at the Andrée-Rosemon Hospital.

On 11 June, 126 new cases of COVID-19 were discovered. The virus had spread over the country, with most infections in Cayenne.

On 21 June, 278 new cases were reported of COVID-19, 218 cases of which were in Cayenne.

=== July 2020 ===
On 5 July, it was announced that Prefect Patrice Latron had been appointed as the new Crisis Director in French Guiana. Latron would be in permanent contact with crisis center in Paris, together with the current Prefect and the Director General of ARS to manage the regional management team. Additional health care workers would also be sent to the territory.

On 9 July, the number of infections was 5,558 which implied that almost 2% of the population had been infected with COVID-19.

As of 9 July, French Guiana was now third based on relative number of infections after Qatar (102,110 out of 2,688,235) and San Marino (698 out of 33,745).

== Preventive measures ==
- All borders, airports, ports and space ports are closed to passengers. Guiana Space Center would reopen on 11 May.
- All schools have been closed. Schools will not reopen on 11 May.
- A curfew had been instituted in Cayenne from 20:00. and 21:00 elsewhere. From 11 May onward, the curfew was changed from 23:00 to 05:00 except in Saint-Georges de l'Oyapock which would remain confined. As of 28 May, the curfew was suspended in 12 out of the 22 municipalities.
- Everybody should stay at home except for essential journeys. Certificates are needed for exceptions. From 11 May onward, this had been revoked except for Saint-Georges de l'Oyapock.
- All non-essential businesses must close. On 11 May, businesses could reopen.
- On 11 May, de-confinement would start, businesses will reopen, masks would be mandatory, and beaches will reopen. Restaurants and bars would not be allowed to reopen. There would be a mandatory 14 day quarantine for people entering the territory.

== Crisis management ==
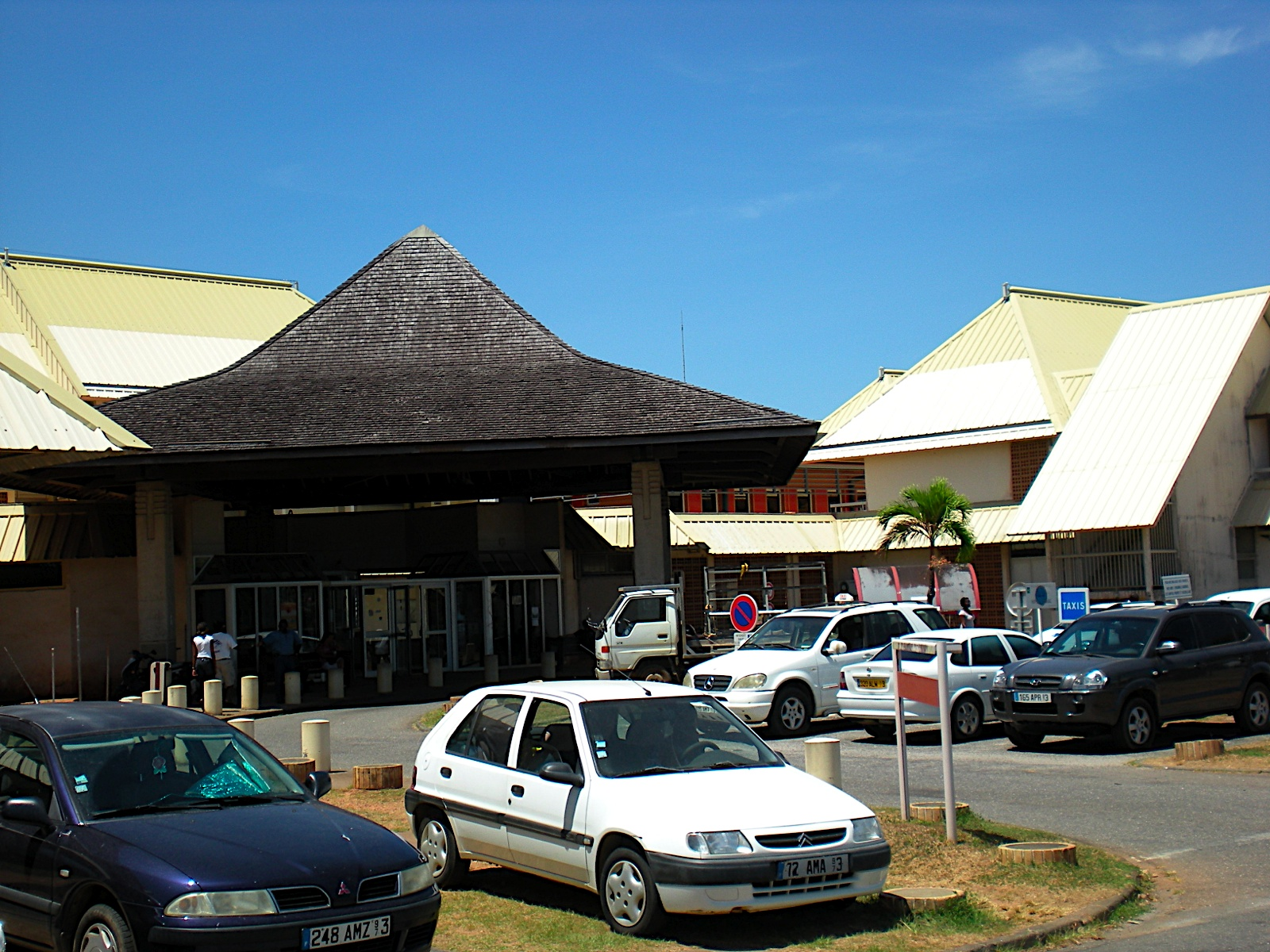
Andrée Rosemon Hospital in Cayenne

French Guiana is an overseas department and region of the French Republic and the State is represented by a Prefect. One of the tasks of the Prefect is to manage major crises. Marc Del Grande is the current Prefect and therefore in charge of the management of the COVID-19 pandemic. On 5 July, prefect Patrice Latron was appointed as the new crisis director in French Guiana, and work with Del Grande and the Director General of ARS as the crisis management team.

Testing for COVID-19 is being performed by the Pasteur Institute in Cayenne on weekdays, and in the laboratories of the Andrée-Rosemon Hospital in Cayenne, and the Centre Hospitalier in Kourou in the weekend. Mirdad Kazanji, Director of the Pasteur Institute, explained that to ensure the quality of the testing, both negative and positive samples have been sent to and received from the Central Laboratory in Paramaribo, Suriname.

=== Research ===
On 23 March, the Pasteur Institute of French Guiana has initiated EPI-COVID-19, which is a study into the transmission of the coronavirus within the household. Three hundred contacts which are part of a family which has a diagnosed patient are monitored clinically, virologically and serologically. The study is funded by the Agence Nationale de la Recherche, Pasteur Institute, and ARS Guyane.

== Situation report ==
Situation report
Date		7 May 2020	2 July 2020	10 September 2020
Tests	Samples analysed	2,445	5,200	3,417
Origin	Imported	45 (33%)		
	Community transmission	93 (67%)		
Age	<15	20	4	3
	15-44	75	42	20
	45-64	32	36	37
	65-74	4	20	26
	≥75	2	17	15
Clusters	Number of clusters	17		3
	Average size	6.3		
	Average days between symptoms first and second case	5.9		
	Family clusters	8		
	Community clusters	9		
Contact tracing	Number of subjects	1,241		
	Average number of contacts per case	8.7		
	Number of confirmed cases among contacts	35 (28%)		

Source: ARS Guyane Spécial COVID-19 2020-05-07

== Statistics ==
Chronology of the number of active cases

Note: No recovery data after 19 October 2020

== See also ==
- COVID-19 pandemic by country
- COVID-19 pandemic in South America
