= Patrice Latron =

French official

Crisis Director COVID-19 pandemic in French Guiana
- Incumbent
- Assumed office 5 July 2020

Prefect of Saint Pierre and Miquelon
- In office 17 November 2011 – 2 September 2014
- Preceded by: Jean-Régis Borius
- Succeeded by: Jean-Christophe Bouvier

Prefect of Yonne
- In office 28 July 2017 – 5 January 2020
- Preceded by: Jean-Christophe Moraud
- Succeeded by: Henri Prevost

Personal details
- Born: Partice Paul Marie Latron; 27 July 1961 (age 64) Bida, Eraguene, Algeria

Patrice Latron (born 27 July 1961 in Bida, Eraguene, Algeria) is a French senior civil servant, former prefect, and the Crisis Director for the COVID-19 pandemic in French Guiana.

== Biography ==
Patrice Paul Marie Latron graduated from the University of Nanterre with an associate degree in English. In 1983, he graduated from the Special Military School of Saint-Cyr.

Between July 1994 and May 1995, Latron was appointed as aide-de-camp (personal assistant) to Prime Minister Édouard Balladur and served Alain Juppé between May 1995 until June 1997.

Between 17 November 2011 and 2 September 2014, Latron was the Prefect of Saint-Pierre-et-Miquelon. Between 28 July 2017 and 5 January 2020, Latron was the Prefect of Yonne. On 11 December 2019, he was appointed government advisor, responsible for the deployment of the Service national universel (civil conscription). On 12 November 2020, Latron was relieved as advisor at his own request.

On 5 July 2020, it was announced that Latron had been appointed as the Crisis Director for the COVID-19 pandemic in French Guiana. As Crisis Director, he will work with Prefect Marc Del Grande and the Director General of ARS Guyane in the crisis management team and will be in permanent contact with crisis center in Paris.
