= Bercot =

Bercot is a surname. Notable people with the surname include:

- David Bercot (born 1950), American Christian writer
- Emmanuelle Bercot (born 1967), French actress, film director and screenwriter

== See also ==
- Jean-Pierre Berçot, French diplomat
- Studio Berçot, Paris-based private training institute in fashion design
