= Prefect of Saint Pierre and Miquelon =

The Prefect of Saint Pierre and Miquelon is the local representative of the President of France in Saint Pierre and Miquelon, and in effect the governor or executive officer of the territory. The Prefect was called Governor until 1976.

== Overview ==
Throughout the history of Saint-Pierre and Miquelon, there has been a variety of representation, from governors to administrators.

The Prefect at the Préfecture or Governor's Offices are located at Place du Lieutenant-Colonel Pigeaud. The buildings consist of a three-storey building with a two-storey annex. It is located in the area known as Church Square in Saint-Pierre.

== Le Cabinet du Préfet ==
The Cabinet du Préfet is a cabinet, made up of civil servants - not politicians - under the authority of the Prefect and responsible for the services of the Préfecture of Saint Pierre and Miquelon. The Préfecture has its own internal services. It also has under its authority the decentralised services of the French government ministries.

They consist of:

- Missions traditionnelles - a civil servant with responsibility with visiting French officials, ex-servicemen, patriotic affairs
- Sécurité civile - civil defence
- Sûreté et sécurité publique - public security
- Délégation aux droits des femmes - women's rights
- Communication - principal private secretary to the Prefect and Press Office
- Coopération régionale - regional co-operation
- Délégation de Miquelon - a civil servant charged with representing Miquelon

The prefect is also assisted by the Secrétaire général, which acts as the Office of the Prefect, Chief Secretary (responsible for day-to-day functions of the government) and the protocol office.

== List of governors ==
A historic list of representative in Saint-Pierre and Miquelon:

Representative of the governor of Plaisance

- 1689–169?: Louis Pastour de Constebelle

Governor

- 1693–?: Simon de Bellorme

Commandant

- 1702–1708: Baron de Sourdeval

French governors

- 15 June 1763 – 31 July 1773: François-Gabriel D'Angeac
- 1773 – 14 September 1778: Charles Gabriel Sébastien, Baron de l'Espérance
- 17 September 1778 – 28 July 1783: John Evans — British governor
- 28 July 1783 – 16 June 1785: Charles Gabriel Sébastien, Baron de l'Espérance

Commandants

- 16 June 1785 – 14 May 1793: Antoine Nicolas Dandasne-Danseville
- 29 March 1788 – 15 October 1790: Julien Gausse du Mesnil-Ambert, acting
- 14 May 1793 – 1796?: Percy F. Thorne (British administrator and Royal Navy commander)
- 1802: Henry Folkes Edgell (British administrator and Royal Navy commander)
- 1802 – 20 March 1803: Tocet (acting)
- March 1803 – 1804: Richard Longfield Davies (British administrator and Royal Navy commander)
- 1804–1815: vacant
- 1815: David Buchan (British administrator and Royal Navy commander)
- January – May 1816: vacant
- 22 June 1816 – 1 November 1818: Jean-Philippe Bourilhon

Commandants and administrators

- 1 November 1818 – 20 June 1819: Augustin Valentin Borius (interim)
- 20 June 1819 – 11 June 1825: Philippe Athanase Hélène Fayolle
- 11 June 1825 – 28 May 1828: Augustin Valentin Borius
- 28 May 1828 – 10 September 1839: Joseph Louis Michel Brue
- 1 October 1831 – 16 April 1832: François Julien Guy Paris
- 7 October 1835 – 14 June 1836: François Julien Guy Paris (interim)
- 10 September 1839 – 1 July 1842: Louis Alexandre Mamyneau

Commandants

- 1 July 1842 – 14 July 1842: Hubert Eléonore Napoléon Philibert
- Philippe Alfred Guichon de Grandpont (interim)
- 14 July 1842 – 3 July 1845: Joseph Alphonse Desrousseaux
- 3 July 1845 – 14 October 1849: Joseph Marie Fidèle Délécluse (commandant and commissioner)
- 14 October 1849 – 3 July 1850: Prosper Benony Bruslé (interim)
- 3 July 1850 – 10 October 1855: Jacques François Gervais
- 10 October 1855 – 14 May 1856: Ange Gautier (interim)
- 14 May 1856 – 4 May 1859: Jacques François Gervais
- 4 May 1859 – 13 September 1863: Émile François Guillaume Clément, comte de la Roncière
- 13 September 1863 – 13 February 1864: Auguste La Borde (interim)
- 13 February 1864 – 3 May 1864: Ernest Joseph Nicolas d'Heureux (interim)
- 3 May 1864 – 19 May 1864: Charles Faure (acting)
- 19 May 1864 – 9 May 1872: Pierre Vincent Cren
- 12 October 1868 – 6 May 1869: Alexandre Marie Le Clos
- 9 May 1872 – 18 May 1873: Ernest Joseph Nicolas d'Heureux (interim)
- 18 May 1873 – 30 July 1876: Charles Henri Alfred Joubert
- 30 July 1876 – 28 May 1877: Auguste Victor Arnoux Tranchevent (interim)
- 28 May 1877 – 25 November 1879: Antoine Étienne Guien
- 25 November 1879 – 18 January 1880: Auguste René Cariot (interim)
- 18 January 1880 – 26 April 1886: Gaston Louis, comte de Saint-Phalle
- 26 April 1886 – 5 June 1886: Aristide Le Fol (interim)
- 5 June 1886 – 5 September 1887: Henri de Lamothe

Governors

- 5 September 1887 – 5 December 1887: Henri Félix de Lamothe (1st time)
- 5 December 1887 – 15 February 1888: Aristide Le Fol (interim)
- 15 February 1888 – 21 March 1888: Justin Hebert-Suffrin (interim)
- 21 March 1888 – 22 April 1888: Henri Charles Roberdeau (1st time, interim)
- 22 April 1888 – 17 September 1889: Henri Félix de Lamothe
- 17 September 1889 – 1 April 1891: Henri Charles Roberdeau (interim)
- 1 April 1891 – 6 August 1891: Théophile Bergès (1st time, interim)
- 6 August 1891 – 7 September 1893: Paul Théodore Ernest Marie Feillet
- 7 September 1893 – 3 August 1894: Maurice Caperon (1st time, interim)
- 3 August 1894 – 25 October 1895: Laurent Marie Émile Beauchamp
- 25 October 1895 – 29 April 1896: Théophile Bergès (interim)
- 29 April 1896 – 27 August 1896: Henri Tournie (interim)
- 27 August 1896 – 14 August 1899: Paul Émile Daclin Sibor
- 22 November 1897 – 25 February 1899: Maurice Caperon (2nd time, interim)
- 14 August 1899 – 8 February 1900: Maurice Caperon (3rd time, interim)
- 8 February 1900 – 9 September 1900: Paul Samary
- 9 September 1900 – 13 June 1901: Maurice Caperon (interim)
- 13 June 1901 – 15 May 1904: Philippe Émile Jullien
- 5 June 1902 – 27 June 1902: Paul Certonciny (interim)
- 10 September 1902 – 25 July 1903: Maurice Caperon (5th time, interim)
- 15 May 1904 – 26 May 1904: René André (interim)
- 26 May 1904 – 8 December 1904: Maurice Caperon (interim)
- 8 December 1904 – 9 June 1905: Paul Jean François Cousturier
- 9 June 1905 – 12 May 1906: Gabriel Louis Angoulvant

Administrators

- 12 May 1906 – 15 August 1908: Raphaël Antonetti
- 6 January 1908 – 11 March 1908: Léon Bousquet (interim)
- 15 August 1908 – 28 November 1908: Charles Moulin (interim)
- 28 November 1908 – 1 July 1911: Pierre Jean Henri Didelot
- 1 July 1911 – 10 February 1912: Ferdinand Longue (interim)
- 10 February 1912 – 2 September 1913: Henri Marchand
- 2 September 1913 – 21 April 1914: Joseph Evariste Fabre (interim)
- 21 April 1914 – 27 July 1915: Laurent Chabaud (interim)
- 27 July 1915 – 191.: Ernest Philippe François Lachat

Governors

- 1915 – 1 May 1923: Ernest Philippe François Lachat (interim)
- 1 May 1923 – 12 October 1927: Jean Henri Émile Bensch
- 21 October 1925 – 30 April 1926: Marc Michel (interim)
- 12 October 1927 – 27 February 1928: Charles Nirpot (interim)
- 27 February 1928 – 14 February 1929: François Adrien Juvanon
- 14 February 1929 – 5 May 1932: Henri Sautot (interim)
- 5 May 1932 – 20 February 1933: Georges Marie Roger Chanot (interim)

Administrators

- 20 February 1933 – 17 December 1936: Georges Jules Eugène Barrillot
- 17 December 1936 – 24 December 1941: Gilbert de Bournat
- 24 December 1941 – 25 December 1941: Admiral Émile Muselier (Commander of Free French forces)
- 25 December 1941 – 25 February 1943: Alain Savary
- 25 February 1943 – 10 February 1946: Pierre Marie Jacques François Garrouste
- 10 February 1946 – 20 September 1946: Marc Tchernonog (interim)
- 20 September 1946 – 31 December 1947: Maurice René Charles Victor Marchand

Governors

- 31 December 1947 – 30 June 1949: Jean René Moisset
- 30 June 1949 – 6 November 1950: Guy Clech (interim)
- 6 November 1950 – 25 April 1952: Eugène Alain Charles Louis Alaniou
- 25 April 1952 – 5 January 1955: Irenée Francois Antoine Davier
- 5 January 1955 – 25 August 1958: Pierre Sicaud
- 25 August 1958 – 3 December 1960: René Louis Pont
- 3 December 1960 – 12 December 1962: Michel Maillard
- 12 December 1962 – 16 October 1965: Jacques Emmanuel Herry
- 16 October 1965 – 5 June 1967: Georges Marie Joseph Poulet
- 5 June 1967 – 7 April 1971: Jean-Jacques Buggia
- 7 April 1971 – 1 July 1974: Henri Beaux
- 2 August 1974 – 12 June 1975: Jean Cluchard
- 14 May 1975 – 4 August 1976: Jean Massendès

Prefects (10 May 1982 – 24 February 1988, commissioners of the republic)

- 4 August 1976 – 21 May 1977: Jean Massendès
- 3 June 1977 – 26 September 1979: Pierre Eydoux
- 13 October 1979 – 11 July 1981: Clément Bouhin
- 31 August 1981 – 23 March 1982: Claude Guyon
- 13 April 1982 – 10 May 1983: Philippe Parant
- 25 June 1983 – 26 March 1985: Gérard Lefèvre
- 1 April 1985 – 14 July 1987: Bernard Leurquin
- 24 July 1987 – 20 December 1988: Jean-René Garnier
- 8 January 1989 – 10 June 1991: Jean-Pierre Marquié
- 10 June 1991 – 29 June 1992: Kamel Khrissate
- 29 June 1992 – 11 January 1994: Yves Henry
- 11 January 1994 – 28 January 1996: René Maurice
- 28 January 1996 – 23 November 1997: Jean-François Carenco
- 1 December 1997 – 25 October 1999: Rémi Thuau
- 25 October 1999 – 1 February 2001: Francis Spitzer
- 1 February 2001 – 3 November 2002: Jean-François Tallec
- 3 November 2002 – 10 January 2005: Claude Valleix
- 10 January 2005 – 28 August 2006: Albert Dupuy
- 28 August 2006 – 28 July 2008: Yves Fauqueur
- 28 July 2008 – 29 October 2009: Jean-Pierre Berçot
- 29 October 2009 – 16 November 2011: Jean-Régis Borius
- 16 November 2011 – 2 September 2014: Patrice Latron
- 2 September 2014 – 3 March 2016: Jean-Christophe Bouvier
- 3 March 2016 – 20 December 2017: Henri Jean
- 20 December 2017 – 6 January 2021: Christian Pouget
- 6 January 2021 – 21 August 2023: Bruno André

== See also ==
- Territorial Council of Saint Pierre and Miquelon
- Municipal governments in Saint Pierre and Miquelon
- Politics of Saint Pierre and Miquelon
- History of Saint Pierre and Miquelon
