= Brest University Hospital Centre =

Hospital in Brittany, France

Coordinates: 48.393°N 4.487°W

Brest University Hospital Centre, (CHRU de Brest), based in Brest runs:

- Augustin-Morvan hospital;
- Cavale Blanche Hospital;
- Bohars hospital;
- Carhaix hospital;
- René-Fortin center;
- care and rehabilitation centre of Guilers;
- EHPAD Delcourt-Ponchelet, Keravel, Persivien.

It has nine specialized hospitality sites, 2,200 beds, 760,000 people hospitalized each year, 6,500 professionals and 1,300 students and is prominent in development of research and innovation in the medical field, particularly in the management of autoimmune diseases and the treatment of medical imaging.
