= List of hospitals in French Guiana =

This is a list of hospitals in the French overseas department and region of French Guiana. The following hospitals are located in French Guiana:

- Andrée-Rosemon Hospital, Cayenne (full service hospital)
- Centre Hospitalier de Cayenne, Saint-Georges-de-l'Oyapock
- Kourou Hospital Center, Kourou
- Centre Hospitalier de l’Ouest Guyanais, Saint-Laurent du Maroni
- Private Hospital Saint-Paul, Cayenne

== Historical hospitals ==
- André-Bouron Hospital, Saint-Laurent du Maroni (In use until September 2018)
