= Henri Jean =

French official

Prefect of Saint-Pierre and Miquelon
- In office 3 March 2016 – 20 December 2017
- Preceded by: Jean-Christophe Bouvier
- Succeeded by: Thierry Devimeux

Personal details
- Born: August 22, 1954 (age 71) Vaucluse
- Children: 2
- Awards: Knight of the National Order of Merit

Henri Jean (born 22 August 1954) served as Prefect of Saint Pierre and Miquelon from March 2016 to January 2018. He replaced Jean-Christophe Bouvier and was replaced by Thierry Devimeux.

== Early life and career ==
Jean was born on August 22 1954 in Vaucluse, France. Before joining the École nationale d'administration, he worked as a teacher. In 2003, he joined the civil security department of the Ministry of the Interior (France) and became director general of the services of the General Council of Aude in 2005.

== Honours ==
- Knight of the National Order of Merit (2014).
