= François-Gabriel d'Angeac =

First French governor of Saint Pierre and Miquelon

- Born: 1708; Plaisance, New France
- Died: 9 March 1782 (aged 74); Soubise, Charente-Maritime, France
- Military career
- Allegiance: France
- Branch: French Colonial Forces
- Service years: 1716–1772
- Rank: Brigadier des armées
- Conflicts: Siege of Louisbourg (1745); Siege of Louisbourg (1758); Battle of Restigouche
- Awards: Cross of the Order of Saint-Louis
- Other work: First French governor of Saint Pierre and Miquelon

François-Gabriel d'Angeac (variants: Dangeac, Danjaique, Don Jacque) (1708 – 9 March 1782), Knight of Saint-Louis, was an officer in the French colonial regular troops and the first French governor of Saint Pierre and Miquelon.

== Early life ==
D'Angeac was born in the French colony of Plaisance (present-day Placentia, Newfoundland and Labrador, Canada). He was the son of Gabriel d’Angeac (born Saintonge; died 1737, Île Royale, now Cape Breton Island), a military man stationed at the time with Joseph de St. Ovide, Monbeton de Brouillan's company in Plaisance. His mother was Marguerite Bertrand. In 1714, his father and the garrison were reassigned to Louisbourg where, five years later, France began construction of a fortified town.

At the age of eight, d'Angeac began his military career as a guard at Port-Dauphin, Nova Scotia (now Englishtown) on Île Royale. In 1723, d'Angeac was given the rank of second ensign and assigned to his father's company at Louisbourg.

== Career ==
During the periods of 1738–1741 and 1743–1745, d'Angeac was a lieutenant and sometimes served as commandant at Port-Dauphin. D'Angeac helped defend Louisbourg during the 1745 siege of Louisbourg by New England forces, but after the defeat, he left for France where he recruited troops for colonial companies. He was promoted to captain in 1747, and accompanied Île Royale's garrison to Quebec before returning to Louisbourg in 1749 upon its reoccupation by France. From 1751 to 1758, he served as commandant of Port-Dauphin supervising outpost reconstruction. He was awarded the Cross of the Order of Saint-Louis in 1754 (his father had received it in 1724). D'Angeac sustained a chest wound during the 1758 siege of Louisbourg.

In 1760, Captain d’Angeac was placed in command of French reinforcement troops sent to Canada to aid the commander of the French fleet, François Chenard de La Giraudais, prior to the Battle of Restigouche. His squadron was defeated on 8 July 1760 by Captain John Byron's British naval squadron, the last naval engagement of New France. However, D'Angeac organized thousands of Acadians and Indians and bolstered French defenses. Though there was ultimately an order to surrender, D’Angeac was defiant, until finally agreeing to terms.

=== Governor ===
With the signing of the 1763 Treaty of Paris, the islands of Saint-Pierre and Miquelon became a new French colony, replacing Louisbourg as France's sedentary fishery base and deep-sea fishing fleet refuge. When d’Angeac was appointed governor, Sir Charles Douglas delayed d'Angeac while Captain James Cook worked quickly to complete his survey of Saint-Pierre and Miquelon. D'Angeac served as governor from 15 June 1763 to 31 July 1773. His relations with Newfoundland's governor, Hugh Palliser, were strained; Palliser's letters were considered rude. D'Angeac requested permission to retire in 1765; it was denied. He was promoted to Brigadier des armées of the line infantry in 1770. Two years later, he left the island of Saint-Pierre for France. With his recommendation, he was succeeded by his nephew, Charles Gabriel Sébastien, Baron de l'Espérance (born 1725, Louisbourg; died 1791).

== Personal life ==
On 31 December 1735, in Louisbourg, he married Geneviève (sister of Jean-François Lefebvre de Bellefeuille). They had seven children.

D'Angeac retired to Soubise, Charente-Maritime, France where he died in 1782.
