= André-Bouron Hospital =

Former hospital in Saint-Laurent-du-Maroni, French Guiana

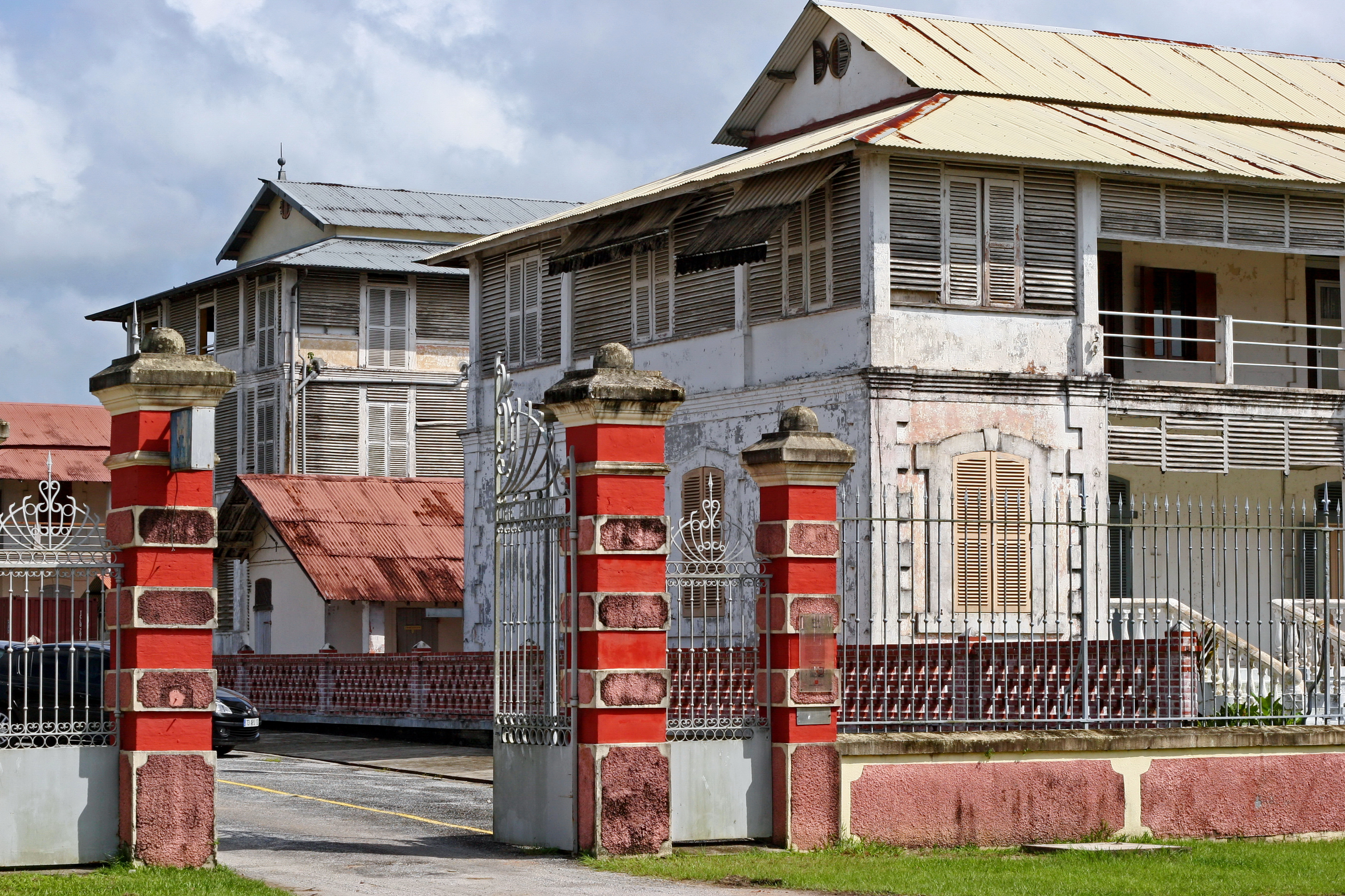

Geography
- Location: Avenue du Général-de-Gaulle 97320, Saint-Laurent-du-Maroni, French Guiana
- Coordinates: 5.50075°N 54.03122°W

Services
- Beds: 274

History
- Constructed: 1882
- Founded: 1870s
- Closed: 27 September 2018

Links
- Lists: Hospitals in French Guiana
- Other links: Hospitals in French Guiana

André-Bouron Hospital (French: Hôpital André-Bouron) was a hospital in Saint-Laurent-du-Maroni, French Guiana. Established in the 1870s for both civilians and penal colony inmates, the hospital closed on 27 September 2018. The hospital was declared a historical monument on 9 March 1999.

== History ==
The first iteration of the hospital in Saint-Laurent-du-Maroni was founded during the 1870s, and treated both civilians and inmates from the penal colony. In order to meet the needs of a growing population, the construction of hospital buildings began in 1882.

The hospital was reconstructed in 1899 with a pavilion system. Two pavilions were for the free citizens and eight for the prisoners. In 1912, the hospital was extended to 400 beds, and was the largest hospital in the French colonies. In 1972, the hospital was modernized and named after Charles-Louis André Bouron, the former chief surgeon. The capacity was reduced to 274 beds, and three services were offered: general medicine, surgery and gynaecology. The terrain also contained a hospice with 175 beds.

On 9 March 1999, the hospital was declared a historical monument. In August 2000, Centre Hospitalier de l’Ouest Guyanais was opened to replace the hospital. Initially, the new hospital had a capacity of 183 beds, however it was being extended for 325 beds. André-Bouron Hospital closed on 27 September 2018.
