= Francis Spitzer =

Francis Spitzer (born 1947) served as Prefect of Saint Pierre and Miquelon from 25 October 1999 to 1 February 2001. Prior to that role, he was Deputy Prefect of Security on Corsica He has also been the director of the cabinet of the prefect of the Ardennes.
