= Battle of Restigouche =

1760 naval battle of the Seven Years' War

- Part of the French and Indian War
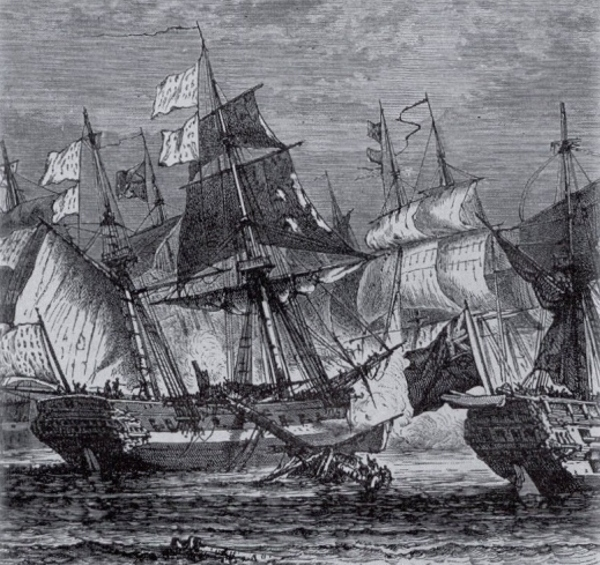
- Illustration of the battle
Date	June 28 – July 8, 1760
Location	Restigouche River
Result	British victory

Belligerents
Great Britain	France; Mi'kmaq

Commanders and leaders
John Byron	Francois de Giraudais

Strength
3 ships of the line 2 frigates	1 frigate 5 merchantmen

Casualties and losses
20 killed or wounded	30 killed or wounded 1 frigate destroyed 5 merchantmen sunk, destroyed or captured

National Historic Site of Canada
- Official name: Battle of the Restigouche National Historic Site of Canada
- Designated: 1924

The Battle of Restigouche was a naval battle fought in 1760 during the Seven Years' War (known as the French and Indian War in the United States) on the Restigouche River between the British Royal Navy and the small flotilla of vessels of the French Navy, Acadian militia and Mi'kmaq militias. The loss of the French vessels, which had been sent to support and resupply the troops in New France after the fall of Quebec, marked the end of any serious attempt by France to keep hold of their colonies in North America. The battle was the last major engagement of the Mi'kmaq and Acadian militias before the Burying of the Hatchet Ceremony between the Mi'kmaq and the British.

== Background ==
Quebec had fallen to the British in September 1759, at the Battle of the Plains of Abraham, but French forces remained in New France in large numbers. Supplies were important because France ran their colonies and military such that the colonies were wholly dependent on products and manufacturing of the motherland. Several appeals to the French government for reinforcements met with indifference or neglect, partly because the French navy had been smashed at the Battle of Quiberon Bay in November 1759.

On April 10, 1760, the frigate Le Machault under Lieutenant Francois La Giraudais sailed from Bordeaux with five merchant ships carrying 2,000 casks of provisions and 400 troops. Francois-Gabriel D'Angeac commanded reinforcement troops because of his familiarity with the area.

On April 11, during the outward journey, the ships in the flotilla were forced to disperse in order to run the British blockade off France. Two merchant vessels were seized, and two weeks later another ran aground in the Azores. The three remaining vessels rendezvoused in the Gulf of St. Lawrence on 15 May, only to find that a British fleet had already arrived in Quebec. Seeking a safe harbour, they sailed for Chaleur Bay and anchored in the estuary of the Restigouche River near the Mi'kmaq settlement of Listuguj on 18 May. Here they enlisted the help of the locals and some Acadien refugees in exchange for feeding and arming them.

In the meantime, a force of Royal Navy ships under Captain John Byron sailed from Louisbourg to intercept the French flotilla. They arrived in Chaleur Bay on June 22, blockading any attempt by La Giraudais to escape. He responded by sailing further upriver where the deeper draft British ships would have difficulty following. There he turned Le Machault broadside, scuttled some schooners as a barrier and placed a battery of cannon ashore to strengthen his position.

On October 26, 1759, after the fall of Quebec, the French priests who had been an integral part of the leadership of the Acadian militia and Mi'kmaq militia began to negotiate for peace. Father Manach accepted in the name of the Acadians at Richibucto (N.B.) and Baie des Ouines (Bay du Vin) the peace proposals put forward by "Commandant Henry [Alexander?] Schomberg" Father Maillard and Joseph-Charles Germain also agreed to local capitulations. These initiatives were severely criticised by French officer at Restigouche Jean-François Bourdon de Dombourg. He prepared a file on the missionaries, whom he accused of treason. The Battle of Resitgouche was one of the few battles the Acadians and Mi'kmaq undertook without the sanction of the French priests.

== Battle ==
An Acadian militia and Mi'kmaq (Mi'gmaq) militia, totalling 1,500 fighters, organized in the Battle of Restigouche. The Acadians arrived in about 20 schooners and small boats. Along with the French, they continued up the river to draw the British fleet closer to the Acadian community of Pointe-à-la-Batterie, where they were ready to launch a surprise attack on the British. The Acadians sunk a number of their vessels to create a blockade, upon which the Acadian and Mi'kmaq fired at the ships. On June 27, the British succeeded in manoeuvring just beyond the chain of sunken ships. (One of the British ships, HMS Norwich, was almost lost) Once the British were in the range of the battery, they fired on the battery. This skirmish lasted all night and was repeated with various breaks from June 28 to July 3, when the British overwhelmed Pointe-à-la-Batterie, burning 150 to 200 buildings which made up the Acadian village.

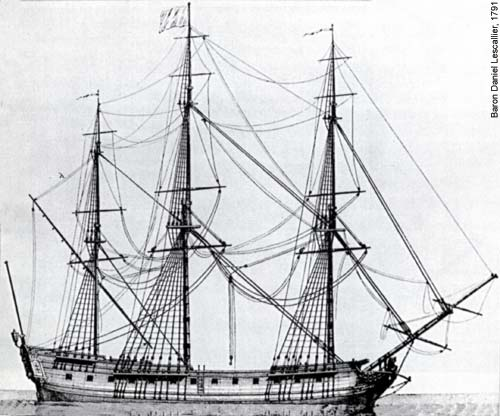
A 1791 drawing by Lascallier of a French frigate.

The militias retreated and re-grouped with Le Machault. They sunk more schooners to create another blockade and created two new batteries, one on the North shore at Pointe de la Mission (today Listuguj, Quebec), and one on the South shore at Pointe aux Sauvages (today Campbellton, New Brunswick). They created a blockade with schooners at Pointe aux Sauvages.

On July 7, Byron spent the day getting rid of the battery at Pointe aux Sauvages and later returned to the task of destroying Le Machault. By the morning of July 8, Scarborough and Repulse were in the range of the blockade and face to face with Le Machault. The British made two attempts to defeat the batteries and the militias held out. On the third attempt, they were successful.

Despite La Giraudais' positioning, Byron was able to negotiate the shallower waters and on July 3, confronted the French defensive line. At close range and in calm winds, the battle commenced. Despite being outgunned, the French inflicted heavy damage on the British before Byron succeeded in silencing the shore batteries. Le Machault and the merchant ships Bienfaisant and Marquis-de-Malauze then withdrew further upriver with the British in pursuit. For the next several days the two forces engaged in a running battle, but La Giraudais recognized that he could not win a battle of attrition and on July 8 he had Le Machault and Bienfaisant scuttled to prevent the capture of their cargo (Marquis-de-Malauze was spared due to the prisoners that she contained in her hold). The remaining French force then withdrew to the shore and the safety of Listuguj while Byron returned to Louisbourg.

== Aftermath ==
The Battle of the Restigouche ended with all the French ships and most of the Acadians' boats sunk, but the British were not successful in landing because of the number of muskets on shore. The Acadian militia and Mi'kmaq had made their last stand here and survived. In spite of this, many Acadian settlers were forced out and settled elsewhere, and by the next year the Mi'kmaq and other local First Nations had made treaties promising peace and trade with Britain, to the exclusion of French influence.

The loss of important provisions hastened the fall of New France. Without outside support and surrounded by three separate British forces, Montreal fell on September 8. La Giraudais finally surrendered on October 29, six days after hearing the news of the capitulation. Byron later commanded the British fleet that was defeated at the Battle of Grenada in 1779, as well as becoming governor of Newfoundland.

== Legacy ==
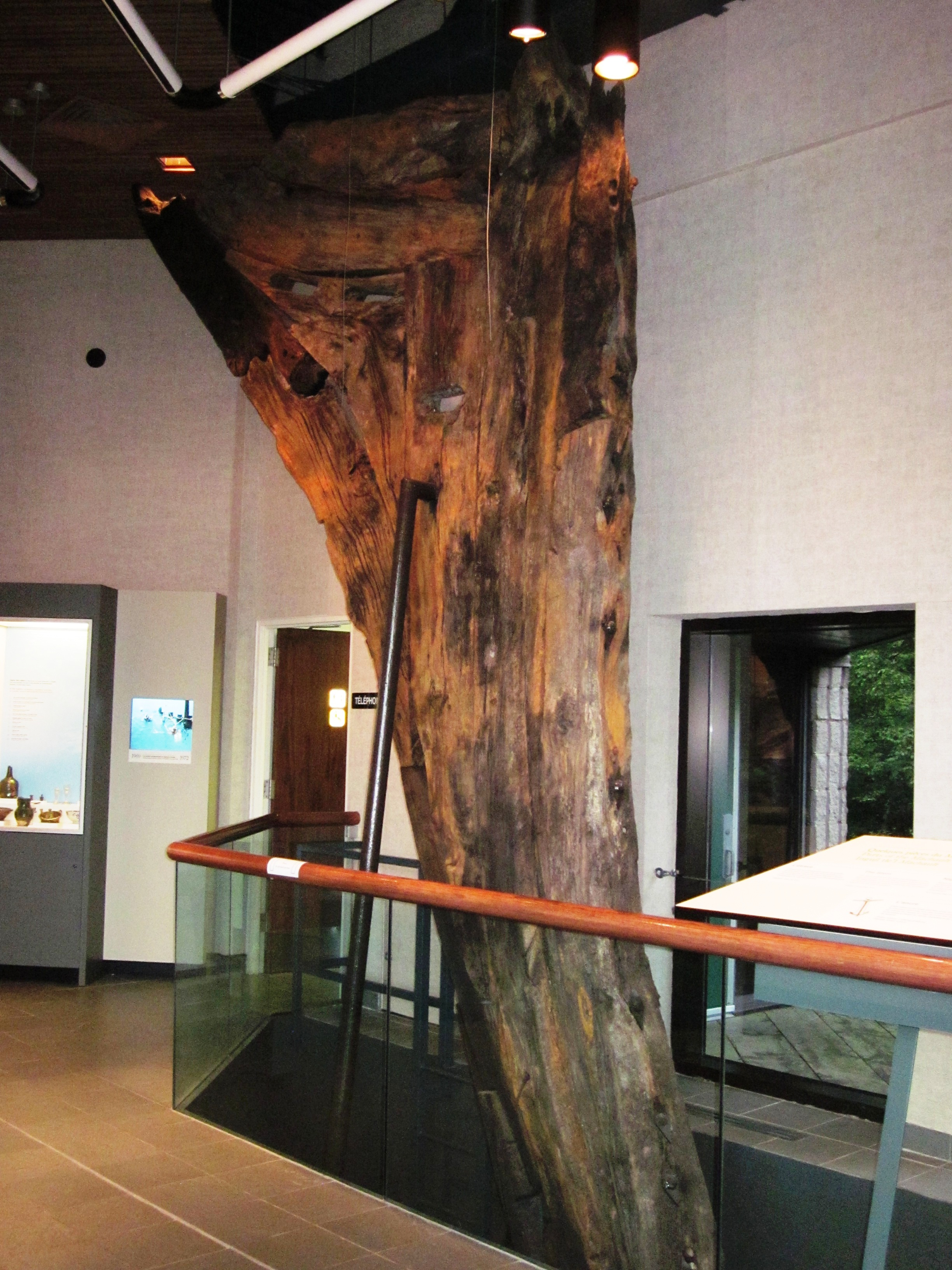
Bow of Le Machault at the Battle of the Restigouche National Historic Site

Today, the site of the battle is a National Historic Site of Canada known as Battle of the Restigouche National Historic Site. An interpretive centre located in Pointe-à-la-Croix, Quebec features artifacts recovered from the site, displays and a film about the battle, and a 1:32 scale model of the 18th century frigate Le Machault. In the summer, costumed interpreters portray the Acadians, Mi'gmaq, sailors and French soldiers who participated in the 1760 battle.
