= Eraguene =

- Commune and town
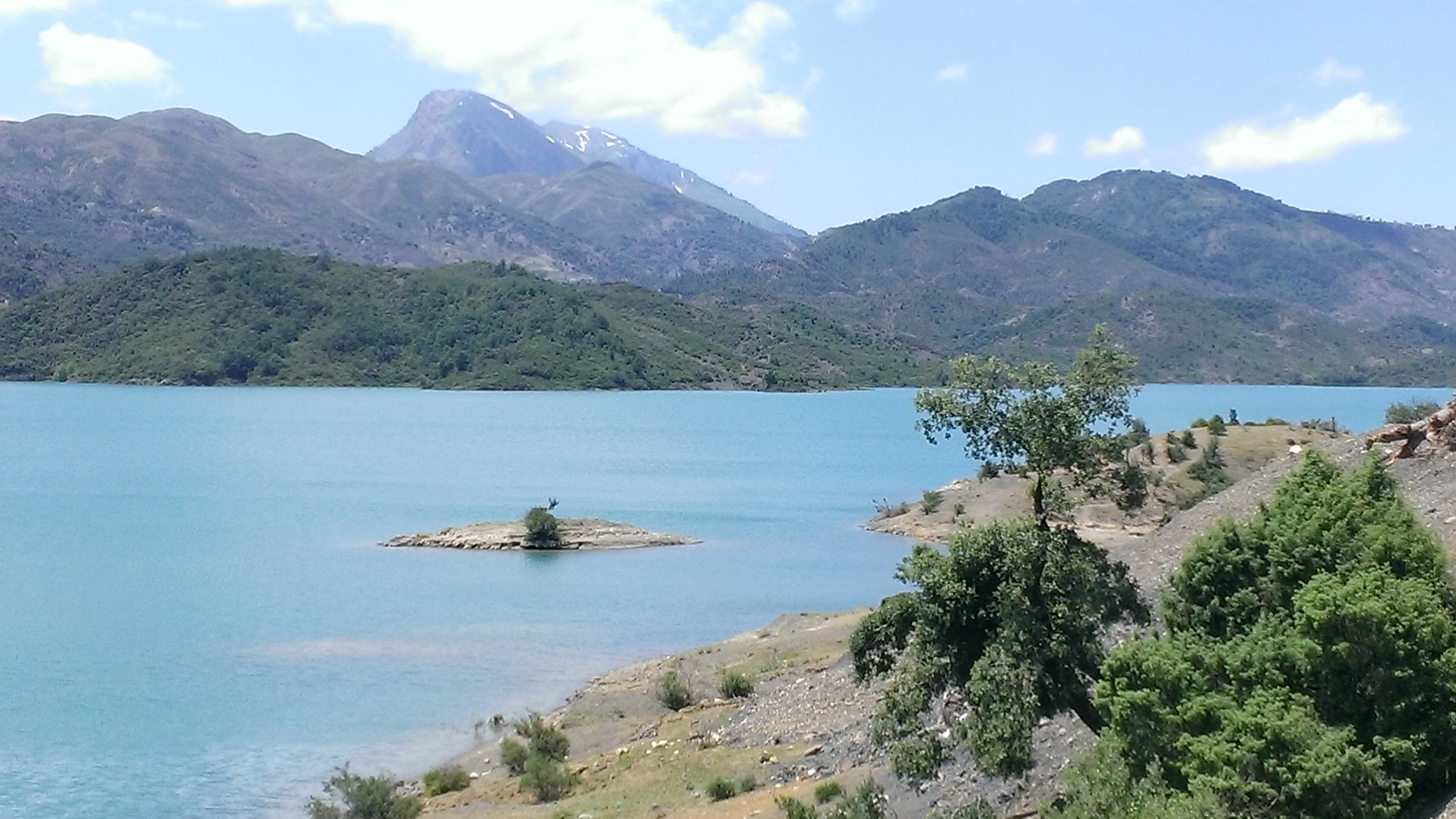
- Erraguene reservoir

- Location within Algeria
- Country: Algeria
- Province: Jijel Province

Population (1998)
  - Total: 4,088
- Time zone: UTC+1 (CET)

Eraguene is a town and commune in Jijel Province, Algeria. According to the 1998 census it has a population of 4088.

== Notable people ==
- Patrice Latron (born 1961 in Bida), French Prefect and senior civil servant
