= Kourou Hospital Center =

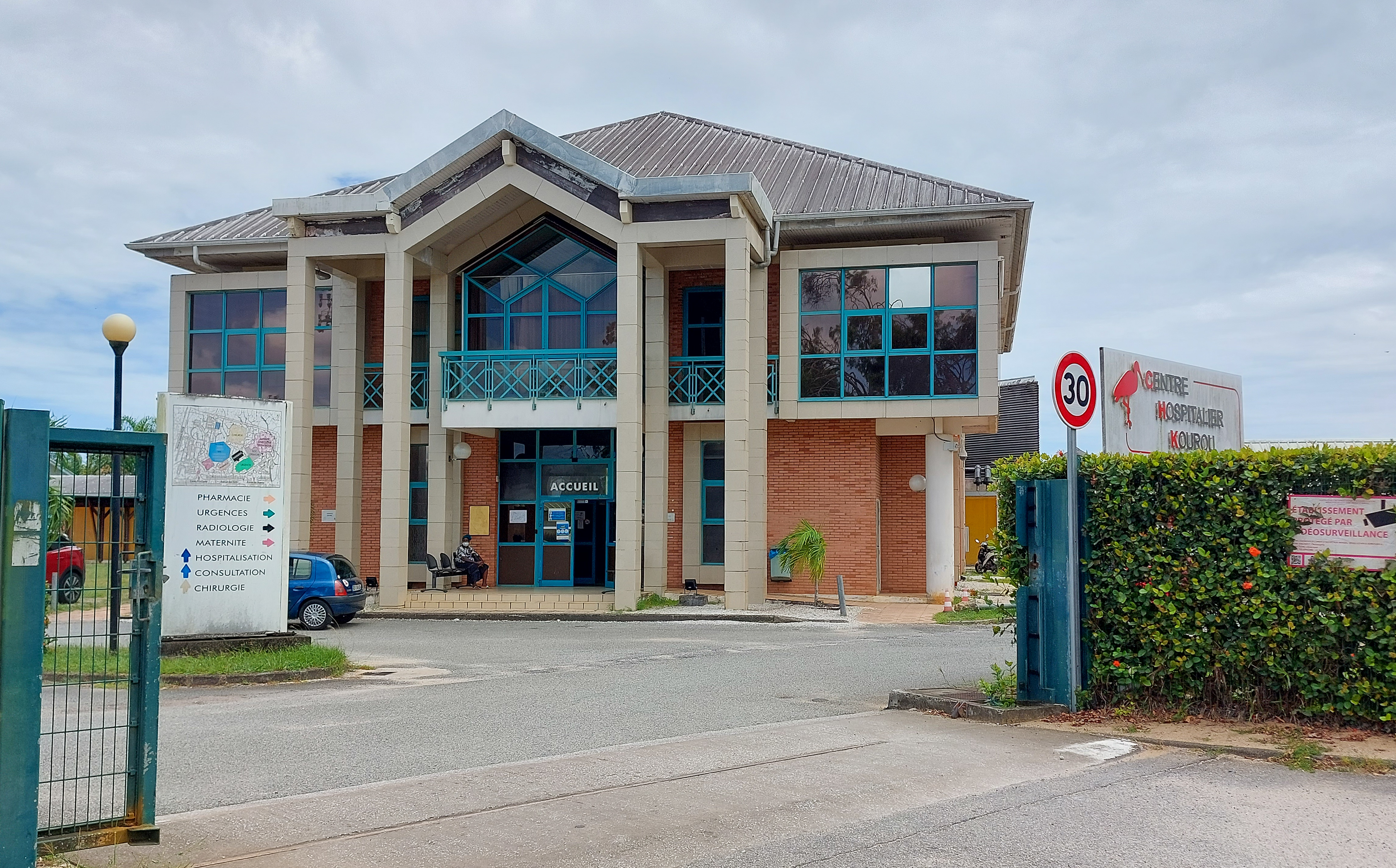
- Main entrance

Geography
- Location: Avenue Léopold Héder, BP 703 - 97387 Kourou, French Guiana, France
- Coordinates: 5°09′49″N 52°38′41″W

Organisation
- Type: Community

Services
- Emergency department: Yes
- Beds: 100+

History
- Opened: 1965 (as a primary care center); 2018 (as a hospital)

Links
- Website: https://www.ch-kourou.fr/
- Lists: Hospitals in France

The Kourou Hospital Center (Centre Hospitalier de Kourou; CHK) is a public hospital in Kourou, French Guiana.

== History ==
In 1965, the hospital was used for personnel of the Guiana Space Center and Kourou's residents. Its operating permits were held by the French space agency CNES until 1983, when they were transferred to the Kourou Medical and Surgical Association (AMCK). In 1984, the AMCK transferred management of the hospital to the French Red Cross. In 2004, the French Red Cross obtained full ownership of the hospital.

== Specialties ==
Since 2022, the Kourou hospital center has been offering polysomnography to help diagnose sleep apnea, often associated with diabetes, the latter of which has a high prevalence in French Guiana.

== See also ==
- Andrée-Rosemon Hospital
