= Korian =

French healthcare company

- Type: Public
- Traded as: Euronext Paris: CLARI; CAC Mid 60 Component
- ISIN: FR0010386334
- Industry: Caregiving
- Founded: 2003
- Key people: Sophie Boissard (Chairman & CEO)
- Revenue: €4.5 billion (2022)
- Number of employees: 57,000 (2021)
- Website: https://www.korian.fr/

Korian is a French company specialized in nursing home care for the elderly, named EHPAD (Établissement d'hébergement pour personnes âgées dépendantes) in France. Korian has nursing homes in six European countries (France, Germany, Belgium, Italy, Spain and Netherlands).

== History ==
Korian is the result of the merging of the corresponding companies Finagest and Serience in 2003.

== Criticisms ==
=== COVID-19 epidemic ===
On 4 April 2020 an investigation by France Inter revealed grave shortcomings in a Korian EHPAD in Clamart, where Korian refused to acknowledge the existence of COVID-19 cases.

At the same date, the number of deceased from COVID-19 in another EHPAD managed by Korian in Mougins amounted to 29 people among 110 residents. According to the president of the Alpes-Maritimes department, this residence had almost as many victims as all the department.

On 19 April Libération revealed that 511 residents died from COVID-19 in EHPAD managed by Korian since 1 March, adding that the death toll was probably higher because residents deceased at hospital were not included in these figures.

On 26 April Sophie Boissard, Korian CEO, announced 606 deceased in EHPADs managed by Korian.

On 19 May a joint criminal investigation was started following families complaints about several EHPADs in Hauts-de-Seine.
