= Alonzo de Santa Cruz =

Spanish cartographer and mapmaker

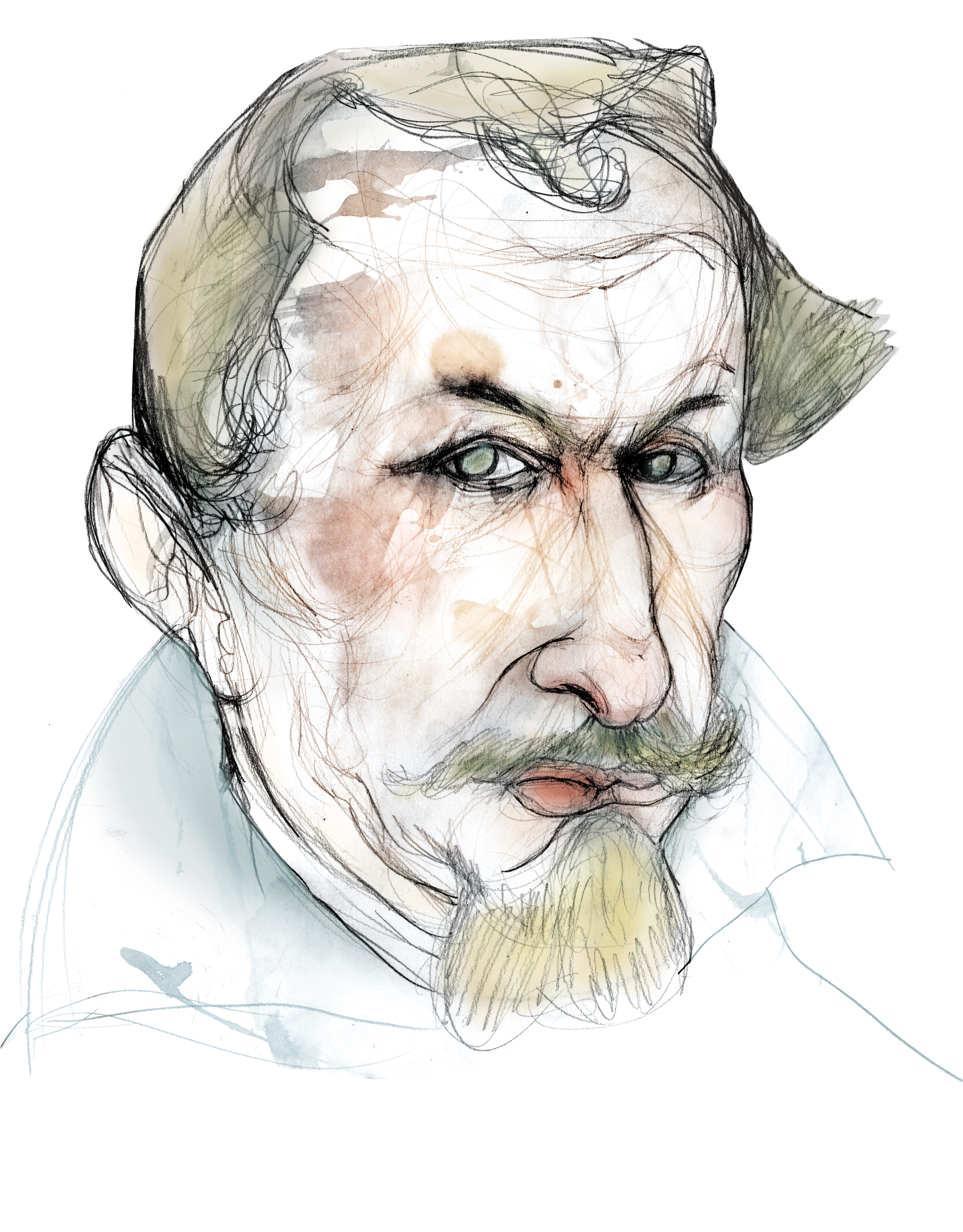
- Sketch of Alonso de Santa Cruz, from the Spanish Foundation for Science and Technology
- Born: 1505; Seville
- Died: 1567 (aged 61–62); Madrid
- Known for: First map of magnetic variations from true north, new nautical instruments
- Children: Antonio Ponce de Santa Cruz
- Scientific career
- Fields: Cartography, astronomy, cosmography, history, education, scientific instruments, navigation

Alonzo de Santa Cruz (or Alonso, Alfonso) (1505 – 1567) was a Spanish cartographer, mapmaker, instrument maker, historian and teacher. He was born about 1505, and died in November 1567. His maps were inventoried in 1572.

Alonzo de Santa Cruz was a renowned cartographer on the Consejo de Indias (Council of the Indies) and a cosmographer at the Casa de Contratación (House of Trade). There, he worked on the Padrón Real, a Spanish map documenting the discoveries in the New World.

Alonzo de Santa Cruz, described cosmography as a way of making a painting of the earth, "because (gra)phia is the same as painting and cosmos is world"

In 1530, Alonzo de Santa Cruz produced the first map of magnetic variations from true north. He believed it would be of use in finding the correct longitude. Alonzo de Santa Cruz designed new nautical instruments, was interested in navigational methods, and wrote about John Cabot's method for finding longitude which made use of the declination of the sun, observed with the quadrant.

Alonzo also taught astronomy and cosmography in the court of Charles V. Alonzo then wrote a five-volume biography about Charles V which described some of the Spanish atrocities in the New World. This upset Charles' son, Phillip II, and so Phillip removed three chapters of the biography.

He also produced the Islario general de todas las islas del mundo (sometimes called the Islario General), a map and document describing the world's islands, at the request of King Philip II in 1542. He also continued Hernando del Pulgar's work titled, History of the Catholic Monarchs.

== See also ==
- History of Cartography
