= Jean-Christophe Bouvier =

French senior civil servant

Prefect of Saint-Pierre and Miquelon
- In office 31 July 2014 – 3 March 2016
- Preceded by: Patrice Latron
- Succeeded by: Henri Jean

Prefect of Cher
- In office 5 February 2020 – July 2022
- Preceded by: Catherine Ferrier
- Succeeded by: François Pesneau

Prefect of Martinique
- In office 23 August 2022 – Present
- Preceded by: Stanislas Cazelles

Personal details
- Born: November 15, 1966 (age 59) Vienne, Isère
- Awards: Knight of the National Order of Merit, Knight of the Legion of Honour

Jean-Christophe Bouvier (born 15 November 1966 in Vienne, Isère) is a French senior civil servant who has served as the Prefect of Martinique since August 2022.

== Career ==
Bouvier is a graduate of the Institut d’Études Politiques de Paris and the École nationale d'administration (ENA).

He served as Prefect of Saint-Pierre and Miquelon from July 2014 to March 2016, and later as Prefect of Cher from February 2020 to July 2022.

On 23 August 2022, he was appointed Prefect of Martinique, succeeding Stanislas Cazelles.

== Honours ==
- Knight of the National Order of Merit (2015)
- Knight of the Legion of Honour (2023)
