= Bait Act =

Bait Acts were laws passed in Newfoundland to try to control the sale of bait to French fishermen, and later to Canadian and American fishermen.

== History ==
In the 1800s France claimed exclusive rights to fish along the shores of Newfoundland, and to cure the fish on the shores. Newfoundland was a British colony, but Britain had other priorities when negotiating fishing rights, and did little to protect the Newfoundland fishery.

In 1857 Britain signed an agreement allowing the French jurisdiction over an area of the shoreline where the fish were cured, and giving them the right to run off any vessels that were impeding their fishing activities.

To minimize this interference in their own fishery, the Newfoundland Assembly introduced the first Bait Act in 1886, making it illegal to sell bait to French fishermen, but Britain refused to give its required agreement until this act was modified in 1887. This Act and subsequent variations did not appreciably curtail the fishing activities of the French, who were able to find alternative supplies.

During the 1890s, after Canadian interference led Britain to veto a trade agreement with the United States, Newfoundland tried to use Bait Act provisions to influence and regulate the sale of bait to Canadian fishermen. In the early 20th century, the Bait Act was directed against American fishermen.
