= Les voyages aventureux du Capitaine Martin de Hoyarsabal, habitant du çubiburu =

1579 mariner's handbook by Martin de Hoyarçabal

Les voyages aventureux du Capitaine Martin de Hoyarsabal, habitant du Çubiburu, contenant les règles et enseignements nécessaires à la bonne et seure navigation ("The Adventurous Voyages of Captain Martin de Hoyarsabal, inhabitant of Ciboure, containing the rules and information necessary for good and sure navigation") is a Middle French 'rutter' (from French: routier) by Martin de Hoyarçabal, from the French Basque Country. It was one of the earlier navigational guides or pilot books, whose purpose was to show sailors how to navigate various European and New World coastlines. See also fr:Routier (instructions nautiques). It was first published in French in 1579, apparently printed in Bordeaux by Jean Chouin.

The only known copy of the 1579 edition was acquired by the French Bibliothèque nationale in c1900. Until then it was thought that the first edition of the book was the 1632 Rouen edition. 11 photostats of the original in the Bibliothèque nationale were printed by the Massachusetts Historical Society, Boston in 1930, most of which are now in libraries in the USA.

According to Michael Barkham it seems certain that the typographic address of the 1579 edition is false, since there was no printer/publisher of the name of Chouin in Bordeaux: rather, the book was printed and published in the Protestant stronghold of La Rochelle by the Protestant printer-publisher and propagandist Jean Portau.

== Editions ==
- (1579) À Bordeaux: Jean Chouin.
- (1662) À Rouen: A L'imprimerie de David du Petit Val, Imprimeur et Librarie ordinaire de sa Majesté
- (1633, twice) À Bordeaux: Guillaume Millanges. (Gallica)
- (1636, 1669) Sevendent à la Rochelle, : Chez les veuves de Paul & Pierre Yvounet, sur la rive. (Archive.org)
- (1677) Librvrv hau da Jxasoco Nabigacionecoa. Martin de Hoyazarbalec, egiña Francezes. Basque edition translated by Pierre Detcheverry, called "Dorre". Bordeaux: Fauvet.
