= Islario General =

1541 geography book by Alonzo de Santa Cruz

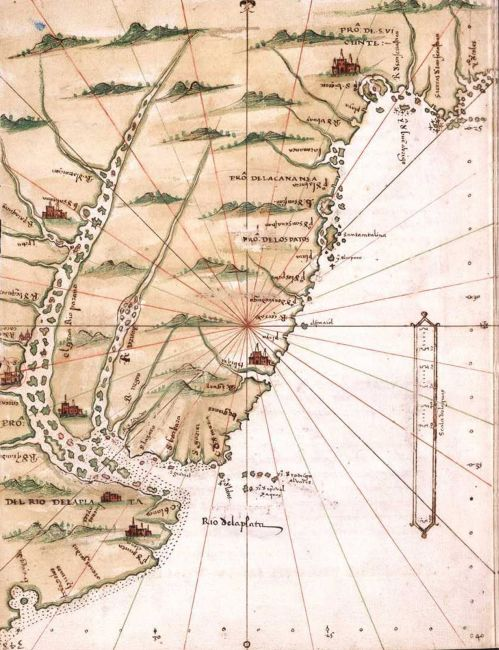
Río de la Plata as it appears in the Islario.

Islario (Note: 'Islario' is a Spanish term without a clear English equivalent. It designates a map or compendium of islands.) general de todas las islas del mundo (1541) is a geography text in four volumes by Alonzo de Santa Cruz about the islands of the world.

== Composition ==
The Islario was a monumental undertaking, composed of eight regional maps and 103 local maps, and a map of Mexico. Some volumes of the work are dedicated to Charles V.

The work contains maps as well as descriptions in prose. It resembles De situ orbis of Pomponius Mela in organization, taking its literary form from the physical layout of the geographic features it describes. A substantial portion of the information Santa Cruz reports is also derived from ancient geographical texts. Sánchez argues that the New World portion of the text was, like a number of other 16th-century works of geography, 'produced to facilitate control and domination of the New World'.

It contains either the first or second account of llamas in Western cartography.

== Archival preservation ==
Three manuscript copies of the Islario are known. One is located in the City Library of Besançon, and two copies are in the Imperial Library of Vienna.

== See also ==
- Benedetto Bordone

== Sources ==
- Portuondo, María M. (2009). Secret Science: Spanish Cosmography and the New World. University of Chicago Press. ISBN 978-0-226-67537-4.
- Stevenson, E. L. (1910). "Review of Die Karten von Amerika in dem Islario General des Alonso de Santa Cruz, Cosmografo Mayor des Kaisers Karl V". The American Historical Review. 15 (2): 392–394. doi:10.2307/1838355. JSTOR 1838355.
