= Jean-Pierre Berçot =

French diplomat

Ambassador of France to Andorra
- In office 2010–2012
- Succeeded by: Gilles Chouraqui

Prefect of Saint-Pierre and Miquelon
- In office 2008–2010
- Preceded by: Yves Fauqueur
- Succeeded by: Jean-Régis Borius

Ambassador of France to Chad
- In office 2003 – November 2006

Deputy High Representative for Bosnia and Herzegovina
- In office 2001–2003

Deputy Prefect of Nogent-le-Rotrou
- In office 1994–1996

Personal details
- Born: 3 November 1947 (age 79) Hanoi, French Indochina (present-day Vietnam)
- Children: 2
- Education: École spéciale militaire de Saint-Cyr
- Awards: Legion of Honour
- Military career
- Allegiance: France
- Branch: French Navy
- Rank: Commander

Jean-Pierre Berçot (French: [ʒɑ̃pjɛʁ bɛʁso]; born 3 November 1947, Hanoi) is a French ambassador and politician. He previously served as ambassador to Chad (2003-2006) and Andorra (2010-2012), as well as prefect of Saint-Pierre and Miquelon (2008-2010). During his career, he visited Madagascar, Comoros, Lebanon, Mali, Burundi, and Colombia as Deputy Head of Mission. He also acted as Prefect of Saint Pierre and Miquelon.

== Career ==
After attending École spéciale militaire de Saint-Cyr in Cambodia, Berçot served in the French Navy, earning the rank of captain in 1980. In 2000, he was made Commander of the Reserve and in 2002 was made Honorary Colonel of the Navy.

Berçot was First Secretary to Madagascar in 1987 and subsequently returned to the country and to Comoros over the next two years on diplomatic missions. Between 1994 and 1996, he was Deputy Prefect of Nogent-le-Rotrou in Eure-et-Loir. He worked as First Embassy Counselor in Burundi in 1996 before traveling to New York City, where he worked at the Permanent Mission of France to the United Nations until 2001, when he became Deputy High Representative for Bosnia and Herzegovina.

He held this role in Mostar in 2003, when he was named Ambassador of France to Chad. On 1 August 2004, he said that France would deploy 200 soldiers to help secure Chad's eastern border with Sudan's conflict-torn Darfur region. He left Chad in 2008 to become Prefect of Saint-Pierre and Miquelon, a role he held for two years. In 2009, whilst Prefect of Saint Pierre and Miquelon, he bestowed an award upon the Royal Canadian Mounted Police for their patrol vessels assisting in recovering a French crew after their ship sank off the coast of Newfoundland and Labrador. He then spent 2010-2012 as Ambassador of France to Andorra.

== Honours ==
Berçot is an Officer in the Legion of Honour.
