= Martin de Hoyarçabal =

French Basque mariner

Martin de Hoyarçabal (Martin Oihartzabal in modern spelling) was a French Basque mariner. Little is generally known about his life. He was born in Ciboure, in the Iparralde, the French Basque Country. He is recognized for publishing one of the first Newfoundland pilots, a book which describes places and distances to aid sailors in navigation, in 1579. Les voyages aventureux du Capitaine Martin de Hoyarsabal, habitant du çubiburu was published in French and was widely used by French and Spanish mariners for almost a century.

== Hoyarçabal's Navigational Pilot ==
The Pilot is the only known extant work by Hoyarçabal. As a reference work, the Navigational Pilot was invaluable for ships traveling in the Newfoundland area. The following is an example taken from Hoyarçabal's work; in this text, Hoyarçabal is giving distances between several places in Newfoundland:

- Gisent cap de S.Marie & Plaisence nord nordest & sud surroest, y a 9. l. Item tu fois sçavoir que quand tu iras du cap de S. Marie, en ceste route de nord nordest, tu trouueras vne poincte longue que se nomme Amigaiz, de la à Plaisence y a 4 lieuës, & du cap de S. Marie 5 lieuës, apres que tu auras passé ledict Amigaiz, tu trouueras Plaisence.
- With Cape S. Marie & Plaisence lying north northeast & south southeast, go 9 leagues. Further, you should know that when you will go from Cape S. Marie, along this route of north northwest, you will find a long point which is named Amigaiz, from which to Plaisence go 4 leagues, & from Cape S. Marie 5 leagues, after which you will have passed the aforementioned Amigaiz, you will find Plaisence.

In 1677, Pierre Detcheverry translated and expanded the Navigational Pilot into Labourdin Basque. The following is the corresponding passage:

- Halaber Iaquinbeharduçu Ioatençarenean arrutahortan causitucoduçula puntabat ceñary baitaritça punta Mehea eta handican placençarat dire, 5. lecoa handy eta punta mehitican bururat, 4. l. noizere iragaten baituçu punta mehea handic lehenbicico baian içanenda placença istriborreco aldearequin.
- Present day Basque: Halaber jakin behar duzu joaten zarenean erruta horretan kausituko duzula punta bat, zeinari baiteritza Punta Mehea eta handik(an) Plazentzara(t) dira 5. legoa handi eta Punta Mehitik(an) burura(t), 4. l. noiz ere iragaten baituzu Punta Mehea handik lehenbiziko baian izanen da Plazentza istriborreko aldearekin.
- "Anyway, you have to know when you go that route that you will find a point which is called point Mehea and from there to Placença, 5 leagues from there and from point Mehea to the cape, 4 leagues because you pass point Mehea soon Placença will be in the first bay at the starboard side".
