= Andrée-Rosemon Hospital =

Hospital in Cayenne, French Guinea

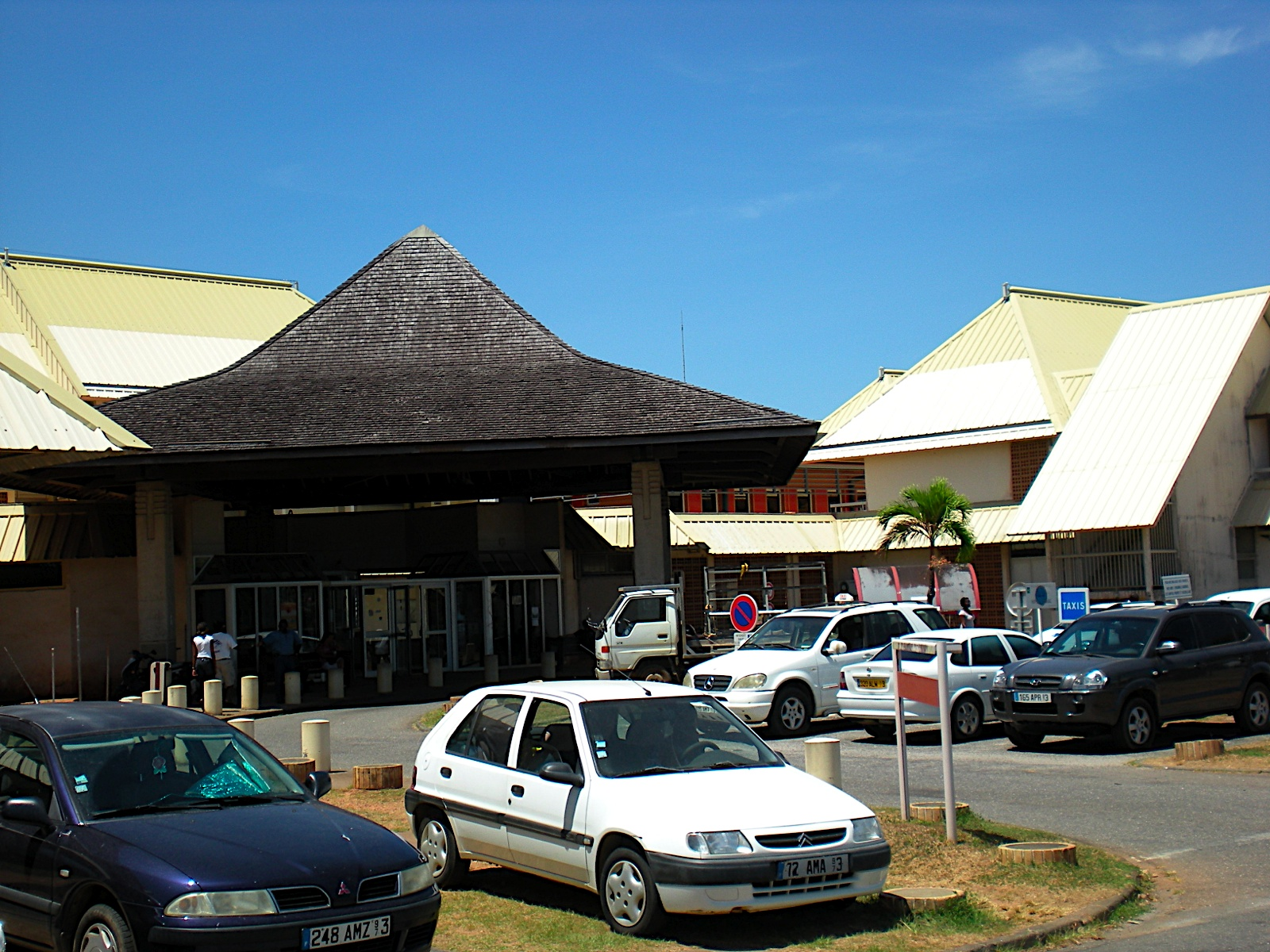
- Main entrance to Andrée-Rosemon Hospital

Geography
- Location: Cayenne, French Guiana, France
- Coordinates: 4.923561°N 52.320607°W

Services
- Beds: 747

History
- Founded: 1992

Links
- Website: ch-cayenne.fr
- Lists: Hospitals in France
- Other links: Hospitals in French Guiana

Andrée-Rosemon Hospital (French: Centre Hospitalier de Cayenne Andrée Rosemon) is a hospital in Cayenne, French Guiana. With 747 beds, it is the largest and only full-service hospital in the overseas department and region of French Guiana.

The hospital is located in the Madeleine district of Cayenne. In 1974 a central kitchen and laundry opened at the site. In 1977 a psychiatric hospital was added, and in 1992 the area was further extended with a hospital as a replacement for the Saint-Denis hospital which has become a nursing training institute. In 2007 a nursing home (EHPAD) was added to the terrain. The hospital was named after Andrée Rosemon, the first general nurse of the Cayenne hospital center.

The hospital manages 18 prevention and care centres across the region and has as of 2017, 250 doctors and a total staff of 2,175 employees. The intensive care capacity as of 10 April 2020 is 38 beds.
