= Antonio Ponce de Santa Cruz =

Court physician in royal courts of Philip III and Philip IV

Antonio Ponce de Santa Cruz (1561–1632) was the court physician in the royal courts of Philip III and Philip IV.

Antonio was also a university professor at the University of Valladolid and a clergyman. He was interested in lycanthropy, free will, and the role of love in causing madness.

He published his father Alonso's book Dignotio et cura affectuum melancholicorum (Diagnóstico y tratamiento de las afecciones de los melancólicos) about the diagnosis and treatment of melancholy posthumously in 1622. He published the first Spanish treatise on epilepsy in 1631, Praelections Valliosoletanae.

Some have suggested that Antonio was friendly with Miguel de Cervantes, given their mutual interests and similarities in the condition described in Cervantes' book El Licenciado Vidriera (the lawyer of glass), and those in Antonio's book on melancholy.
