= Marc Del Grande =

French official

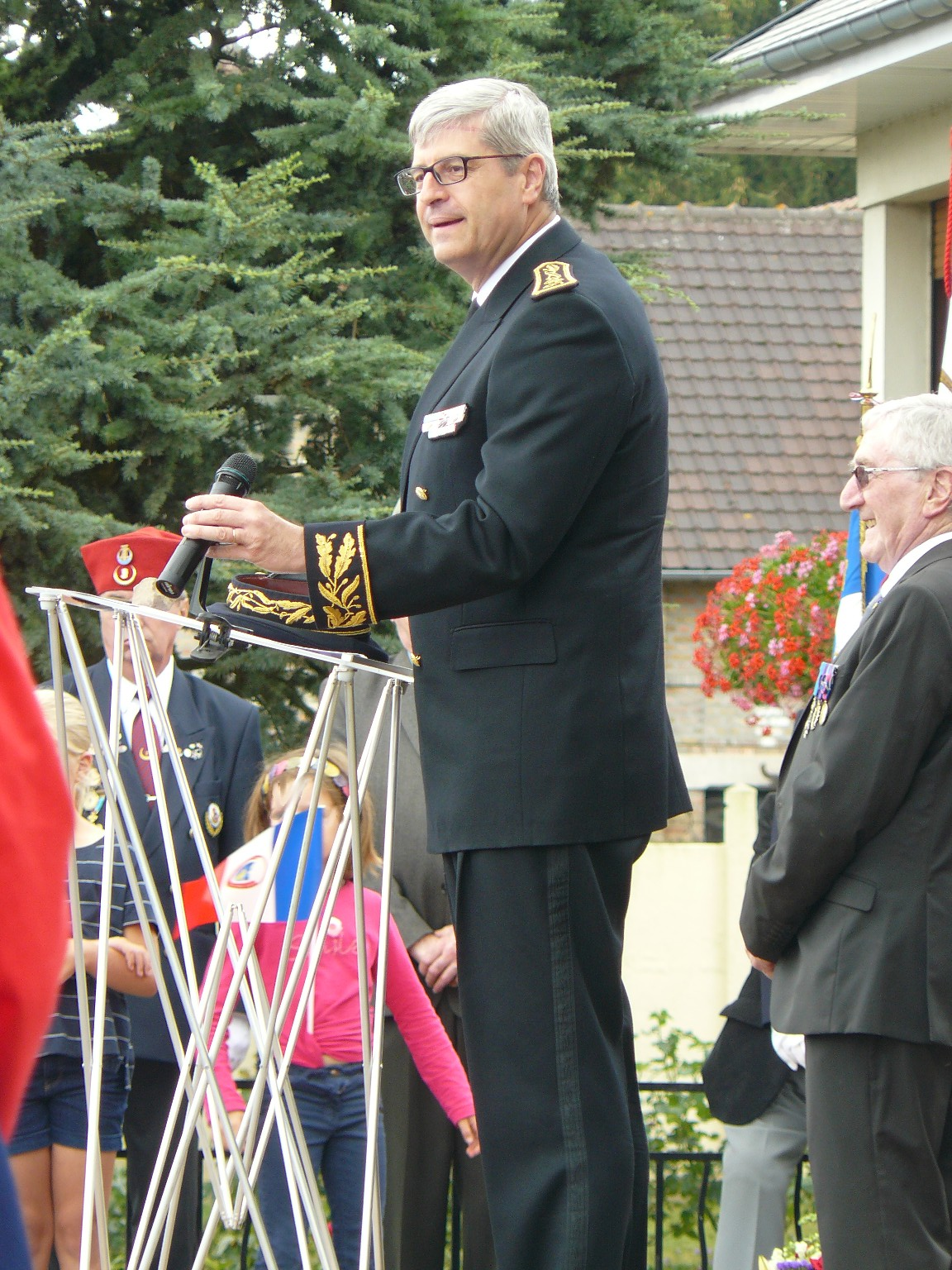

Prefect of French Guiana
- In office 5 August 2019 – 25 November 2020
- Preceded by: Patrice Faure
- Succeeded by: Thierry Queffelec

Personal details
- Born: 15 March 1965 (age 61) Laxou, Meurthe-et-Moselle, France

Marc Del Grande (born 15 March 1965) is a French senior civil servant and was the Prefect of French Guiana.

Marc Del Grande was born in Laxou and graduated at the Special Military School of Saint-Cyr. Between 1991 and 1992, Del Grande was a military observer of the United Nations in Cambodia in the Khmer-held Angkor region. Between 1999 and 2001, Del Grande was the commander of the Gendarmerie of Saint-Laurent-du-Maroni in French Guiana. Between 21 July 2015 and June 2019, Del Grande was appointed as the Secretary General and Sub Prefect of Pas-de-Calais. On 5 August 2019, Del Grande became the Prefect of French Guiana. On 25 November 2020, Grande was replaced by Thierry Queffelec as Prefect.
