= Établissement d'hébergement pour personnes âgées dépendantes =

French residential care for senior citizens

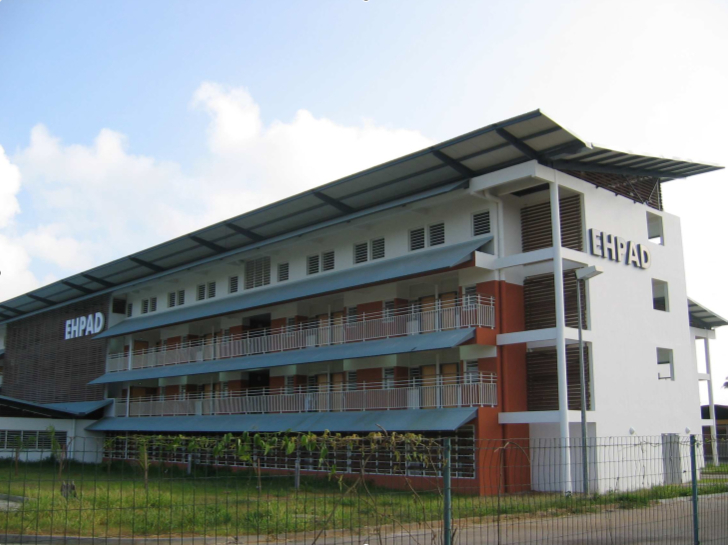
EHPAD in Cayenne, French Guiana

An Établissement d'hébergement pour personnes âgées dépendantes (also called EHPAD) is the most widespread type of French residential care for senior citizens.

== History ==
After World War II residential care homes for senior citizens were called hospices. A French law of 3 June 1975 changed the designation to maison de retraite (retirement home), partly because the old terminology had become derogatory. Another reform in 1999 created the new term Établissement d'hébergement pour personnes âgées dépendantes (EHPAD).

== Operation ==
EHPADs can be public or privately owned. In 2017 of a total of 7000 in France 40% were public, 30% belonged to non-commercial organizations and 30% belonged to the private sector.

The largest private groups managing EHPAD in France in 2020 were:

- Korian, with approximately 25,000 beds
- Orpea, with approximately 20,000 beds
- DomusVi, with approximately 17,000 beds.

== Residents ==
The level of dependency of seniors in EHPADs is high: in 2011, more than 40% of residents had Alzheimer's disease, and three quarters had a cardiovascular disease.

=== Dependency levels ===
A standardized scale determines the level of dependency of a resident. This scale called GIR (groupe iso-ressources) has the following values:

- GIR 1 : Total mental and physical dependency
- GIR 2 : High mental and physical dependency
- GIR 3 : Physical dependency
- GIR 4 : Partial physical dependency
- GIR 5 : Moderate dependency
- GIR 6 : No dependency

== Costs ==
The cost for a resident can be high. According to a 2010 KPMG study the mean cost of one day for an EHPAD place is €49 for accommodation and €24 for care.
