= 2017 local electoral calendar =

List of subnational elections

This local electoral calendar for 2017 lists the subnational elections held in 2017. Referendums, recall and retention elections, and national by-elections (special elections) are also included.

== January ==
- 8 January: India, Maharashtra, Municipal Councils and Town Councils (4th phase)
- 19 January: Nauru, Ubenide, Parliamentary by-election
- 22 January:
  - Tanzania, Dimani, National Assembly by-election
  - Zimbabwe, Bikita West, House of Assembly by-election
- 23 January: Trinidad and Tobago, Tobago, House of Assembly
- 27–28 January: Czech Republic, Most, Senate (revote)
- 28 January: Ivory Coast, District 92 and District 126, National Assembly by-elections
- 29 January:
  - Haiti, Communal Boards (CASEC), Communal Assemblies (ASEC) and City Delegates (DV)
  - Japan, Gifu, Governor
- 31 January: Bangladesh, Tangail-4, House of the Nation by-election

== February ==
- 1 February: India, Nagaland, ~~Urban Local Bodies~~ (election nullified)
- 4 February: India
  - Amritsar, House of the People by-election
  - Goa, Legislative Assembly
  - Punjab, Legislative Assembly
- 5 February: Austria, Graz, City Council, City Senate, District Councils and Migrant Advisory Board
- 11 February:
  - India, Uttar Pradesh, Legislative Assembly (1st phase)
  - Nigeria, Yobe, Local Government Councils and Chairmen
- 12 February:
  - Mauritius, Rodrigues, Regional Assembly
  - Switzerland
    - Aargau, referendums
    - Basel-Stadt, referendums
    - Grisons, referendum
    - Neuchâtel, referendums
    - Schwyz, referendums
    - Thurgau, referendum
    - Ticino, referendums
    - Vaud, referendum
- 13 February: India, Odisha, District Councils, Township Councils and Village Councils (1st phase)
- 14 February: United States, Oklahoma City, City Council (1st round)
- 15 February:
  - India
    - Odisha, District Councils, Township Councils and Village Councils (2nd phase)
    - Uttar Pradesh, Legislative Assembly (2nd phase)
    - Uttarakhand, Legislative Assembly
  - Indonesia, Governors, Regents and Mayors
    - Jakarta, Governor (1st round)
- 16 February: India, Maharashtra, District Councils and Township Councils (1st phase)
- 17 February: India, Odisha, District Councils, Township Councils and Village Councils (3rd phase)
- 19 February: India
  - Odisha, District Councils, Township Councils and Village Councils (4th phase)
  - Uttar Pradesh, Legislative Assembly (3rd phase)
- 21 February: India
  - Maharashtra, District Councils, Township Councils (2nd phase) and Municipal Corporations
    - Mumbai, Municipal Corporation
  - Odisha, District Councils, Township Councils and Village Councils (5th phase)
- 23 February:
  - India, Uttar Pradesh, Legislative Assembly (4th phase)
  - United Kingdom, Copeland and Stoke-on-Trent Central, House of Commons by-elections
- 24 February: Djibouti, Regional Assemblies, Mayors and Communal Assemblies (1st round)
- 25 February:
  - New Zealand, Mount Albert, Parliament by-election
  - Nigeria
    - Gombe, Local Government Councils and Chairmen
    - Taraba, Local Government Councils and Chairmen
- 27 February: India, Uttar Pradesh, Legislative Assembly (5th phase)
- 28 February: Liberia, Lofa-1, House of Representatives by-election

== March ==
- 2 March: United Kingdom, Northern Ireland, Assembly
- 4 March: India
  - Manipur, Legislative Assembly (1st phase)
  - Uttar Pradesh, Legislative Assembly (6th phase)
- 5 March: Switzerland, Valais, Council of State (1st round) and Grand Council
- 7 March:
  - Federated States of Micronesia, Chuuk, Governor, House of Representatives and Senate
  - United States, Los Angeles, Mayor and City Council (1st round)
- 8 March: India
  - Manipur, Legislative Assembly (2nd phase)
  - Uttar Pradesh, Legislative Assembly (7th phase)
- 11 March: Australia, Western Australia, Legislative Assembly and Legislative Council
- 12 March: Switzerland, Solothurn, Executive Council (1st round) and Cantonal Council
- 17 March: Djibouti, Regional Assemblies, Mayors and Communal Assemblies (2nd round)
- 19 March: Switzerland, Valais, Council of State (2nd round)
- 22 March: Bangladesh, Gaibandha-1, National Parliament by-election
- United States, Louisiana, Circuit Courts of Appeal (1st round)
- 26 March:
  - Germany, Saarland, Parliament
  - Japan, Chiba, Governor
- 27 March: Antigua and Barbuda, Barbuda, Council
- 30 March: Bangladesh
  - Sunamganj-2, House of the Nation by-election
  - Comilla, Mayor and City Corporation

== April ==
- 1 April: Myanmar
  - Ann, Chaungzon, Dagon Seikkan, East Dagon, Hlaingthaya, Kawhmu, Kyethi, Mong Hsu and Monywa, House of Representatives by-elections
  - Bago constituency 4, Chin constituency 3 and Yangon constituency 6, House of Nationalities by-elections
- 2 April: Switzerland, Neuchâtel, Council of State and Grand Council
- 3 April: Canada, Calgary Heritage, Calgary Midnapore, Markham—Thornhill, Ottawa—Vanier and Saint-Laurent, House of Commons by-elections
- 4 April:
  - Greenland, Municipal Councils and Settlement Councils
  - United States
    - Anchorage, Assembly
    - Colorado Springs, City Council
    - Las Vegas, City Council (1st round)
    - Oklahoma City, City Council (2nd round)
    - St. Louis, Mayor and Board of Aldermen
    - Wisconsin, Superintendent of Public Instruction, Supreme Court and Court of Appeals
- 8 April: U.S. Virgin Islands, St. Thomas/St. John district, Parliament special election
- 9 April:
  - Finland, Municipal Councils
  - India, Srinagar, House of the People by-election
  - Japan, Akita, Governor
- 11 April: United States, Kansas's 4th congressional district, U.S. House of Representatives special election
- 12 April:
  - India, Malappuram, House of the People by-election
  - South Korea, Sangju-Gunwi-Uiseong-Cheongsong, National Assembly by-election
  - Uganda, Kamuli, Parliament by-election
- 19 April: Indonesia, Jakarta, Governor (2nd round)
- 22 April: Nigeria, Ebonyi, Local Government Councils and Chairmen
- 23 April:
  - India, Delhi, Municipal Corporations
  - Japan, Nagoya, Mayor
  - Switzerland, Solothurn, Executive Council (2nd round)
- 29 April: United States, Louisiana, Circuit Courts of Appeal (2nd round)
- 30 April: Switzerland
  - Appenzell Innerrhoden, Landsgemeinde
  - Vaud, Council of State (1st round) and Grand Council

== May ==
- 4 May:
  - India, Mizoram, Mara Autonomous District, Council
  - United Kingdom, Local elections
    - England, County Councils, Unitary Authorities, Metropolitan Borough Council and Mayors
      - Buckinghamshire, County Council
      - Cambridgeshire, Mayor and County Council
      - Cornwall, Council
      - Cumbria, County Council
      - Derbyshire, County Council
      - Devon, County Council
      - Dorset, County Council
      - Durham, County Council
      - East Sussex, County Council
      - Essex, County Council
      - Gloucestershire, County Council
      - Greater Manchester, Mayor
      - Hampshire, County Council
      - Hertfordshire, County Council
      - Isle of Wight, Council
      - Isles of Scilly, Council
      - Kent, County Council
      - Lancashire, County Council
      - Leicestershire, County Council
      - Lincolnshire, County Council
      - Liverpool City Region, Mayor
      - Norfolk, County Council
      - North Yorkshire, County Council
      - Northamptonshire, County Council
      - Northumberland, County Council
      - Nottinghamshire, County Council
      - Oxfordshire, County Council
      - Shropshire, Council
      - Somerset, County Council
      - Staffordshire, County Council
      - Suffolk, County Council
      - Surrey, County Council
      - Tees Valley City Region, Mayor
      - Warwickshire, County Council
      - West of England, Mayor
      - West Midlands, Mayor
      - West Sussex, County Council
      - Wiltshire, Council
      - Worcestershire, County Council
    - Scotland, Councils
    - Wales, Councils
- 6 May:
  - Australia, Tasmania, (Launceston, Murchison and Rumney) Legislative Council
  - Maldives, City Councils, Atoll Councils and Island Councils
  - United States
    - Arlington, Mayor and City Council (1st round)
    - Dallas, City Council (1st round)
    - El Paso, Mayor and City Council (1st round)
    - Fort Worth, Mayor and City Council (1st round)
    - San Antonio, Mayor and City Council (1st round)
- 7 May:
  - Germany, Schleswig-Holstein, Parliament
  - Italy, Aosta Valley and Trentino-Alto Adige/Südtirol, Mayors and Municipal Councils
  - Switzerland, Glarus, Landsgemeinde
- 9 May:
  - Canada, British Columbia, Legislative Assembly
  - United States, Omaha, Mayor and City Council
- 13 May: Palestine, West Bank, Municipal Councils (1st round)
- 14 May:
  - Abkhazia, Gudauta, People's Assembly by-election
  - Armenia, Yerevan, City Council
  - Germany, North Rhine-Westphalia, Parliament
  - Nepal, Mayors, Deputy Mayors, Ward Chairs and Ward Members (1st phase)
- 16 May: United States, Los Angeles, City Council (2nd round)
- 17 May: Cook Islands, Avatiu-Ruatonga-Palmerston, Parliament by-election
- 19 May: Iran, City Councils and Village Councils
  - Tehran, City Council
- 21 May:
  - Croatia, County Prefects, County Councils, Mayors and Municipal Councils (1st round)
  - India, Bihar, Municipal Corporations, Municipal Councils and Town Councils (1st phase)
  - Switzerland
    - Aargau, referendum
    - Basel-Landschaft, referendums
    - Basel-Stadt, referendums
    - Bern, referendums
    - Fribourg, referendum
    - Geneva, referendums
    - Lucerne, referendums
    - Obwalden, referendums
    - Schaffhausen, referendums
    - Schwyz, referendums
    - Solothurn, referendum
    - Ticino, referendum
    - Uri, referendum
    - Valais, referendum
    - Vaud, Council of State (2nd round)
    - Zug, referendums
    - Zürich, referendums
- 25 May: United States, Montana's at-large congressional district, U.S. House of Representatives special election
- 27 May: Canada, Métis Nation-Saskatchewan, President
- 30 May: Canada, Nova Scotia, House of Assembly

== June ==
- 3 June:
  - Latvia, Municipal Councils
    - Riga, City Council
  - Nigeria, Benue, Local Government Councils and Chairmen
  - United States, Cherokee Nation, Tribal Council (1st round)
- 4 June:
  - Argentina, La Rioja, Provincial Legislature
  - Cambodia, Commune Chiefs and Commune Councils
  - Croatia, County Prefects, County Councils, Mayors and Municipal Councils (2nd round)
  - India, Bihar, Municipal Corporations, Municipal Councils and Town Councils (2nd phase)
  - Mexico, State elections
    - Coahuila, Governor, Congress, Mayors and Municipal Councils
    - Mexico State, Governor
    - Nayarit, Governor, Congress, Mayors and Municipal Councils
    - Veracruz, Mayors and Municipal Councils
- 6 June: United States, California's 34th congressional district, U.S. House of Representatives special election
- 7 June: India, Bihar, Municipal Corporations, Municipal Councils and Town Councils (3rd phase)
- 8 June: United Kingdom, Scotland, Ettrick, Roxburgh and Berwickshire, Scottish Parliament by-election
- 10 June: United States
  - Arlington, City Council (2nd round)
  - Dallas, City Council (2nd round)
  - El Paso, Mayor and City Council (2nd round)
  - Fort Worth, City Council (2nd round)
  - San Antonio, Mayor and City Council (2nd round)
- 11 June:
  - India, Goa, Village Councils (1st phase)
  - Italy, Mayors and Municipal Councils (1st round)
- 13 June: United States, Las Vegas, City Council (2nd round)
- 17 June: India, Assam, Karbi Anglong, Autonomous Council
- 18 June: Switzerland, Bernese Jura, Moutier, Join the Canton of Jura referendum
- 20 June: United States, Georgia's 6th congressional district and South Carolina's 5th congressional district, U.S. House of Representatives special elections
- 25 June:
  - Italy, Mayors and Municipal Councils (2nd round)
  - Japan, Shizuoka, Governor
- 28 June: Nepal, Mayors, Deputy Mayors, Ward Chairs and Ward Members (2nd phase)
- 29 June: Uganda, Kyadondo East, Parliament by-election

== July ==
- 1 July:
  - India, Goa, Village Councils (2nd phase)
  - Nigeria, Jigawa, Local Government Councils and Chairmen
- 2 July: Japan
  - Hyōgo, Governor
  - Tokyo, Metropolitan Assembly
- 8 July: Nigeria, Osun West, Senate by-election
- 15 July:
  - Nigeria, Kebbi, Local Government Councils and Chairmen
  - Pakistan, NA-260, National Assembly by-election
- 16 July:
  - Republic of the Congo, Departmental Councils and Municipal Councils (1st round)
  - Zimbabwe, Chiwundura, National Assembly by-election
- 18 July: Syria, Saraqib, City Council
- 19 July: Tuvalu, Vaitupu, Parliament by-election
- 22 July:
  - Nigeria, Lagos, Local Government Councils and Chairmen
  - United States, Cherokee Nation, Tribal Council (2nd round)
- 23 July: Argentina, Chaco, Chamber of Deputies
- 26 July: Saint Helena, Ascension and Tristan da Cunha, Saint Helena, Legislative Council
- 29 July: Palestine, West Bank, Municipal Councils (2nd round)
- 30 July:
  - Republic of the Congo, Departmental Councils and Municipal Councils (2nd round)
  - Japan, Yokohama, Mayor

== August ==
- 6 August: Brazil, Amazonas, Governor special election (1st round)
- 8 August: Kenya, Governors and County Assemblies
- 15 August: Jordan, Governorate Councils, Mayors and Municipal Councils
- 17 August: Cook Islands, Ivirua, Parliament by-election
- 26 August: Australia, Northern Territory, Mayors, City Councils, Town Councils, Regional Councils and Shire Councils
- 27 August:
  - Brazil, Amazonas, Governor special election (2nd round)
  - Japan, Ibaraki, Governor
- 29 August: United States, Phoenix, City Council
- 31 August: Uganda, Kalungu, Parliament by-election

== September ==
- 3 September: Chile, Easter Island, Referendum
- 9 September: Australia, New South Wales, Mayors, Regional Councils, City Councils and Shire Councils
- 10 September: Russia, State Duma by-elections, Federal Subject Heads, Federal Subject Legislatures, Municipal Heads, Municipal Councils, District Councils, Village Councils and Local referendums
  - Belgorod Oblast, Governor
  - Bryansk Oblast, District 77, State Duma by-election
  - Buryatia, Head
  - Kaliningrad Oblast, Governor
  - Karelia (Republic), Head
  - Kirov Oblast, Governor
  - Krasnodar Krai, Legislative Assembly
  - Leningrad Oblast, District 112, State Duma by-election
  - Mari El, Head
  - Mordovia, Head
  - Moscow, Municipal Councils
  - North Ossetia–Alania, Parliament
  - Novgorod Oblast, Governor
  - Penza Oblast, Legislative Assembly
  - Perm Krai, Governor
  - Ryazan Oblast, Governor
  - Sakhalin Oblast, Duma
  - Saratov Oblast, Governor and Duma
  - Sevastopol, Governor
  - Sverdlovsk Oblast, Governor
  - Tomsk Oblast, Governor
  - Udmurtia, Head and State Council
  - Yaroslavl Oblast, Governor
- 11 September: Norway, Sámi Parliament
- 17 September:
  - Pakistan, NA-120, National Assembly by-election
  - Switzerland, Bernese Jura, Belprahon and Sorvilier, Join the Canton of Jura referendum
- 18 September: Nepal, Mayors, Deputy Mayors, Ward Chairs and Ward Members (3rd phase)
- 22 September: Syria, Rojava, Communes
- 24 September:
  - Germany
    - Berlin, Tegel Airport referendum
    - Bremen, Extension of Parliamentary Term Length referendum
    - Duisburg, Lord Mayor
  - Switzerland
    - Basel-Landschaft, referendums
    - Geneva, referendum
    - Lucerne, referendum
    - Neuchâtel, referendums
    - Schaffhausen, referendums
    - Schwyz, referendums
    - Solothurn, referendum
    - Ticino, referendums
    - Uri, referendums
    - Zürich, referendums
- 25 September: Iraq, Kurdistan Region, Independence Referendum
- 26 September: Canada, Newfoundland and Labrador, Mayors and City Councils
- 30 September: Lesotho
  - Hololo, Thupa-Kubu and Teyateyaneng, National Assembly by-elections
  - Municipal Councils and Community Councils

== October ==
- 1 October:
  - Austria, Burgenland, Mayors (1st round) and Municipal Councils
  - Portugal, Municipal Chambers, Municipal Assemblies and Parish Assemblies
  - Spain, Catalonia, Independence Referendum
- 3 October: United States, Albuquerque, Mayor and City Council (1st round)
- 7 October: India, Manipur, District Councils, Township Councils and Village Councils
- 8 October:
  - Argentina, Corrientes, Governor, Chamber of Deputies, Senate, Mayors and Municipal Councils
  - Luxembourg, Communal Councils
- 10 October: United States, Raleigh, Mayor (1st round) and City Council
- 11 October: India, Gurdaspur, House of the People by-election
- 14 October: United States, Louisiana, Public Service Commission, Treasurer special election (1st round) and Circuit Courts of Appeal
  - New Orleans, Mayor and City Council (1st round)
- 14–15 October: Republic of Macedonia, Mayors and Municipal Councils (1st round)
- 15 October:
  - Austria, Tyrol, 2026 Olympics Bid referendum
  - Estonia, Municipal Councils
  - Germany, Lower Saxony, Parliament
  - Venezuela, Governors
- 16 October: Canada, Alberta, Mayors and Municipal Councils
  - Calgary, Mayor, City Council and School Trustees
  - Edmonton, Mayor, City Council and School Trustees
- 17 October: Malawi, Lilongwe City South East, Lilongwe Msozi North and Nsanje Lalanje, National Assembly by-elections
- 21 October:
  - Australia
    - Christmas Island, Shire Council
    - Cocos (Keeling) Islands, Shire Council
    - Western Australia, Mayors, Regional Councils, City Councils and Shire Councils
  - Georgia, Mayors and Municipal Councils
- 22 October:
  - Argentina
    - Buenos Aires, Chamber of Deputies, Senate and Municipal Councils
    - Buenos Aires City, City Legislature
    - Catamarca, Chamber of Deputies and Senate
    - Corrientes, Mayors and Municipal Councils
    - Formosa, Chamber of Deputies
    - Jujuy, Provincial Legislature
    - Mendoza, Chamber of Deputies and Senate
    - Misiones, House of Representatives
    - Salta, Chamber of Deputies and Senate
    - San Luis, Chamber of Deputies, Senate and Referendum
    - Santiago del Estero, Governor, Chamber of Deputies, Mayors and Municipal Councils
  - Italy
    - Lombardy, Regional Autonomy referendum
    - Veneto, Regional Autonomy referendum
      - Belluno, Provincial Autonomy referendum
  - Japan
    - Aomori District 4, Ehime District 3 and Niigata District 5, House of Representatives by-elections
    - Miyagi, Governor
  - Kosovo, Mayors (1st round) and Municipal Councils
- 23 October: Canada, Lac-Saint-Jean and Sturgeon River—Parkland, House of Commons by-elections
- 26 October: Pakistan, NA-4, National Assembly by-election
- 27 October: Brazil, Paraná, Rio Grande do Sul and Santa Catarina, South Region Separatist referendum
- 28–29 October: Republic of Macedonia, Mayors and Municipal Councils (2nd round)
- 29 October:
  - Austria, Burgenland, Mayors (2nd round)
  - Brazil, Niterói, Armament of Municipal Guard referendum
- 30 October:
  - Canada, Nunavut, Legislative Assembly
  - Jamaica, Saint Andrew Southern, Saint Andrew South Western and Saint Mary South Eastern, House of Representatives by-elections

== November ==
- 3 November: India, Sikkim, District Councils and Village Councils
- 4 November:
  - Nigeria, Enugu, Local Government Councils and Chairmen
  - Slovakia, Governors and Regional Councils
- 5 November:
  - Canada, Quebec, Mayors and Municipal Councils
    - Montreal, Mayor and City Council
    - Quebec City, Mayor and City Council
  - Italy, Sicily, Regional Assembly
  - Nicaragua, Mayors and Municipal Councils
- 7 November: United States, State and Local elections
  - Utah's 3rd congressional district, U.S. House of Representatives special election
  - Maine, Medicaid Expansion referendum
  - New Jersey, Governor, General Assembly and Senate
  - New York, Pension Forfeiture for Convicted Officials constitutional referendum and Constitutional Convention referendum
  - Ohio, Drug Price Relief referendum
  - Pennsylvania, Supreme Court and Superior Court retention elections, and Supreme Court, Commonwealth Court and Superior Court
  - Virginia, Governor, Lieutenant Governor, Attorney General and House of Delegates
  - Washington, Court of Appeals
  - Atlanta, Mayor and City Council (1st round)
  - Aurora, CO, City Council
  - Boston, Mayor and City Council
  - Charlotte, Mayor and City Council
  - Cincinnati, Mayor and City Council
  - Cleveland, Mayor and City Council
  - Columbus, City Council
  - Detroit, Mayor and City Council
  - Flint, Mayor recall election
  - King County, Executive and Council
    - Seattle, Mayor and City Council
  - Miami, Mayor and City Commission (1st round)
  - Minneapolis, Mayor, City Council, Board of Estimate and Taxation and Park and Recreation Board
  - New York City, Mayor, Comptroller, Public Advocate and City Council
  - Pittsburgh, Mayor and City Council
  - Raleigh, Mayor (2nd round)
  - Tucson, City Council
  - Wichita, City Council
- 9 November: India, Himachal Pradesh, Legislative Assembly
- 11 November:
  - Nigeria, Akwa Ibom, Local Government Councils and Chairmen
  - United States, New York City, Borough Presidents
- 12 November:
  - Equatorial Guinea, Municipal Councils
  - Japan, Hiroshima, Governor
  - Republic of Macedonia, Čair, Mayors and Municipal Councils (3rd round)
- 14 November: United States, Albuquerque, Mayor and City Council (2nd round)
- 18 November:
  - Nigeria
    - Anambra, Governor
    - Kwara, Local Government Councils and Chairmen
  - United States, Louisiana, Treasurer special election (2nd round)
    - New Orleans, Mayor and City Council (2nd round)
- 19 November:
  - Chile, Regional Councils
  - Kosovo, Mayors (2nd round)
- 21 November:
  - Denmark, Regional Councils and Municipal Councils
  - United States, Miami, City Commission (2nd round)
- 22 November: India, Uttar Pradesh, Municipal Corporations, Municipal Councils and Town Councils (1st phase)
- 23 November: Algeria, State Assemblies and Municipal Councils
- 25 November: Australia, Queensland, Legislative Assembly
- 26 November:
  - Cuba, Municipal Assemblies (1st round)
  - Honduras, Mayors and Municipal Councils
  - India, Uttar Pradesh, Municipal Corporations, Municipal Councils and Town Councils (2nd phase)
  - Nepal, Provincial Assemblies (1st round)
  - Switzerland
    - Basel-Landschaft, referendums
    - Neuchâtel, referendums
    - Nidwalden, referendum
    - Obwalden, referendum
    - Schaffhausen, referendums
    - Thurgau, referendum
- 29 November: India, Uttar Pradesh, Municipal Corporations, Municipal Councils and Town Councils (3rd phase)
- 30 November: Saint Helena, Ascension and Tristan da Cunha, Ascension Island, Council by-election

== December ==
- 1 December: Syria, Rojava, Regional Councils, Canton Councils, Area Councils and District Councils
- 2 December: Australia, New England, House of Representatives by-election
- 3 December:
  - Cuba, Municipal Assemblies (2nd round)
  - France, Corsica, Assembly (1st round)
- 5 December: United States, Atlanta, Mayor and City Council (2nd round)
- 7 December: Nepal, Provincial Assemblies (2nd round)
- 9 December: India, Gujarat, Legislative Assembly (1st phase)
- 10 December:
  - France, Corsica, Assembly (2nd round)
  - Venezuela, Mayors
    - Zulia, Governor special election
- 11 December: Canada, Battlefords—Lloydminster, Bonavista—Burin—Trinity, Scarborough—Agincourt and South Surrey—White Rock, House of Commons by-elections
- 12 December: United States, Alabama, U.S. Senate special election
- 14 December: India, Gujarat, Legislative Assembly (2nd phase)
- 16 December: Australia, Bennelong, House of Representatives by-election
- 17 December: India, Punjab, Municipal Corporations, Municipal Councils and Town Councils
- 18 December: Saint Kitts and Nevis, Nevis, Island Assembly
- 21 December:
  - Bangladesh, Rangpur, Mayor and City Corporation
  - Spain, Catalonia, Parliament
- 23 December: Nigeria, Ekiti, Local Government Councils and Chairmen
- 24 December: Uzbekistan, Tashkent, District Councils
