= Rodrigo López Molina =

Argentine politician

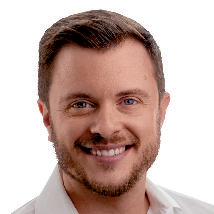

City councilor of Rosario
- Incumbent
- Assumed office December 10, 2017

Provincial Deputy of Santa Fe
- In office December 10, 2015 – December 10, 2017

City councilor of Rosario
- In office December 10, 2011 – December 10, 2015

Personal details
- Born: July 25, 1985 (age 41) Rosario, Santa Fe Province
- Party: Republican Proposal Cambiemos
- Children: Sol María
- Parent(s): Marta and Rodolfo López Molina
- Education: Pontifical Catholic University of Argentina
- Occupation: Politician
- Profession: Attorney and public notary
- Awards: TOYP (2015), (2017)
- Website: http://www.roylopezmolina.com.ar

Rodrigo Manuel “Roy” López Molina (born July 25, 1985 in Rosario, Santa Fe), is an argentine politician, attorney and public notary of the Republican Proposal Party who has been City councilor of the Rosario, Santa Fe since 2017. Before being elected City councilor, he was Provincial Deputy of Province of Santa Fe from 2015 to 2017 and City councilor of Rosario from 2011 to 2015.

== Early life and education ==
López Molina was born and raised in Rosario, Santa Fe Province. In 1988 he attended high school at the Sacred Heart College, where he began his political militancy through catholic youth work and participation in social labors and beneficent activities in poor neighborhoods from Rosario.

He received a bachelor's degree in law from the Pontifical Catholic University of Argentina, in 2008. He completed a Master's degree in economics and law in the University of Buenos Aires, in 2018.

== Political career ==
In 2007 he joined and began his participation in Republican Proposal, where he was appointed as secretary of the local political party.

=== Municipal ===
He was candidate for councilor of the city of Rosario for the alliance Unión PRO Federal, being elected by 111,437 votes, in 2011 Argentine provincial elections. In the same year he has named president of the legislative block of councilors of Unión Pro Federal.

In 2017 he headed the list of candidates for councilors of the city of Rosario for the political coalition Cambiemos, being elected for the second time as councilman of this city by 206.994 votes, in 2017 Argentine provincial elections, representing 37% of the total of votes. This electoral result positioned this political force first for the first time in local elections, with López Molina being the most voted candidate.

At a press conference held in March 2019 in the Larrea neighborhood of Rosario, he officially launched his pre-candidacy for mayor through the Vamos Juntos list for the 2019 provincial elections of argentina.

On April 28, 2019 in the elections primary, open, simultaneous and compulsory (PASO) held in the city of Rosario, López Molina won the first place within the coalition's internal Cambiemos defeating Jorge Boasso, thus remaining the sole candidate for mayor of this political force.

=== Provincial ===
After his four-year term as councilor, he headed the list of candidates for provincial deputies for province of Santa Fe for the alliance Unión PRO Federal. He was elected by 340,772 votes, in 2015 argentine provincial elections, getting 10 seats for the first time for this political force.

He received the TOYP Santa Fe Award in 2015 and 2017 in the "Political, Legal or Government Affairs" category. This award is part of an annual international program of the Junior Chamber International that gives a formal recognition to ten people between 18 and 40 years of age who stand out for their excellence in their fields of work, for their personal achievements, for their community work and contribution to society.

== Legislative work ==
His legislative management as city councilor of Rosario in his first and second mandate focused on the sanction of ordinances and norms related to the economic freedom, the participation of neighbors in matters of public interest, innovation solutions for the problems of the city, the guarantees of criminal procedure and the prosecution of serious crimes such as the money laundering.

He is currently the political delegate of his party at the local level where he makes arrangements through national ministries corresponding to the Ministries of the Argentine Republic by the president of the republic, engineer Mauricio Macri.

=== Esperanto ===
In 2013, people near the dance disco "Esperanto Rosario" achieved its final closure thanks to the complaint filed by López Molina. He took the representation of the neighbors of the aforementioned company before the public bodies, proving that the financing funds came from a dubious legal source, presumably drug trafficking.

Through a project elaborated by López Molina and approved by the congress of the province of Santa Fe, was defined the way in which people with knowledge in the subject of trials of social interest can appear before the court to bring opinions and provide ideas to resolve the case. This civil law bill was called "Friend of the Court" or "AMICUSCURIAE".

=== Los Monos ===
In 2015 Lopez Molina made the request for annulment of the shortened trial to the criminal gang "Los Monos", for which it was intended to leave in unclear circumstances the submission to criminal proceedings of the recognized leaders of the same before the wave of miscellaneous crimes, which led to homicide, which are attributed to it.

Through a project elaborated by López Molina and approved by the congress of the province of Santa Fe, the treatment that the criminal procedure code provides to the abbreviated processes was modified (Law n. 127345), establishing new guidelines and limitations to the judges to avoid their abusive use and in causes socially sensitive.
