= Electoral history of Charles Rangel =

List of elections featuring Charles Rangel as a candidate

This is the Electoral history of Charles Rangel, a Democratic Representative from New York City, who represented the 18th, 19th, 16th, 15th, and 13th districts of New York. Rangel was first elected in November 1970, and was re-elected in every subsequent election. Rangel chose not to run in the 2016 House election, and retired when his term ended in January 2017. At the time of his retirement, he was the second most senior United States Representative, behind representative John Conyers.

New York's 18th congressional district: Results 1970
Year	Subject	Party	Votes	%	Opponent	Party	Votes	%	Opponent	Party	Votes	%	Opponent	Party	Votes	%
1970	Charles Rangel	Democratic, Republican	52,651	87%	Charles Taylor	Liberal	6,385	11%	Bohdan Wasiutynski	Conservative	1,033	2%	Jose Stevens	Communist	347	1%

New York's 19th congressional district: Results 1972–1980
Year	Subject	Party	Votes	%	Opponent	Party	Votes	%	Opponent	Party	Votes	%
1972	Charles Rangel	Democratic, Republican, Liberal	104,427	96%	Marshall Dodge	Conservative	2,517	1%	Jose Stevens	Communist	843	1%
1974	Charles Rangel	Democratic, Republican, Liberal	63,146	97%	Charles Mills	Conservative	2,039	3%				
1976	Charles Rangel	Democratic, Republican, Liberal	91,672	97%	Benton Cole	Conservative	2,169	2%	Helen Halyard	Workers	640	1%
1978	Charles Rangel	Democratic, Republican, Liberal	91,672	96%	F. Freeman Yearling	Conservative	1,648	3%	Kenneth Miliner	Socialist Workers	612	0%
1980	Charles Rangel	Democratic, Republican, Liberal	84,062	96%	Marjorie Garvey	Conservative, Right to Life	2,622	3%	Reba Dixon	Socialist Workers	692	1%

New York's 16th congressional district: Results 1982–1990
Year	Subject	Party	Votes	%	Opponent	Party	Votes	%	Opponent	Party	Votes	%
1982	Charles Rangel	Democratic, Republican, Liberal	76,626	97%	Michael Berns	Conservative	1,261	2%	Veronica Cruz	Socialist Workers	718	1%
1984	Charles Rangel	Democratic, Republican	117,759	97%	Michael Berns	Conservative	2,541	2%	Nan Bailey	Socialist Workers	1,098	1%
1986	Charles Rangel	Democratic, Republican, Liberal	61,262	96%	Michael Berns	Conservative	1,288	2%	William Seraile	New Alliance	995	2%
1988	Charles Rangel	Democratic, Republican, Liberal	107,620	97%	Michael Liccione	Conservative	1,779	2%	Barbara Taylor	New Alliance	1,451	1%
1990	Charles Rangel	Democratic, Republican, Liberal	55,882	97%	Alvaader Frazier	New Alliance	1,592	3%				

New York's 15th congressional district: Results 1992–2010
Year	Subject	Party	Votes	%	Opponent	Party	Votes	%	Opponent	Party	Votes	%	Opponent	Party	Votes	%
1992	Charles Rangel	Democratic, Liberal	105,011	95%	Jose Suero	Conservative	4,345	4%	Jessie Fields	New Alliance	1,337	1%				
1994	Charles Rangel	Democratic, Liberal	77,830	97%	Jose Suero	Right to Life	2,812	3%								
1996	Charles Rangel	Democratic, Liberal	113,898	91%	Edward Adams	Republican	5,951	5%	Ruben Vargas	Conservative, Independence	3,896	3%	Jose Suero	Right to Life	989	1%
1998	Charles Rangel	Democratic, Liberal	90,424	93%	David Cunningham	Republican	5,633	5%	Patrick McManus	Conservative	1,082	1%				
2000	Charles Rangel	Democratic, Liberal	130,161	92%	Jose Suero	Republican	7,346	5%	Dean Loren	Green	2,134	2%	Jessie Fields	Independence	1,051	1%
2002	Charles Rangel	Democratic, Working Families	153,099	91%	Kenneth Jefferson	Republican	12,355	7%	Jessie Fields	Independence	3,345	2%				
2006	Charles Rangel	Democratic, Working Families	103,916	94%	Edward Daniels	Republican	6,592	6%								
2008	Charles Rangel	Democratic, Working Families	177,151	89%	Edward Daniels	Republican	15,676	8%	Craig Schley	Vote People Change	3,708	2%	Martin Koppel	Socialist Workers	2,141	1%
2010	Charles Rangel	Democratic, Working Families	91,225	80%	Michel Faulkner	Republican, Conservative	11,754	10%	Craig Schley	Independence, Vote People Change	7,803	7%	Róger Calero	Socialist Workers	2,647	2%

New York's 13th congressional district: Results 2012–2014
Year	Subject	Party	Votes	%	Opponent	Party	Votes	%	Opponent	Party	Votes	%
2012	Charles Rangel	Democratic, Working Families	175,690	91%	Craig Schley	Republican	12,147	6%	Deborah Liatos	Socialist	5,548	3%
2014	Charles Rangel	Democratic, Working Families	68,396	87%	Daniel Vila	Green	9,806	13%	Kenneth D. Schaefer	Working Families		
