= 2017 New York City Comptroller election =

- November 7, 2017
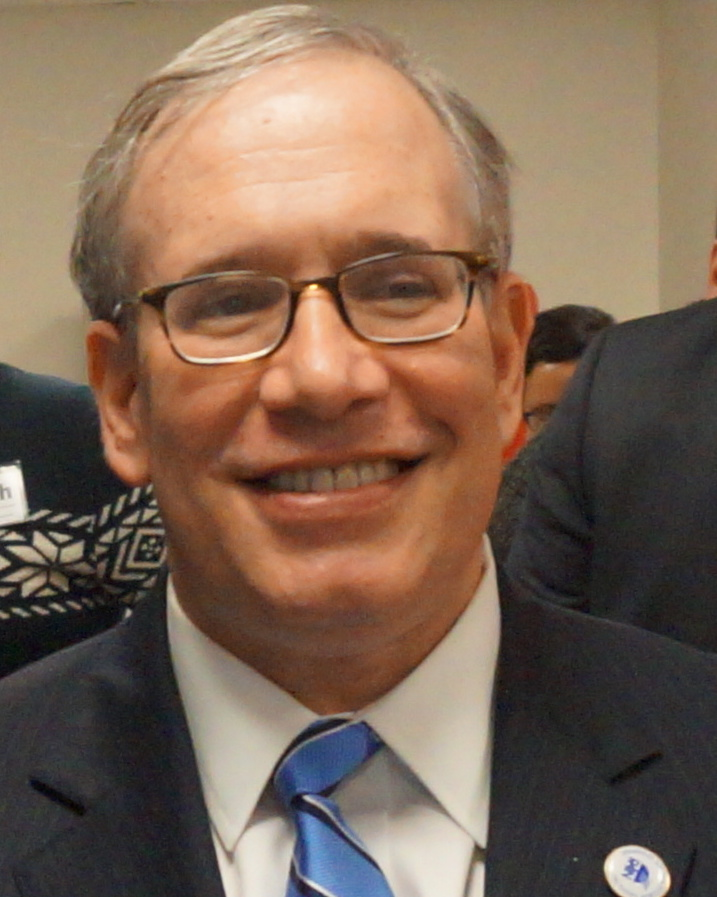

Nominee	Scott Stringer	Michel Faulkner
Party	Democratic	Republican
Alliance	Working Families Party	Conservative
Popular vote	838,944	213,192
Percentage	76.8%	19.5%
- Stringer: 40–50% 50–60% 60–70% 70–80% 80–90% >90% Faulkner: 40–50% 50–60% 60–70% 70–80% 80–90% >90% Tie: 30–40% 40–50% 50% No votes
Comptroller before election
Scott Stringer
Democratic
Elected Comptroller
Scott Stringer
Democratic

The 2017 New York City Comptroller election was held on November 7, 2017, alongside concurrent elections for mayor, Public Advocate, Borough Presidents, and City Council. Neither major party held a primary as incumbent Democrat Scott Stringer and Republican Michel Faulkner were unopposed.

Both major party candidates ran under a number of ballot lines due to New York's fusion voting system that allows more than one political party to nominate the same candidate. Stringer won the general election by more than 50 points and was elected to a second term in office.

== Democratic Party ==
=== Candidates ===
==== Nominee ====
- Scott Stringer, incumbent City Comptroller and former Manhattan Borough President

== Republican Party ==
=== Candidates ===
==== Nominee ====
- Michel Faulkner, former New York Jets football player and Republican nominee for New York's 15th congressional district in 2010

== Third parties and independents ==
=== Working Families Party ===
==== Nominee ====
- Scott Stringer, incumbent City Comptroller and former Manhattan Borough President

=== Conservative Party ===
==== Nominee ====
- Michel Faulkner, former New York Jets football player and Republican nominee for New York's 15th congressional district in 2010

=== Green Party ===
==== Nominee ====
- Julia Willebrand, environmental activist and Green Party nominee for the 2006 New York State Comptroller election

=== Libertarian Party ===
==== Nominee ====
- Alex Merced, marketing consultant and Libertarian nominee for U.S. Senate in 2016

=== Reform Party ===
==== Nominee ====
- Michel Faulkner, former New York Jets football player and Republican nominee for New York's 15th congressional district in 2010

=== Independents ===
==== Declared ====
- Michel Faulkner, former New York Jets football player and Republican nominee for New York's 15th congressional district in 2010 (Note: While Faulkner was a Republican, fusion voting also allowed him to appear on the ballot as an Independent under the party line 'Stop de Blasio'.)

== General election ==
=== Endorsements ===
Scott Stringer (D)

Local officials

- Bill de Blasio, mayor of New York City (2014–2021)

Trade unions

- 32BJ SEIU
- AFL-CIO, New York City Central Labor Council
- Communications Workers of America District 1
- Council of School Supervisors & Administrators
- District Council 37
- Retail, Wholesale and Department Store Union

Organizations

- Brooklyn Democrats
- Filipino American Democratic Club
- Empire State Humane Voters
- Downtown Independent Democrats
- Jim Owles Liberal Democratic Club
- League of Independent Theaters
- Manhattan Democrats
- New York League of Conservation Voters
- New York State Nurses Association
- Planned Parenthood NYC
- Stonewall Democrats
- West Harlem Democratic Club

Political parties

- Working Families Party
Michel Faulkner (R)

State legislators

- Nicole Malliotakis, state assemblywoman from the 60th district (2011–2012) and 64th district (2013–2021) (Note: Malliotakis has since been elected to U.S. Congress representing New York's 11th district, but was still in the State Assembly in 2017.)

Organizations

- Brooklyn GOP
- Queens GOP

Political parties

- Reform Party

=== Results ===
While Stringer won a second term in a landslide, Republican challenger Faulkner flipped Staten Island (Richmond County), winning just over 51% of the vote.

General election results
Party	Candidate	Votes	%
Democratic	Scott Stringer	778,258	71.17%
Working Families	Scott Stringer	60,686	5.55%
Total	Scott Stringer	838,943	76.72%
Republican	Michel Faulkner	171,431	15.68%
Conservative	Michel Faulkner	34,446	3.15%
Reform	Michel Faulkner	3,773	0.35%
Stop De Blasio	Michel Faulkner	3,542	0.32%
Total	Michel Faulkner	213,192	19.5%
Green	Julia Willebrand	34,371	3.14%
Libertarian	Alex Merced	6,100	0.6%
Write-in		958	0.09%
Total votes		1,093,564	100%
Democratic hold			
