= 2017 New York City borough president elections =

- November 7, 2017
- Turnout: 23.08%
	Majority party	Minority party
Party	Democratic	Republican
Seats before	4	1
Seats won	4	1
Seat change	Steady	Steady
Popular vote	849,511	220,676
Percentage	77.23% (Note: Totals may be combined with that of other parties who cross-endorsed Democratic Party candidates via electoral fusion.)	20.06%
Swing	▼4.11%	▲5.30%
- Results: Democratic hold Republican hold

The 2017 New York City borough president elections were held on November 7, 2017, to elect the presidents of each of the five boroughs in New York City. They coincided with other city elections, including for mayor, public advocate, and city council.

All five incumbents were re-elected, and Democrats won all boroughs except for Staten Island.

== Summary ==
Summary of results by Borough (Note: Percentages don't add up to 100 as this table excludes minor parties, independents, and write-in votes.)
Borough	Democratic candidate, vote, %	Republican candidate, vote, %
Manhattan	Gale Brewer, (Note: Also ran for the Working Families Party, whose votes this tally includes.) 210,731, 83.15%	Frank Scala, 30,410, 12.00%
The Bronx	Ruben Diaz Jr., 125,808, 88.08%	Steven DeMartis, 9,404, 6.58%
Brooklyn	Eric Adams, 278,488, 82.95%	Vito J. Bruno, (Note: Also ran as a Conservative, whose votes this tally includes.) 50,686, 15.10%
Queens	Melinda Katz, 211,016, 77.84%	William K. Kregler, 57,705, 21.29%
Staten Island	Thomas E. Shcherbenko, 23,467, 24.22%	James Oddo, (Note: Also ran under Conservative, Independence, and Reform, all of whose votes this tally includes.) 72,471, 74.80%

== Manhattan ==
2017 Manhattan presidential election

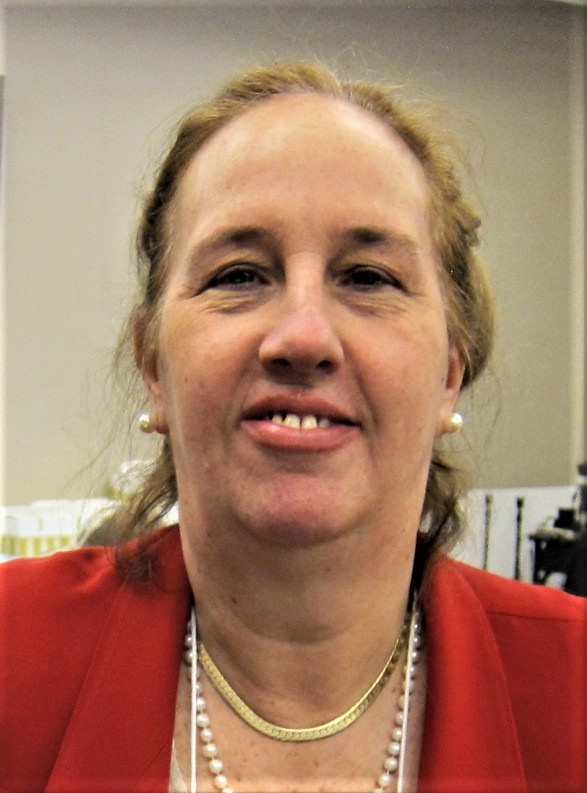

Nominee	Gale Brewer	Frank Scala
Party	Democratic	Republican
Alliance	Working Families
Popular vote	210,731	30,410
Percentage	83.15%	12.00%
- State Assembly results Brewer: 60–70% 70–80% 80–90% >90%
President before election
Gale Brewer
Democratic
Elected President
Gale Brewer
Democratic

Incumbent Democrat Gale Brewer ran for re-election to a second term.

2017 Manhattan borough president election
Party	Candidate	Votes	%
Democratic	Gale Brewer	194,237	76.64
Working Families	Gale Brewer	16,495	6.51
Total	Gale Brewer (incumbent)	210,732	83.15
Republican	Frank Scala	30,410	12.00
Green	Daniel Vila Rivera	7,373	2.91
Libertarian	Brian Waddell	3,430	1.35
Reform	Brian Waddell	1,209	0.48
Total	Brian Waddell	4,639	1.83
Write-in		276	0.11
Total valid votes		253,430	93.14
Rejected ballots		18,650	6.85
Total votes		272,080	100.00
Democratic hold			

== The Bronx ==
2017 Bronx presidential election

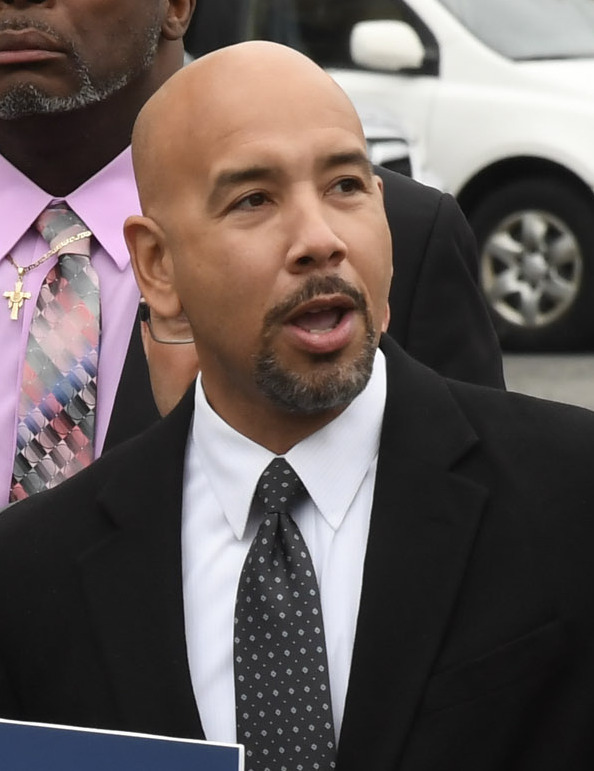

Nominee	Rubén Díaz Jr.	Steven DeMartis
Party	Democratic	Republican
Alliance	Working Families
Popular vote	125,808	9,404
Percentage	88.08%	6.58%
- State Assembly results Díaz: 70–80% 80–90% >90%
President before election
Rubén Díaz Jr.
Democratic
Elected President
Rubén Díaz Jr.
Democratic

Incumbent Democrat Rubén Díaz Jr. ran for re-election to a third term. He was the only incumbent president to face primary challengers, with the primary being held on September 12.

=== Democratic primary ===
Democratic primary
Party	Candidate	Votes	%
Democratic	Rubén Díaz Jr. (incumbent)	57,244	85.95
Democratic	Camella D. Price	7,736	11.61
Democratic	Avery Selkridge	1,498	2.25
Write-in		126	0.19
Total valid votes		66,604	93.70
Rejected ballots		4,480	6.30
Total votes		71,084	100.00

=== General election ===
2017 Bronx borough president election
Party	Candidate	Votes	%
Democratic	Rubén Díaz Jr.	120,528	84.38
Working Families	Rubén Díaz Jr.	5,280	3.70
Total	Rubén Díaz Jr. (incumbent)	125,808	88.08
Republican	Steven DeMartis	9,404	6.58
Conservative	Antonio Vitiello	3,693	2.59
Reform	Camella D. Price	3,651	2.56
Write-in		279	0.36
Total valid votes		142,835	95.40
Rejected ballots		6,882	4.60
Total votes		149,717	100.00
Democratic hold			

== Brooklyn ==
2017 Brooklyn presidential election

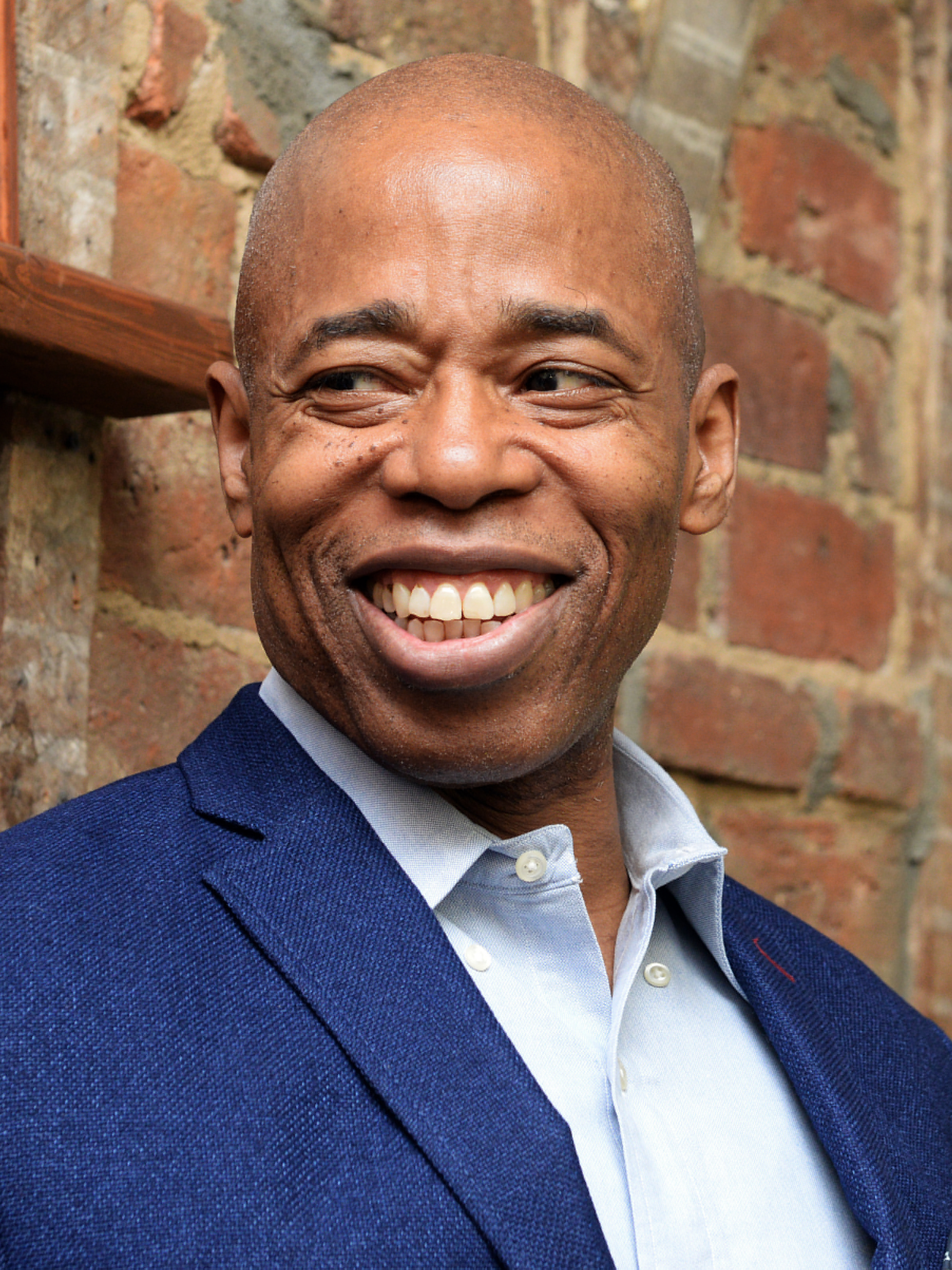

Nominee	Eric Adams	Vito Bruno
Party	Democratic	Republican
Alliance	Working Families	Conservative
Popular vote	278,488	50,686
Percentage	82.95%	15.10%
- State Assembly results Adams: 40–50% 50–60% 60–70% 70–80% 80–90% >90%
President before election
Eric Adams
Democratic
Elected President
Eric Adams
Democratic

Incumbent Democrat Eric Adams ran for re-election to a second term.

=== Reform primary ===
Reform primary
Party	Candidate	Votes	%
Reform	Benjamin G. Kissel	1,399	79.35
Write-in		364	20.64
Total valid votes		1,763	67.37
Rejected ballots		854	32.63
Total votes		2,617	100.00

=== General election ===
2017 Brooklyn borough president election
Party	Candidate	Votes	%
Democratic	Eric Adams	251,247	74.84
Working Families	Eric Adams	27,241	8.11
Total	Eric Adams (incumbent)	278,488	82.95
Republican	Vito Bruno	41,955	12.50
Conservative	Vito Bruno	8,731	2.60
Total	Vito Bruno	50,686	15.10
Reform	Benjamin G. Kissel	6,017	1.79
Write-in		521	0.12
Total valid votes		335,712	93.75
Rejected ballots		22,373	6.25
Total votes		358,085	100.00
Democratic hold			

== Queens ==
2017 Queens presidential election

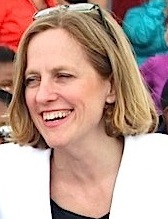

Nominee	Melinda Katz	William Kregler
Party	Democratic	Republican
Alliance	Working Families	Conservative
Popular vote	211,016	57,705
Percentage	77.84%	21.29%
President before election
Melinda Katz
Democratic
Elected President
Melinda Katz
Democratic

Incumbent Democrat Melinda Katz ran for re-election to a second term.

2017 Queens borough president election
Party	Candidate	Votes	%
Democratic	Melinda Katz	196,870	72.62
Working Families	Melinda Katz	14,146	5.22
Total	Melinda Katz (incumbent)	211,016	77.84
Republican	William K. Kregler	47,678	17.59
Conservative	William K. Kregler	10,027	3.70
Total	William K. Kregler	57,705	21.29
Homeowners NYCHA	Everly D. Brown	2,039	0.75
Write-in		318	0.12
Total valid votes		271,078	94.74
Rejected ballots		15,052	5.26
Total votes		286,130	100.00
Democratic hold			

== Staten Island ==
2017 Staten Island presidential election
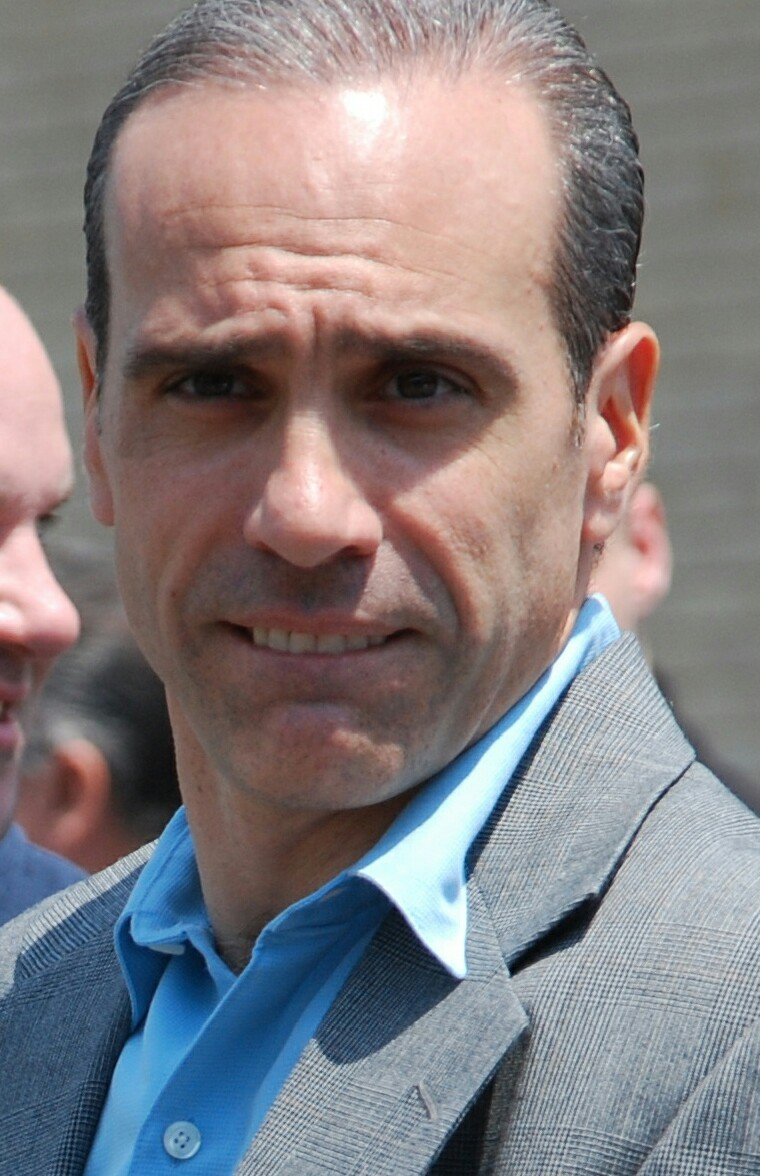

Nominee	James Oddo	Thomas Shcherbenko
Party	Republican	Democratic
Alliance	Conservative; Independence; Reform	Working Families
Popular vote	72,471	23,467
Percentage	74.80%	24.22%
- State Assembly results Oddo: 50–60% 70–80% 80–90%
President before election
James Oddo
Republican
Elected President
James Oddo
Republican

Incumbent Republican James Oddo ran for re-election to a second term.

2017 Staten Island borough president election
Party	Candidate	Votes	%
Republican	James Oddo	60,765	62.72
Conservative	James Oddo	9,124	9.42
Independence	James Oddo	1,979	2.04
Reform	James Oddo	603	0.62
Total	James Oddo (incumbent)	72,471	74.80
Democratic	Thomas E. Shcherbenko	21,980	22.69
Working Families	Thomas E. Shcherbenko	1,487	1.53
Total	Thomas E. Shcherbenko	23,467	24.22
Green	Henry J. Bardel	820	0.85
Write-in		131	0.14
Total valid votes		96,889	96.60
Rejected ballots		3,413	3.40
Total votes		100,302	100.00
Republican hold			
