= 2017 New York City mayoral election =

- November 7, 2017
- Registered: 4,568,579
- Turnout: 1,166,313; 25.52% (▼0.44 pp)
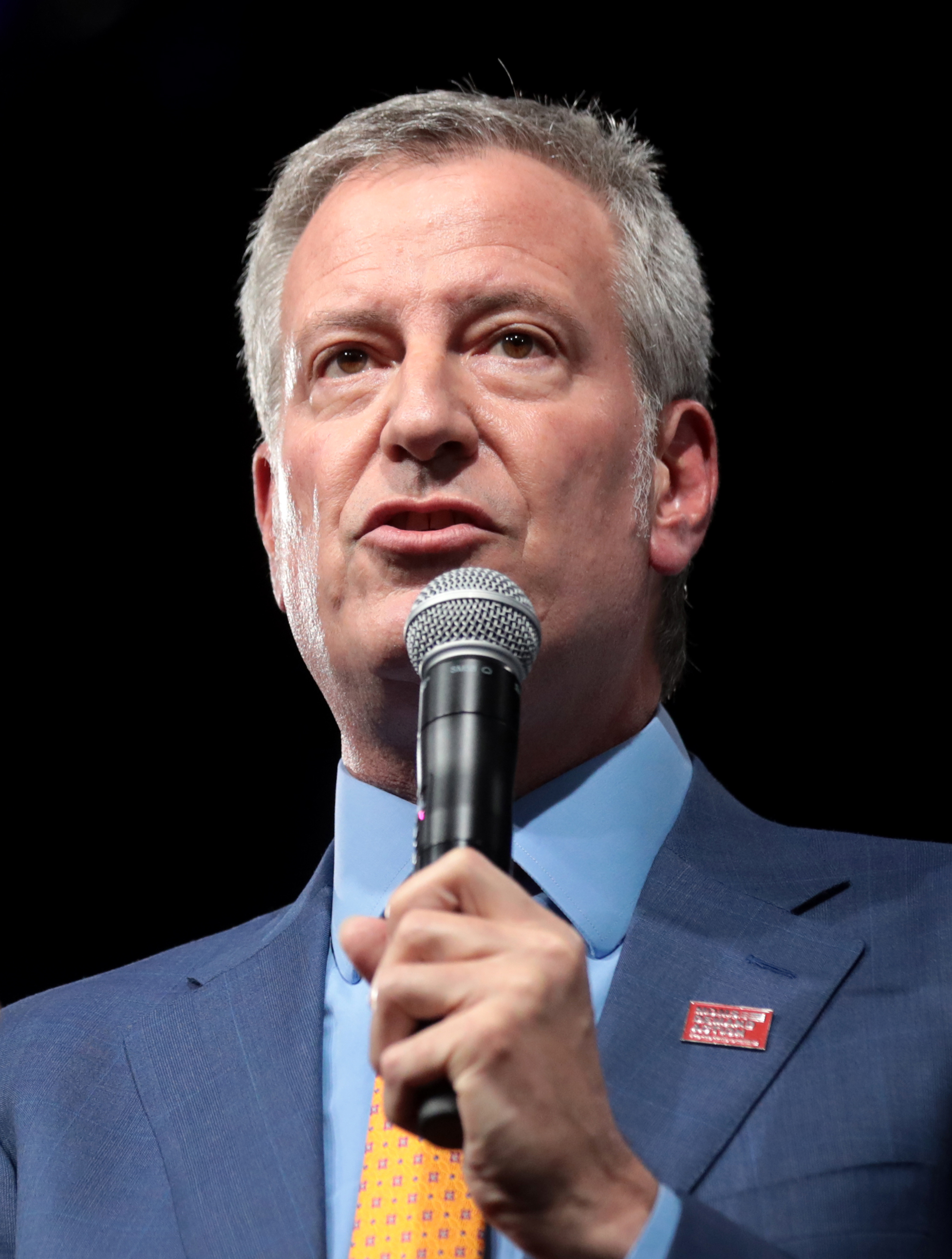

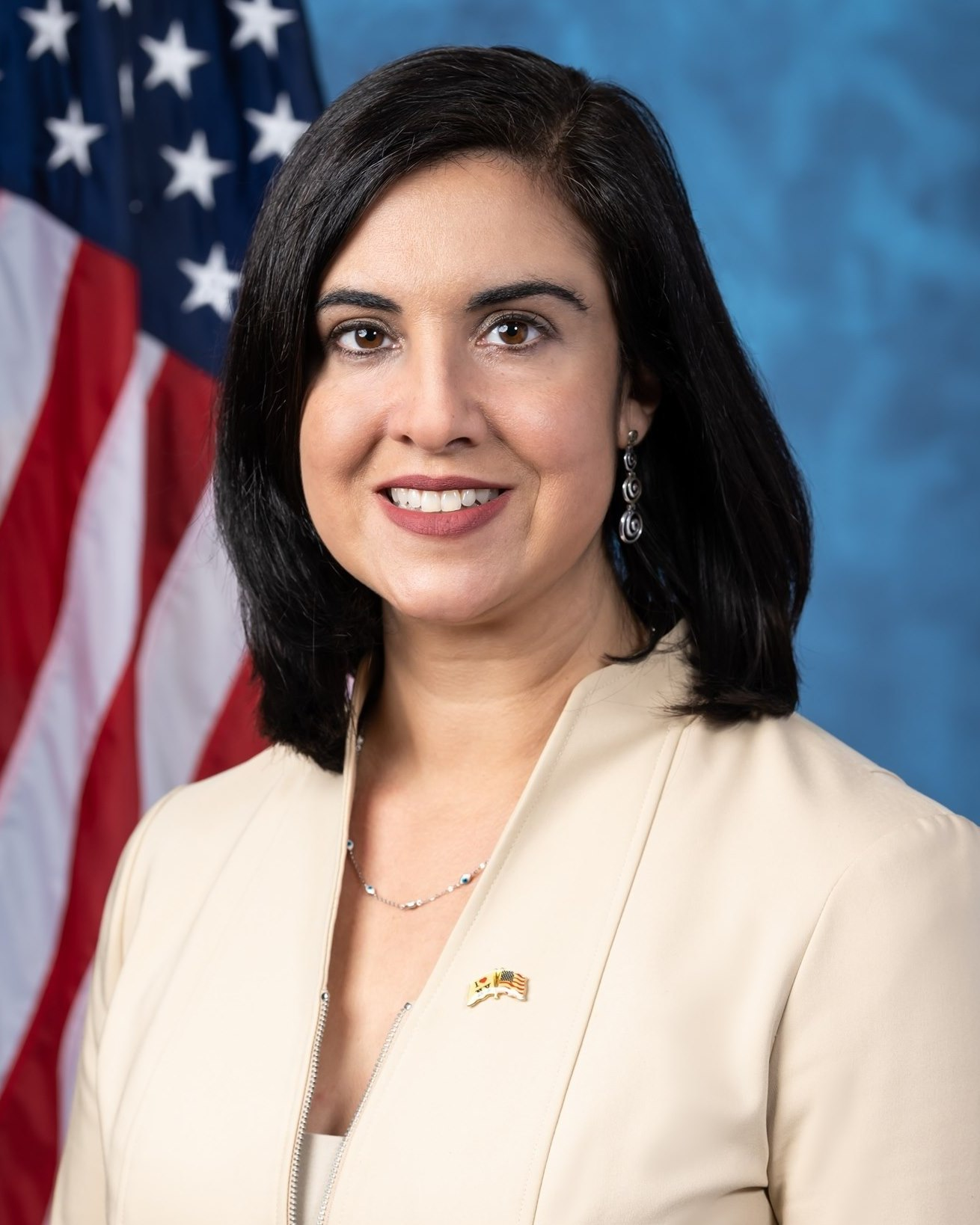
Nominee	Bill de Blasio	Nicole Malliotakis
Party	Democratic	Republican
Alliance	Working Families	Conservative
Popular vote	760,112	316,947
Percentage	66.17%	27.69%
- de Blasio: 30–40% 40–50% 50–60% 60–70% 70–80% 80–90% >90% Malliotakis: 40–50% 50–60% 60–70% 70–80% 80–90% >90% Tie: 30–40% 40–50% 50% No votes
Mayor before election
Bill de Blasio
Democratic
Elected Mayor
Bill de Blasio
Democratic

An election for Mayor of New York City was held on November 7, 2017. Incumbent Democratic Mayor Bill de Blasio won re-election to a second term with 66.2% of the vote against Republican Nicole Malliotakis.

== Background ==
Bill de Blasio was elected mayor of New York City in 2013, with his term beginning January 1, 2014. De Blasio declared his intention to seek reelection in April 2015.

The following candidates filed petitions to have their names on the ballot during the primary elections: Democrats Bill De Blasio, Sal Albanese, Robert Gangi, Richard Bashner and Michael Tolkin, and Republicans Nicole Malliotakis, Rocky De La Fuente and Walter Iwachiw.

On May 9, 2017, the Libertarian Party nominated Aaron Commey. It was Commey's first run for political office. On August 1, 2017, the City Board of Elections determined in a hearing that Rocky De La Fuente had not received enough petition signatures to qualify for the Republican primary ballot. With De La Fuente's disqualification and the remaining Republican candidate, Walter Iwachiw, not reporting any fundraising for this election, Nicole Malliotakis was the only remaining candidate for the Republican nomination.

There were two Democratic primary debates, on August 23 and September 6. The candidates were incumbent mayor Bill De Blasio and former City Council member Sal Albanese. De Blasio won the primary.

The first general election debate was held on October 10, with De Blasio, Republican challenger Nicole Malliotakis, and independent candidate Bo Dietl. The second was held on November 1.

== Democratic primary ==
=== Candidates ===
==== Nominee ====
- Bill de Blasio, incumbent mayor of New York City

==== Eliminated in primary ====
- Sal Albanese, former city councilman and candidate for mayor in 1997 and 2013
- Richard Bashner, real estate attorney
- Robert Gangi, activist
- Michael Tolkin, entrepreneur

==== Withdrew ====
- Tony Avella, state senator, former city councilman and candidate for mayor in 2009
- Michael Basch, chief business officer of The Future Project
- Kevin P. Coenen Jr., firefighter and candidate for mayor in 2009 and 2013
- Bo Dietl, former Fox News contributor and former New York City Police Department detective (ran on the Independent line)
- Scott Joyner, community advocate and service sector worker
- Joel Roderiguez, police officer
- Eric Roman
- Collin Slattery, entrepreneur
- Josh Thompson, education activist

==== Declined ====
- Hillary Clinton, former U.S. Secretary of State, former U.S. Senator, former First Lady and nominee for president in 2016
- Rubén Díaz, Jr., Bronx Borough President (ran for re-election)
- Shaun Donovan, former Director of the Office of Management and Budget and former United States Secretary of Housing and Urban Development
- Harold Ford Jr., former U.S. Representative from Tennessee's 9th congressional district
- Letitia James, New York City Public Advocate (ran for re-election)
- Hakeem Jeffries, U.S. Representative from New York's 8th congressional district
- Melissa Mark-Viverito, Speaker of the New York City Council
- Eva Moskowitz, founder and CEO of Success Academy Charter Schools
- Christine Quinn, former Speaker of the New York City Council and candidate for mayor in 2013
- Scott Stringer, New York City Comptroller (running for re-election)
- Anthony Weiner, former U.S. Representative for New York's 9th congressional district and candidate for mayor in 2005 and 2013
- Keith L. T. Wright, former State Assemblyman

=== Primary results ===
Democratic primary results
Party	Candidate	Votes	%
Democratic	Bill de Blasio (incumbent)	326,361	74.6%
Democratic	Sal Albanese	66,636	15.2%
Democratic	Michael Tolkin	20,445	4.7%
Democratic	Robert Gangi	13,537	3.1%
Democratic	Richard Bashner	10,538	2.4%
Total votes		437,517	100.0%

== Republican primary ==
=== Candidates ===
==== Nominated ====
- Nicole Malliotakis, state assemblywoman

==== Withdrew ====
- Bo Dietl, former Fox News contributor and former New York City Police Department detective (ran on the Independent line)
- Michel Faulkner, pastor and former New York Jets player (ran for comptroller)
- Rocky De La Fuente, businessman, Reform Party and American Delta Party nominee for president in 2016, Democratic candidate for president in 2016 and Democratic candidate for the U.S. Senate from Florida in 2016 (disqualified from the Republican ballot by not having enough signatures)
- Anniello (Neil) V. Grimaldi, Attorney (did not file for the primary ballot)
- Walter Iwachiw, businessman
- Paul Massey, businessman

==== Declined ====
- John Catsimatidis, businessman and candidate for mayor in 2013
- Raymond Kelly, former New York City Police Commissioner
- Donald Trump Jr., businessman and son of President of the United States Donald Trump
- Eric Ulrich, city councilman (running for re-election)

=== Endorsements ===
Paul Massey (withdrawn)

Individuals

- Jeb Bush, 43rd governor of Florida (1999–2007), 2016 presidential candidate
- Michel Faulkner, former New York Jets football player and pastor

Organizations

- Bronx Republican Party
- Independence Party of New York
- Queens Republican Party

== Major third parties ==
Besides the Democratic and Republican parties, the Conservative, Green, Working Families, Independence, Reform, and Women's Equality parties are qualified New York parties, with automatic ballot access.

Paul Massey ran as an independent but suddenly withdrew.

Albanese was nominated by the Reform Party Committee. On September 12, 2017, an Opportunity to Ballot was held to determine whether Albanese would retain the party's nomination. Dietl and Malliotakis each attempted to the secure the party line. Albanese won the race with approximately 57% of the vote, defeating the write-in campaigns.

=== Reform ===
==== Nominee ====
- Sal Albanese, former city councilman and candidate for mayor in 1997 and 2013

=== Working Families ===
==== Nominee ====
- Bill de Blasio, incumbent mayor

== Minor third party and independent candidates ==
=== Libertarian ===
==== Nominee ====
- Aaron Commey, director of events for the Manhattan Libertarian Party

=== Independents ===
==== Candidates ====
- Bo Dietl, former Fox News contributor and former New York City Police Department detective (running on the "Dump the Mayor" line)
- Dr. Robbie Gosine
- Mike Tolkin, entrepreneur (running on the "Smart Cities" line)

==== Withdrew ====
- Eric Armstead, security manager
- Scott Berry, musician, author (did not qualify for ballot)
- Garrett M. Bowser, self-employed (did not qualify for ballot)
- Abbey Laurel-Smith, founder of the Pilgrims Alliance Party of America (did not qualify for ballot)
- Ese O'Diah, CEO of Liquorbox
- Karmen M. Smith, volunteer team leader with New York Cares (did not qualify for ballot)
- Ahsan A. Syed (ran on the Theocratic Party line)

== General election ==
=== Endorsements ===
Bill De Blasio (D)

Politicians

- Eric Adams, Borough President of Brooklyn
- Yvette Clarke, Member of the U.S. House of Representatives from New York's 9th District
- Rubén Díaz Jr., Borough President of the Bronx
- Carl Heastie, Speaker of the New York State Assembly
- Tish James, New York City Public Advocate
- Carolyn Maloney, Member of the U.S. House of Representatives from New York's 12th District
- Gregory Meeks, Member of the U.S. House of Representatives from New York's 5th District
- Bernie Sanders, U.S. Senator from Vermont and 2016 presidential candidate
- Chuck Schumer, U.S. Senator from New York and US Senate Minority leader
- Scott Stringer, New York City Comptroller (running for re-election)
- Nydia Velázquez, Member of the U.S. House of Representatives from New York's 7th District

Individuals

- David Dinkins, former mayor of New York City (1990–1993)
- Christine Quinn, former Speaker of the New York City Council (2006–2013)

Newspapers

- The New York Times

Organizations

- New York League of Conservation Voters
- Retail, Wholesale and Department Store Union
- SEIU 32BJ
Nicole Malliotakis (R)

Politicians

- Joe Borelli, council member for the 51st District of the New York City Council
- Ronald Castorina, New York State Assemblyman (initially endorsed Massey, in February 2017; in May 2017 rescinded endorsement and endorsed Malliotakis)
- Dan Donovan, U.S. Congressman from New York's 11th district
- Steven Matteo, Minority Leader of the New York City Council
- James Oddo, Borough President of Staten Island
- George Pataki, former governor of New York

Individuals

- John Catsimatidis, businessman and candidate for mayor in 2013
- Joe Lhota, Metropolitan Transportation Authority Chairperson and nominee for mayor in 2013
- Frank Padavan, former New York State Senator from the 11th district

Organizations

- Brooklyn Republican Party
- Sergeants Benevolent Association
- Staten Island Republican Party

Newspapers

- The Jewish Press
- Jewish Voice
- The National Herald
- New York Post
- Staten Island Advance
Sal Albanese (Reform)

Newspapers

- The Villager
Bo Dietl (I)

Politicians

- Eric Ulrich, New York City Councilman

=== Polling ===
Poll source	Date(s) administered	Sample size	Margin of error	Bill de Blasio (D)	Nicole Malliotakis (R)	Sal Albanese (RF)	Bo Dietl (I)	Other	Undecided
NY1/Baruch College	October 20–27, 2017	800 LV	± 4.5%	49%	16%	2%	3%	—	20%
WNBC/Marist	October 3–4, 2017	428 LV	± 4.7%	58%	16%	5%	5%	2%	15%
WNBC/Marist	October 3–4, 2017	857 RV	± 3.3%	55%	15%	5%	5%	3%	17%
Quinnipiac University	September 27 – October 4, 2017	731 LV	± 4.7%	61%	17%	8%	6%	1%	8%
WNBC/Marist	September 13–17, 2017	451 LV	± 4.6%	65%	18%	—	8%	2%	7%
WNBC/Marist	September 13–17, 2017	898 RV	± 3.3%	62%	18%	—	9%	2%	9%
Quinnipiac University	July 20–26, 2017	877	± 4.1%	52%	15%	—	11%	2%	16%
Quinnipiac University	July 20–26, 2017	877	± 4.1%	57%	22%	—	—	4%	13%
Quinnipiac University	May 10–16, 2017	1,019	± 3.1%	64%	21%	—	—	1%	10%

Hypothetical polling

Poll source	Date(s) administered	Sample size	Margin of error	Bill de Blasio (D)	Paul Massey (R)	Other	Undecided
Quinnipiac University	May 10–16, 2017	1,019	± 3.1%	63%	21%	1%	12%
Quinnipiac University	February 23–27, 2017	1,001	± 3.1%	59%	25%	2%	12%

=== Results ===
A total of 5,343 write-in votes were also certified by the Board of Elections. These included 982 votes for former mayors Michael Bloomberg, 12 for Rudy Giuliani, 9 for Fiorello La Guardia (deceased), 10 for Robbie Gosine, 3 for David Dinkins, and one each for John Lindsay, Abraham Beame, and Ed Koch (the latter three deceased), and 857 that could not be attributed to anybody or counted. The only other people to receive more than 100 write-in votes were former Sen. Hillary Clinton (240) and Christine Quinn, the former Speaker of the New York City Council (195).

New York City mayoral general election, 2017
Party	Candidate	Votes	%
Democratic	Bill de Blasio	713,634	62.28
Working Families	Bill de Blasio	46,478	4.06
Total	Bill de Blasio (incumbent)	760,112	66.17
Republican	Nicole Malliotakis	274,423	23.95
Conservative	Nicole Malliotakis	37,197	3.25
Stop de Blasio	Nicole Malliotakis	5,327	0.46
Total	Nicole Malliotakis	316,947	27.59
Reform	Sal Albanese	24,484	2.13
Green	Akeem Browder	16,536	1.44
Small Cities Party	Michael Tolkin	11,309	0.99
Dump the Mayor	Bo Dietl	11,163	0.97
Libertarian	Aaron Commey	2,770	0.24
Write-in		5,343	0.47
Total valid votes		1,148,664	98.49
Rejected ballots		17,649	1.51
Total votes		1,166,314	100
Democratic hold			

==== By borough ====
Manhattan was the only borough where de Blasio improved upon his 2013 margins.

General Election
		Manhattan	The Bronx	Brooklyn	Queens	Staten Island	Total
Democratic - Working Families	Bill de Blasio	190,312	117,712	254,755	171,867	25,466	760,112
Republican - Conservative- Stop de Blasio	Nicole Malliotakis	53,853	23,715	74,343	94,911	70,125	316,947
	All others						89,255
							1,166,314
