= 2017 Easter Island marine reserve referendum =

A three-part referendum on a marine reserve was held in Easter Island on 3 September 2017. Voters were asked whether they approved of the creation of a marine reserve, whether it should be jointly administered by a board of six Easter Islanders and five officials representing the national government, and whether fishing in the marine reserve should be limited to traditional methods. The proposals were the result of a November 2013 decree by the Chilean government that started the process of creating a 740,000 square kilometre marine reserve around Easter Island. All three proposals were approved by voters.

== Results ==
Question	For		Against		Invalid/ blank	Total votes	Registered voters	Turnout
Question	Votes	%	Votes	%	Invalid/ blank	Total votes	Registered voters	Turnout
Formation of a marine reserve	396	64.08	222	35.92	24	642		
Joint administration of the reserve	377	61.80	233	38.20	32	642		
Restriction to traditional fishing methods	477	77.94	135	22.06	30	642		
Source: Direct Democracy
