= 2017 Atlanta City Council election =

Local election in Georgia

- November 7, 2017; December 5, 2017 (runoff)

The 2017 Atlanta City Council election was held on November 7, 2017 for all 16 seats on the Atlanta City Council, with a runoff for several seats on December 5, 2017. It was held concurrently with the 2017 Atlanta mayoral election.

== Council President ==
- C. T. Martin
- Felicia Moore, won
- Alex Wan

== At-Large Post 1 ==
- Michael Julian Bond, won
- Courtney D. English

== At-Large Post 2 ==
- Matt Westmoreland, won
- Cory Ruth
- Bret R. Williams

== At-Large Post 3 ==
- Andre Dickens, won

== District 1 ==
- Ron Aribo
- Oz Hill
- Mo Ivory
- Bill Powell
- Carla Smith (i), won

== District 2 ==
- Amir Farokhi, won
- Stephon Ferguson
- Zelda Jackson
- Nick Mulkey
- Lauren Welsh

== District 3 ==
- Greg Clay
- Ivory Lee Young Jr. (i), won

== District 4 ==
- Mr. Adassa
- Christopher Brown
- Dan Burroughs
- Jason Dozier
- Kimberly Parmer
- Shawn Walton
- Deborah Williams
- Cleta Winslow (i), won

== District 5 ==
- Natalyn Mosby Archibong (i), won
- Liliana Bakhtiari

== District 6 ==
- Jennifer N. Ide, won
- Kirk Rich

== District 7 ==
- Rebecca L. King
- Howard Shook (i), won

== District 8 ==
- J. P. Matzigkeit, won
- Anna Tillman

== District 9 ==
- Kwame Abernathy
- William Harrison
- Dustin Hillis, won

== District 10 ==
- Andrea Boone, won
- Kenny Hill
- Beverly Rice

== District 11 ==
- Harold Hardnett
- Debra F. Harris
- Latarsha D. Holden
- Anthony Johnson
- Edith Ladipo
- Brionte McCorkle
- Marci Collier Overstreet, won
- Georgianne Thomas

== District 12 ==
- Randy Gibbs
- Michael Jackson
- Joyce Sheperd, won
- Diana Watley
