= Lofa-1 =

Electoral district in Liberia

- Constituency for the House of Representatives of Liberia
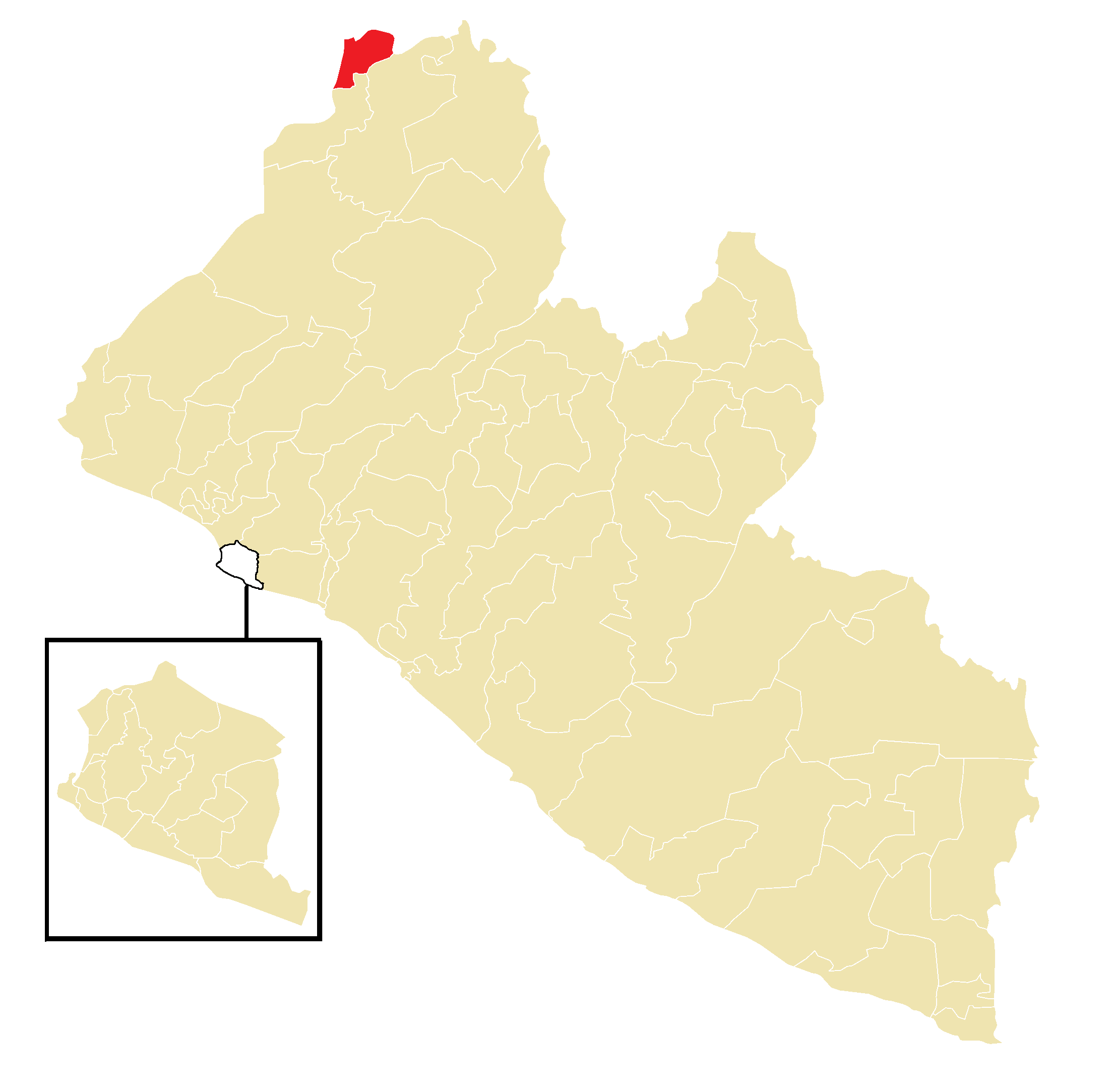
- Electorate: 39,844 (2023)

Current constituency
- Created: 2011
- Representative: Thomas P. Fallah

Lofa-1 is an electoral district for the elections to the House of Representatives of Liberia. The constituency covers the northern parts of Foya District, i.e. the communities of Borliloe, Lepaloe, Ndehuma, Yelayaloe, Konkpama, Bandenin, Bandenin Melimu, Ndama, Foya, Fassapoe and Sinagole.

== Elected representatives ==
Year	Representative elected	Party	Notes
2005	Eugene F. Kparkar	LP	
2011	Eugene F. Kparkar	LP	Died in office.
2017	Francis Sakila Nyumalin, Sr.	ULD	
2017	Francis Sakila Nyumalin, Sr.	UP	
2023	Thomas P. Fallah	CDC	

== Election results ==
2005 Lofa County's 1st House District Election
Candidate	Party	Votes	%
Eugene F. Kparkar	Liberty Party	4,347	33.01
Francis Sakila Nyumalin Sr.	Independent	2,125	16.14
Katherine Mamie Kpoto-Wayas	Union of Liberian Democrats	1,983	15.06
John Borley Dovee Sr.	Unity Party	1,471	11.17
George Tamba Tengbeh	National Patriotic Party	1,042	7.91
Gabriel Fayia McCarthy	Coalition for the Transformation of Liberia	907	6.89
Samuel Forkpa Moliwulo Sr.	National Democratic Party of Liberia	847	6.43
Nicholas Fallah Mangorlor Faryombo	Free Democratic Party	448	3.40
Total		13,170	100.00
Valid votes		13,170	93.65
Invalid/blank votes		893	6.35
Total votes		14,063	100.00

2011 Lofa County's 1st House District Election
Candidate	Party	Votes	%
Eugene F. Kparkar (Incumbent)	Liberty Party	12,135	69.83
Francis Sakila Nyumalin Sr.	Unity Party	3,253	18.72
Moses Armah Saah	Liberia Destiny Party	1,267	7.29
Fayah J. S. Gbollie Sr.	National Union for Democratic Progress	724	4.17
Total		17,379	100.00
Valid votes		17,379	93.06
Invalid/blank votes		1,297	6.94
Total votes		18,676	100.00

2017 Lofa County's 1st House District Election
Candidate	Party	Votes	%
Francis Sakila Nyumalin Sr. (Incumbent)	Unity Party	9,831	50.51
William Tamba Kamba Sr.	Movement for Economic Empowerment	9,095	46.73
Elizabeth Tamba	Liberty Party	538	2.76
Total		19,464	100.00
Valid votes		19,464	96.07
Invalid/blank votes		797	3.93
Total votes		20,261	100.00
