= 2017 Liberian by-election =

The 2017 Liberian by-election was held on February 28 in Lofa-1. The by-election was caused by the death of Representative Eugene F. Kparkar. The election was considered a major loss for Kparkar's party, the Liberty Party. The seat was won by Francis Nyumalin on the Union of Liberian Democrats ticket.

== Background ==
Eugene F. Kparkar died on November 10, 2016. He represented Lofa County's 1st House district and was a member of the Liberty Party (LP). The House of Representatives notified the National Elections Commission (NEC) of the resultant vacancy on December 7.

The by-election was scheduled for February 28, 2017. On January 23, 2017, the NEC released the official list of the nine candidates qualified for the election. The list was as follows: Jeremiah Saah Borlay of the Movement for Democracy and Reconstruction (MDR), James T. O. Peter of the Alternative National Congress (ANC), William Tamba Kamba Sr. of the Movement for Economic Empowerment (MOVEE), William Saah Kettor of the ruling Unity Party, Joseph Tamba Machulay Sr. of the Liberia Transformation Party (LTP), Francis Sakila Nyumahn Sr. of the Union of Liberian Democrats (ULD), William Saa Tamba of the LP, Tamba Damacious Saysay of the All Liberian Party (ALP), and independent candidate Elizabeth Tamba. The campaign officially began on January 23 and lasted until February 26.

Ballots for the election arrived in Liberia on February 16.

== Aftermath ==
The by-election was held on February 28. The NEC reported the election was peaceful. The NEC declared the final results of the election on March 2. Francis Nyumahn of the ULD won 3,149 votes, 32.03% of the total valid votes. In second place was MOVEE candidate William Kamba with 2,996 votes, 30.5% of the total valid votes. There were 9,832 valid votes cast in the election, along with 771 invalid votes. Kamba complained to the NEC, alleging the number of invalid votes was strange. The NEC dismissed Kamba's complaints due to lack of evidence. Nyumahn was certificated by the NEC on March 22.

The by-election was a major loss for the LP, despite having won the seat in two previous elections. Their candidate won only 410 votes, 4.2% of the valid votes, coming in at seventh place. FrontPage Africa reported that some members of the LP criticized Senator Steve Zargo, blaming him for the party's loss. Zargo was a key member of the party and a native of the district. Zargo blamed the loss on the inherently spontaneous nature of by-elections as well "culture and traditional factors".
