= Palacio Vasallo =

Coordinates: 32°56′54″S 60°37′49″W

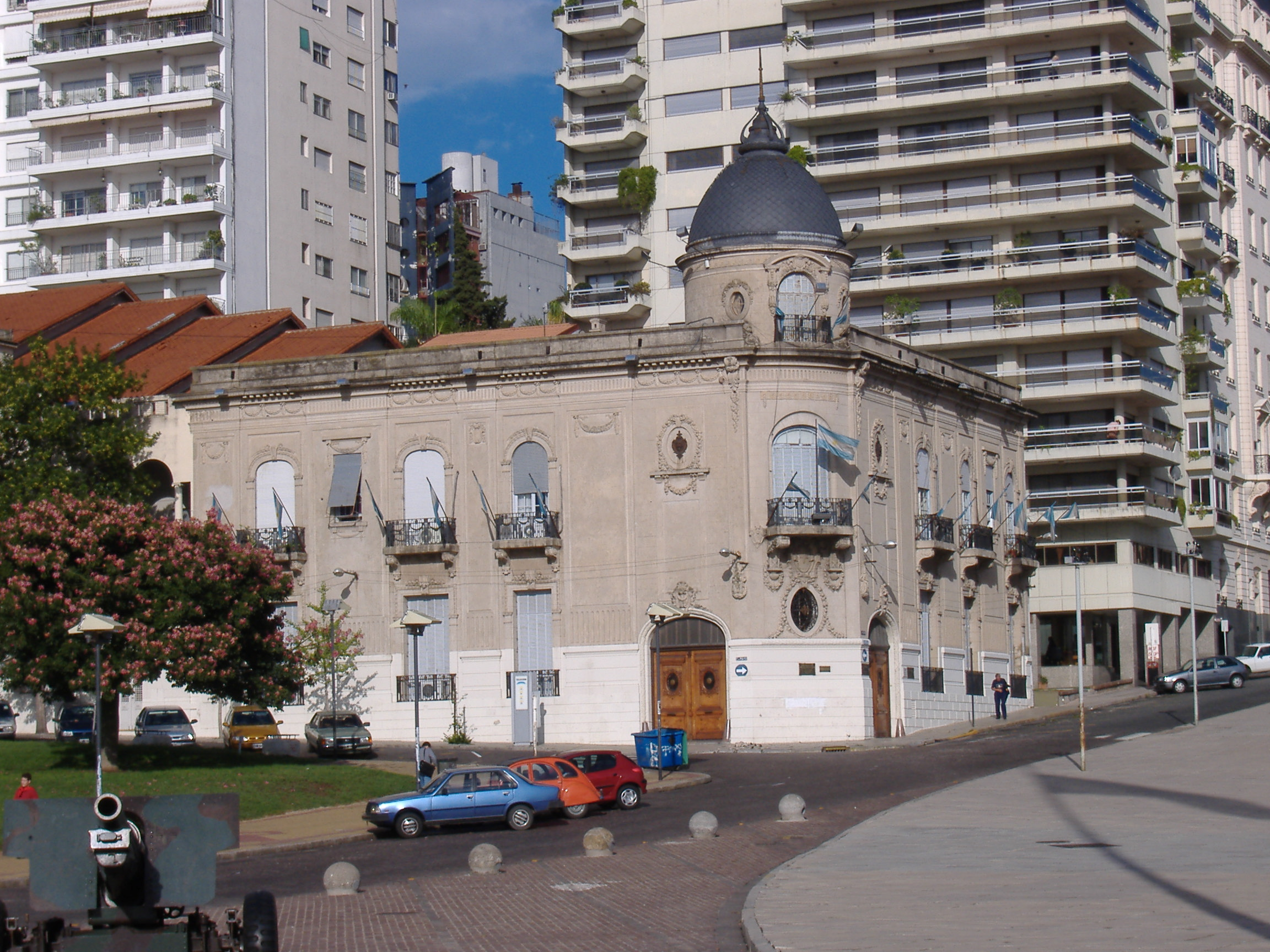

General information
- Location: Rosario, Santa Fe, Argentina
- Completed: 1911; 115 years ago
- Opened: May 25, 1952 (as seat of Rosario municipal government)
- Client: Dr. Bartolomé Vassallo
- Owner: City of Rosario

Design and construction
- Architect: Alejo Infante

Palacio Vasallo (Spanish, "Vasallo Palace") is the seat of the Legislative Branch of the municipal government of Rosario, province of Santa Fe, Argentina. The building, designed by Alejo Infante and completed in 1911, is located near the National Flag Memorial, and has been the site of Rosario's Deliberative Council since May 18, 1951. It was donated to the city by notable surgeon Dr. Bartolomé Vassallo (d. 1945), together with a collection of artistic works kept there.

== History ==
The old Deliberative Council worked in the s. XIX in the Palace of the Lions (Rosario), where the officials were held in a field adjacent to the office of the mayor.

When the "entrerriano" surgeon based in Rosario, Bartolomé Vassallo, in his will he donated to a museum the exquisite palace of Córdoba and May 1, which he had built the engineer Alejo Infante, in 1911. Dr. Vassallo died on 5 February 1943. The headquarters was officially inaugurated in the historic session of May 25, 1952.
