= 2017 United States Virgin Islands special legislative election =

- April 8, 2017
Candidate	Janelle Sarauw	Justin Harrigan Sr.
Party	Independent	Democratic
Popular vote	1,292; 28.65%	1,078; 23.91%
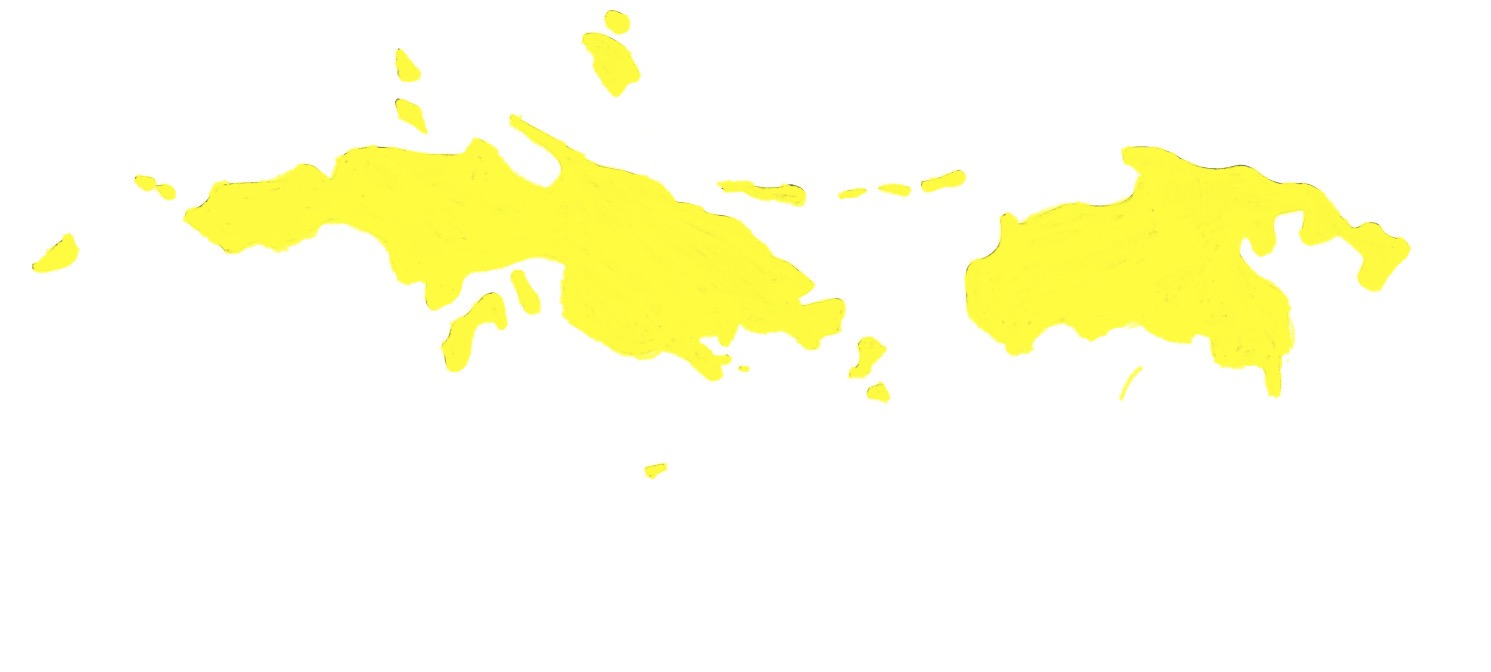
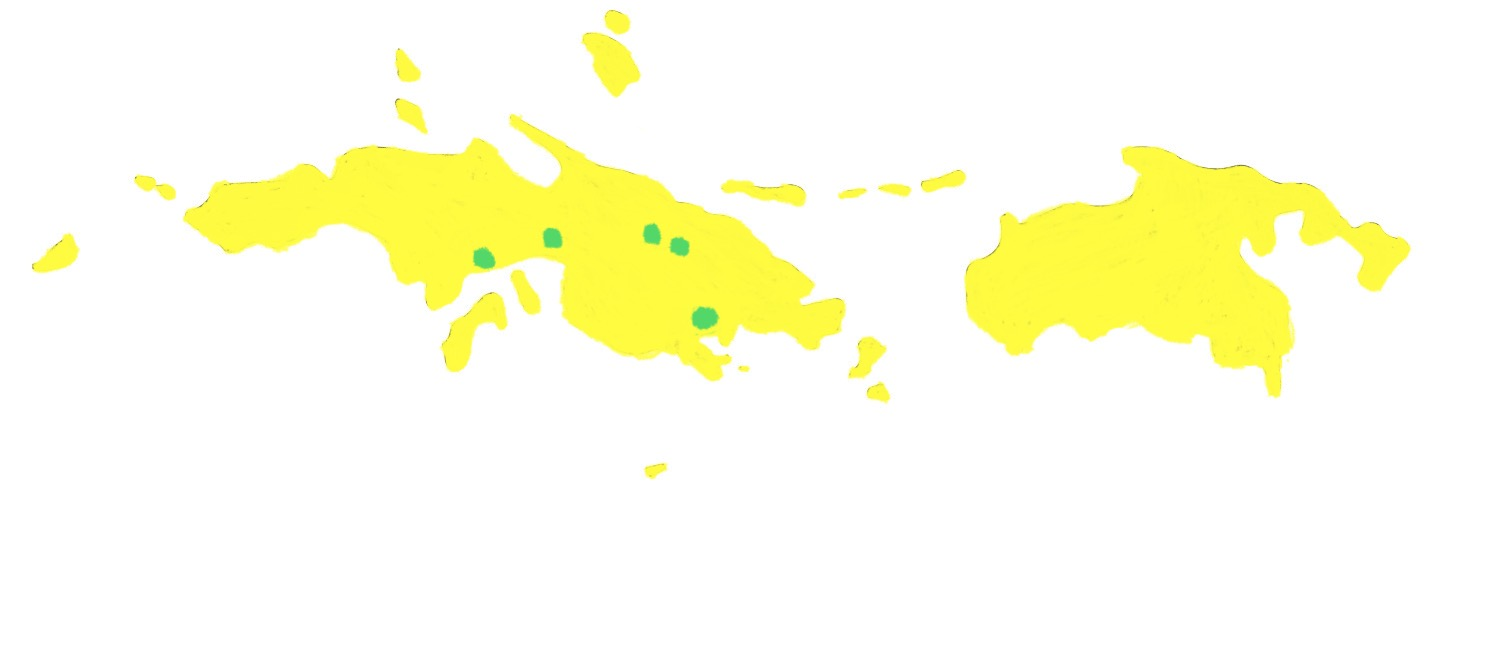
- Results: Sarauw Harrigan
Senator before election
Vacant
Elected Senator
Janelle Sarauw
Independent

The 2017 United States Virgin Islands legislative election was held on Saturday, April 8, 2017, in the St. Thomas-St. John district, to fill an undetermined seat in the 32nd Virgin Islands Legislature.

In February 2017, Governor Kenneth Mapp called for a special election following a decision by the Supreme Court of the Virgin Islands to ban Senator-elect Kevin Rodríquez from serving in the Legislature of the Virgin Islands.

== Results ==
Candidate	Party	Votes	%
Janelle K. Sarauw	Independent	1,292	28.65
Justin Harrigan, Sr.	Democratic Party	1,078	23.91
Alma Francis-Heyliger	Independent	469	10.40
Barbara A. Petersen	Democratic Party	392	8.69
Patrick Simeon Sprauve	Democratic Party	320	7.10
Stephen "Smokey" Frett	Independent Citizens Movement	288	6.39
Lloyd L. Williams	Democratic Party	193	4.28
Gustave R. Dowling	Democratic Party	120	2.66
Randolph L. Thomas	Democratic Party	105	2.33
Darien L. Wheatley	Democratic Party	95	2.11
Wilma Marsh Monsanto	Independent	62	1.38
Robert Max Schanfarber	Republican Party	55	1.22
Gilmore A. Estrill, Sr.	Independent	19	0.42
Write in		21	0.47
Total		4,509	100.00
Valid votes		4,509	99.32
Invalid/blank votes		31	0.68
Total votes		4,540	100.00
Registered voters/turnout		24,433	18.58

=== Results by Precinct ===
Precinct	Sarauw	Harrigan	Francis-Heyliger	Total
0020 Ivanna Eudora Kean HS	66 (36.46%)	38 (20.99%)	20 (11.05%)	124
0021 Joseph A. Gomez Elementary	45 (22.17%)	53 (26.99%)	32 (15.76)	130
0025 Bertha C. Boschulte MS	40 (21.28%)	45 (23.94%)	32 (17.02%)	117
0026 CAHS Gymnasium	140 (26.82%)	131 (25.10%)	42 (8.05%)	313
0028 Oswald Harris Court	29 (31.87%)	14 (15.38%)	11 (12.09%)	54
0029 Winston Raymo Community Center	52 (22.03%)	66 (27.97%)	34 (14.41%)	152
0030 Glady’s Abraham ES	213 (29.71%)	169 (23.57%)	65 (9.07%)	447
0032 Addelita Cancryn JHS	145 (21.55%)	161 (23.92%)	76 (11.29%)	382
0036 Joseph Sibilly ES	233	81	46	360
0038 Julius E. Sprauve ES	82 (50.31%)	28 (17.18%)	10 (6.13%)	120
0039 Charles W. Turnbull Library	164 (24.70%)	187 (28.16%)	76 (11.45%)	427
0040 Guy Benjamin ES	25 (56.82%)	7 (15.91)	0	32
