= 2017 Minneapolis municipal election =

- November 7, 2017

A general election was held in Minneapolis on November 7, 2017. Minneapolis's mayor was up for election as well as all the seats on the City Council, the two elected seats on the Board of Estimate and Taxation, and all the seats on the Park and Recreation Board. Voters were able to rank up to three candidates for each office in order of preference.

== Mayor ==
Incumbent Minnesota Democratic–Farmer–Labor Party (DFL) Mayor Betsy Hodges sought re-election to a second term among a field of 16 candidates. Jacob Frey won after five rounds of vote tabulations via instant-runoff voting.

== City Council ==
All 13 seats on the Minneapolis City Council were up for election. 13 members were elected from single-member districts via instant-runoff voting.

== Board of Estimate and Taxation ==
The two elected seats on the Board of Estimate and Taxation were up for election. Two members were elected from one citywide, at-large district via the single transferable vote.

=== Candidates ===
Incumbents		Candidates	
Name	First elected	Name	Party endorsement
Carol Becker	2005	Carol Becker	Minneapolis DFL
David Wheeler	2009	David Wheeler	Minneapolis DFL

=== Results ===
Candidate	% 1st choice	Round 1
Carol Becker	69.11	48,163
David Wheeler	27.71	19,312
John Edwards (Note: Write-in candidate.)	2.21	1,539
Write-ins	0.98	680
Valid votes		69,694
Threshold		23,232
Undervotes		36,234
Turnout	42.45	105,928
Registered voters		249,512
Source: Minneapolis Elections & Voter Services

== Park and Recreation Board ==
All nine seats on the Park and Recreation Board were up for election. Three members were elected from one citywide, at-large district via the single transferable vote and six from single-member districts via instant-runoff voting.

=== Retiring members ===
- John Erwin, at-large
- Jon Olson, District 2
- Anita Tabb, District 4
- Scott Vreeland, District 3
- Liz Wielinski, District 1
- Annie Young, at-large

=== Candidates ===
District	Incumbent(s)		Candidates	
District	Name	First elected	Name	Party endorsement
At-large	John Erwin (Note: Retired; did not seek re-election.)	2002, 2009 (Note: Elected to non-consecutive terms.)	Charlie Casserly	
At-large	Meg Forney	2013	Mike Derus	
At-large	Annie Young	1989	Meg Forney	
At-large			Londel French	Minneapolis DFL
At-large			Russ Henry	Minneapolis DFL
At-large			Devin Hogan	Minneapolis DFL
At-large			Jonathan Honerbrink	Minneapolis City Republican Committee
At-large			Bob Sullentrop	Minneapolis City Republican Committee
At-large			LaTrisha Vetaw	Fifth District Green Party
1	Liz Wielinski	2009	Mohamed Barre	
1	Liz Wielinski	2009	Billy Menz	Fifth District Green Party
1	Liz Wielinski	2009	Chris Meyer	Minneapolis DFL
2	Jon Olson	2001	Kale Severson	Minneapolis DFL
2	Jon Olson	2001	Mike Tate	
3	Scott Vreeland	2005	Charles Exner	Fifth District Green Party
3	Scott Vreeland	2005	Abdikadir "AK" Hassan	
3	Scott Vreeland	2005	Abdi Mohamed	
4	Anita Tabb	2009	Jono Cowgill	Minneapolis DFL
4	Anita Tabb	2009	Tom Nordyke	
5	Steffanie Musich	2013	Andrea Fahrenkrug	
5	Steffanie Musich	2013	Steffanie Musich	Minneapolis DFL
5	Steffanie Musich	2013	Bill Shroyer	
6	Brad Bourn	2009	Brad Bourn	Minneapolis DFL
6	Brad Bourn	2009	Bob Fine	
6	Brad Bourn	2009	Robert Schlosser	
6	Brad Bourn	2009	Jennifer Zielinski	Minneapolis City Republican Committee

=== Results ===
Incumbents Meg Forney (At-large), Steffanie Musich (District 5), and Brad Bourn (District 6) were re-elected. Also elected were at-large candidates LaTrisha Vetaw and Londel French, Chris Meyer (District 1), Kale Severson (District 2), Abdikadir "AK" Hassan (District 3), and Jono Cowgill (District 4).

==== At-large ====
Most voted first-choice candidate by precinct

Candidate	% 1st choice	Round 1	Round 2	Round 3	Round 4	% Final
LaTrisha Vetaw	21.96	18,526	19,142	20,529	22,827	27.06
Meg Forney	22.54	19,010	20,366	21,066	22,506	26.68
Londel French	14.71	12,405	12,815	14,308	17,947	21.28
Mike Derus	12.66	10,679	12,335	12,849	13,970	16.56
Russ Henry	10.74	9,056	9,815	11,014		
Devin Hogan	7.41	6,246	6,735			
Charlie Casserly	4.45	3,756				
Jonathan Honerbrink	3.10	2,617				
Bob Sullentrop	1.97	1,659				
Scott Vreeland	0.00	3				
Write-ins	0.46	390				
Exhausted ballots			3,139	4,581	7,097	8.41
Valid votes		84,347				
Threshold		21,087				
Undervotes		21,581				
Turnout	42.45	105,928				
Registered voters		249,512				
Source: Minneapolis Elections & Voter Services

==== District 1 ====
Most voted first-choice candidate by precinct in District 1

Candidate	% 1st choice	Round 1	Round 2	% Final
Chris Meyer	44.45	6,358	7,210	50.41
Billy Menz	35.45	5,070	5,831	40.77
Mohamed Barre	19.53	2,793		
Write-ins	0.57	82		
Exhausted ballots			1,262	8.82
Valid votes		14,303		
Threshold		7,152		
Undervotes		3,482		
Turnout		17,785		
Source: Minneapolis Elections & Voter Services

==== District 2 ====
Most voted first-choice candidate by precinct in District 2

Candidate	% 1st choice	Round 1
Kale Severson	56.96	5,089
Mike Tate	42.29	3,778
Write-ins	0.75	67
Valid votes		8,934
Threshold		4,468
Undervotes		2,228
Turnout		11,162
Source: Minneapolis Elections & Voter Services

==== District 3 ====
Most voted first-choice candidate by precinct in District 3

Candidate	% 1st choice	Round 1	Round 2	% Final
Abdikadir Hassan	48.49	7,094	7,753	52.99
Abdi Mohamed	37.01	5,415	5,841	39.92
Charles Exner	14.14	2,069		
Write-ins	0.36	52		
Exhausted ballots			1,036	7.08
Valid votes		14,630		
Threshold		7,316		
Undervotes		1,971		
Turnout		16,601		
Source: Minneapolis Elections & Voter Services

==== District 4 ====
Most voted first-choice candidate by precinct in District 4

Candidate	% 1st choice	Round 1
Jono Cowgill	50.28	6,794
Tom Nordyke	48.95	6,615
Write-ins	0.77	104
Valid votes		13,513
Threshold		6,757
Undervotes		4,654
Turnout		18,167
Source: Minneapolis Elections & Voter Services

==== District 5 ====
Most voted first-choice candidate by precinct in District 5

Candidate	% 1st choice	Round 1
Steffanie Musich	58.30	9,466
Bill Shroyer	24.57	3,990
Andrea Fahrenkrug	16.57	2,691
Write-ins	0.56	91
Valid votes		16,238
Threshold		8,120
Undervotes		4,377
Turnout		20,615
Source: Minneapolis Elections & Voter Services

==== District 6 ====
Most voted first-choice candidate by precinct in District 6

Candidate	% 1st choice	Round 1	Round 2	% Final
Brad Bourn	43.73	8,084	8,785	47.52
Bob Fine	40.52	7,491	8,471	45.82
Jennifer Zielinski	12.29	2,273		
Bob Schlosser	3.16	584		
Write-ins	0.30	56		
Exhausted ballots			1,232	6.66
Valid votes		18,488		
Threshold		9,245		
Undervotes		3,110		
Turnout		21,598		
Source: Minneapolis Elections & Voter Services
