= Michel Faulkner =

American politician (born 1957)

Personal details
- Born: July 21, 1957 (age 69) Baltimore, Maryland, U.S.
- Party: Republican
- Spouse: Sarai Faulkner
- Education: Virginia Tech (B.A., M.S.)
- Profession: Pastor
- Website: Faulkner for NYC Mayor

Michel J. Faulkner (/ˈmaɪkəl ˈfɔːknər/; born May 21, 1957) is a former New York Jets football player who is the pastor of New Horizon Church in New York City. Faulkner was the 2010 Republican nominee for U.S. Representative for New York's 15th congressional district, and was the 2017 Republican nominee for New York City Comptroller.

== Early life, education, and early career ==
Faulkner was born in Baltimore, Maryland. His mother, Queenita Hairston, a beautician, married Steve Faulkner, a Washington, D.C. police officer. After moving to D.C., he lived and attended elementary school in southeast Washington, D.C. area of Anacostia. His family later moved to Prince George's County, Maryland, where Faulkner attend junior high and was graduated from Bishop McNamara High School in 1975. He was awarded a football scholarship to Virginia Tech, where he was a four-year starter and freshman All-American. In 1980, he was graduated with a Bachelor of Arts in communications and sociology. While at Tech, Faulkner was involved in drama and spoken word presentations where he developed his public speaking abilities.

After college, Faulkner signed with the National Football League and had tryouts with the Oakland Raiders and the Washington Redskins. In 1981, he attended training camp with the New York Jets and spent the 1981–1982 season with the team as a defensive lineman. He was cut from the Jets in 1982 because of a leg injury.

After leaving the Jets in June 1982, Faulkner returned to Washington, D.C., where he attended graduate school at CBN (now Regent University) in Virginia Beach, Virginia. Faulkner moved to Blacksburg, Virginia to complete his Master's Degree in education and career counseling at Virginia Tech. After completing his Master's Degree in 1985, Faulkner met Rev. Jerry Falwell and joined Liberty University as Assistant Dean of Students. In 1987, he was promoted to Vice President for Urban Ministry. In 1988, he moved from Lynchburg, Virginia to the Times Square area of Manhattan.

== Ministry ==
In 1988, Faulkner served as assistant pastor of Lamb's Church in Times Square. Faulkner held the position of Vice President for Community Government Relations at King’s College from 1988 to 1992. In 1989, Faulkner joined Calvary Baptist Church in Midtown Manhattan as a youth pastor. Faulkner was ordained at Calvary Baptist Church in December 1991. In 1993, Faulkner became the senior pastor of Central Baptist Church in Manhattan.

From June 2002 to February 2004, Faulkner served as World Vision’s Director of U.S. Programs. He oversaw the distribution of over $1 million in faith-based community and youth development grants to eight local churches in New York City.

In June 2006, Faulkner founded the New Horizon Church of New York in Harlem. Faulkner describes New Horizon as a Christ-centered congregation focused on "bringing light to the darkness, and being an agent of transformation to bring the Gospel to Harlem."

== Community and civic work ==
Mayor Rudolph Giuliani appointed Faulkner to the Task Force on Police Community Relations following Faulkner's work on Giuliani's campaign. Faulkner has also served as Commissioner of the City Charter Review initiative and as co-chairman for the New York City Board of Education’s HIV/AIDS Task Force. Faulkner served as Regional Chaplain for New York State Office of Children and Family Services from November 2005 to May 2006. Faulkner is a Regional Leader for Christ Covenant Coalition (Clergy Association) and is a guest speaker for national and local radio and television broadcasts including ABC and "Live with Regis and Kelly".

In 2005, Faulkner founded the Institute for Leadership, a non-profit organization to develop leaders and leadership programs. The institute brings leadership principles to all areas and marketplaces such as teachers, business leaders, government officials, other public servants, sports coaches and ministers. Faulkner serves as President of the IFL. The IFL received a grant from New York State Health Foundation in 2009 to run a statewide diabetes campaign for the faith-based community.

== Political career ==
In February 2010, Faulkner announced his candidacy to run as the Republican, Conservative and Jobs Now nominee, challenging Democratic and Working Families incumbent Charlie Rangel for New York's 15th congressional district. Faulkner was inspired to run for office by Scott Brown's successful election to Ted Kennedy's former Senate seat. Faulkner has stated that his reason for running for Congress is his belief that "greed and corruption" is ruining government. He believes that government should work to assist the "powerless" and the "voiceless".

Faulkner was endorsed by Sean Hannity, the New York Right to Life Party, and Congressman John Carter. Faulkner and Republican National Committee Chairman Michael Steele campaigned together in Harlem on October 26, 2010. Steele called Faulkner a strong representative of "new" Republican Party.

In the November 2, 2010, general election, Faulkner received 9,235 votes (10%) of the 102,176 total votes cast, as Rangel won with 80% of the vote.

=== New York City 2017 ===
On September 21, 2015, Faulkner, a registered Republican, announced his candidacy for the 2017 New York City mayoral race, thus becoming the first official candidate to contest incumbent mayor, Bill de Blasio.

In early 2017, Faulkner decided to run for New York City Comptroller instead of Mayor, and endorsed rival Paul Massey for Mayor. Massey subsequently dropped out of the race as well. On November 7, 2017, Faulkner was defeated by incumbent Democratic Comptroller Scott Stringer by a margin of 76.72% to 19.50%.

=== Political issues ===
Faulkner is anti-abortion.

Faulkner has been critical of the law, stating that it was enacted before legislators had read it, it increases federal regulation of health care, it did not contain a provision on tort reform, it did not deregulate insurance sales between states, and it would lead to higher costs and lost jobs.

Faulkner has been critical of the Obama administration's handling of foreign policy, especially as it pertains to Israel. He believes that the national security of the United States is "inextricably tied to Israel's security", and that the U.S. must "ensure that Israel's security is not compromised." Faulkner believes that the real threat to peace in the Middle East is not Israel, but rather the "terrorists such as Hamas, Hezbollah, and other Iranian proxies." Faulkner has also stated that Obama assisted in the delegitimization of Israel and as such Obama's actions "fuel feelings of anti-Semitism."

Faulkner stated that government spending was an important issue for him: "My campaign is not just about Mr. Rangel and his recent indiscretions. It is about stopping the direction in which the government, led by his party, is going. The growing size of the federal government is unbelievable. That’s a bigger scandal than the ethics issue—the size of the debt, the unbridled spending."

During his 2010 congressional campaign, Faulkner appeared on the Imus In The Morning show on Fox Business and WABC, the John Batchelor Show on WABC, the Hannity show on Fox News Channel, and Soul Matters with Rabbi Shimshon Nadel on Arutz 7/Israel National Radio to promote his candidacy.

== Personal life ==
Faulkner was married to his first wife, Virginia, for 31 years until her death in 2014. They had three children. Faulkner is currently married to Sarai Padilla, a psychologist.

== Published works ==
- Restoring The American Dream, Camden House Books, a division of Word & Spirit Resources, (2010) ISBN 1-936314-30-4.
