= 2017 Argentine provincial elections =

Elections took place in a number of Provinces in Argentina in 2017.

They elected 2 governors including Gustavo Valdés and 13 legislatures.

Most of them took place in October, but a few took place earlier in the year.
