= 2017 New York City Public Advocate election =

- November 7, 2017
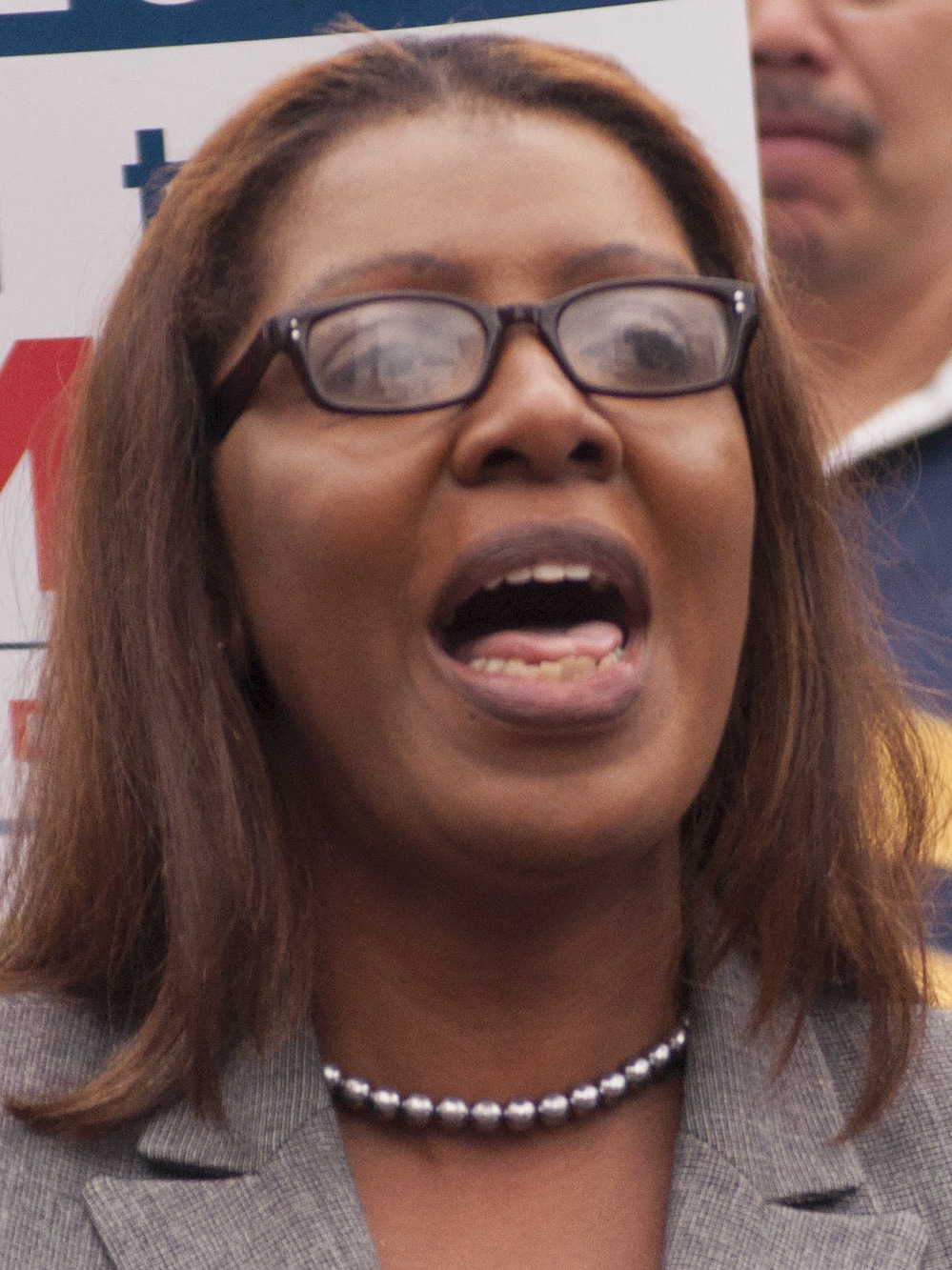

Candidate	Letitia James	J.C Polanco	Michael O'Reilly
Party	Democratic	Republican	Conservative
Alliance	Working Families	Reform; Stop de Blasio
Popular vote	812,235	172,601	88,060
Percentage	73.81%	15.68%	8.00%
- James: 30–40% 40–50% 50–60% 60–70% 70–80% 80–90% >90% Polanco: 30–40% 40–50% 50–60% 60–70% 70–80% >90% O'Reilly: 30–40% 40–50% 50–60% 70–80% >90% Tie: 30–40% 40–50% No votes
Public Advocate before election
Letitia James
Democratic
Elected Public Advocate
Letitia James
Democratic

The 2017 New York City Public Advocate election was held on November 7, 2017. Letitia James defeated challenger David Eisenbach in the Democratic primary on September 12, 2017. To date, James is the last citywide Democrat to carry Staten Island in a general election.

== General ==
=== Endorsements ===
Letitia James (D)

Newspapers

- Amsterdam News
- Queens Tribune

=== Results ===
Results of the 2017 New York City Public Advocate election
Candidate	Party	Popular vote	
Candidate	Party	#	%
Letitia James (incumbent)	Democratic	752,476	68.38
Letitia James (incumbent)	Working Families	59,759	5.43
Letitia James (incumbent)	Total	812,235	73.81
J.C. Polanco	Republican	162,780	14.79
J.C. Polanco	Reform	6,065	0.55
J.C. Polanco	Stop de Blasio	3,756	0.34
J.C. Polanco	Total	172,601	15.68
Michael O'Reilly	Conservative	88,060	8.00
James Lane	Green	19,404	1.76
Devin Balkind	Libertarian	6,737	0.61
Write-ins		1,407	0.13
Valid votes		1,100,444	94.35
Invalid votes		65,870	5.65
Total votes cast		1,166,314	100
