= 2022 local electoral calendar =

Local elections held in 2022

This local electoral calendar for 2022 lists the subnational elections held in 2022. Referendums, recall and retention elections, and national by-elections (special elections) are also included.

== January ==
- 9 January: Venezuela, Barinas, Governor
- 11 January: United States, Florida's 20th congressional district, U.S. House of Representatives special election
- 16 January: Italy, Rome Trionfale by-election
- 23 January
  - Finland, County Elections
  - Senegal, departmental and municipal elections

== February ==
- 3 February: United Kingdom, Southend West, House of Commons by-election
- 5 February: Nigeria, Kebbi, Local Government Councils and Chairmen
- 6 February: Japan, Yamaguchi Prefecture, Governor
- 10 February – 7 March: India, Uttar Pradesh, Legislative Assembly
- 12 February: Nigeria, Federal Capital Territory, Area Councils and Chairmen
- 12 February:
  - Australia, New South Wales
    - Bega, Legislative Assembly by-election
    - Monaro, Legislative Assembly by-election
    - Strathfield, Legislative Assembly by-election
    - Willoughby, Legislative Assembly by-election

Australia, New South Wales by-elections, Fifty-seventh Legislative Assembly 2019–2023

- 13 February: Spain, Castile and León, Cortes of Castile and León
- 14 February: India
  - Goa, Legislative Assembly
  - Uttarakhand, Legislative Assembly
- 15 February: Canada, Saskatchewan, Athabasca, Legislative Assembly by-election
- 20 February:
  - India, Punjab, Legislative Assembly
  - Japan, Nagasaki Prefecture, Governor
- 23 February: Nigeria, Enugu, Local Government Councils and Chairmen
- 26 February: Nigeria
  - Akure North/Akure South Federal Constituency, House of Representatives by-election
  - Jos North/Bassa Federal Constituency, House of Representatives by-election
  - Ogoja/Yala Federal Constituency, House of Representatives by-election
- 28 February – 5 March: India, Manipur, Legislative Assembly

== March ==
- 3 March: United Kingdom, Birmingham Erdington, House of Commons by-election
- 12 March:
  - Malaysia, Johor, Legislative Assembly
  - Nigeria, Imo, Local Government Councils and Chairmen
- 13 March: Japan, Ishikawa Prefecture, Governor
- 15 March: Canada, Alberta, Fort McMurray-Lac La Biche, Legislative Assembly by-election
- 16 March: Netherlands, municipal elections
- 19 March: Australia, South Australia, House of Assembly and Legislative Council
- 20 March: France
  - Saint Barthélemy, Territorial Council (1st round)
  - Saint Martin, Territorial Council (1st round)
  - Saint Pierre and Miquelon, Territorial Council (1st round)
  - Wallis and Futuna, Territorial Assembly
- 22 March: Canada, Manitoba, Fort Whyte, Legislative Assembly by-election
- 26 March:
  - Palestine, Local elections
  - Zimbabwe, By-elections
- 27 March:
  - France
    - Saint Barthélemy, Territorial Council (2nd round)
    - Saint Martin, Territorial Council (2nd round)
    - Saint Pierre and Miquelon, Territorial Council (2nd round)
  - Germany, Saarland, Landtag

== April ==
- 3 April: Serbia, Local elections
- 10 April:
  - Japan, Kyoto Prefecture, Governor
  - Nigeria, Adamawa, Local Government Councils and Chairmen
- 11 April:
  - Canada, Quebec, Marie-Victorin, National Assembly by-election
  - Nigeria, Katsina, Local Government Councils and Chairmen
- 19 April: Nigeria, Edo, Local Government Councils and Chairmen
- 30 April: Canada, British Columbia, Vancouver-Quilchena, Legislative Assembly by-election

== May ==
- 5 May: United Kingdom, Local elections
  - Northern Ireland, Assembly
- 7 May:
  - Australia, Tasmania, (Elwick, McIntyre and Huon by-election) Legislative Council
  - Nigeria, Benue, Local Government Councils and Chairmen
- 8 May: Germany, Schleswig-Holstein, Landtag
- 9 May: Philippines, provincial, city and municipal
- 13 May: Nepal, local elections
- 14 May: Iceland, municipal
- 15 May:
  - Germany, North Rhine-Westphalia, Landtag
  - Italy
    - Trentino-Alto Adige/Südtirol, Local elections (1st round)
    - Aosta Valley, Local elections (1st round)
- 17 May: United States, Portland, Auditor and City Commission (1st round)
- 22 May: Thailand
  - Bangkok, Governor and Metropolitan Council
  - Pattaya, Mayor and City Council
- 29 May:
  - Japan, Niigata Prefecture, Governor
  - Italy, Trentino-Alto Adige/Südtirol, Local elections (2nd round)

== June ==
- 1 June: South Korea, local elections
- 2 June: Canada, Ontario, Legislative Assembly of Ontario
- 5 June:
  - Cambodia, Communal elections
  - Mexico, local elections
- 7 June: Canada, Manitoba, Thompson, Legislative Assembly by-election
- 12 June:
  - Italy
    - Local elections (1st round)
    - Aosta Valley, Local elections (2nd round)
- 14 June: United States, Texas's 34th congressional district, U.S. House of Representatives special election
- 18 June:
  - Australia, Queensland, Callide, Legislative Assembly by-election
  - New Zealand, Tauranga, House of Representatives by-election
  - Nigeria, Ekiti, Governor
- 19 June: Spain, Andalusia, Parliament of Andalusia
- 20 June: Canada, New Brunswick, Legislative Assembly by-elections
- 22 June: United Kingdom, Jersey, States Assembly
- 23 June:
  - United Kingdom
    - Tiverton and Honiton, House of Commons by-election
    - Wakefield, House of Commons by-election
- 26 June: Italy, Local elections (2nd round)
- 28 June:
  - Liberia, Lofa, Senatorial by-election
  - United States, Nebraska's 1st congressional district, U.S. House of Representatives special election

== July ==
- 2 July: Australia, South Australia, Bragg, House of Assembly by-election
- 10 July: Republic of Congo, local election
- 10 July: Japan, Shiga Prefecture, Governor
- 16 July: Nigeria, Osun, Governor
- 17 July: Pakistan, Punjab, Provincial Assembly by-election

== August ==
- 7 August: Japan, Nagano Prefecture, Governor
- 9 August: United States, Minnesota's 1st congressional district, U.S. House of Representatives special election
- 14 August: Thailand, Kalasin province, Chief Executive of Provincial Administrative Organization
- 16 August: United States, Alaska's at-large congressional district, U.S. House of Representatives special election
- 20 August: Australia, Northern Territory, Fannie Bay, Legislative Assembly by-election
- 23 August:
  - United States
    - New York's 19th congressional district, U.S. House of Representatives special election
    - New York's 23rd congressional district, U.S. House of Representatives special election
- 28 August: Japan, Kagawa Prefecture, Governor

== September ==
- 3 September: Philippines, Calaca, cityhood plebiscite
- 10 September:
  - Canada, British Columbia, Surrey South, Legislative Assembly by-election
  - Australia, Tasmania, Pembroke, Legislative Council by-election
- 11 September:
  - Japan, Okinawa Prefecture, Governor
  - Russia, Governors (1st round), Legislative Assemblies
  - Sweden, local and regional elections together with the general elections
- 17 September:
  - Australia, Western Australia, North West Central, Legislative Assembly by-election
  - Philippines, Maguindanao, provincial division plebiscite
- 18 September: Syria, Local elections
- 23–27 September: 2022 annexation referendums in Russian-occupied Ukraine
- 24 and 25 September: Czech Republic, Municipal election
- 25 September:
  - Italy, Sicily, Regional election
  - Russia, Governors (2nd round, if necessary)
  - Austria, Tyrolean state election
  - Thailand, Roi Et province, Chief Executive of Provincial Administrative Organization
- 26 September: Canada, Saskatchewan, Saskatoon Meewasin, Legislative Assembly by-election

== October ==
- 2 October:
  - Brazil, Governors (1st round) and Legislative Assemblies
  - France, Yvelines 2nd constituency, National Assembly by-election (1st round)
  - Peru, Regional and municipal elections
  - Bosnia and Herzegovina
    - Federation of Bosnia and Herzegovina, House of Representatives and assemblies of cantons
    - Republika Srpska, President and National Assembly
- 3 October: Canada, Quebec, National Assembly of Quebec
- 8 October: New Zealand, local elections
- 9 October:
  - France, Yvelines 2nd constituency, National Assembly by-election (2nd round)
  - Germany, Lower Saxony, Landtag
- 15 October:
  - Canada, British Columbia, municipal elections
  - Nigeria, Osun, Local Government Councils and Chairmen
- 20 October: United Kingdom, Ascension, Island Council
- 24 October: Canada, Ontario, municipal elections
- 26 October: Canada, Manitoba, municipal elections
  - Winnipeg, municipal elections
- 29 October: Slovakia, Regional elections and local elections
- 30 October:
  - Brazil, Governors (2nd round, if necessary)
  - Japan, Fukushima Prefecture, Governor

== November ==
- 6 November: Nicaragua, Municipal elections
- 8 November:
  - United States, Midterm elections
    - District of Columbia
      - Mayor
      - Attorney General
      - Council
    - Alabama
      - Governor, Lieutenant Governor, Attorney General, Secretary of State, Treasurer, Auditor
      - Allow Denial of Bail for Offenses Enumerated by State Legislature Amendment, Authorize Certain Cities to Use Special Property Tax Revenue to Pay for Capital Improvements Directly Amendment, Prohibit Changes to Election Conduct Laws within Six Months of General Elections Amendment, and Remove Orphans' Business from Probate Court Jurisdiction Amendment referendums
      - Senate and House of Representatives
    - Alaska
      - Governor and Lieutenant Governor
      - House of Representatives and Senate
      - Constitutional Convention Question referendum
    - Arizona
      - Governor, Attorney General, State Treasurer, Secretary of State, Superintendent of Public Instruction and Corporation Commission
      - House of Representatives and Senate
      - Supreme Court retention
      - In-State Tuition for Non-Citizen Residents Measure, Legislative Changes to Ballot Initiatives with Invalid Provisions Amendment, Reduce Number of Income Tax Brackets to Flat Rate of 2.50%, and Single-Subject Requirement for Ballot Initiatives Amendment referendums
    - Arkansas
      - Governor, Lieutenant Governor, Secretary of State, Attorney General, State Treasurer and State Auditor
      - House of Representatives and Senate
      - 60% Supermajority Vote Requirement for Constitutional Amendments and Ballot Initiatives Measure, Government Burden of Free Exercise of Religion Amendment, and Legislature Power to Convene Special Sessions Amendment referendums
    - California
      - Governor, Lieutenant Governor, Attorney General, Secretary of State, Treasurer, Controller, Insurance Commissioner, Superintendent of Public Instruction and Board of Equalization
      - Assembly and Senate
      - Changes to Medical Malpractice Lawsuits Cap Initiative, Flavored Tobacco Products Ban, Legalize Sports Betting on American Indian Lands Initiative, and Plastic Waste Reduction Regulations Initiative referendums
    - Colorado
      - Governor, Attorney General, Board of Education, Secretary of State and Treasurer
      - House of Representatives and Senate
      - State Income Tax Rate Reduction Initiative referendum
    - Connecticut
      - Governor and Lieutenant Governor, Attorney General, Secretary of State, and Comptroller
      - Senate and House of Representatives
      - Allow for Early Voting Amendment referendum
    - Delaware
      - Attorney General, Treasurer, and Auditor
      - House of Representatives and Senate
    - Florida
      - Governor and Lieutenant Governor, Attorney General, Chief Financial Officer, and Commissioner of Agriculture
      - House of Representatives and Senate
      - Supreme Court retention
      - Amendment 1 and Amendment 2 referendums
    - Georgia
      - Governor, Lieutenant Governor, Attorney General, Commissioner of Agriculture, Commissioner of Insurance, Commissioner of Labor, Public Service Commission, Secretary of State, and Superintendent of Schools
      - House of Representatives and Senate
      - Supreme Court retention
    - Hawaii
      - Governor and Lieutenant Governor
      - House of Representatives and Senate
    - Idaho
      - Governor, Lieutenant Governor, Attorney General, Controller, Secretary of State, Treasurer and Superintendent of Public Instruction
      - House of Representatives and Senate
    - Illinois
      - Governor, Attorney General, Comptroller, Secretary of State and Treasurer
      - House of Representatives and Senate
      - Supreme Court and Appellate Court retention elections, and Appellate Court
      - Cook County, Assessor, Board of Commissioners, Board of Commissioners President, Board of Review, Clerk, Sheriff, Treasurer and Water Reclamation District Board
    - Indiana
      - Auditor, Secretary of State and Treasurer
      - House of Representatives and Senate
      - Supreme Court and Court of Appeals retention elections
    - Iowa
      - Governor, Attorney General, Auditor, Secretary of Agriculture, Secretary of State and Treasurer
      - House of Representatives and Senate
      - Court of Appeals retention elections
    - Kansas
      - Governor, Attorney General, Board of Education, Commissioner of Insurance, Secretary of State and Treasurer
      - House of Representatives
      - Court of Appeals retention elections
    - Kentucky
      - House of Representatives and Senate
      - Supreme Court and Court of Appeals
      - Louisville, Mayor and Metropolitan Council
    - Louisiana
      - Public Service Commission
      - Supreme Court and Circuit Courts of Appeal
    - Maine
      - Governor
      - House of Representatives and Senate
    - Maryland
      - Governor, Attorney General and Comptroller
      - House of Delegates and Senate
      - Court of Appeals and Court of Special Appeals retention elections
      - County Executives
    - Massachusetts
      - Governor, Attorney General, Auditor, Governor's Council, Secretary of the Commonwealth and Treasurer
      - House of Representatives and Senate
    - Michigan
      - Governor, Attorney General, Board of Education and Secretary of State
      - House of Representatives and Senate
      - Supreme Court and Court of Appeals
    - Minnesota
      - Governor, Attorney General, Auditor and Secretary of State
      - House of Representatives and Senate
      - Supreme Court and Court of Appeals
      - Hennepin County, County Attorney
    - Mississippi
      - Court of Appeals
    - Missouri
      - Auditor
      - House of Representatives and Senate
      - Supreme Court and Court of Appeals retention elections
      - Amendment 1, Constitutional Convention Question, Department of the National Guard Amendment, and Allow Legislature to Require a City to Increase Funding without State Reimbursement for a Police Force Established by State Board Amendment referendums
    - Montana
      - Public Service Commission
      - House of Representatives and Senate
      - Supreme Court
      - Search Warrant for Electronic Data Amendment and Medical Care Requirements for Born-Alive Infants Measure referendums
    - Nebraska
      - Governor, Attorney General, Auditor, Board of Education, Public Service Commission, Secretary of State and Treasurer
      - Legislature
    - Nevada
      - Governor, Lieutenant Governor, Attorney General, State Controller, Secretary of State and Treasurer
      - Assembly and Senate
      - Supreme Court
      - Clark County, County Commission
    - New Hampshire
      - Governor and Executive Council
      - House of Representatives and Senate
    - New Mexico
      - Governor, Attorney General, Auditor, Commissioner of Public Lands, Public Education Commission, Public Regulation Commission, Secretary of State and Treasurer
      - House of Representatives
      - Court of Appeals retention election, and Supreme Court and Court of Appeals
    - New York
      - Governor, Attorney General and Comptroller
      - Assembly and Senate
    - North Carolina
      - House of Representatives and Senate
      - Supreme Court and Court of Appeals
      - Charlotte, Mayor and City Council
      - Raleigh, Mayor and City Council
    - North Dakota
      - Agriculture Commissioner, Attorney General, Public Service Commission, Secretary of State and Tax Commissioner
      - House of Representatives and Senate
      - Supreme Court
    - Ohio
      - Governor, Attorney General, Auditor, Board of Education, Secretary of State and Treasurer
      - House of Representatives and Senate
      - Supreme Court and District Courts of Appeals
      - Cuyahoga County, Executive
    - Oklahoma
      - Governor, Lieutenant Governor, Attorney General, Auditor, Corporation Commissioner, Commissioner of Insurance, Commissioner of Labor, Superintendent of Public Instruction and Treasurer
      - House of Representatives and Senate
      - Supreme Court, Court of Criminal Appeals and Court of Civil Appeals retention elections
    - Oregon
      - Governor and Commissioner of Labor
      - House of Representatives and Senate
      - Supreme Court and Court of Appeals
      - Portland, City Commission (2nd round)
    - Pennsylvania
      - Governor
      - House of Representatives and Senate
    - Rhode Island
      - Governor, Lieutenant governor, Attorney General, Secretary of State and Treasurer
      - House of Representatives and Senate
    - South Carolina
      - Governor, Attorney General, Commissioner of Agriculture, Comptroller, Secretary of State, Superintendent of Education and Treasurer
      - House of Representatives
    - South Dakota
      - Governor, Attorney General, Auditor, Commissioner of Public Lands, Public Utilities Commissioner, Secretary of State and Treasurer
      - House of Representatives and Senate
    - Tennessee
      - Governor
      - House of Representatives and Senate
    - Texas
      - Governor, Lieutenant Governor, Attorney General, Board of Education, Commissioner of Agriculture, Commissioner of the General Land Office, Comptroller and Railroad Commissioner
      - House of Representatives and Senate
      - Supreme Court, Court of Criminal Appeals and Courts of Appeals
      - Austin, Mayor (1st round) and City council
      - Corpus Christi, Mayor and City council
      - El Paso, City council
      - Laredo, Mayor (1st round) and City council
      - Harris County, County Judge
    - Utah
      - Treasurer special election and Board of Education
      - House of Representatives and Senate
    - Vermont
      - Governor, Lieutenant Governor, Attorney General, Auditor, Secretary of State and Treasurer
      - House of Representatives and Senate
    - Virginia
      - Virginia Beach, City Council
    - Washington
      - Secretary of State special election
      - House of Representatives and Senate
      - Supreme Court and Court of Appeals
    - West Virginia
      - House of Delegates and Senate
    - Wisconsin
      - Governor, Attorney General, Secretary of State and Treasurer
      - Assembly and Senate
    - Wyoming
      - Governor, Auditor, Secretary of State, Superintendent of Public Instruction and Treasurer
      - House of Representatives and Senate
  - Canada, Alberta, Brooks-Medicine Hat, Legislative Assembly by-election
- 12 November: India, Himachal Pradesh, Legislative Assembly
- 19 November: Malaysia, state elections
  - Pahang, Legislative Assembly
  - Perak, Legislative Assembly
  - Perlis, Legislative Assembly
- 20 November:
  - Japan, Ehime Prefecture, Governor
  - Slovenia, local elections
- 26 November
  - Australia, Victoria, Legislative Assembly and Legislative Council
  - Taiwan, local elections
- 27 November:
  - Japan, Wakayama Prefecture, Governor
  - Cuba, local elections
- 28 November: Canada, New Brunswick, municipal elections

== December ==
- 1 December
  - United Kingdom, City of Chester, House of Commons by-election
  - India, Gujarat, Legislative Assembly (1st phase)
- 5 December: India, Gujarat, Legislative Assembly (2nd phase)
- 6 December: United States, Georgia, U.S Senate (2nd round)
- 7 December: Malaysia
  - Padang Serai, House of Representatives by-election
  - Pahang, Tioman, Legislative Assembly by-election
- 10 December: New Zealand, Hamilton West by-election
- 12 December:
  - Canada, Mississauga Lakeshore, House of Commons by-election
  - Saint Kitts and Nevis, Nevis Island Assembly
- 13 December: Canada, Manitoba, Kirkfield Park, Legislative Assembly by-election
- 15 December: United Kingdom, Stretford and Urmston, House of Commons by-election
- 16 December: Philippines, Baliuag, Bulacan, cityhood and renaming plebiscite
- 18 December: Japan, Saga Prefecture, Governor
- 25 December: Japan, Miyazaki Prefecture, Governor

== See also ==
- 2022 United States ballot measures
