= Bettina Cointre =

French politician

Bettina Cointre is a French politician and teacher from Saint Barthélemy, who was first elected in 2012 to the island's Territorial Council. She stood for election against Bruno Magras in the 2017 elections. As of 2020 she was the leader of the political party Tous pour Saint-Barth (All for Saint Barth).
