= List of elections in 2022 =

The following elections were scheduled to occur in 2022. The National Democratic Institute also maintains a calendar of elections around the world.

- 2022 United Nations Security Council election
- 2022 national electoral calendar
- 2022 local electoral calendar

== Africa ==
- Angola
  - 2022 Angolan general election 24 August 2022
- Equatorial Guinea
  - 2022 Equatorial Guinean general election 20 November 2022
- Gambia
  - 2022 Gambian parliamentary election 9 April 2022
- Kenya
  - 2022 Kenyan general election 9 August 2022
- Liberia
  - 2022 Liberian by-election, 28 June 2022
- Lesotho
  - 2022 Lesotho general election 7 October 2022
- Republic of Congo
  - 2022 Republic of the Congo parliamentary election 10 July 2022
- Senegal
- 2022 Senegalese local elections 23 January 2022
- 2022 Senegalese parliamentary election 31 July 2022
- Sao Tome
  - 2022 São Toméan legislative election 25 September 2022
- Tunisia
- 2022 Tunisian parliamentary election 17 December 2022

== Americas ==
- Barbados
  - 2022 Barbadian general election 19 January 2022
- Brazil
  - 2022 Brazilian general election 2 October and 30 October 2022
- Chile
  - 2022 Chilean constitutional referendum, 4 September 2022
- Costa Rica
- 2022 Costa Rican general election 6 February and 3 April 2022
- Colombia
  - 2022 Colombian parliamentary election 13 March 2022
  - 2022 Colombian presidential election 29 May 2022
- Canada
  - 43rd Ontario general election 2 June 2022
  - 43rd Quebec general election 3 October 2022
- Cuba
  - 2022 Cuban Family Code referendum 25 September 2022
  - 2022 Cuban local elections, 27 November 2022
- Dominica
  - 2022 Dominican general election 6 December 2022
- Grenada
- 2022 Grenadian general election 23 June 2022
- Mexico
  - 2022 Mexican presidential recall referendum 10 April 2022
  - 2022 Mexican local elections 5 June 2022
- Nicaragua
  - 2022 Nicaraguan local elections 6 November 2022
- Peru
  - 2022 Peruvian regional and municipal elections 2 October 2022
- Saint Kitts and Nevis
  - 2022 Saint Kitts and Nevis general election 5 August 2022
- United States
  - 2022 United States elections 8 November 2022
- Uruguay
  - 2022 Uruguayan Law of Urgent Consideration referendum 27 March 2022

== Asia ==
- 2022 elections in India
- 2022 South Korean presidential election 9 March 2022
- Malaysia
  - 2022 Johor state election 12 March 2022
  - 2022 Malaysian general election 19 November 2022
- 2022 Abkhazian parliamentary election 12 March 2022, 26 March 2022, 14 May 2022 and 28 May 2022
- 2022 Turkmenistan presidential election 12 March 2022
- 2022 East Timorese presidential election 19 April 2022
- Philippine general election
  - 2022 Philippine presidential election 9 May 2022
  - 2022 Philippine Senate election 9 May 2022
  - 2022 Philippine House of Representatives elections 9 May 2022
- 2022 Lebanese general election 15 May 2022
- 2022 Thailand Bangkok gubernatorial election 22 May 2022
- 2022 Japanese House of Councillors election 10 July 2022
- 2022 Syrian local elections 18 September 2022
- 2022 Kuwaiti general election 29 September 2022
- 2022 Iraqi presidential election 13 October 2022
- 2022 Pakistani by-elections 16 October and 30 October 2022
- 2022 Israeli legislative election 1 November 2022
- 2022 Bahraini general election 12 November 2022
- 2022 Kazakh presidential election 20 November 2022
- 2022 Nepalese general election 20 November 2022
- 2022 Taiwanese local elections 26 November 2022

== Europe ==
- 2022 Italian presidential election 24-29 January 2022
- 2022 Portuguese legislative election 30 January 2022
- Spain
  - 2022 Castilian-Leonese regional election 13 February 2022
  - 2022 Andalusian regional election 19 June 2022
- 2022 Maltese parliamentary election 26 March 2022
- Germany
  - 2022 German presidential election 13 February 2022
  - 2022 Saarland state election 27 March 2022
  - 2022 Schleswig-Holstein state election 8 May 2022
  - 2022 North Rhine Westphalia state election 15 May 2022
  - 2022 Lower Saxony state election 9 October 2022
- Hungary
  - 2022 Hungarian presidential election 10 March 2022
  - 2022 Hungarian parliamentary election 3 April 2022
- 2022 Serbian general election 3 April 2022
- France
  - 2022 French presidential election 10 and 24 April 2022
  - 2022 French legislative election 12 and 19 June 2022
- Montenegro
  - 2022 Montenegrin municipal elections March and 23 October
- Serbia
  - 2022 Serbian local elections 3 April 2022
- Slovenia
  - 2022 Slovenian parliamentary election 24 April 2022
  - 2022 Slovenian presidential election 23 October 2022
- 2022 Northern Ireland Assembly election 5 May 2022
- 2022 Swedish general election 11 September 2022
- Czech Republic
  - 2022 Czech Senate election 23–24 September, 30 September–1 October 2022
  - 2022 Czech municipal elections, 23–24 September
- Italy
  - 2022 Italian general election 25 September 2022
  - 2022 Italian by-elections 16 January 2022
  - 2022 Sicilian regional election 25 September 2022
- 2022 Latvian parliamentary election 1 October 2022
- 2022 Bosnian general election 2 October 2022
- 2022 Bulgarian parliamentary election 2 October 2022
- 2022 Austrian presidential election 9 October 2022
- Slovakia
  - 2022 Slovak local elections 29 October 2022
  - 2022 Slovak regional elections 29 October 2022
- 2022 Danish general election 1 November 2022

== Oceania ==
- Australia
  - 2022 South Australian state election 19 March 2022
  - 2022 Australian federal election 21 May 2022
  - 2022 Victorian state election 26 November 2022
- 2022 Papua New Guinean general election 4–22 July 2022
- 2022 New Zealand local elections 16 September-8 October 2022
- 2022 Nauruan parliamentary election 24 September 2022
- 2022 Vanuatuan general election 13 October 2022
- 2022 Fijian general election 14 December 2022
