= Karine Miot-Richard =

Lawyer and politician in Saint Barthélemy

Karine Miot-Richard (September 23, 1964 – May 2018) was a lawyer and politician in Saint Barthélemy. She was the leader of the All United for Saint Barthélemy party (Tous unis pour St-Barthélemy) and served on the Territorial Council of Saint Barthélemy for 10 years.

== Biography ==
Miot-Richard was born in 1964 in Le Mans, France. She worked as a lawyer in Saint Barthélemy.

She first ran for office in Saint Barthélemy on the opposition slate in the 2001 municipal elections. In 2007, she ran for the Territorial Council of Saint Barthélemy as the head of the All United for Saint Barthélemy party, the only woman to head a party list that year.

After being elected in 2007, Miot-Richard served on the Territorial Council for 10 years. She worked closely with the ruling party over the course of her first term, and for the 2012 election she joined longtime president Bruno Magras' Saint-Barth d'Abord electoral list.

Miot-Richard became the head of the country's Urban Planning Commission in January 2008, a role she continued in during the following term beginning in 2012. She also served as an alternate for Daniel Gibbs during his time representing Saint Barthélemy and Saint-Martin in the French National Assembly.

In addition to her legislative role, she continued to work as a lawyer, but she recused herself from political debates involving her clients.

Miot-Richard died in France in early May of 2018, at the age of 53.
