= Micheline Jacques =

French politician (born 1971)

Member of the French Senate for Saint Barthélemy
- Incumbent
- Assumed office 1 October 2020
- Preceded by: Michel Magras

Personal details
- Born: 8 October 1971 (age 54)
- Party: The Republicans
- Education: University of the French West Indies and Guiana

Micheline Jacques (born 8 October 1971) is a French Barthélemois politician. She has served in the French Senate for Saint Barthélemy since 1 October 2020 as a member of The Republicans (LR). Jacques is the first woman to represent Saint Barthélemy in the national Senate since the seat's creation in 2008.

== Biography ==
Jacques is the third vice-president of Saint Barthélemy as a member of the island's Territorial Council. During the 2017 French legislative election for Saint Barthélemy and Saint-Martin's 1st constituency, Micheline Jacques campaigned on behalf of National Assembly candidate Claire Guion-Firmin, who won the second round with 55% of the vote to defeat the nominee from the La République En Marche! party.

In 2020, incumbent Senator Michel Magras of the LR declined to seek re-election. Micheline Jacques, the third vice-president of Saint Barthélemy, was the only candidate nominated to succeed Magras in the Senate. She was elected unopposed in the 2020 French Senate election on 27 September 2020, receiving 100% of the 12 electoral votes cast.

Petrus took office on 1 October 2020, becoming the first woman to represent Saint Martin in the French Senate. She sits within the LR parliamentary group.
