= 2007 Saint Barthélemy Territorial Council election =

Elections to the Territorial Council were held in the French overseas collectivity of Saint Barthélemy for the first time on 1 July 2007. Since Bruno Magras, the incumbent mayor of Saint Barthélemy, got an absolute majority in the first round, a second round was not held. If a second round had been necessary, it would have been held on 8 July 2007.

== Results ==
| Party | Votes | % | Seats |
|---|---|---|---|
| Saint Barth First!–UMP | 2,399 | 72.24 | 16 |
| All United for Saint Barthélemy | 330 | 9.94 | 1 |
| Action Balance and Transparence | 330 | 9.94 | 1 |
| Together for Saint Barthélemy | 262 | 7.89 | 1 |
| Total | 3,321 | 100.00 | 19 |
| Valid votes | 3,321 | 98.90 | |
| Invalid/blank votes | 37 | 1.10 | |
| Total votes | 3,358 | 100.00 | |
| Registered voters/turnout | 4,759 | 70.56 | |
Source: Le Journal
