= Magras =

Magras is a French surname. Notable people with the surname include:

- Bruno Magras (b. 1951), French politician
- Michel Magras (b. 1954), French politician

== See also ==
- Magra (disambiguation)
- Magrs
