= List of senators of Saint Barthélemy =

Location of Saint Barthélemy in France

Following is a list of senators of Saint Barthélemy, people who have represented the overseas collectivity of Saint Barthélemy in the French Senate. The seat was established for the 2008 election after the collectivity was created in 2007.

Saint Barthélemy has been allocated one seat since it has been represented in the Senate. Since 2020 the senator for Saint Barthélemy has been Micheline Jacques who sits with the Senate Republicans. She was elected unopposed and re-elected in 2026 with over 68% of the first-round vote.

== Election ==
The lone senator from Saint Barthélemy, like all national senators, is elected for a six-year term. The senator is selected through an indirect election by the twenty-one "great electors" of Saint Barthélemy. The electors are composed of all nineteen members of the Territorial Council of Saint Barthélemy, the incumbent Senator for Saint Barthélemy, and the national deputy of the French National Assembly for Saint Barthélemy and Saint-Martin's 1st constituency.

== Fifth Republic ==
Senators for Saint Barthélemy under the Fifth Republic have been:

Name	Took office	Left office	Group	Notes
Michel Magras	1 October 2008	30 September 2020	Republicans (REP)	
Micheline Jacques	1 October 2020	In office	Republicans (REP)	

== Sources ==
- Liste des anciens sénateurs de la Vème République par circonscription (in French), Sénat de France
- Liste par département - Saint-Barthélemy (in French), Sénat de France
