= List of universities in Guadeloupe =

This is a list of universities in Guadeloupe.

== Universities ==
- University of the French West Indies and Guiana - Two Guadeloupe campuses (Pointe-à-Pitre and Saint-Claude)

== See also ==
- Lists of universities and colleges by country
