= All United for Saint Barthélemy =

All United for Saint Barthélemy (Tous unis pour St-Barthélemy) is a political party in Saint Barthélemy, led by Karine Miot-Richard. It won in the 1 July 2007 Territorial Council elections 1 out of 19 seats.
