= Action Balance and Transparence =

Political party in Saint Barthélemy

- Leader: Maxime Desouches

Action Balance and Transparence (Action Équilibre et Transparence) is a political party in Saint Barthélemy (an overseas collectivity of France), led by Maxime Desouches. It won 1 out of 19 seats in the 1 July 2007 Territorial Council elections.
