= Magra (disambiguation) =

The Magra is a river in northern Italy.

Magra may also refer to:

- Magra, California, an unincorporated community in California, United States
- Magra, Tasmania, a locality in Tasmania, Australia
- Magra Islet, a small island in Queensland, Australia
- Magra District, a district in Algeria
  - Magra, Algeria, a town and commune in the Algerian district
- Magra sheep, a breed of sheep found in India
- Mogra, Hooghly, a village in the West Bengal state of India
- Magra Church, Sweden

== See also ==
- Magras, a surname
- Magrahat or Magra Hat, a town in West Bengal, India
  - Magra Hat railway station
