= Together for Saint Barthélemy =

Together for Saint Barthélemy (Ensemble pour St-Barthélemy) is a political party in Saint Barthélemy, led by Benoît Chauvin. It won in the 1 July 2007 Territorial Council elections out of 19 seats.
