= List of universities in Martinique =

University list

This is a list of universities in Martinique.

== Universities ==
- Campus Caraïbéen des Arts
- University of the French West Indies and Guiana - Martinique campus

== See also ==
- List of universities by country
