= Jacques Adélaïde-Merlande =

French historian (1933–2024)

- Born: 1 June 1933; Fort-de-France, Martinique
- Died: 14 November 2024 (aged 91); Les Abymes, Guadeloupe
- Occupation: President of the Société d'histoire de la Guadeloupe

Academic background
- Education: Sorbonne

Jacques Adélaïde-Merlande (1 June 1933 – 14 November 2024) was a French historian. He was a lecturer at the University of the West Indies and Guyana, of which he served as president from 1972 to 1977, before later becoming the president of the Guadeloupe Historical Society.

== Biography ==
=== Early life and education ===
Jacques Adélaïde-Merlande was born in Fort-de-France and was of Guadeloupean and Martiniquean origin. After completing part of his studies in Martinique, he studied at the Sorbonne, where he became interested in the history of colonisation under the direction of Charles-André Julien and in the history of the labour movement under the direction of Jean Bruhat. In particular, he took a postgraduate diploma (diplôme d'études supérieures) on the birth of the Martinique workers' movement under the direction of Charles-André Julien and Jean Bruhat. At the same time, he was active in the Martinique Students' Association.

=== Academic career ===
Adélaïde-Merlande was admitted to the agrégation d'histoire in 1962. In 1964, he was the first director of the Centre d'enseignement supérieur littéraire de Pointe-à-Pitre, a forerunner of the University of the French Antilles. In 1972, he became the first president of the Centre Universitaire Antilles-Guyane until 1977.

He taught courses in contemporary history, but also in ancient history, particularly in the context of preparation for teaching examinations.

He was an important leader of the Société d'histoire de la Guadeloupe and Martinique and one of the founders of the Association of Caribbean Historians in 1969.

In October 2000, he was awarded an honorary doctorate by the University of the West Indies.

=== Death ===
Adélaïde-Merlande died on 14 November 2024, at the age of 91.

== Study ==
Adélaïde-Merlande worked to popularise the history of Guadeloupe during the revolutionary period and the origins of the West Indian workers' movement. The publication of the Historial antillais, of which he edited volumes 3 and 4, gave fresh impetus in French-language West Indian historical studies. Furthermore, his work as a founder and leader of learned societies also played a key role in the development of Caribbean historical studies.

== Publications ==
Jacques Adélaïde-Merlande's work includes numerous articles, published mainly in the Bulletin of the Société d'histoire de la Guadeloupe, the Revue du CERC and the Cahiers du Cerag, and papers, mainly at the congresses of the Association des historiens de la Caraïbe.

- Les origines du mouvement ouvrier en Martinique, 1870-1900, DES, June 1958, Université de la Sorbonne, ed. Pointe-à-Pitre: Cahiers du CERAG, roneo, No. 26, 1972; reissue Paris: Karthala, 2000, 236 p.
- Les Antilles françaises, XVIe, XVIIe, XVIIIe siècles (supplément à l'Histoire 4e), Paris-Montréal: Bordas, 1971, 31 p.
- Les Antilles françaises, fin XVIIIe, XIXe, XXe siècles (supplement to Histoire 3e), Point-à-Pitre: Désormaux, 1972, 31 p.; reunited with the previous one and reissued under the title Les Antilles françaises de leur découverte à nos jours, Fort-de-France: Désormeaux, 2001, 63 p.
- Troubles sociaux à la Guadeloupe à la fin du XIXe siècle et au début du XXe siècle, 1895–1910, Pointe-à-Pitre: Cahiers du CERAG No. 31.
- in collaboration with Jean-Paul Hervieu, Volcans et histoire : recueil de textes sur le volcanisme et les éruptions dans l'histoire des Antilles, Pointe-à-Pitre: CERAG, 1976; reprinted in Les volcans dans l'histoire des Antilles, Paris, Karthala, 1997, 229 p.
- Documents d'histoire antillaise et guyanaise, 1819–1914, by the author, 1979, 323 p.
- Delgrès ou la Guadeloupe en 1802, Paris: Karthala, 170 p.
- La grande encyclopédie de la Caraïbe, vol. VI, "Histoire des Antilles", Pointe-à-Pitre: Sanoli, 1990, 207 p.
- La Guadeloupe, les Antilles et la Révolution française -Itineraries, Pointe-à-Pitre, Office régional du patrimoine guadeloupéen, 1991, 156 p.
- La Caraïbe et la Guyane au temps de la Révolution et de l'Empire, 1789–1804, Paris: Karthala, 1992, 222 p.
- in coll. with Alain Yacou, La découverte et la conquête de la Guadeloupe, Paris: Karthala, 1993, 303 p.
- Histoire générale des Antilles et des Guyanes, des Précolombiens à nos jours, Paris: Éd. caribéennes - L'Harmattan, 1994, 329 p.
- Visions de la Caraïbe et des Guyanes : cartes postales anciennes, co-written with Jean Juraver, Gourbeyre : Nestor, 2012 OCLC 844779291.

=== Main works ===
- Historial antillais, vol. 4, Fort-de-France: Société Dajani, 1980, 569 pages.
- Historial antillais, vol. 3, Fort-de-France: Société Dajani, 1981, 569 pages.
- Histoire des communes des Antilles et de la Guyane, Pointe-à-Pitre: Éditions Caraïbes, 1986, 6 volumes of 306 pages.
- Les hommes célèbres de la Caraïbe, dictionnaire, Pointe-à-Pitre: Éditions Caraïbes, 1993, 4 volumes.
