= 2017 Saint Barthélemy Territorial Council election =

Territorial Council elections were held in the French overseas collectivity of Saint Barthélemy on 19 March 2017.

== Results ==
Party	Votes	%	Seats
Saint-Barth d'abord	1,950	53.66	14
Unis pour Saint-Barthélémy	747	20.56	2
Saint-Barth autrement	657	18.08	2
Tous pour Saint-Barth	280	7.71	1
Total	3,634	100.00	19
Valid votes	3,634	98.62	
Invalid/blank votes	51	1.38	
Total votes	3,685	100.00	
Registered voters/turnout	5,478	67.27	
Source: Government of Saint-Barthélemy
