= Gisèle Mophou =

Cameroonian mathematician

Gisèle Massengo Mophou (also published as Gisèle Adélie Mophou Loudjom) is a Cameroonian applied mathematician and numerical analyst whose research involves control theory and fractional differential equations. She is a professor at the University of the French Antilles in Pointe-à-Pitre, Guadeloupe, where she directs the Laboratoire de Mathématiques Informatique et Applications (LAMIA).

== Education and career ==
Mophou is originally from Cameroon. She earned a bachelor's degree in 1987, and a diplôme d'études approfondies in numerical analysis in 1997 at Pierre and Marie Curie University in France. She completed her PhD in numerical analysis in 2000, at the University of the French Antilles.

She obtained a habilitation in 2010, and became a full professor at the University of the French Antilles in 2013. From 2017 to 2019 she returned to Cameroon, with the support of the Alexander von Humboldt Foundation, as German Research Chair at the African Institute for Mathematical Sciences Cameroon.

== Recognition ==
Mophou was elected to the African Academy of Sciences in 2013.
