= Sabine Andrivon-Milton =

French military historian (born 1970)

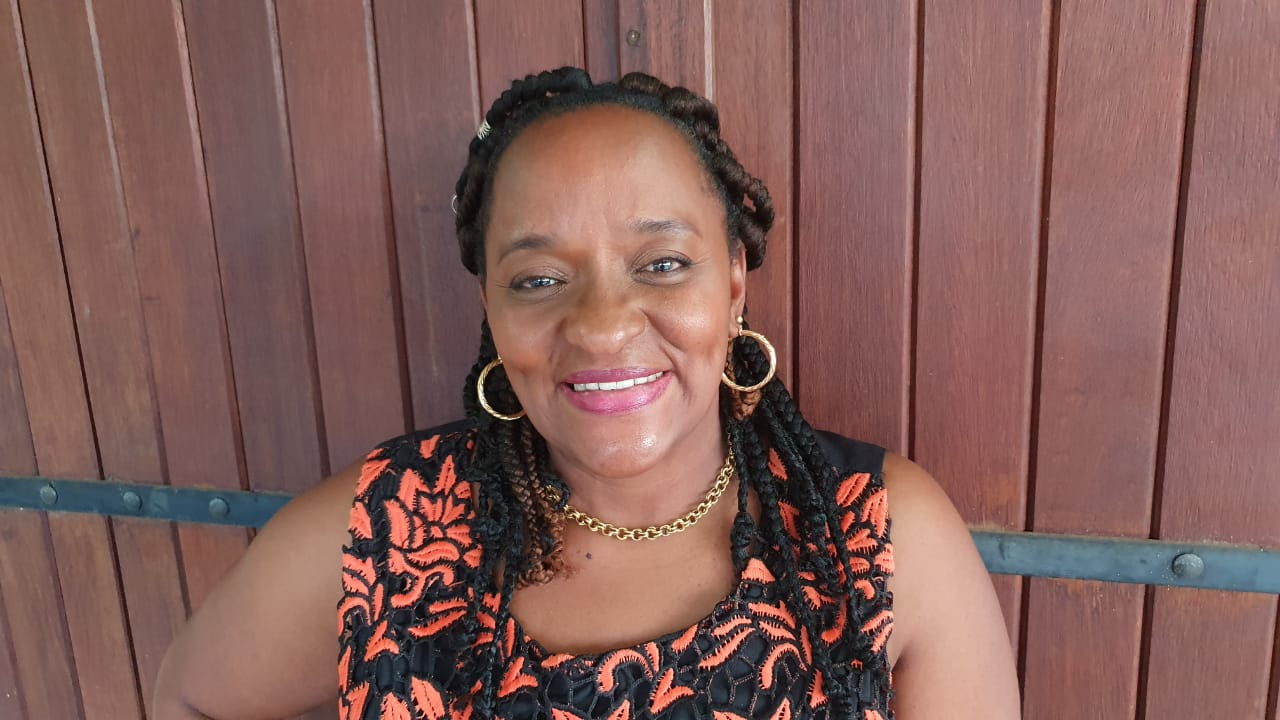
- Born: February 22, 1970; Fort-de-France, Martinique
- Citizenship: France
- Awards: Chevalier de l'ordre national du Mérite; Chevalier de la Légion d'honneur

Academic work
- Discipline: Historian
- Sub-discipline: Naval history, Military history
- Notable works: La Martinique pendant la Grande Guerre

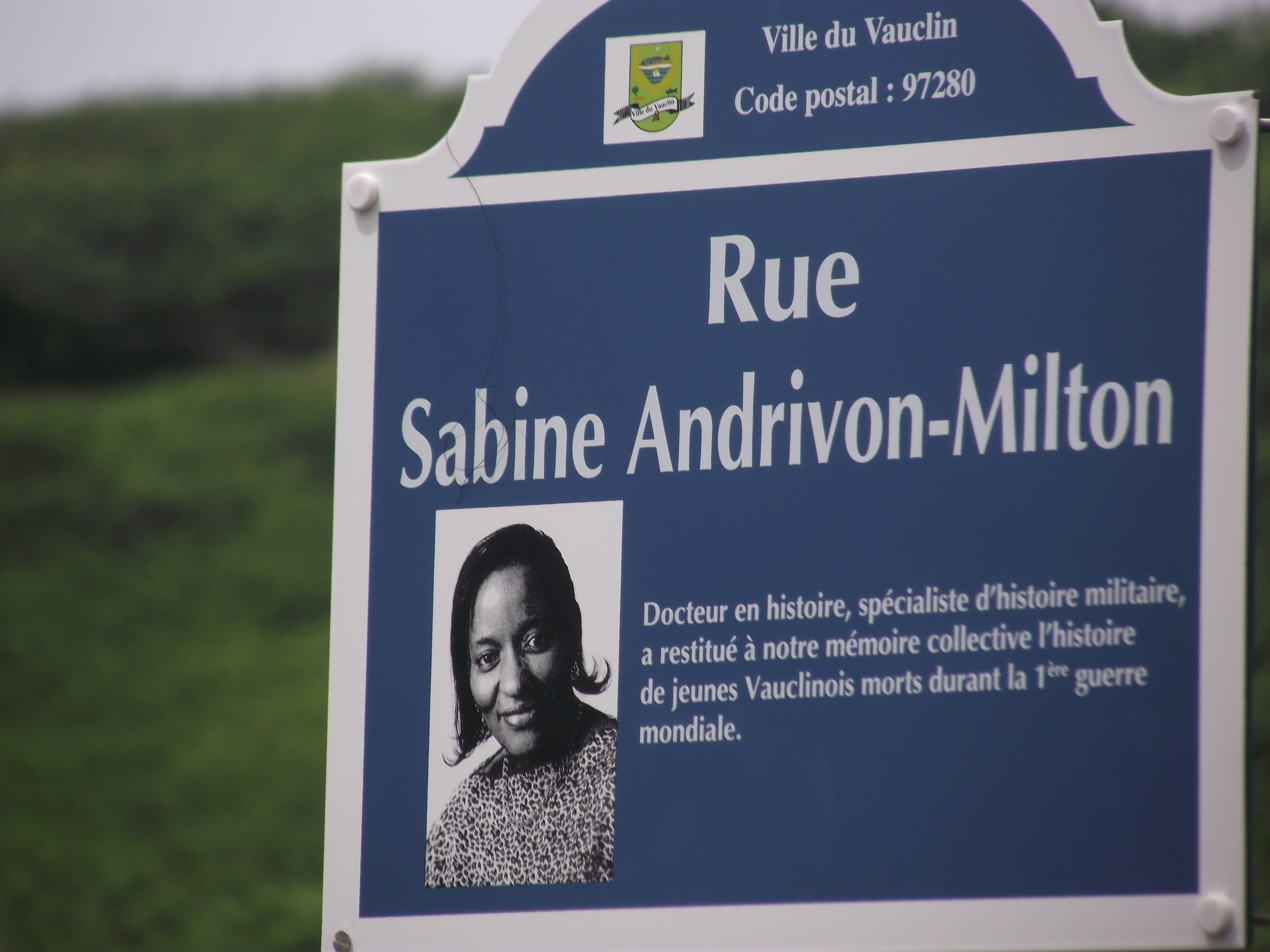
In June 2013, a street in Vauclin (Pointe Athanase) was named rue Sabine Andrivon-Milton.

Sabine Andrivon-Milton, (born 22 February 1970) is a French historian specialising in the military history of Martinique, a teacher, author and board game designer.

== Biography ==
=== Education ===
She went to Sainte-Thérèse B primary school, collège de Sainte-Thérèse, completing her baccalaureate at the lycée de Bellevue.

She studied at the University of the French Antilles in Schœlcher in Martinique and at Paris 1 Panthéon-Sorbonne University. She defended her doctoral thesis, entitled La Martinique et la Grande Guerre in December 2003 and has specialised in military history.

=== Historical and commemorative work ===
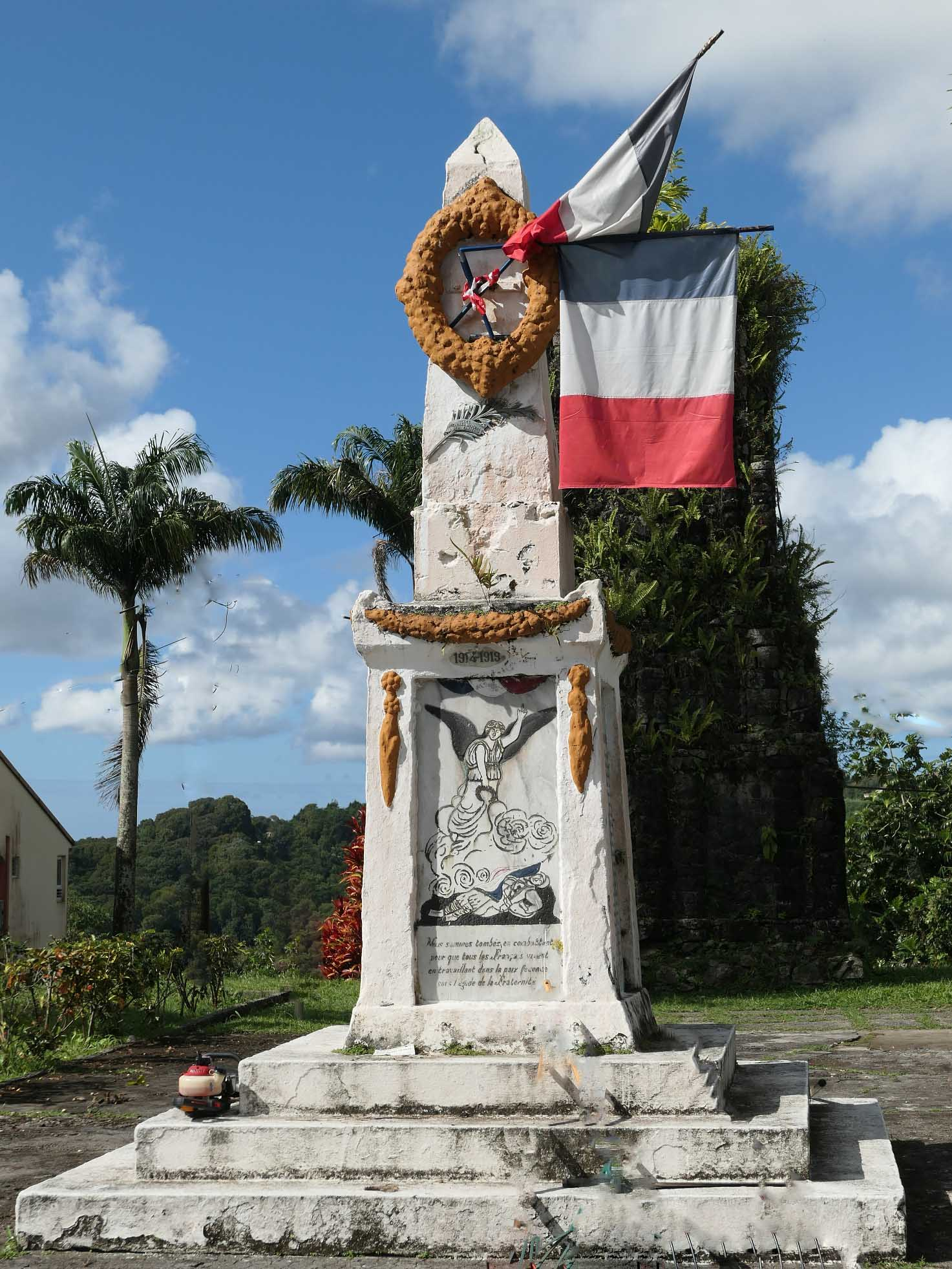
First world war memorial in Saint Joseph, Martinique

President of the Association Histoire Militaire de la Martinique, she is the driving force behind the inclusion of forgotten soldiers' names on war memorials, and the importance of popularising knowledge of Martinique's war history: she discovered nearly 150 names of Martinique soldiers who died during the First World War and who had been awarded the distinction "Mort pour la France" (died for France) were not inscribed on war memorials. Several municipalities in Martinique have agreed to add names: Vauclin, Saint-Joseph, Basse-Pointe, Ajoupa-Bouillon, Sainte-Marie, Trinité, Fort-de-France, Marigot, Fonds-Saint-Denis, Gros-Morne.

She also campaigned for war memorials to be erected in communes that didn't have one, including Sainte-Luce, Saint-Pierre and Rivière-Pilote. Through the Association Histoire Militaire de la Martinique, she organised the "Monuments aux morts en lumières" event, marking the commemoration of the Armistice of 11 November 1918 by illuminating war memorials during the week of the anniversary.

The Ministry of Overseas France in Paris was the venue for a conference she held on the former French colonies and the Great War, bringing together specialists from Guadeloupe (Ary Broussillon), Reunion (Rachel Mnémosyme), New Caledonia (Sylvette Boyer represented by Sarah Mohammed) and French Guiana (Virginie Brunelot). On 8 November 2011, this conference moved to Martinique, taking place at Fort Desaix.

==== First World War centenary ====
As part of the commemoration of the First World War centenary, she spoke about martiniquais women's part in the French war effort from research into correspondence and local reporting in Les femmes martiniquaises dans la guerre (Martinique women in the war) at the symposium La Caraïbe et la Première Guerre mondiale (The Caribbean and the First World War), organised by the Archives départementales de la Guadeloupe and the Société d'histoire de la Guadeloupe. On 8 July, she took part in a round table discussion at the Senate, presenting a paper entitled Les soldats antillo-guyanais dans la Grande Guerre. In it she described initial conscription and volunteers, their privations, the battles they fought in and the number lost, naming two men in particular, the aviators Jean-Marie Guibert and Pierre Réjon.

She later organised La Martinique et sa filleule Étain (Martinique and her godchild Étain); an event which received the Label Centenaire and appeared in the official national programme. A delegation of 94 Martiniquais people visited Étain, Meuse, a town destroyed during the Great War and reconstructed using funds contributed to by Martinique. 54 young people from the colleges of Terreville and Vauclin and the Robert LPA, accompanied by their teachers, veterans and friends, attended the commemoration of the beginning of the battle of Verdun on 21 February in the Bois des Caures, the signing of the twinning agreement between Étain and Vauclin, and ceremonies to honour Martinique's soldiers.

=== Educator and public historian ===
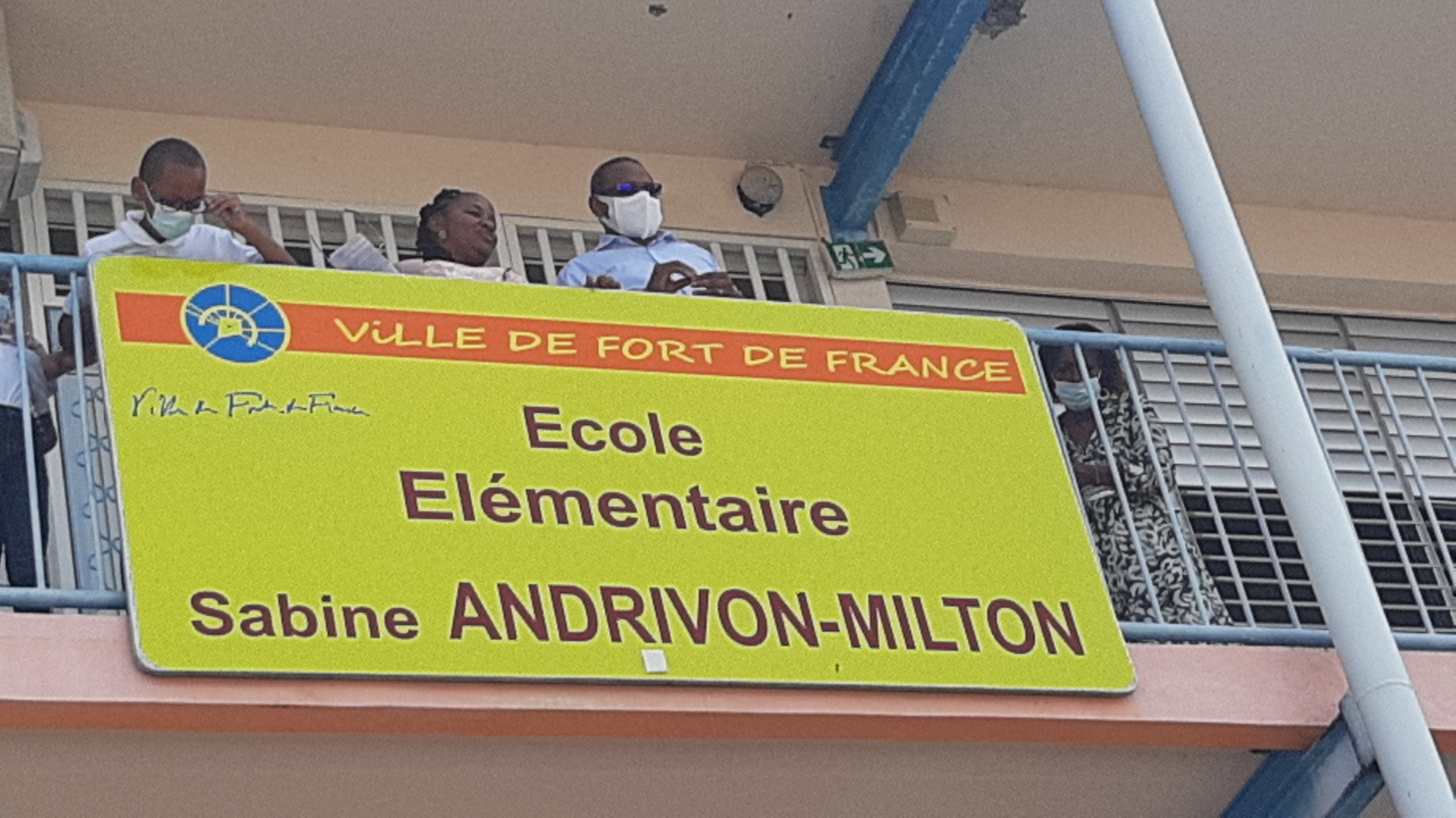
Elementary school Sabine Andrivon-Milton

Andrivon-Milton is committed to teaching of history from a young age - in October 2017, she devised a 9-card family game, Je découvre la Martinique then in 2018, the board game La Martinique au bout des doigts. Other educational games have followed, including "la Martinique en jeux de société", "la Martinique en jeux de société", "la Martinique en multijeux" and Martinik Mémory.

A well-known historian in Martinique, she gives numerous talks in schools, associations and other organisations to explain the role of Martinique and the Martiniquais in the Great War. She hosts a programme called Une île une histoire (An island, a history) on Martinique première radio.

On 19 March 2021, Sainte-Thérèse B Elementary School in Fort-de-France became the Sabine ANDRIVON-MILTON Elementary School.

== Television ==
She has produced a number of history programmes broadcast on Martinique Première:

- November 2013 : Propos de guerre
- November 2014 : Lettres de poilus martiniquais
- November 2015 : Des soldats martiniquais de la Grande Guerre
- She has featured in several documentaries:
- Jean Jules Joseph, un soldat créole, David Hunger et Daniel Picouly, 2014
- On a retrouvé le soldat Borical, Barcha Bauer, La Lanterne, 2013
- Gwadloup en Argonne, Fred Foret, 2011.
- Antilles, la guerre oubliée by Frédéric Monteil, 2019
- Martinique, à jamais dans nos cœurs, by Jil Servan, Palaviré production, France O, December 2021

A programme was dedicated to her on "Ziétaj" a cultural review programme on Martinique Première, November 2021

== Offices and memberships ==
- President of the association "Histoire Militaire de la Martinique".
- Member of the commission mémoire et solidarité du conseil départemental des anciens combattants.
- Member of the Comité départemental du Centenaire 14–18.
- President of the association Martinique-Étain Member of the commission mémorielle de la ville de Schoelcher
- Member of commission mémoires et transmissions de la ville de Fort-de-France
- Commander in the Réserve citoyenne.

== Publications ==
- La Martinique, base navale dans le rêve mexicain de Napoléon III (1862-1867). SAM éditions (November 1996)
- La Martinique et la Grande Guerre, Éditions L'Harmattan (November 2005)
- Le livre d'or des soldats martiniquais morts pendant la Grande Guerre. SAM éditions (November 2006)
- Lettres de Poilus martiniquais. SAM éditions (November 2008)
- La Martinique pendant la Grande Guerre, recueil de poèmes et de chants. SAM éditions (November 2009)
- Anatole dans la tourmente du Morne Siphon, L'Harmattan, (July 2010)
- La Martinique en 200 questions-réponses, Orphie (October 2011)
- Belle la Martinique vue du ciel, Orphie (text and captions)
- Le Fort Desaix et le 33e RIMa, une histoire de marsouins aux Antilles (novembre 2012), contribution
- Fort-de-France en 200 questions-réponses. Orphie (July 2014)
- Quizz, la Grande Guerre, les Antilles et la Guyane. SAM éditions (July 2014)
- La Martinique et la Première Guerre mondiale en 100 questions-réponses. Orphie (July 2016). Label Centenaire.
- Les histoires de Sabine, volume 1 (SAM éditions, April 2019)
- La Martinique en multijeux. SAM éditions (August 2019)
- "Les histoires de Sabine", volume 2 SAM éditions (May 2021)
- "La Martinique en multijeux", volume 2 SAM éditions (July 2021)

== Honours ==
- Chevalier de l'ordre national du Mérite
- Médaille de bronze du service militaire volontaire
- Médaille de bronze du Souvenir Français
- Chevalière de la Légion d'honneur
- Médaille de bronze de l'ONAC (Office Nationale des Anciens Combattants)
