= Magrs =

Magrs is a surname. Notable people with the surname include:

- Paul Magrs (born 1969), English writer

== See also ==
- Magras
