= 2020 District 5 (Nevis) by-election =

2020 Nevis by-election

2020 District 5 by-election
- 5 March 2020

District 5 (Saint Thomas' Parish)
- Turnout: 46.3%
	First party	Second party
Candidate	Cleone Stapleton-Simmonds	Keith Scarborough
Party	NRP	CCM
Popular vote	514	191
Percentage	72.9%	27.1%
Swing	▲3.6%	▼3.6%
Member of Parliament before election
Joseph Parry
NRP
Elected Member of Parliament
Cleone Stapleton-Simmonds
NRP

A by-election was held on 5 March 2020 for District 5, a constituency of the Nevis Island Assembly, following the resignation of its representative, Joseph Parry. The election was won by Cleone Stapleton-Simmonds, who retained the seat for the Nevis Reformation Party (NRP).

== Background ==
In December 2019, Joseph Parry, former Premier of Nevis and ex-leader of the Nevis Reformation Party, announced his retirement from politics and resignation as a member of the Nevis Island Assembly which then vacated his seat, District 5 (commonly known as Nevis 5), which comprises the parish of Saint Thomas' on Nevis. District 5 is considered a safe seat for the NRP, and was the only seat to have voted NRP in the previous 2017 Nevis Island Assembly election. In the 2017 election, Parry had won with 518 votes (or 69.3%) while the Concerned Citizens’ Movement (CCM) candidate Keith Scarborough had come second with 229 votes (or 30.7%).

== Candidates ==
Cleone Stapleton-Simmonds stood for the NRP, while the CCM put forward Keith Scarborough as their candidate.

== Result ==
2020 District 5 by-election
Party	Candidate	Votes	%	±%
NRP	Cleone Stapleton-Simmonds	514	72.9%	▲3.6%
CCM	Keith Scarborough	191	27.1%	▼3.6%
Rejected ballots		8		
Majority		323	45.8%	▲7.2%
Turnout		713	46.3%	
Registered electors		1,539		
NRP hold		Swing		

== Aftermath ==
Following Stapleton-Simmonds' election as the member for District 5, she became the first woman to be elected as a parliamentary representative for the Nevis Reformation Party. Due to the Covid-19 pandemic, an emergency sitting was required in April to swear her in as a member of the assembly.
