= Alexis Jeffers =

Saint Kitts and Nevis politician

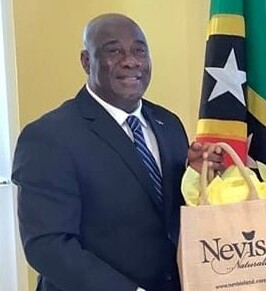
Jeffers in 2022

Alexis Zook Jeffers (born 25 November 1968) is a Saint Kitts and Nevis politician with the Concerned Citizens' Movement. He has represented the Nevis #11 constituency in the National Assembly since 2020, and was formerly a representative for the Saint James constituency in the Nevis Island Assembly from 2011 until 2022. From 2017 until 2022, Jeffers served as Deputy Premier of Nevis and a Minister in the Nevis Island Administration.

== Career ==
Before entering politics, Jeffers worked in a car rental company and founded a swimming pool cleaning company.

In late 2009, Jeffers announced that he would stand for election to represent Nevis #11 District in the January 2010 general election. At the time, he held dual citizenship of Saint Kitts and Nevis and the United States. Under Article 28 of Saint Kitts and Nevis' 1983 constitution, a person is not qualified for election to the National Assembly "if he is, by virtue of his own act, under any acknowledgement of allegiance, obedience or adherence to a foreign power or state". However, whether dual citizens could be nominated was a matter of debate until the passage of the National Assembly Elections Act (2009), which required all candidates for elections to swear at the time of their nomination that they lacked citizenship in any other country. As Saint Kitts and Nevis did not have a United States embassy, Jeffers had to go to Barbados to renounce U.S. citizenship. His renunciation was confirmed by a notice in the U.S.' Federal Register in February 2010. However, he lost the election to Patrice Nisbett of the Nevis Reformation Party, who would go on to become Attorney-General and Minister of Justice and Legal Affairs.

Though he lost to Nisbett in the federal election, Jeffers had more success in Nevis Island elections, beating Nesbitt by 37 votes to win the Saint James seat in the Nevis Island Assembly in July 2011. During his second term there, Jeffers spoke out a number of times against alleged irregularities in the elections process. In the first sitting of the new term of the Nevis Island Assembly in October, Jeffers and his fellow CCM members staged a walkout, boycotting parliamentary business for that day. In June 2012, he called for Saint James Registration Officer Clayton Mills to step down, accusing him of political bias with regards to his handling of 108 voters on the electoral rolls in the district, whom the CCM claimed to be wrongfully registered. He also spoke out against fuel surcharges.

Jeffers faced off against Nisbett again in Nevis Island elections in 2013. In his campaign, he attacked Nisbett for the many roles he was playing in government, stating that "no man can serve two masters" and urging him to step down from his position as Attorney-General if he wanted to contest the election. He was re-elected at the 2017 election, and shortly after the election was appointed to be Nevis' Deputy Premier and Minister of Agriculture, Lands, Housing, Cooperatives and Fisheries, Natural Resources and Disaster Management. In the 2022 election, he lost his seat to NRP leader Janice Daniel-Hodge.

He was first elected as a federal Member of Parliament in the 2020 election for the Nevis #11 constituency, and was re-elected at the 2022 election. In 2023, he was made a special advisor to Premier Mark Brantley.

== Personal life ==
Jeffers did his early education in Nevis at the St James Primary School, Gingerland Secondary School, and Charlestown Secondary School Sixth Form College. He went on to the United States for tertiary education, where he attended Broward College and then Florida Atlantic University.
