= Georges Voisset =

French literary critic and translator

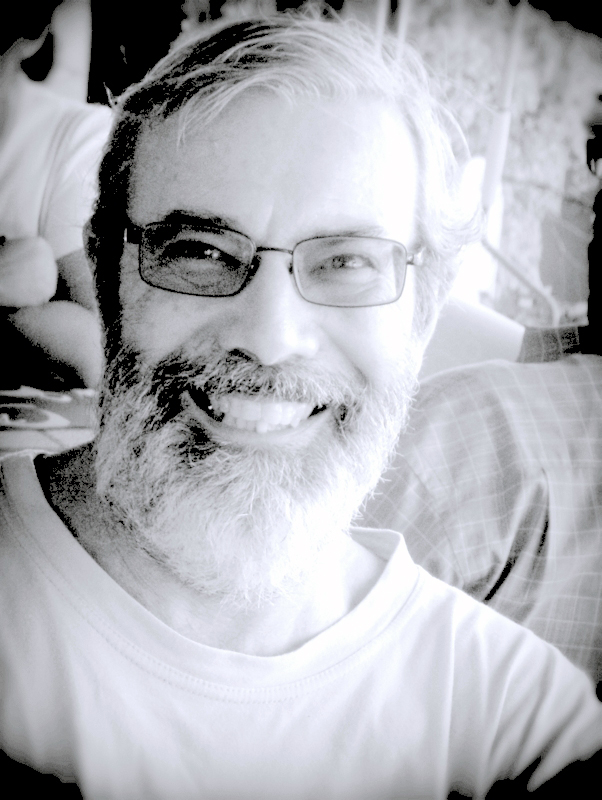
Voisset in 2012

Georges Voisset (born March 15, 1948, in Lyon, France) is an Agrégé in French Literature, former Fellow of the Ecole Normale Supérieure of Paris and Professor of Comparative Literature at the University of the French West Indies and Guyane. Literary critic and translator, he is the author of more than a dozen books and numerous articles and essays. He has travelled widely and lived in several Asian and African countries as a university lecturer and director of French cultural institutes under the French Foreign Service (Singapore, Japan, Indonesia, Mauritania, Ivory Coast).

== Career ==
While serving as a lecturer in French at the University of Singapore, he developed an interest in the literature and poetry of the Southeast Asian Archipelago. His work has since focused on fostering cultural and literary links between Francophone regions and the Malay / Indonesian world (Indonesia, Malaysia, Brunei, Singapore and the southern province of Patani in Thailand). He has argued that the Malay language sphere has historically received less attention within the French literary community than the Caribbean and ‘West Indies’.

These problematics are illustrated in his book Les Lèvres du Monde (The Lips of the World, 2011), which presents diverse thematics and scores of names of writers from this part of the world, starting from the Malay version of the Story of Alexander the Great to contemporary Cambodian cinema; from Derek Walcott to Multatuli via Henri Fauconnier and Pramoedya Ananta Toer; from Senghor to the Indonesians Sitor Situmorang and Ayu Utami or the Singaporean poet Edwin Thumboo; from Victor Segalen to Jean Rhys via Joseph Conrad; from Césaire and Edouard Glissant to the Malaysian poet Muhammad Haji Salleh, etc. Exploring an immense intercultural space little known to the Western public, he highlights in thirty over essays the unsuspected wealth of numerous relations between literary “archipelagoes” apparently remote.

Since long familiar with these literatures, he has translated and commented on poetry, both modern and traditional, as can be seen in his Anthology of some sixty modern poets La Terre et l’Eau (Land and Water) and above all Sonorités pour adoucir le souci (Rhymes to Soothe Care). Due to this work, a too often neglected poetical world has entered the prestigious UNESCO collection of the World Representative Works.

His interest and work on the pantun have made him one of the few French specialists of this genre, as illustrated by his Histoire du Genre Pantoun (History of the Pantun Genre, 1998) and several translations and new translations : Pantouns malais (Malay Pantun, 1993), Pantouns malais (2009), Le Chant à quatre mains (The Four-Hand Singing — Pantun and other Love Poems, 2011). His latest book is a compilation of Jungle Tales (Contes Sauvages – Les très curieuses histoires de Kancil le petit chevrotain, 2012), an adaptation of a few of the well-known folkloric animal tales on Kancil or Pelanduk the Mouse-deer published in Singapore at the turn of the 20th Century.

== A History of the Pantun genre ==
The Malay pantun is a poetical expression of orality which can be formalized as a quatrain of four lines which cross rhyme (ABAB), where the first two lines introduce a general analogical atmosphere while the last two convey the meaning of the poem, which can be moral, sentimental, etc. Georges Voisset explains and illustrates in his book the filiation from the Malay pantun to the pantoum "à la française" and its internationalization, after this form was revealed to Victor Hugo by a young romantic orientalist, Ernest Fouinet. Hugo was the first, in France, to quote a linked pantun in a famous note of his collection The Orientals (1829). It is first of all due to the success of this work, and to a misprint (pantoum for pantoun), that the pantoum owes its individualization in French poetics. But it is Leconte de Lisle who first wrote a really valuable series of linked pantun; after him, the international literary movement of the Parnasse would spread to the entire francophone area. The names of Théophile Gautier, Théodore de Banville, Charles Asselineau and his friend Baudelaire, Verlaine, Jules Laforgue, René Ghil, should be mentioned, but also the Vietnamese poet Nguyen Van Xiem, etc. Georges Voisset then quotes, beyond Francophonie, numerous other poets who practiced the linked pantun, many from other sources than Hugo’s, such as Chamisso the Franco-German poet, the Russian Karolina Pavlova, the Czech and Nobel Prize winner Jaroslav Seifert, etc. Georges Voisset ends his book by questioning the total lack of interest shown for the genuine Malay form in the French-speaking world, with the exception of a handful of poets, whereas the Japanese haiku has received an overwhelming success. A regrettable state of affairs, according to Georges Voisset who has endeavoured to reveal in his translations and works the infinite beauty of the pantun genre.

== Works ==
=== Essays ===
- Histoire du genre pantoun. Malayophonie, Francophonie, Universalie, L’Harmattan, 1997.
- L’imaginaire de l’archipel, Karthala, 2003 (Collections Lettres du Sud).
- Les Lèvres du monde. Littératures comparées, de la Caraïbe à l’Archipel malais, Les Perséides, 2008 (Collection Le monde atlantique).
- Guide de littérature mauritanienne : une anthologie méthodique, collaboration work, L'Harmattan, 1992.

==== Other essays ====
- Pantoun et Pantoum, Cahiers du Centre International d'Etudes Poétiques, 218, Bruxelles, 1998 (On the "French Pantoum" in Belgium).
- Le pantoun malais aujourd'hui, in Poésie 96, n° 64, décembre 1996 (Contemporary Pantun from Malaysian Poets).

=== Translations ===
- Pantouns malais, La Différence, 1993 (Collection Orphée).
- Sonorités pour adoucir le souci : poésie traditionnelle de l'Archipel malais, Gallimard / UNESCO, 1996 (Collection Connaissance de l'Orient, Oeuvres représentatives).
- Le Livre des charmes — Incantations malaises du temps passé, La Différence, 1997 (Collection Orphée).
- La Terre et l’Eau — Un siècle de poésie de l’Archipel malais (1913-1996). Anthologie bilingue : Indonésie, Malaisie, Singapour, Brunei, You Feng Éditeur, 1999.
- Pantouns malais, Les Perséides, 2008 (Collection ArtBref).
- Le Chant à quatre mains — Pantouns et autres poèmes d’amour, Collection du Banian, 2010.
- Contes Sauvages — Les très curieuses histoires de Kancil le petit chevrotain, Les Perséides, 2012.
- Semangat — La Force Vive de la poésie malaise. Charmes traditionnels et poèmes contemporains », in Poésie 97, n° 66, Feb. 1997 (on mantras).
- Poètes malais d'aujourd'hui, présentés et traduits du malais, Poésie 97, n° 70, Dec. 1997 (contemporary Malay poets).
- La poésie indonésienne, Europe n° 846, Oct. 1999. (Indonesian Contemporary Poets)
- Chairil Anwar : poèmes, in Orpheus, Revue internationale de poésie n° 2.
