= Lumina Sophie =

Lumina Sophie, called "Surprise", nickname of Marie-Philomène Roptus (November 5, 1848 — September 15, 1879) was an instigator of the 1870 revolt on the island of Martinique, a French overseas department. She organized a group of insurgent women, the pétroleuses, who burned plantations and called on citizens to face local authority to free an unjustly convicted black sailor.

== Early life ==
Lumina was born in 1848, the year slavery was abolished in Martinique, in Rivière-Pilote, a small island town, daughter of a former enslaved woman, recently liberated by abolition, Marie-Sophie, known as Zulma. At a time when slaves were illiterate, Lumina had access to education and literature, reading newspapers and becoming interested in French politics on the island. She was registered under the name of Marie-Philomène Sophie. Later, the administration would give the mother and daughter the surname of Roptus. Thus, Marie-Philomène Sophie became Marie-Philomène Roptus, but everyone calls her Lumina (diminutive of Philomène) Sophie (of her mother's name).

According to the records, her mother was already the head of the family when Lumina was only 6 years old. Her family is basically composed by women like grandmother, aunts, cousins and nieces. They lived in a lease where they grew bananas, cocoa and coffee, where men worked in the fields and women took care of the household, children, sewing and cooking.

With the death of the grandmother, the family scattered. Installed in another lease, Lumina helped the mother in the harvest, learned to sew, went with her to the market, and proved quite precocious for politics. While working on crops, she saw the precarious way of life of most workers In 1870, Lumina was 21 years old and was already an independent, strong-willed young girl, often seen in the village markets and the town of Rivière Pilote. Around this time, she met Emile Sidney, the son of a liberated family before slavery, which keeps her informed about the daily lives of the rural population, abusive taxes, contempt and lack of access to education.

== The revolt ==
In 1870, Leopold Lubin, a black sailor, a member of a family of bricklayers, had a violent argument with Augier Maintenon, a young European, assistant commissar of the French Navy and chief of the town's naval service. The case was brought to court and Leopold was convicted of libel and assault, which the population soon saw as a case involving racism. In solidarity, a movement led by Lumina rises, where she petitions and raises money to pay the costs of Leopold's defense. Racist provocations are made by members of the local trade, including one of them who was in Leopold's jury and is proud to have condemned him.

This was not the first case of injustices perpetrated by the island's justice system. White flags (a nostalgic symbol of royalty and white supremacy) were hoisted in the streets in provocation and a farmer accused of raping an ex-slave and abandoning his body was convicted with only a fine. Angered by the constant provocations, the rural workers are organized around Lumina.

In September 1870, in Rivière Pilote's market, Lumina met with the other demonstrators, shouting for the liberation of Lubin. On September 22, the population of southern Martinique and especially that of Rivière Pilote exploded in revolt with Lumina as one of the insurgents. She was in her second month of pregnancy and marched toward the public jail with the crowd behind her. In the ensuing chaos, Emile and several other men of the movement disappeared or were found dead. Lumina took the fight but the revolt was quickly defeated; she was captured on September 26, 1870 and sent to Fort Desaix.

== Prison and death ==
Several charges of insurrection and revolt were made against Lumina, whom the governor of Martinique called "the fiercest, the most fearsome of the hooligan gang leaders." Her first trial was from March 17 to April 17, 1871. She is presented as a woman seeking to "dominate men." The governor identifies her as the "flame of revolt" and she was sentenced to life imprisonment in Saint-Laurent-du-Maroni, French Guiana. Her judgment was not fair, for it was all done in French, and she spoke only Creole. His son, Théodore Lumina, was born in prison and was separated from his mother at birth, dying about seven months later. In 1877, Lumina was forced to marry a former prisoner and farmer from French Guiana, 14 years her senior, and Lumina died two years later from illness and ill-treatment, in September 15, 1879.

== Legacy ==
In 2005, the French playwright Suzanne Dracius wrote a play staged in France and in its territories on the life of Lumina and its history has been remembered by local artists. A high school in Martinique was named after her. In 2008, a biography written by Gilbert Pago collected facts and dates about her life and struggle.

== See also ==
- Haitian Revolution
