= 2022 Saint Barthélemy Territorial Council election =

Territorial Council elections were held in the French overseas collectivity of Saint Barthélemy on 20 March 2022.

== Results ==
2022 Saint-Barthélemy Territorial Council election preliminary results
List	Lead candidate	First round		Second round		Seats	+/−
List	Lead candidate	Votes	%	Votes	%	Seats	+/−
Saint-Barth d'abord	Romaric Magras	1,625	46,15	1,905	49,16	6	−8
Saint-Barth Action-Équilibre	Hélène Bernier	953	27,07	1,970	50,86	13	+9
Unis pour Saint-Barthélémy	Xavier Lédée	943	26,78	1,970	50,86	13	+9
Valid votes		3,521	98,10	3,875	98,65		
Blank or null votes		68	1,90	53	1,35		
Total		3,589	100,00	3,928	100,00	19	
Abstention		1,726	32,47	1,388	26,17		
Turnout		5,315	67,53	5,316	73,83		
