= 2022 Fukushima gubernatorial election =

Election for a governor in Japan

- October 30, 2022
- Turnout: 42.58% (▼2.46pp)
Candidate	Masao Uchibori	Yoshiaki Kusano
Party	Independent	Independent
Popular vote	576,221	77,196
Percentage	88.19%	11.81%
Governor before election
Masao Uchibori
Independent
Elected Governor
Masao Uchibori
Independent

The 2022 Fukushima gubernatorial election was held on 30 October 2022 to elect the Governor of Fukushima Prefecture. Incumbent Masao Uchibori was re-elected for another term.

== Candidates ==
All candidates were independents, although received support from established political parties.

- Yoshiaki Kusano (endorsed by JCP)
- ~~Sho Takahashi~~
- Masao Uchibori (incumbent; endorsed by LDP, Komeito, CDP, DPFP)

== Results ==
Candidate	Votes	%
Masao Uchibori	576,221	88.19
Yoshiaki Kusano	77,196	11.81
Total valid votes	653,417	100.00
Electorate	1,548,260	42.58
