= Suzanne Dracius =

French writer and university professor (born 1951)

- Born: August 25, 1951 (age 75); Fort-de-France, Martinique
- Education: Sorbonne
- Occupations: Author, professor, playwright
- Website: www.suzannedracius.com

Suzanne Dracius (born August 25, 1951 in Fort-de-France, in the Terres-Sainville district) is a French writer from Martinique.

== Biography ==
After studying at the Lycée Marie-Curie in Sceaux and at the Sorbonne, Suzanne Dracius taught in Paris, then at the University of the French Antilles and in the United States as a visiting professor at the University of Georgia and the University of Ohio.

Suzanne Dracius defines herself as a Kalazaza, a creole word meaning a light skinned mixed race person; she claims African, European, Indian, Caribbean and Chinese ancestry. She has made the fight against any kind of racial, sexual or social discrimination the issue and the subject of her writing. Her books L’Autre qui danse and Rue Monte au Ciel have been translated into English as Climb to the Sky and The dancing other, and Italian; also an anthology of poetry, Calazaza's delicious dereliction : poems.

== Work ==
=== Novels ===
- L’Autre qui danse, Seghers, 1989; reissued by Editions du Rocher, 2007
- Rue Monte au ciel, Desnel, 2003

=== Short stories ===
- De sueur, de sucre et de sang, collection of short stories, Le Serpent à Plumes, No. 15), 1992; reprinted in pocket format, 1995.
- La Virago, in Diversité: La Nouvelle Francophone, Houghton-Mifflin, 1995, p. 70-81
- Montagne de feu, in Diversité: La Nouvelle Francophone, Houghton-Mifflin, 2000, second edition, pp. 64–76
- La Langue de Molière sauce chien, short story, in Les Identités francophones, anthologie didactique under the direction of Aurélien Boivin et de Bruno Dufour, ed. Les Publications Québec français, Québec, 2008, p. 86–92

=== Poetry ===
- Negzagonal and Moun le Sid (Creole and French versions), Éditions de Traditions et Parlers populaires de Wallonie-Bruxelles, MicRomania (coll.) No. 3, 1992; No. 5, 1993
- Hurricane, cris d’Insulaires (collective) Desnel, 2005
- Prosopopées urbaines (collective, coordinated by), Desnel, 2006
- Exquise déréliction métisse, Desnel, 2008
- Pour Haïti (collective, coordinated by), Desnel, 2010
- Déictique féminitude insulaire, Idem, 2014
- Scripta manent, éditions Idem, 2016

=== Plays ===
- Lumina Sophie dite Surprise, fabulodrama, Desnel, 2005; first performed at the prefecture of Fort-de-France in 2000, then the Festival du Marin (2002), revived under the patronage of TV5 at the opening ceremony of the AATF symposium (Association of American Teachers of French) in a production by the author (Trois-Îlets, 2003)

=== Essays, children's and youth literature and fine books ===
- Habitation Anse Latouche, la Vallée des Papillons (with Pierre Pinalie), ed. Hugues Hayot, 1994
- Fables de La Fontaine avec adaptations créoles et sources antiques (illustrations by Choko), Desnel, 2006
- My Little Book of London / Mon petit livre de Londres (bilingual text), Desnel, 2008
- DOM : Départements à part entière ou entièrement à part ?, International Journal of Francophone Studies Volume 11 Numbers 1 and 2, edited by Adlai Murdoch (UIUC) and Jane Kuntz (UIUC), 2008 (p. 229–238), ed. Intellect Ltd., Bristol, UK
- La Crise de l’Outre-Mer français (collective), L’Harmattan, 2009
- In Search of Suzanne Césaire's Garden », in Research in African Literatures, vol. 41, No 1 (Spring 2010), Indiana University Press, The Ohio State University (p. 155–165)

== Awards and literary prizes ==
- 1989 : L'Autre qui danse finalist for the Prix du Premier Roman.
- 2003 : Awarded honorary membership of the AATF
- 2003 : Rue Monte au ciel was given the "Coup de cœur" awarded by FNAC.
- 2004 : Awarded honorary membership of the Foreign Language Honor Society of Ohio University.
- 2005 : Prix Littéraire Fetkann / Mémoire du Sud, mémoire de l’humanité for Hurricane, cris d’Insulaires.
- 8 March 2006 (International Women's Day): Médaille d’honneur de Schœlcher for Lumina Sophie dite Surprise.
- 2009 : Prix Littéraire Fetkann for Exquise déréliction métisse.
- 2010 : Prix de la Société des Poètes Français in recognition of her life's work.
- 2019 : Prix européen francophone Virgile Léopold Sédar Senghor.
