= Cleone Stapleton-Simmonds =

Member of the Nevis Island Assembly
- Incumbent
- Assumed office 18 April 2020
- Preceded by: Joseph Parry
- Constituency: District 5/Saint Thomas' Parish

Personal details
- Party: Nevis Reformation Party (until 2023); Independent (from 2023)

Cleone Stapleton-Simmonds is a Nevisian attorney and politician serving as a member of the Nevis Island Assembly, representing District 5/the Saint Thomas' parish.

== Political career ==
Stapleton-Simmonds was first elected in March 2020 to the Nevis Island Assembly in a by-election for District 5/St Thomas’ Parish as a member of the Nevis Reformation Party (NRP), following the retirement of the incumbent NRP representative Joseph Parry. Following this result, she became the first woman elected as a parliamentary representative of the NRP. In September 2020, Stapleton-Simmonds unsuccessfully stood to be leader of the NRP, losing to Janice Daniel-Hodge. However, she was announced as Deputy Leader of the party.

Stapleton-Simmonds was re-elected as the representative of District 5 at the 2022 election, becoming one of two elected NRP members sitting in Opposition in the Assembly, with NRP leader Janice Daniel-Hodge being elected to District 4. In February 2023, she was suspended from the NRP and in May was formally removed from the party following reported disagreements between her and party leader Janice Daniel-Hodge over the process of appointing a senator and a Leader of the Opposition. Stapleton-Simmonds currently sits as an independent representative in the Nevis Island Assembly.
