= 2022 Nagano gubernatorial election =

Japanese gubernatorial election

- 7 August 2022
- Turnout: 40.94% ▼2.34%
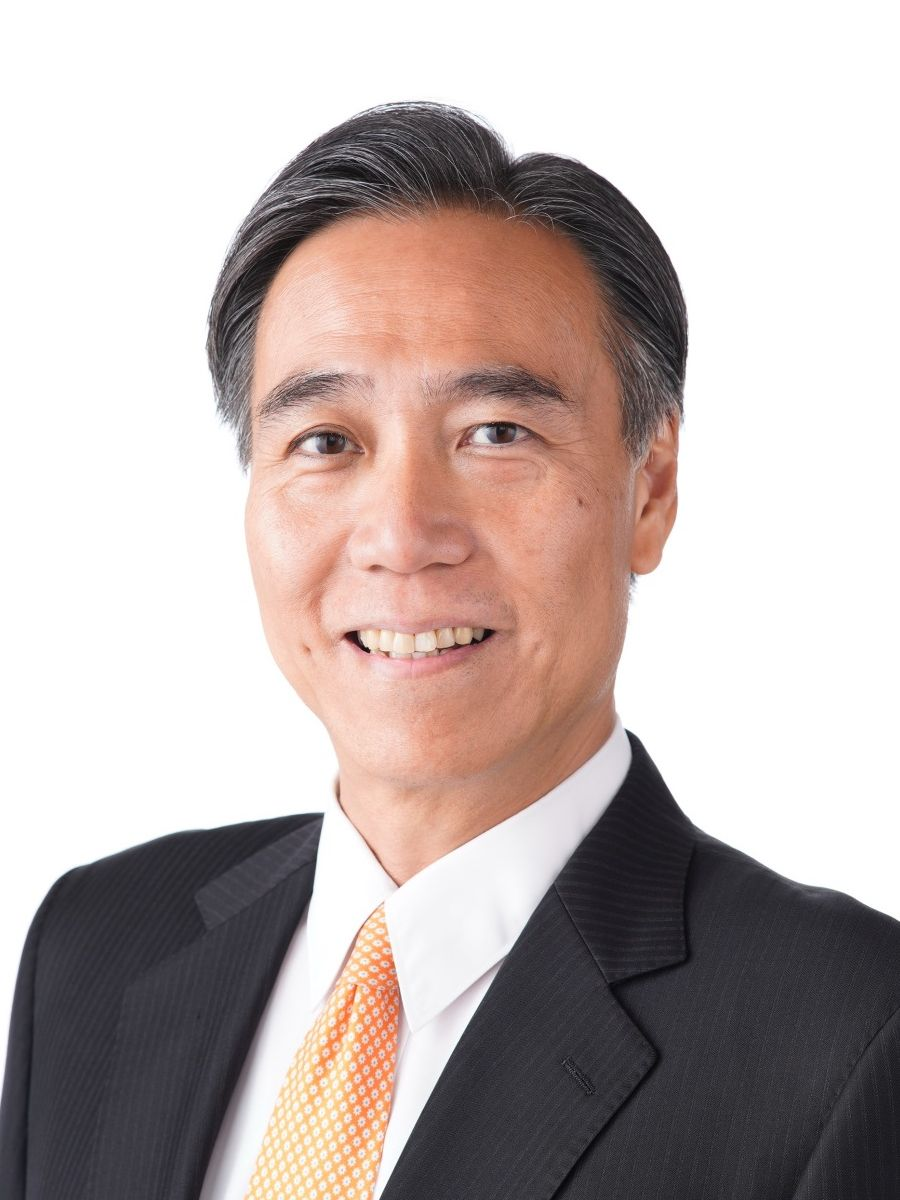
Candidate	Shuichi Abe	Chuichi Kanai
Party	Independent	JCP
Popular vote	615,728	67,758
Percentage	88.84%	9.78%
Governor before election
Shuichi Abe
Independent
Elected Governor
Shuichi Abe
Independent

The 2022 Nagano gubernatorial election was held on 7 August 2022 to elect the next governor of Nagano (長野県, Nagano-ken), a prefecture of Japan located in the Chūbu region of Honshu island. Incumbent Governor Shuichi Abe was re-elected for a fourth term, defeating Chuichi Kanai with 88.84% of the vote.

== Candidates ==
- Shuichi Abe, 61, incumbent since 2010, bureaucrat. Backed by DPFP, LDP, Komeito, CDP and SDP.
- Chuichi Kanai, 72, farmer, former member of the Ueda Municipal Assembly. Candidate of the JCP.
- Shigeo Kusama, 72, former school staff.

== Results ==
2022 Nagano gubernatorial election
Party	Candidate	Votes	%	±%
Democratic Party for the People	Shuichi Abe *	615,728	88.84	▲3.70
JCP	Chuichi Kanai	67,758	9.78	▼5.08
Independent	Shigeo Kusama	9,560	1.38	n/a
Turnout		698,735	40.94	▼2.34
Registered electors		1,706,682		
Democratic Party for the People hold		Swing	79.04	
