= Magra Church =

Church in Alingsås Municipality, Sweden

Coordinates: 58°6′50″N 12°37′13″E

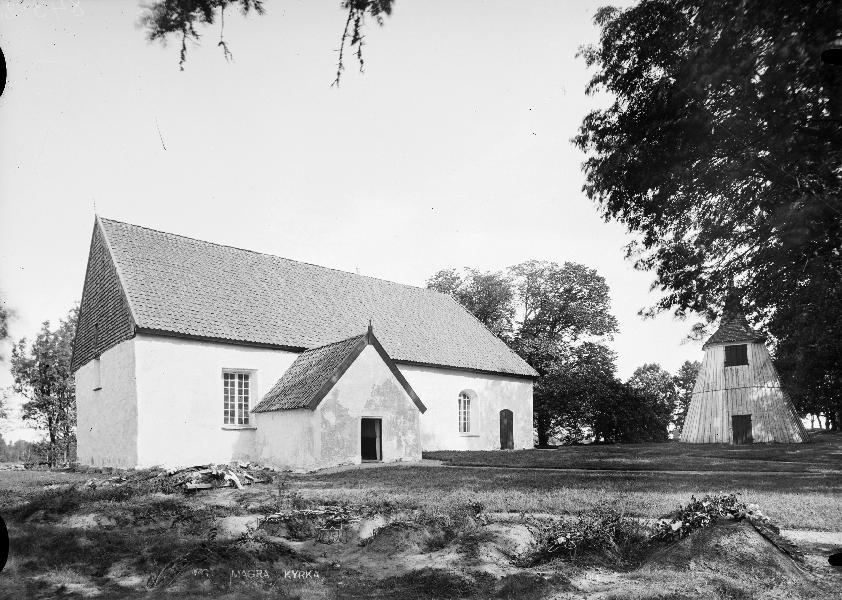
Magra Church

Magra Church (Swedish: Magra kyrka) is a church in Alingsås, Västergötland, Sweden. The small church building itself belongs to the parish of Bjärke, in the Diocese of Skara. The church was built sometime in the Middle Ages, probably in the 12th century. The pulpit was made in 1650, and its figurines were made 1693. In 1963, a large detached section was added in the southeast.
