= 2022 Nevis Island Assembly election =

Nevis Island Assembly elections

- 12 December 2022

5 of the 8 seats in the Nevis Island Assembly
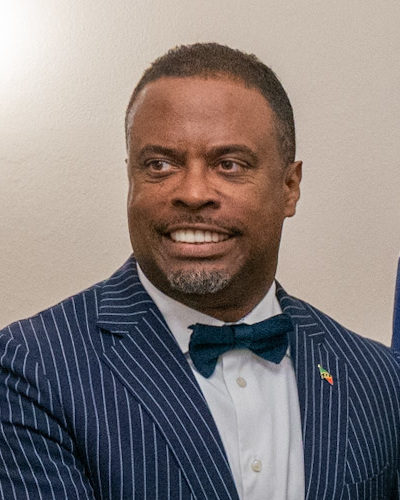
	First party	Second party
		NRP
Leader	Mark Brantley	Janice Daniel-Hodge
Party	CCM	NRP
Last election	56.7%, 4 seats	43.3%, 1 seat
Seats won	3	2
Seat change	▼1	▲1
Popular vote	3,930	3,543
Percentage	52.4%	47.2%
Swing	▼4.3pp	▲3.9pp
- Results by constituency.
Premier before election
Mark Brantley
CCM
Premier after election
Mark Brantley
CCM

Island Assembly elections were held in Nevis on 12 December 2022 to elect five members of the Nevis Island Assembly.

The result was a win for the Concerned Citizens' Movement (CCM), led by Mark Brantley, which won 3 of the 5 seats. The opposition Nevis Reformation Party (NRP) won 2 seats, gaining the parish of St James'.

== Election results ==
Party	Votes	%	Seats
Concerned Citizens' Movement	3,930	52.39	3
Nevis Reformation Party	3,543	47.23	2
Moral Restoration Movement	28	0.37	0
Appointed members			3
Total	7,501	100.00	8
Valid votes	7,501	99.32	
Invalid/blank votes	51	0.68	
Total votes	7,552	100.00	
Registered voters/turnout	13,110	57.60	
Source: St Kitts & Nevis Observer

=== By parish ===
St Paul's
Party	Candidate	Votes	%
CCM	Spencer Brand	631	51.1%
NRP	Jaedee Caines	604	48.9%
Total valid votes		1235	
Informal votes		0	
Rejected ballots		5	
Turnout		1,240	53.98
Registered electors		2,297	

St John's
Party	Candidate	Votes	%
CCM	Mark Brantley	1,313	52.6%
NRP	Patricia Bartlette	1,166	46.7%
MRM	Samuel Caines	17	0.7%
Total valid votes		2,493	
Informal votes		6	
Rejected ballots		19	
Turnout		2,518	56.14
Registered electors		4,485	

St George's
Party	Candidate	Votes	%
CCM	Eric Evelyn	736	70.3%
NRP	Rohan Isles	311	29.7%
Total valid votes		1,048	
Informal votes		0	
Rejected ballots		10	
Turnout		1,058	58.13
Registered electors		1,820	

St James'
Party	Candidate	Votes	%
NRP	Janice Daniel-Hodge	750	49.9%
CCM	Alexis Jeffers	742	49.4%
MRM	Patricia Mills-Jeffers	11	0.7%
Total valid votes		1,503	
Informal votes		5	
Rejected ballots		3	
Turnout		1,510	57.85
Registered electors		2,610	

St Thomas'
Party	Candidate	Votes	%
NRP	Cleone Stapleton-Simmonds	712	58.4%
CCM	Latoya Jones	508	41.6%
Total valid votes		1,220	
Informal votes		2	
Rejected ballots		1	
Turnout		1,223	64.43
Registered electors		1,898	
