= Masao Uchibori =

Japanese politician

- 内堀 雅雄
- Uchibori in 2026

Governor of Fukushima Prefecture
- Incumbent
- Assumed office 12 November 2014
- Monarchs: Akihito; Naruhito
- Preceded by: Yūhei Satō

Personal details
- Born: 26 March 1964 (age 62) Nagano, Nagano, Japan
- Party: Independent
- Education: University of Tokyo (BEc in 1986)

Masao Uchibori (Japanese: 内堀 雅雄, Hepburn: Uchibori Masao; born 26 March 1964) is a Japanese politician and the current governor of Fukushima Prefecture in Japan. He previously served as the vice-governor of his predecessor Yūhei Satō and was elected in October 2014 after Satō chose not to contest the election.
