= 2022 Ascension general election =

General elections were held on Ascension Island on 20 October 2022 to elect the Island Council, following the dissolution of the previous Council on 1 September. Six candidates ran for five available councillor positions. Initially scheduled for 22 September 2022, the elections were postponed as there were not enough validly nominated candidates to fill all the available seats.

== Electoral system ==
The Island Council consists of either five or seven elected members, depending on the number of candidates. If there are eight or more candidates, seven members would be elected; if there were fewer than eight candidates, only five would be elected. With only six candidates running, five seats were available.

The five seats were elected for three years terms by plurality-at-large voting. Voters were able to cast up to five votes.

== Results ==
Candidate	Votes	%	Notes
Laura Marie Shearer	90	24.86	Elected
Kerry Ann Benjamin	73	20.17	Elected
Alan Herbert Nicholls	62	17.13	Re-elected
Kyla Benjamin	55	15.19	Elected
Douglas Gordon Miller	46	12.71	Elected
Kenneth Anthony Godkin	36	9.94	
Total	362	100.00	
Total votes	133	–	
Registered voters/turnout	511	26.03	
Source: Government of Ascension Island
