= 2022 Montana elections =

- November 8, 2022

A general election was held in Montana on November 8, 2022. Both of Montana's seats in the United States House of Representatives, all of the seats in the Montana House of Representatives, and half of the seats in the Montana Senate were up for election, as well as various local offices and ballot measures. The primary election was held on June 7, 2022.

== Federal ==
=== Congress ===
==== House of Representatives ====
Republicans won both of Montana's seats in the United States House of Representatives.

== State ==
=== Executive ===
==== Public Service Commissioner ====
Randy Pinocci ran unopposed for District 1. In District 5 Republican Ann Bukacek defeated Democrat John Repke.

=== Legislature ===
==== Senate ====
25 of the 50 seats in the Montana Senate were up for election in 2022.

==== House of Representatives ====
All 100 seats in the Montana House of Representatives were up for election in 2022.

=== Judicial ===
==== Supreme Court Justice #1 ====
Incumbent Jim Rice defeated Bill D'Alton. Rice is the longest serving member of the Montana Supreme Court having been appointed in 2001 by Judy Martz.

==== Supreme Court Justice #2 ====
Incumbent Ingrid Gustafson defeated James Brown. While the candidates are non-partisan, this race became overtly partisan. Brown received significant Republican support, including endorsement by Governor Gianforte, prior to the primaries. Both candidates received significant campaign contributions from outside groups. Montana Free Press reported $3 million spent by outside groups, making it the most money ever spent in a Montana Supreme Court race.

== Ballot measures ==
=== Amendment 48 ===
Amendment 48
- November 8, 2022
- An act submitting to the qualified electors of Montana an amendment to Article II, section 11, of the Montana Constitution to explicitly include electronic data and communications in search and seizure protections.

Results
Choice	Votes	%
Yes	365,091	82.33%
No	78,334	17.67%
Total votes	443,425	100.00%
- County results Yes 80–90% 70–80%

Amendment 48 is a legislatively-referred proposed constitutional amendment. It would amend the Constitution of Montana to require a search warrant to access electronic data. The amendment passed in a landslide.

==== Contents ====
The amendment appeared the ballot as follows:

An act submitting to the qualified electors of Montana an amendment to Article II, section 11, of the Montana Constitution to explicitly include electronic data and communications in search and seizure protections.

==== Results ====
Amendment 48
Choice	Votes	%
For	365,091	82.33
Against	78,334	17.67
Total	443,425	100.00
Source: https://electionresults.mt.gov/resultsSW.aspx?type=BQ&map=CTY

=== Referendum 131 ===
Referendum 131 is a legislatively-referred proposed state stature. It would enact a law to require medical care be provided to an infant born alive, including after an abortion. The law would be similar to the existing federal Born-Alive Infants Protection Act. The referendum failed.

==== Contents ====
The referendum appeared the ballot as follows:

An act adopting the born-alive infant protection act; providing that infants born alive, including infants born alive after an abortion, are legal persons; requiring health care providers to take necessary actions to preserve the life of a born-alive infant; providing a penalty; providing that the proposed act be submitted to the qualified electors of Montana; and providing an effective date.

==== Results ====
Referendum 131
Choice	Votes	%
For	213,001	47.45
Against	235,904	52.55
Total	448,905	100.00
Source: Montana Secretary of State
