= 2022 Missouri elections =

- November 8, 2022

Missouri state elections were held on November 8, 2022, and the primary election were held on August 2, 2022.

Missouri voters elected their Class 3 US Senator, State Auditor, all of the seats for the House of Representatives, all of the seats of the Missouri House of Representatives, and 17 of 34 seats in the Missouri State Senate. The two statewide officer holders, Roy Blunt and Nicole Galloway, did not run for re-election leaving both statewide seats with no incumbents. Two of the seats for the House of Representatives were open as incumbent Vicky Hartzler and Billy Long both ran unsuccessfully for the open Senate seat.

== Federal offices ==
=== United States House of Representatives ===
All eight U.S. representatives in Missouri who were up for election.

== State legislature ==
All 163 seats of the Missouri House of Representatives and 17 of 34 seats of the Missouri State Senate were up for election. Before the election, the composition of the Missouri State Legislature was:

=== State senate ===
Party	# of seats
Republican	24
Democratic	10
Total	34

=== House of Representatives ===
Party	# of seats
Republican	108
Democratic	49
Total	163 (Note: Including 6 vacancies.)

After the election, the composition of the Missouri State Legislature was:

=== State senate ===
Party	# of seats
Republican	24
Democratic	10
Total	34

=== House of Representatives ===
Party	# of seats
Republican	111
Democratic	52
Total	163

=== Polling ===
Senate District 2
Republican primary

Poll source	Date(s) administered	Sample size (Note: Key: A – all adults RV – registered voters LV – likely voters V – unclear)	Margin of error	Nick Schroer	John Wiemann	Undecided
Remington Research (R)/Missouri Scout (Note: Non-partisan poll conducted for the local non-partisan tipsheet Missouri Scout)	July 19–21, 2022	344 (LV)	± 5.1%	36%	25%	39%
Public Opinion Strategies (R) (Note: This poll was sponsored by an unknown client)	June 26–29, 2022	250 (LV)	± 6.2%	36%	18%	46%
Remington Research (R)/Missouri Scout	May 18–19, 2022	346 (LV)	± 5.3%	22%	9%	69%

Senate District 10
Republican primary

Poll source	Date(s) administered	Sample size	Margin of error	Mike Carter	Travis Fitzwater	Randy Pietzman	Jeff Porter	Joshua Price	Bryan Spencer	Undecided
Remington Research (R)/Missouri Scout	July 22–25, 2022	314 (LV)	± 5.5%	28%	18%	–	10%	8%	10%	25%
	June 7, 2022	Pietzman withdraws from the race								
Remington Research (R)/Missouri Scout	April 9–11, 2022	301 (LV)	± 5.3%	10%	17%	15%	8%	3%	7%	40%

Senate District 12
Republican primary

Poll source	Date(s) administered	Sample size	Margin of error	Rusty Black	J. Eggleston	Delus Johnson	Undecided
Remington Research (R)/Missouri Scout	July 22–24, 2022	377 (LV)	± 5.1%	43%	24%	8%	25%
Remington Research (R) (Note: This poll was sponsored by Great Northwest PAC, which supports Black)	June 30 – July 5, 2022	452 (LV)	± 4.5%	38%	14%	6%	42%

Senate District 16
Republican primary

Poll source	Date(s) administered	Sample size	Margin of error	Justin Brown	Suzie Pollock	Undecided
Remington Research (R)/Missouri Scout	June 8–9, 2022	326 (LV)	± 5.3%	40%	23%	37%

Senate District 20
Republican primary

Poll source	Date(s) administered	Sample size	Margin of error	Brian Gelner	Curtis Trent	Undecided
Remington Research (R)/Missouri Scout	July 23–26, 2022	303 (LV)	± 5.5%	29%	42%	29%
Remington Research (R)/Missouri Scout	May 31 – June 2, 2022	322 (LV)	± 5.3%	6%	17%	77%

Senate District 22
Republican primary

Poll source	Date(s) administered	Sample size	Margin of error	Mary Elizabeth Coleman	Shane Roden	Jeff Roorda	Dan Shaul	Undecided
Remington Research (R)/Missouri Scout	July 25–28, 2022	303 (LV)	± 5.5%	23%	14%	22%	16%	25%
Remington Research (R)/Missouri Scout	March 30 – April 1, 2022	326 (LV)	± 5.3%	15%	10%	16%	12%	47%

Senate District 24
General election

Poll source	Date(s) administered	Sample size	Margin of error	George Hruza (R)	Tracy McCreery (D)	Undecided
Show Me Victories (D) (Note: This poll was sponsored by McCreery's campaign)	May 21–22, 2022	638 (RV)	± 3.5%	35%	49%	16%

Senate District 26
Republican primary

Poll source	Date(s) administered	Sample size	Margin of error	Ben Brown	Jason Franklin	Bob Jones	Merry-Noella Skaggs	Nate Tate	Undecided
Remington Research (R)/Missouri Scout	July 24–27, 2022	309 (LV)	± 5.5%	18%	1%	22%	4%	23%	32%
Remington Research (R)/Missouri Scout	April 9–11, 2022	297 (LV)	± 5.3%	4%	1%	5%	5%	20%	65%

== Ballot measures ==
There was four amendments as well as a question to rewrite the state constitution on the ballot in November. Amendment 1 changes how the State Treasurer of Missouri is allowed to invest taxpayer money. Amendment 3 legalizes cannabis and allows expungement of convictions while also allowing judges to deny the expungement for "good cause". Amendment 4 makes an exception to the Hancock Amendment to allow the increase of required spending for the Kansas City Police put in place by SB 678. Amendment 5 makes the Missouri National Guard its own department and renames it to Missouri Department of the National Guard.

Amendment 1 results by county No: 70–80%; 60–70%; 50–60%; Yes: 50–60%

Amendment 3 results by county Yes: 70–80%; 60–70%; 50–60%; No: 70–80%; 60–70%; 50–60%

Amendment 4 results by county Yes: 70–80%; 60–70%; 50–60%; No: 50–60%

Amendment 5 results by county Yes: 70–80%; 60–70%; 50–60%; No: 50–60%

Constitutional Convention Question results by county No: 70–80%; 60–70%

== Notes ==
Partisan clients
