= Michel Magras =

French politician (born 1954)

Michel Magras (born 6 January 1954) is a former member of the Senate of France who represented the island of Saint Barthélemy from 2008 to 2020. He is a member of the Union for a Popular Movement. His brother Bruno Magras is the current President of the Territorial Council of Saint Barthélemy and owns the St Barth Commuter local airline.
