= 2012 Saint Barthélemy Territorial Council election =

Territorial Council elections were held in the French overseas collectivity of Saint Barthélemy on 18 March 2012.

== Electoral system ==
The elections were held using a modified proportional two-round system with a majority bonus in one constituency. If a list received an absolute majority of the vote cast in the first round, no second round would be held. Otherwise, only lists that had obtained more than 10% of the vote could contest the second round. According to the electoral code, the list that finished first in the second round (or the first round, if no second round was held) and obtained a number of votes equal to at least one-third of registered voters would be given a seat bonus of one-third of the total seats (seven), while the other seats were allocated by proportional representation, under the highest averages method. If multiple lists tied for first place, the bonus would be given to the list with the highest average candidate age.

Councilors serve a five-year term, unless elected in a by-election, in which case they go up for re-election at the same time as other seats.

== Results ==
Party	Votes	%	Seats	+/–
Saint Barth First!–UMP	2,626	73.78	16	0
All for Saint-Barth	567	15.93	2	New
Saint Barth in Motion	366	10.28	1	New
Total	3,559	100.00	19	0
Valid votes	3,559	97.40		
Invalid/blank votes	95	2.60		
Total votes	3,654	100.00		
Registered voters/turnout	5,111	71.49		
Source: MemoireStBarth
