= Elections in Saint Pierre and Miquelon =

Elections are held in Saint-Pierre and Miquelon for the French president, a member of the National Assembly, a member of the Senate, and a territorial legislature.

== Presidential elections ==
Electors from Saint-Pierre and Miquelon vote in all French presidential elections.

== Member of the National Assembly ==
Elections are held at the same time as in France. The current deputy is Annick Girardin, affiliated with the Left Radical Party in the National Assembly. She was first elected in 2007.

== Member of the Senate ==
Senators are only elected by a small college of electors, delegates of the General Council of Saint-Pierre and Miquelon and delegates of the two Municipal Councils. The current Senator is Karine Claireaux, who until 2020 also was the Mayor of St Pierre.

== Territorial Council ==
Saint-Pierre and Miquelon elects on territorial level a legislature. The Territorial Council (Conseil Territorial) has 19 members, elected for a six-year term in single-seat constituencies. Saint-Pierre and Miquelon has a multi-party system, with numerous parties.

Elections are held in two stages. The first stage (Premier tour) is open to all candidates and the majority of seats can only be given out if a political group achieves true majority at the ballot box. If no majority is attained on this ballot, a second ballot is held the following Sunday. On the second ballot (Second tour), only a relative majority is necessary to obtain 11 out of the 19 seats. The rest of the seats (save 4 for Miquelon) are distributed through a system of proportional representation.

== Municipal elections ==
Both municipalities have elected councils.

== See also ==
- Electoral calendar
- Electoral system
