= 2022 Shiga gubernatorial election =

- 10 July 2022
- Turnout: 55.28 ▲14.66
Candidate	Taizo Mikazuki	Kiyotsugu Konishi
Party	Independent	JCP
Popular vote	530,460	80,301
Percentage	86.85%	13.85%
Governor before election
Taizo Mikazuki
DPFP
Elected Governor
Taizo Mikazuki
DPFP

The 2022 Shiga gubernatorial election was held on 10 July 2022 to elect the next governor of Shiga (滋賀県, Shiga-ken), a prefecture of Japan located in the Kansai region of Honshu island.

== Candidates ==
- Taizo Mikazuki, incumbent since 2014, 51, ex-lawmaker of the DPJ, endorsed by DPFP, CDP, LDP, Komeito and SDP.
- Kiyotsugu Konishi, endorsed by JCP.

== Results ==
Shiga gubernatorial election, 2022
Party	Candidate	Votes	%	±%
Democratic Party for the People	Taizo Mikazuki *	530,460	86.85	▲3.84
JCP	Kiyotsugu Konishi	80,301	13.85	▼3,84
Turnout		628.996	55,28	▲14.66
Registered electors		1,137,832		
Democratic Party for the People hold		Swing	73.70	
