= 2022 Cuban local elections =

The 2022 Cuban local elections were held on 27 November 2022. They were boycotted by the opposition.
