= 2022 Nicaraguan local elections =

Local elections in Nicaragua were held on 6 November 2022. 153 mayors, vice mayors and municipal council members were elected. The Sandinista National Liberation Front won control of all municipalities.

== Results ==
Party	Votes	%
United Alliance Nicaragua Triumphs (FSLN)	1,494,688	73.70
Constitutionalist Liberal Party	256,429	12.64
Nicaraguan Liberal Alliance	93,203	4.60
Independent Liberal Party	84,345	4.16
Alliance for the Republic	79,993	3.94
YATAMA	19,367	0.95
Total	2,028,025	100.00
Valid votes	2,028,025	96.21
Invalid/blank votes	79,968	3.79
Total votes	2,107,993	100.00
Registered voters/turnout	3,692,733	57.08
Source: AFGJ

== See also ==
- Politics of Nicaragua
