= Société d'histoire de la Guadeloupe =

- Nickname: SHG
- Formation: 1963
- Headquarters: Guadeloupe
- Official language: French
- Main organ: Bulletin de la Société d'Histoire de la Guadeloupe

The Societe d'Histoire de la Guadeloupe (Guadeloupe Historical Society) is a French society for the study of the history of Guadeloupe, the French Antilles and the wider Caribbean basin. It was founded in 1963 and publishes a scholarly journal titled Bulletin de la Société d'Histoire de la Guadeloupe.
