= Saint Barth First! =

Saint Barth First! Saint-Barth d’abord!
- Leader: Bruno Magras
- Ideology: Francophilia; Liberal conservatism
- Political position: Centre-right to right-wing
- National affiliation: Les Republicains
- Territorial Council: 6 / 19

Saint Barth First! (French: Saint-Barth d’abord!) is a political party in Saint Barthélemy, led by Bruno Magras. It won in the 18 March 2012 Territorial Council elections 16 out of 19 seats. The party is affiliated with the French Les Republicains.
