= 2022 Syrian local elections =

Syrian local elections, 2022
- 18 September 2022

18,478 seats in 88 electoral districts

The 2022 Syrian local elections were held on 18 September 2022. Positions in all 14 governorates, 158 cities, 572 towns and 726 municipalities were up for election. They were the last local elections to be held in Ba'athist Syria, prior to its overthrow following the 2024 Syrian opposition offensives.
