= University of the French Antilles =

Public university in the West Indies

Coordinates: 4.9400°N 52.3220°W

University of the Antilles
- Université des Antilles
- Type: Public
- Established: 1982
- Chancellor: Michel H. Geoffroy
- Location: France
- Website: www.univ-antilles.fr

University of the French Antilles (French: Université des Antilles), also known in English as the University of the Antilles, is a French public university, located in the French West Indies.

== History ==
It was previously part of a larger institution in combination with campuses in French Guiana known as the University of the French West Indies and Guiana. As a result of funding disputes, that university was separated into two distinct institutions based on its constituent parts in French Guiana and the Lesser Antilles respectively. The separation process was completed by 1 January 2015.

== Location ==
The university has three campuses:

- two in Guadeloupe: Fouillole (Pointe-à-Pitre) and Saint-Claude,
- one in Martinique: Schœlcher (while there is also the campus of the IUFM in Fort-de-France and the medical campus (CHRU, a regional university hospital) of La Meynard in Le Lamentin).

== Notable people ==
=== Faculty ===
- Jacques Adélaïde-Merlande (born 1933) - historian
- Carlos Moore (born 1942) - writer, social researcher, professor and activist
- Pierre A. Riffard - philosopher and specialist in esotericism
- Georges Voisset (born 1948) - literary critic
- Suzanne Dracius (born 1951) - writer and literary critic
- Pierre Cahuc (born 1962) - economist

=== Alumni ===
- Juliana Rimane (born 1959) - politician
- Annick Petrus (born 1961) - politician
- Sabine Andrivon-Milton (born 1970) - historian
- Micheline Jacques (born 1971) - politician
- Tina Nadine Anilus - women's rights activist

== See also ==
- List of public universities in France by academy
- University of French Guiana
