= Bruno Magras =

French politician

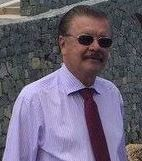

President of the Territorial Council of Saint-Barthélemy
- In office 15 July 2007 – 3 April 2022
- Preceded by: position established
- Succeeded by: Xavier Ledée

Personal details
- Born: 9 September 1951 (age 75) Saint-Barthélémy

Bruno Magras (born 9 September 1951) is a French politician. A member of the Union for a Popular Movement since 1995, he was elected President of the Territorial Council of Saint Barthélemy on 15 July 2007, winning with 72% of the vote. He was reelected on 19 November 2010 for another three years. He is ex officio member of the National Council of UMP. He is the founder and CEO of St Barth Commuter.
