= Territorial Council of Saint Barthélemy =

Legislature

Territorial Council of Saint Barthélemy Collectivité territoriale de Saint-Barthélemy

Type
- Type: Unicameral

History
- Founded: 2007

Structure
- Seats: 19 members
- Political groups: Union-équilibre (13); Saint Barth First! (LR) (6)
- Length of term: 5 years

Elections
- Last election: 2022
- Next election: 2027

Meeting place
- Gustavia

The Territorial Council of Saint Barthélemy (French: Conseil territorial de Saint-Barthélemy) is the consultative assembly for the French overseas collectivity of Saint Barthélemy. Elections are held on a five-year cycle for all 19 members using a form of majority bonus system. The Territorial Council indirectly elects an Executive Council and President and also forms most of the electorate for the election of the collectivity's senator.

== History ==
Following a 2003 referendum Saint Barthélemy was changed from a commune of the French overseas departments and region of Guadeloupe to an into an overseas collectivity of France in 2007. The law was signed by French president Jacques Chirac on 21 February and published on 22 February but the collectivity was not formally established until the Territorial Council first met on 15 July.

The Territorial Council is responsible for local government; representation at the national level is by one member indirectly elected to the Senate, one deputy elected to the National Assembly (shared with the Collectivity of Saint Martin) and one councillor who sits on the French Economic, Social and Environmental Council. The French state is represented in Saint Barthélemy by an appointed prefect.

== Territorial Council elections ==
The Territorial Council contains 19 members who serve 5-year terms of office, with all terms ending simultaneously. Elections use a form of majority bonus system based on party lists of 22 candidates. If a party list obtains an absolute majority in the first round of votes and votes from more than 25% of registered voters it receives one third of the seats on the council; the remaining seats are distributed proportionally to the votes cast using the highest averages method. Candidates receive their seats in the order that they appear on the list and the lists must alternate between male and female candidates.

If no party list obtains an absolute majority a second round of voting is held using the same system except that the initial allocation of one third of the seats goes to the party that wins the most votes, with no requirement for an absolute majority. Only parties that won at least 10% of the first found vote participate in the second round (except that at least two parties must participate). Ties are determined by the seat being allocated to the oldest of the tied candidates (in the event of a tie for the bonus seats they go to the list with the highest average age of candidates).

The Territorial Council elects a president and a 6-person Executive Council from among its members. When a senator's term expires the Territorial Council, current senator and deputy elect a new senator by a two-round vote.

The first elections to the Territorial Council were held in 2007 and saw the Saint Barth First!-Union for a Popular Movement grouping win 16 seats. Bruno Magras was elected president by the Council. Magras' grouping won the 2012 and 2017 elections but the 2022 election saw a combined list from Hélène Bernier's Saint-Barth Action-Équilibre and Xavier Lédée's Unis pour Saint-Barthélémy win and Lédée elected president.

== See also ==
- Territorial Council of Saint Martin
- Territorial Council of Saint Pierre and Miquelon
